= Architecture of Taiwan =

The architecture of Taiwan can be traced back to stilt housing of the aborigines in prehistoric times; to the building of fortresses and churches in the north and south used to colonize and convert the inhabitants during the Dutch and Spanish period; the Tungning period when Taiwan was a base of anti-Qing sentiment and Minnan-style architecture was introduced; in Qing dynasty period, a mix of Chinese and Western architecture appeared and artillery battery flourished during Qing's Self-Strengthening Movement; During the Japanese rule of Taiwan, the Minnan, Japanese and Western culture were main influencers in architectural designs and saw the introduction and use of reinforced concrete. Due to excessive Westernization as a colony, after the retrocession of Taiwan to the Republic of China in 1945 from Japan at the end of World War II, Chinese classical style became popular and entered into international mainstream as a postmodern design style. Today, Taiwanese architecture has undergone much diversification, every style of architecture can be seen.

== Prehistory (−1621) ==
The architecture of prehistoric Taiwan saw structures ranging from cave dwellings, stilt housing, to stone masonry. Primarily of Austronesian architecture.

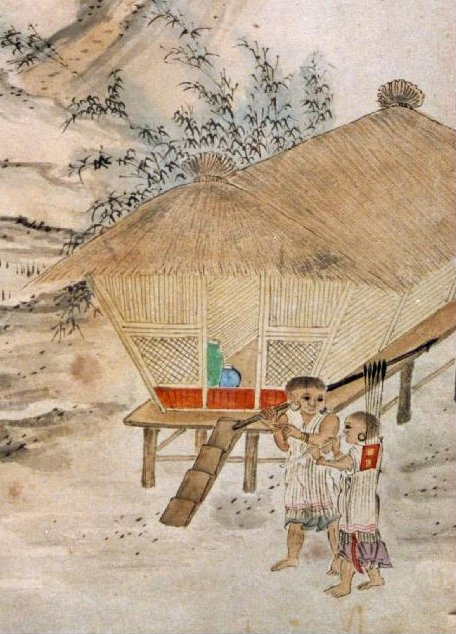
An observational painting of a stilt house of one of the plains indigenous peoples as depicted in Liu Shi Qi’s Taiwan Panorama Prints (六十七兩采風圖合卷).

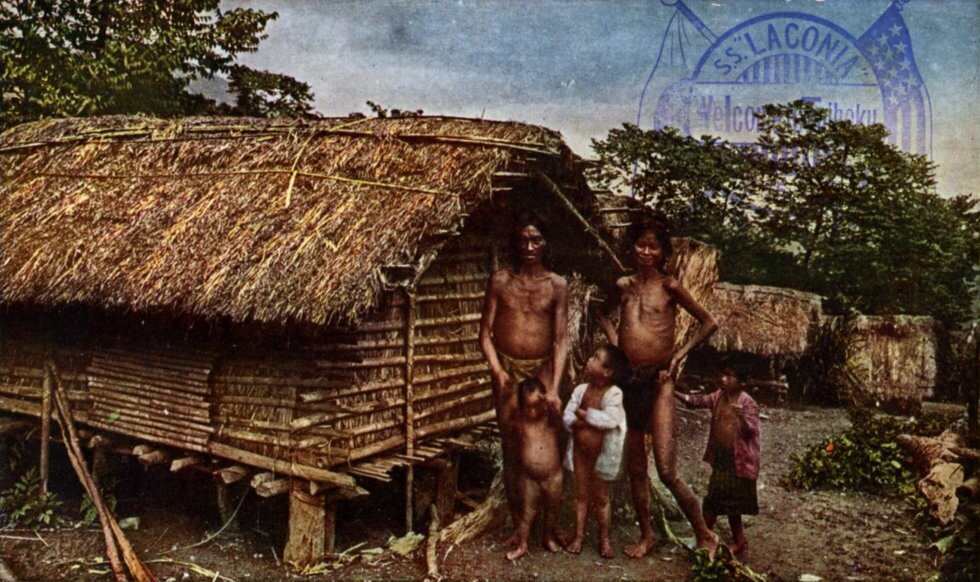
A stilt house of the Truku people

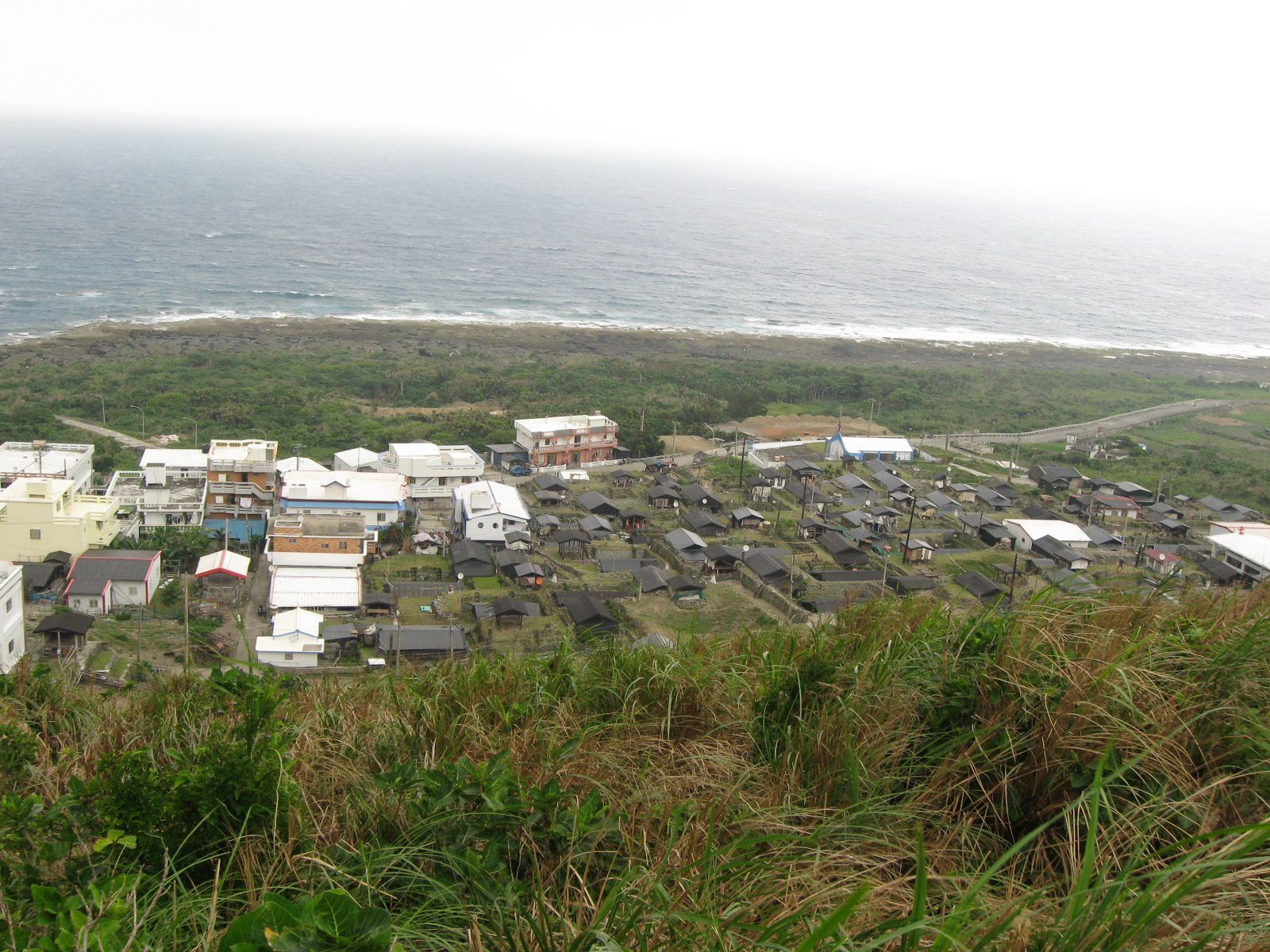
Modern and traditional houses coexisting in present-day Tao settlement on Orchid Island

=== Cave dwelling ===
Prehistoric people made use of caves for their dwellings, and Taiwan's oldest known civilization is the Changbin culture (長濱文化) dating back to over 50,000 years. An example of an archaeological site of a cave dwelling is the Bashian Caves in Changbin Township, Taitung County which is dated from between 5,500 and 30,000 years. The actual cave itself has a height of around ten meters and can accommodate some ten persons.

=== Stilt housing ===
Spread over the vast prehistoric Pacific Ocean and Indian Ocean areas, stilt houses vary greatly. In more recent times, Taiwanese aborigines make use of them for holding church meetings, as places to cool down and to hold ancestral activities. Apart from their cooling effect, stilt houses also have various functions such as avoiding miasma, dampness, flood, and insects and snakes from entering, it is also easier to construct.

=== Stone-slab housing ===
The Paiwan and Bunun peoples made houses using thatched roofing and made walls from stones. Homes of nobles were decorated with elaborate wood carvings. The special characteristics of such houses is that dark colored building materials help conceal the buildings in its environment and the layered use of rocks mimic the scales of the hundred pacer snake that they worship.

=== Aboriginal architecture ===
Chinese and aborigines made use of natural materials such as straw, wood, bamboo, grass, stone, and soil as basic construction materials. The types and styles of building vary depending on the environment, climate, and cultural influences of each ethnic group. For example, the Amis tend to live in larger communities and planned the layout of their community such as placement of communal homes and a plaza for matters of governance inside, planting a bamboo forest around the outside with camps and guard stations to defend against foreign aggressors. The Atayal and Saisiyat peoples made their homes out of wood and bamboo, while the Tao people who lived further away on Orchid Island and faced strong changes in seasonal weather such as typhoons, developed houses that made use of digging vertically into the ground to strengthen their foundations.

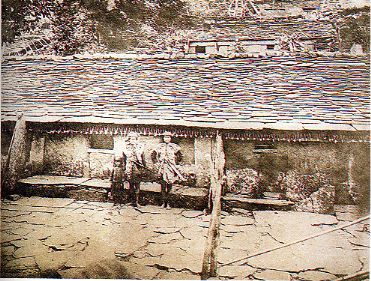
Stone-slab house of the Paiwan people in Tjalja'avus Tribe (來義部落) taken by Japanese anthropologist Ushinosuke Mori prior to 1945

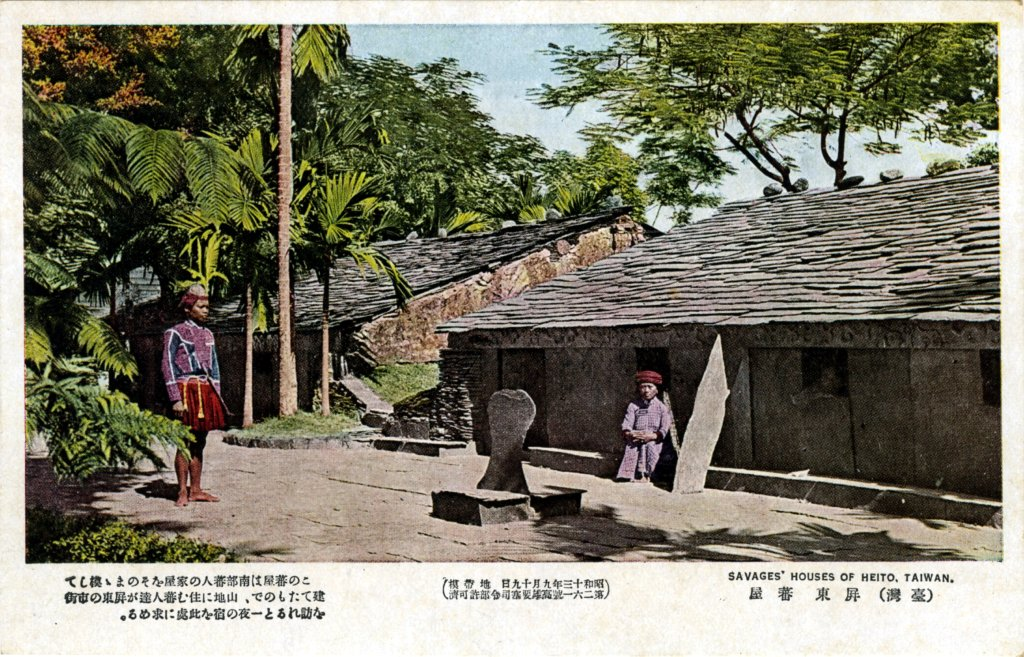
Stone-slab houses in Pingtung Park

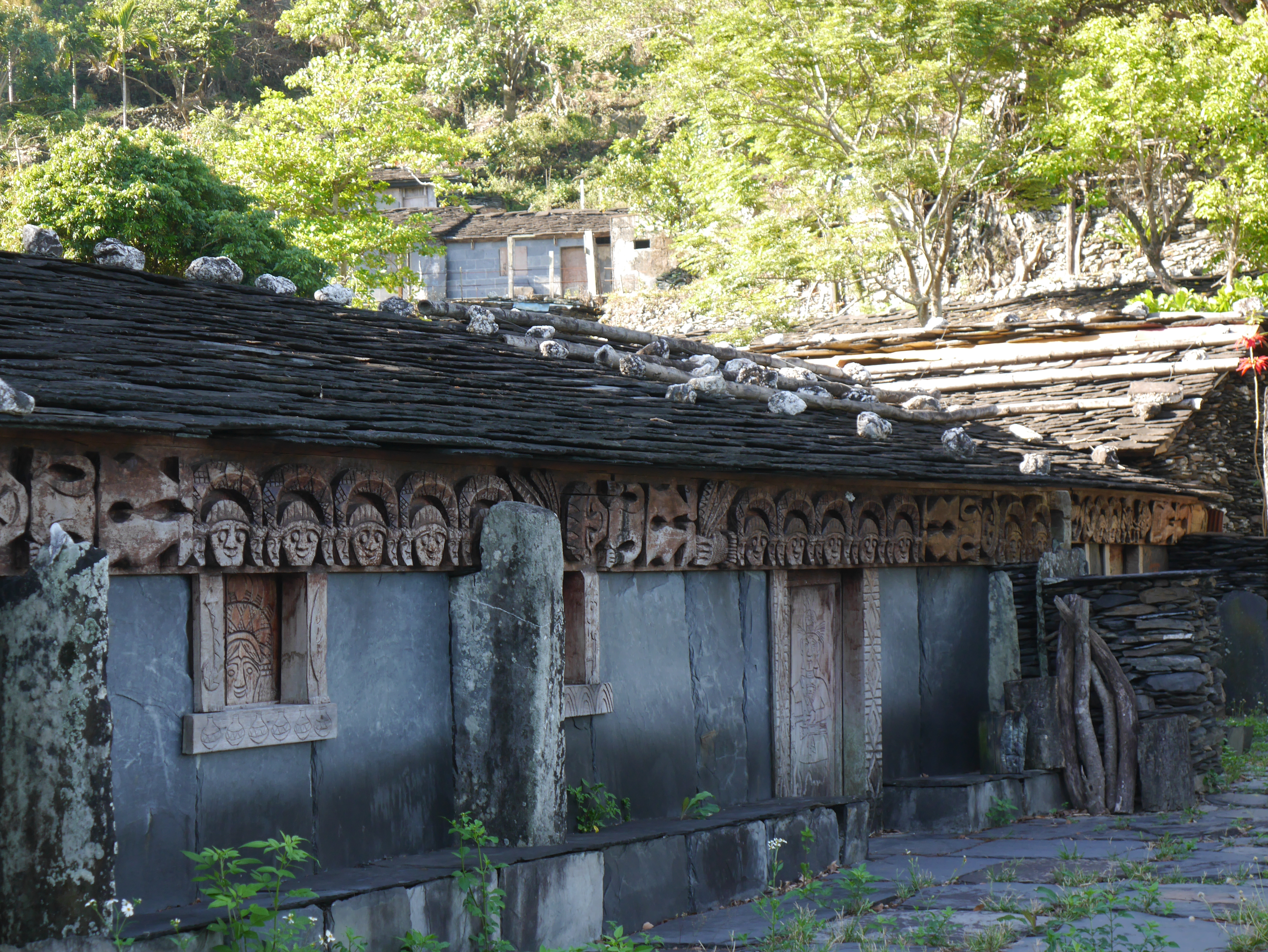
Stone-slab housing of the Paiwan people in Tjuvecekadan Tribe (老七佳部落)

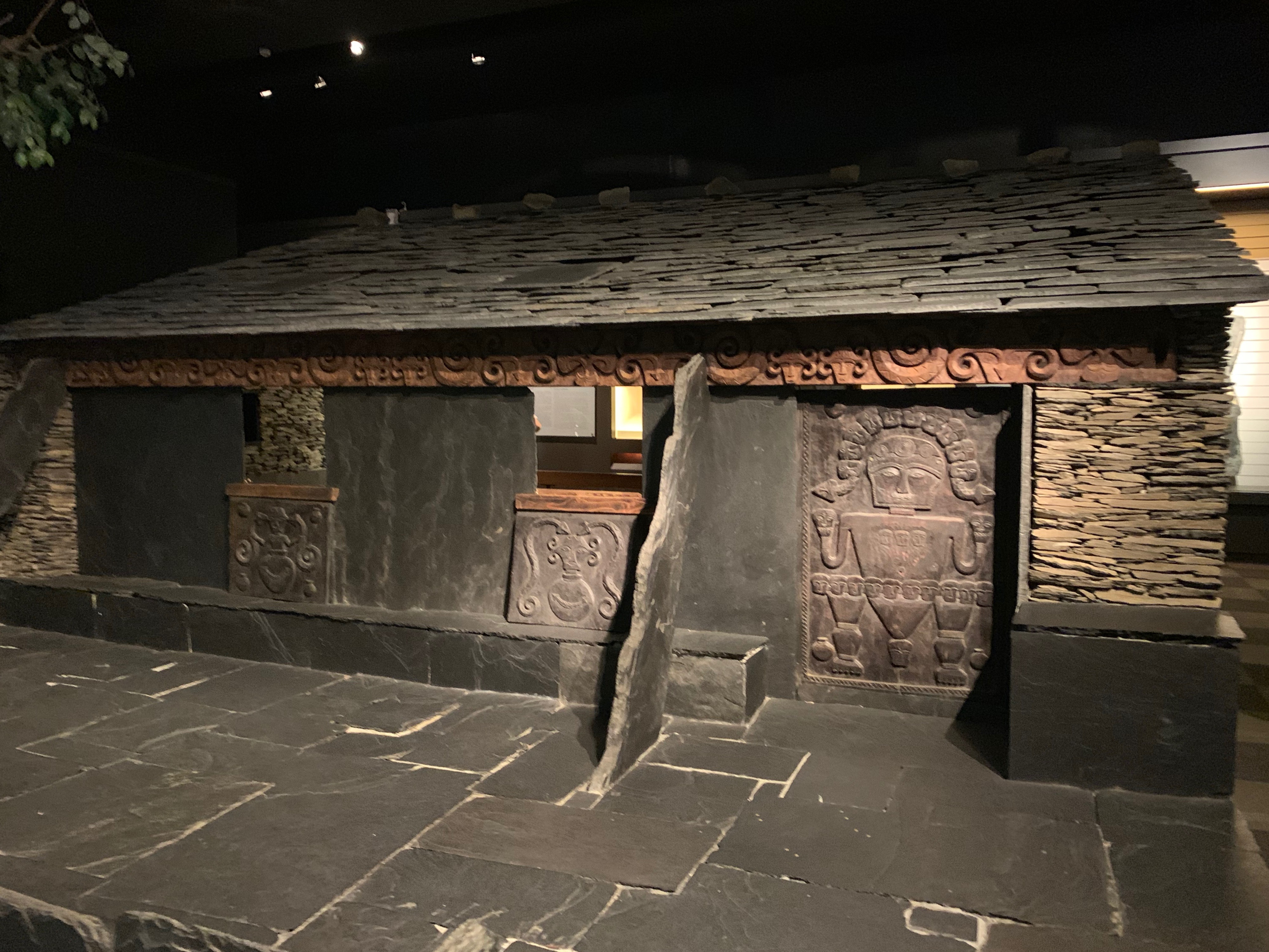
An imitation slate house of the Paiwan people at the National Museum of Natural Science

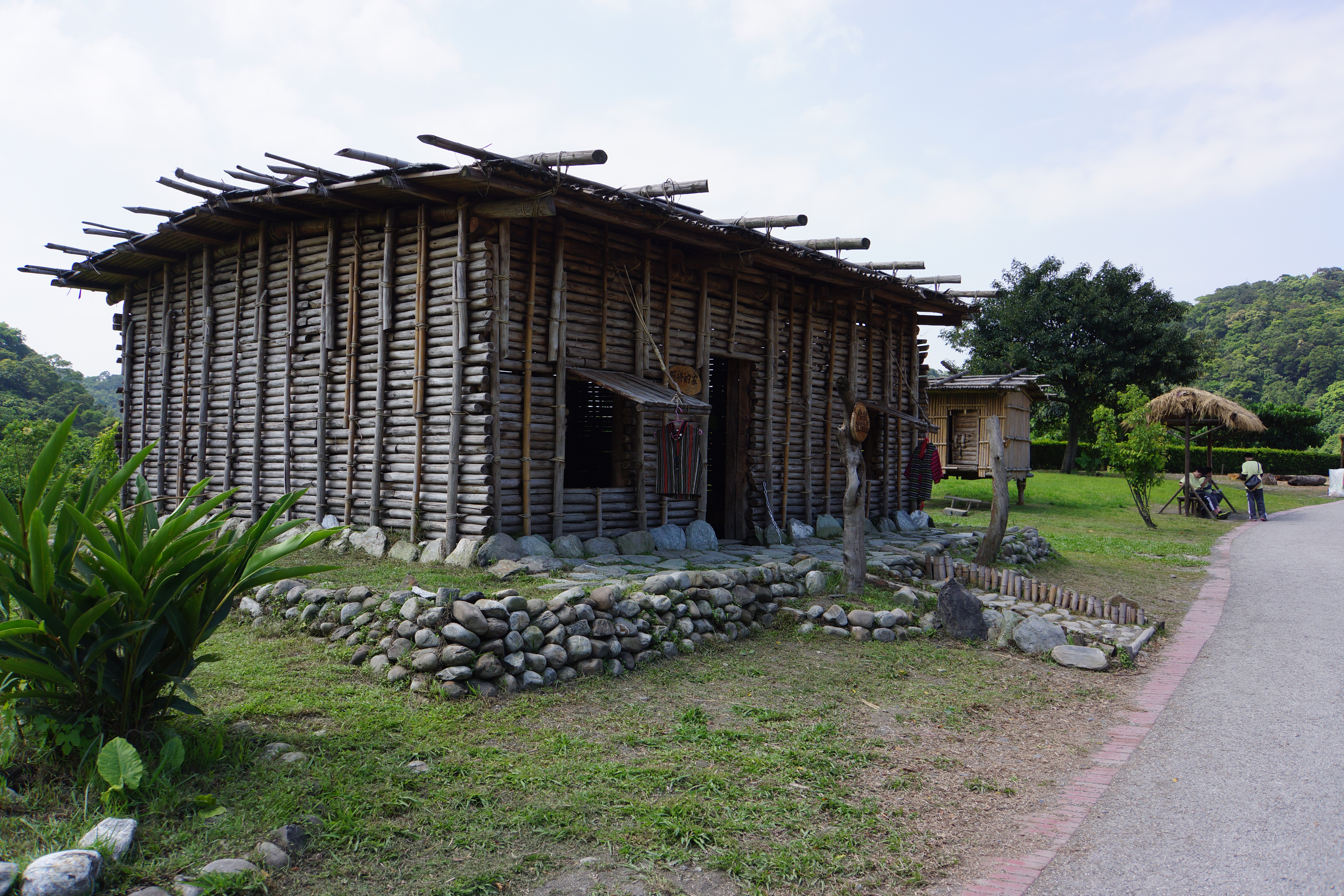
Traditional house of the Atayal people

Inside an imitation of a traditional house of the Atayal people

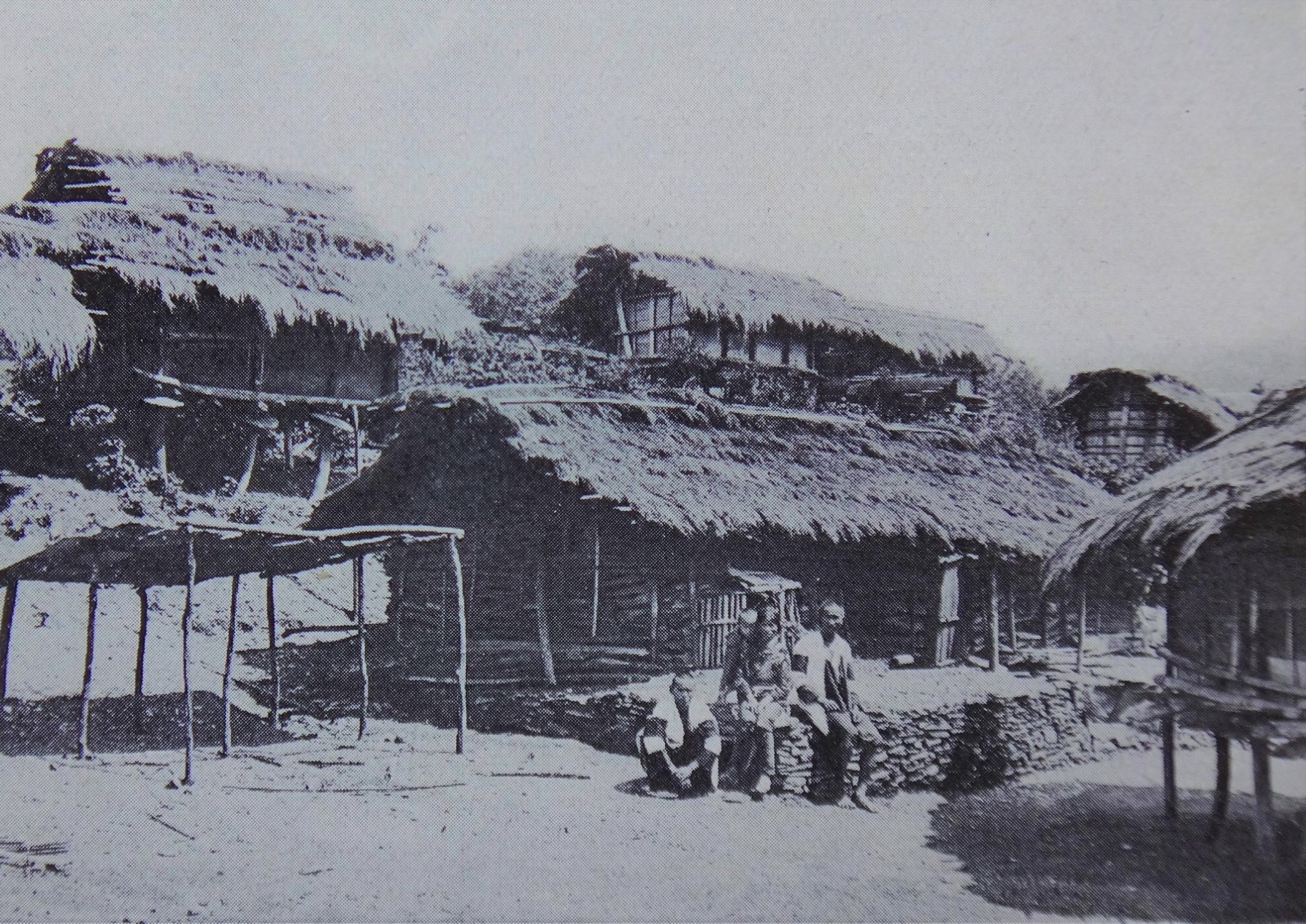
Houses of the Seediq people in Paran Tribe (巴蘭部落)

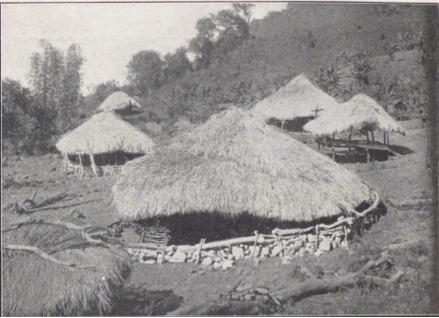
Houses of the Bunun people

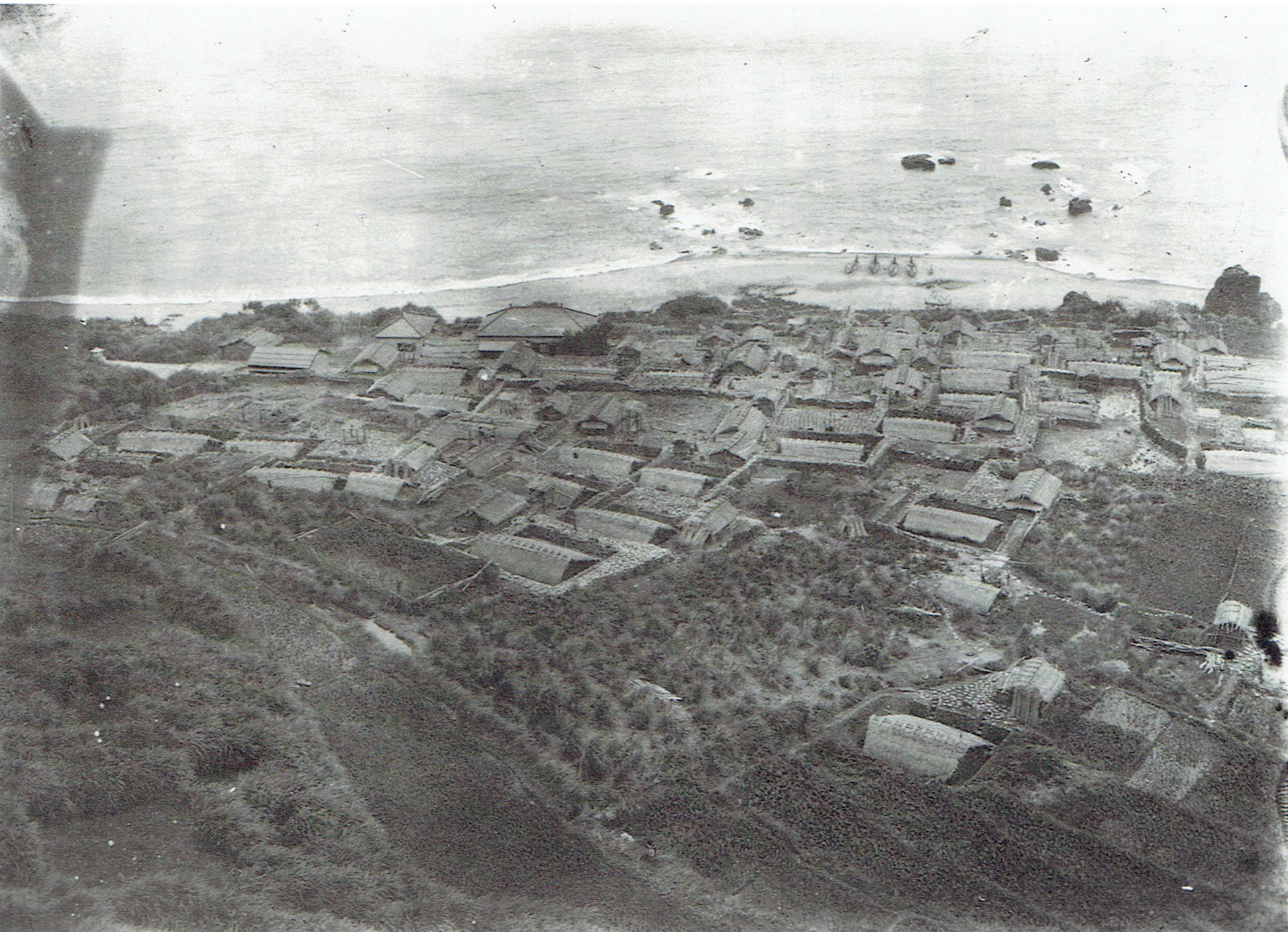
View of a Tao tribe

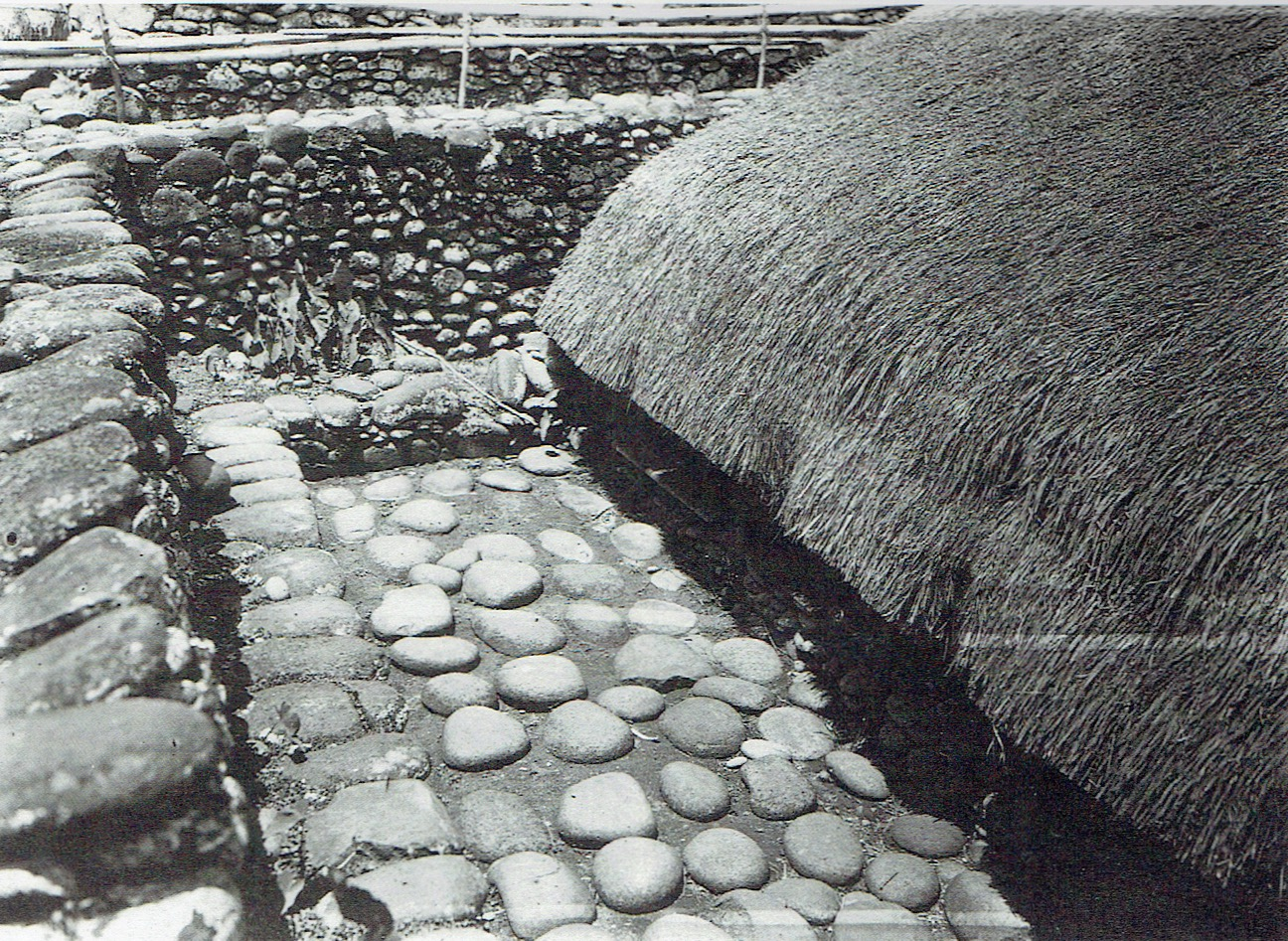
A house and its surroundings in a Tao tribe

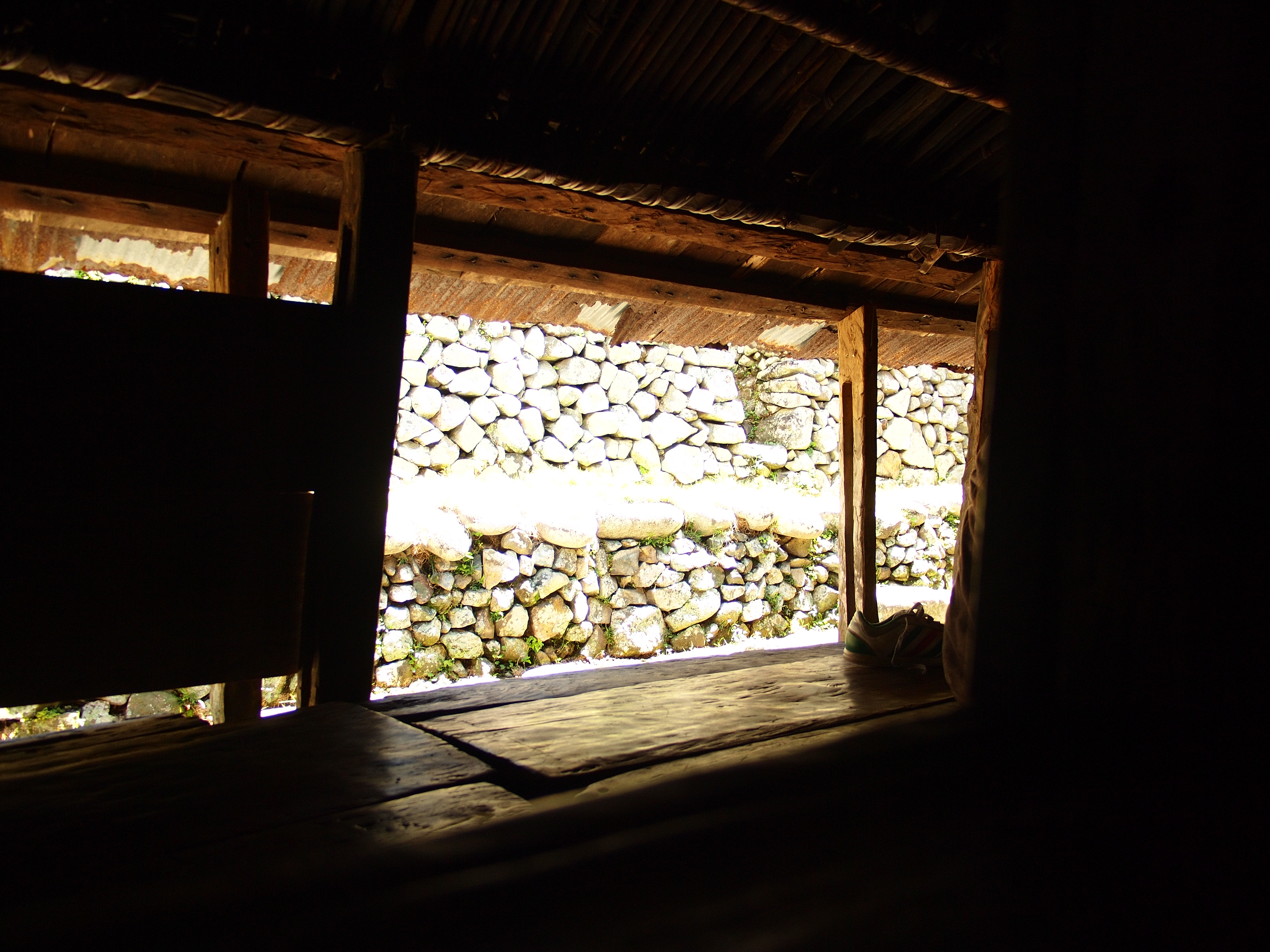
Inside a Tao house

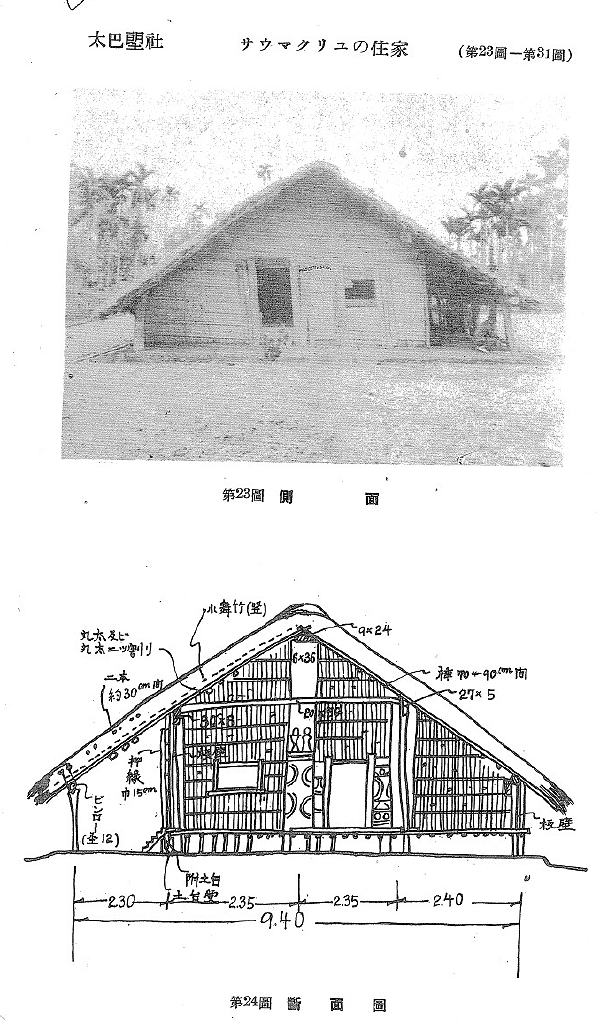
The Kakita'an ancestral house of the Amis people in Tafalong Tribe (太巴塱部落).

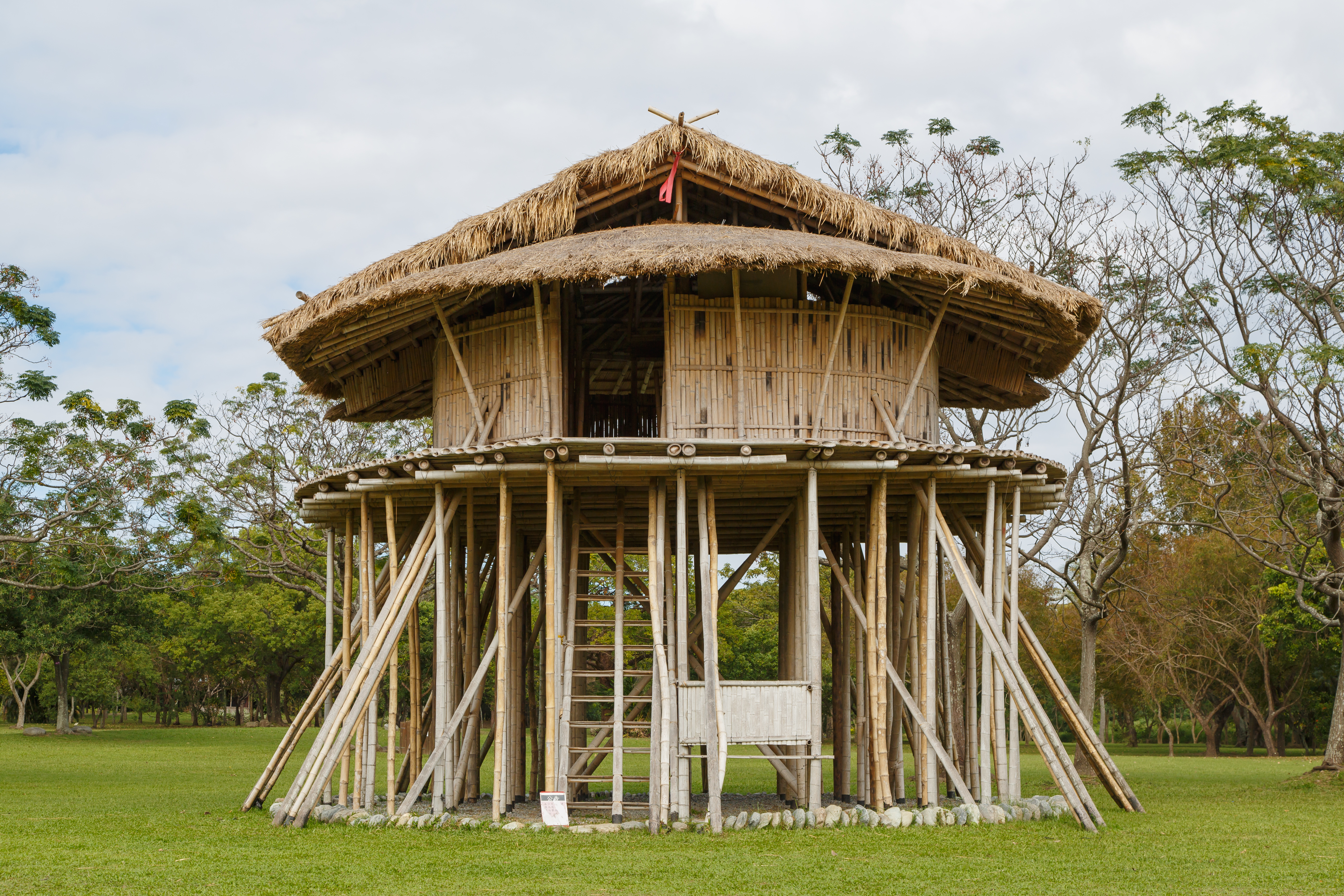
Stilt-house of the Puyuma people

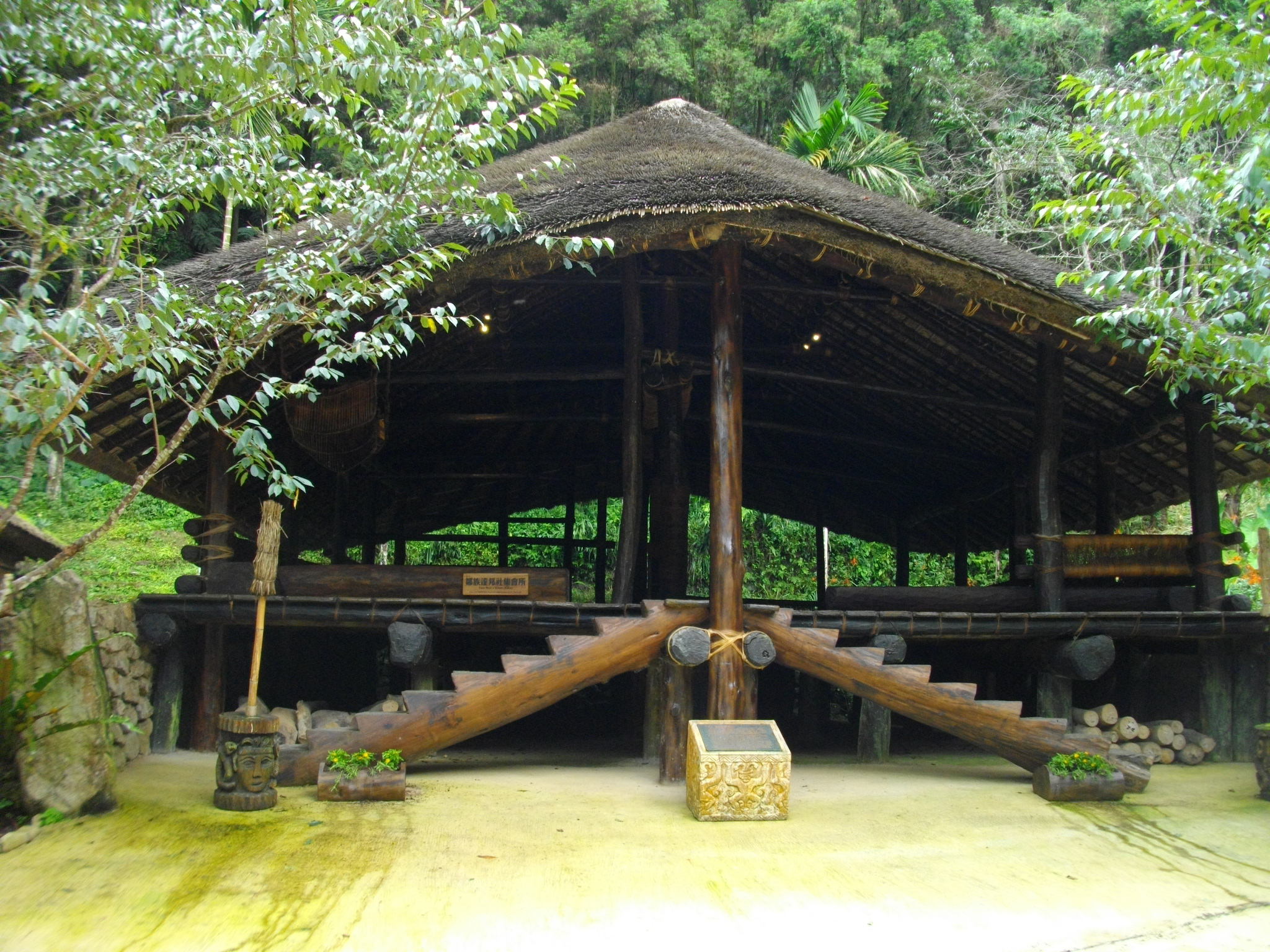
An imitation kuba (men's house) of the Tsou people in Formosan Aboriginal Culture Village

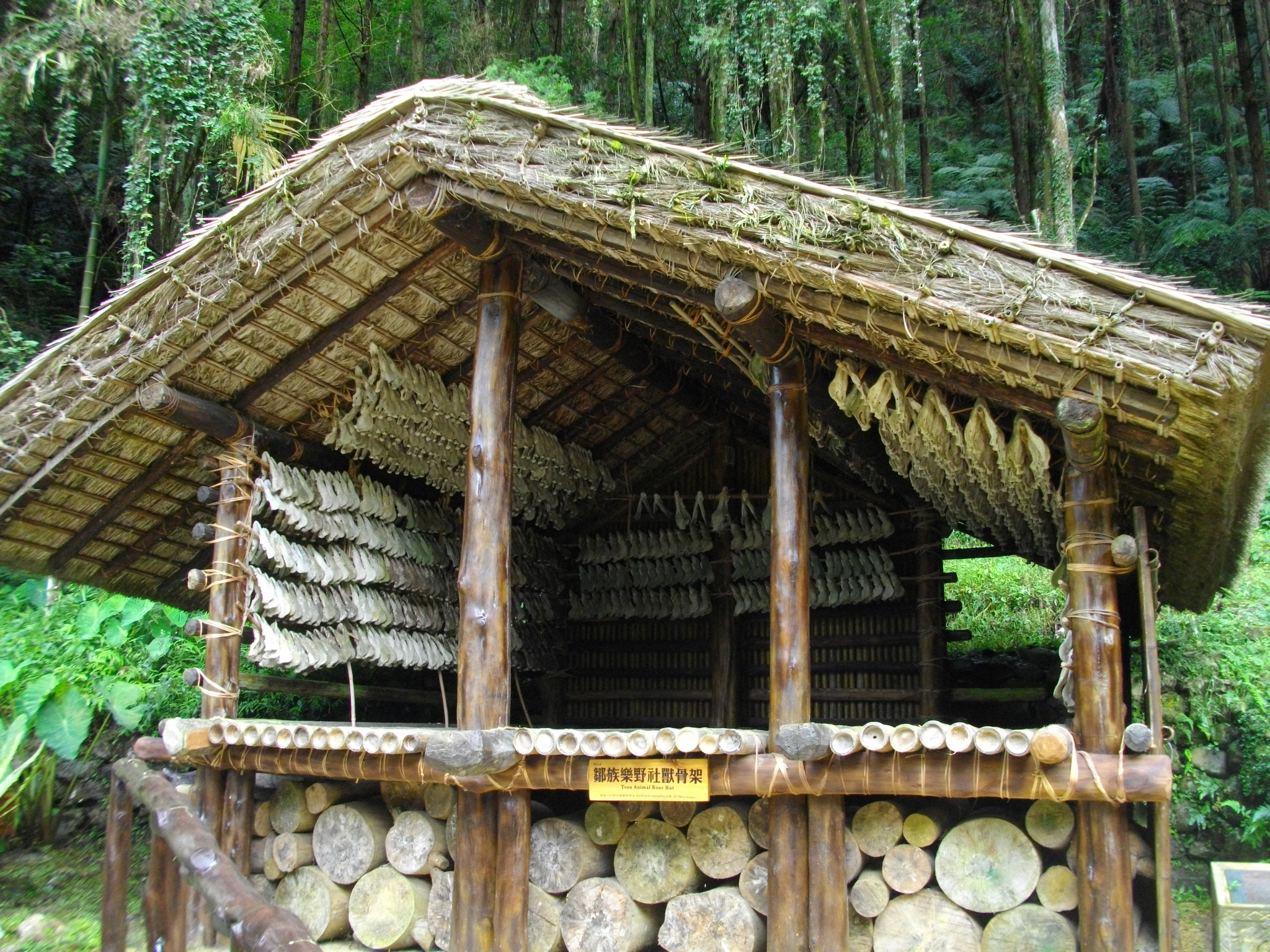
An imitation animal bone hut of the Tsou people in Formosan Aboriginal Culture Village

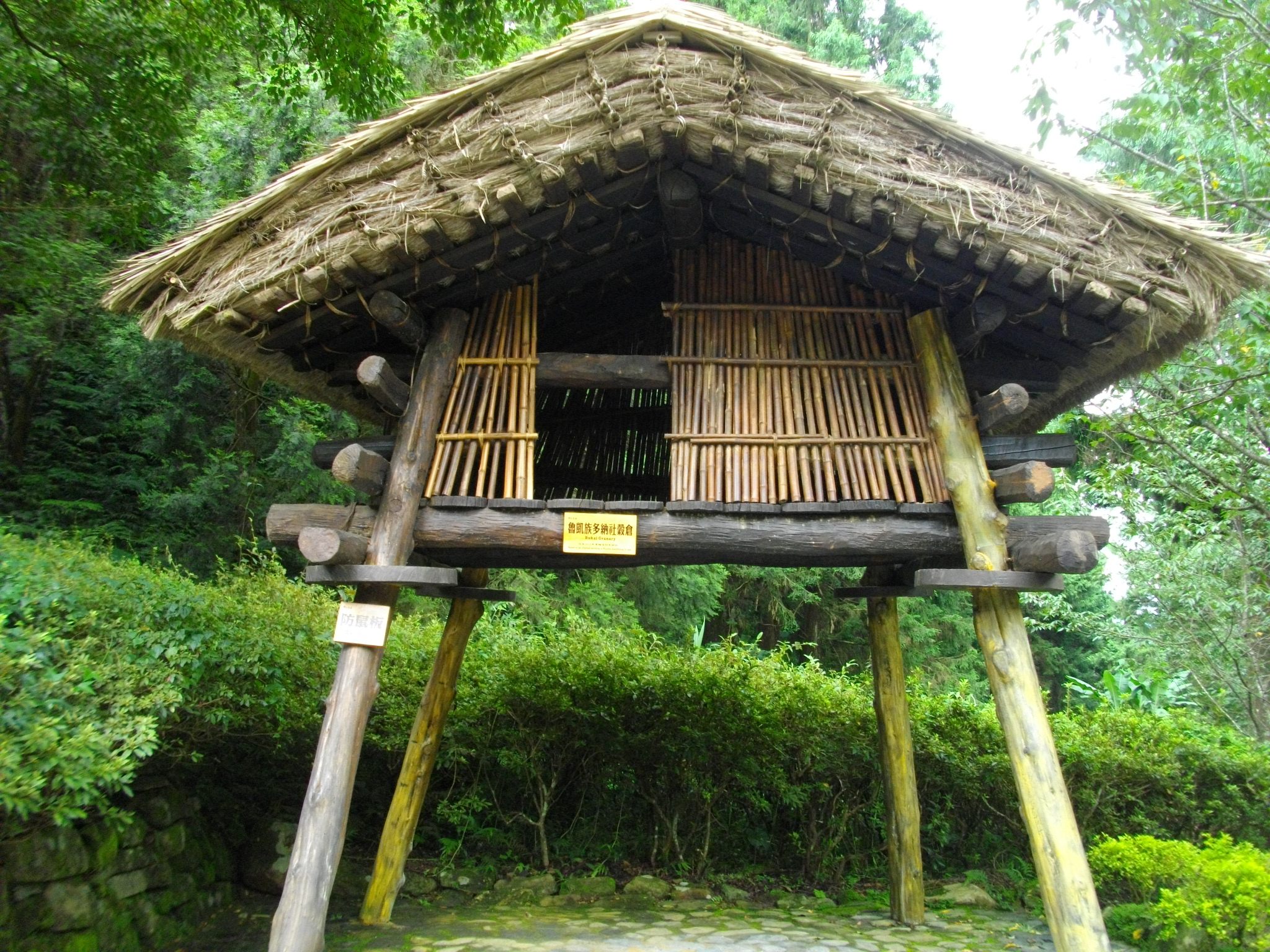
An imitation granary of the Rukai people in Formosan Aboriginal Culture Village

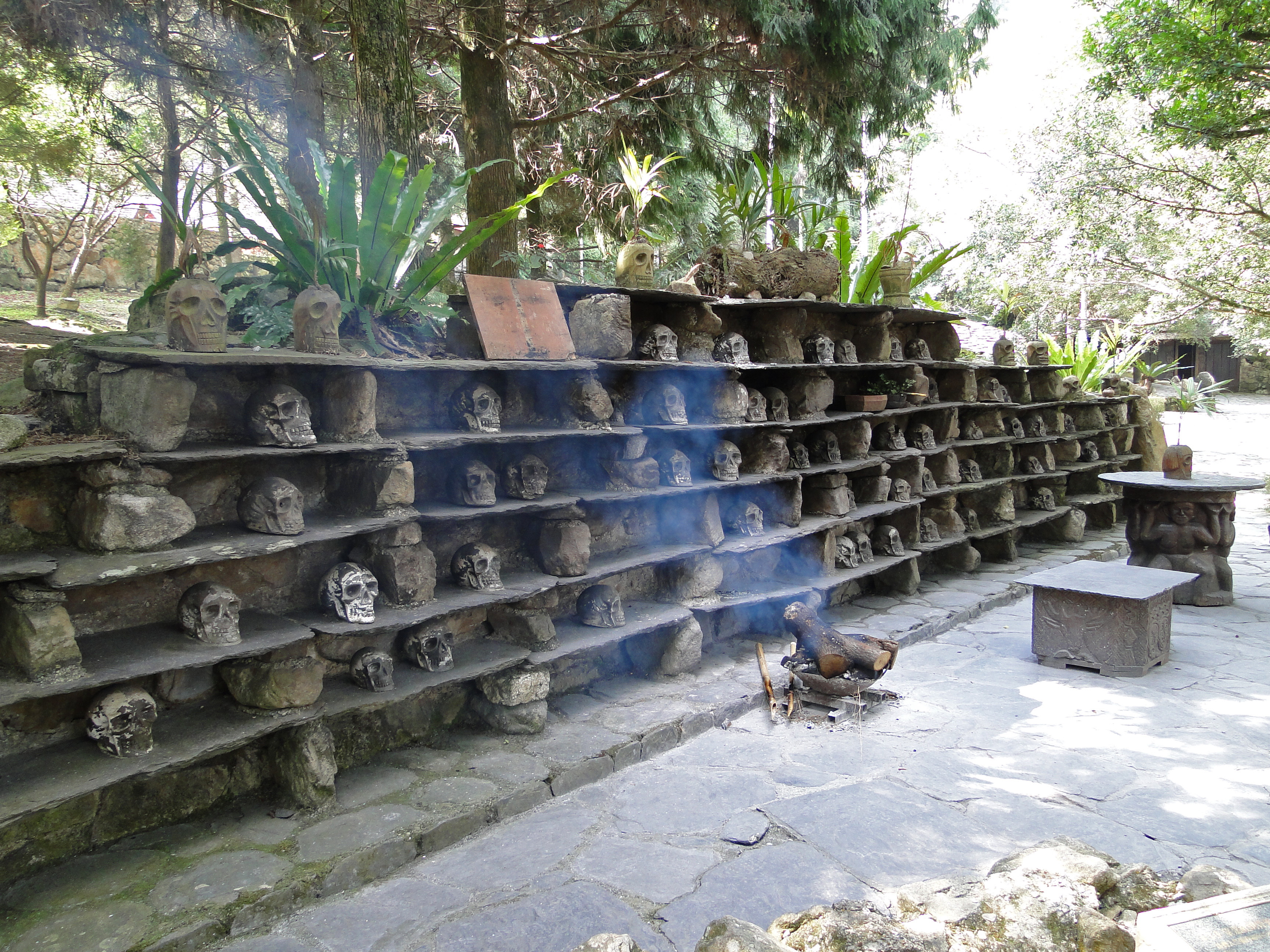
An imitation of a ceremonial rack of skulls of the Paiwan people in Formosan Aboriginal Culture Village

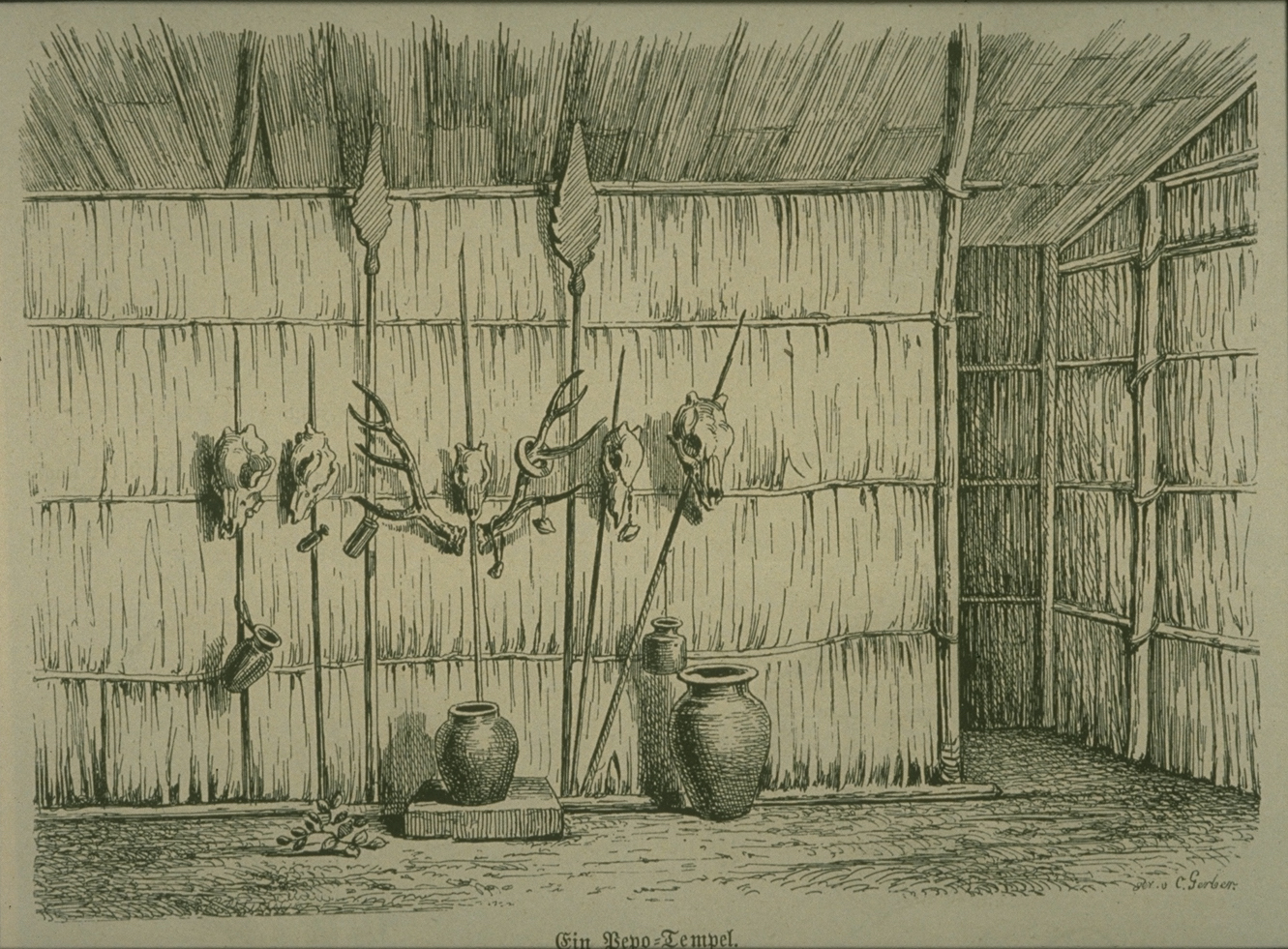
A temple (公廨) of the plains indigenous peoples

== Dutch and Spanish settlement (1624–1662) ==
The 16th century was a time of Western naval navigation, exploration and trade and also the shifting of power from the Ming dynasty to the Qing dynasty. Most of the architecture in Taiwan from this period were dominated by fortresses, primarily the Dutch Fengguiwei Fort, Fort Zeelandia, Fort Provintia in the south and the Spanish Fort San Salvador (聖薩爾瓦多城), Fort Santo Domingo to the north. The Dutch used red bricks in construction while the Spanish used stone. Both sides made use of ports and constructed fortresses to consolidate their power on the island. The fortresses were square shaped with an additional side for the installment of artillery. This period saw Taiwan architecture enter the peak of Western colonization. Such structures from this period represent the first generation of architectural works and is now listed as a world heritage by the Republic of China government.

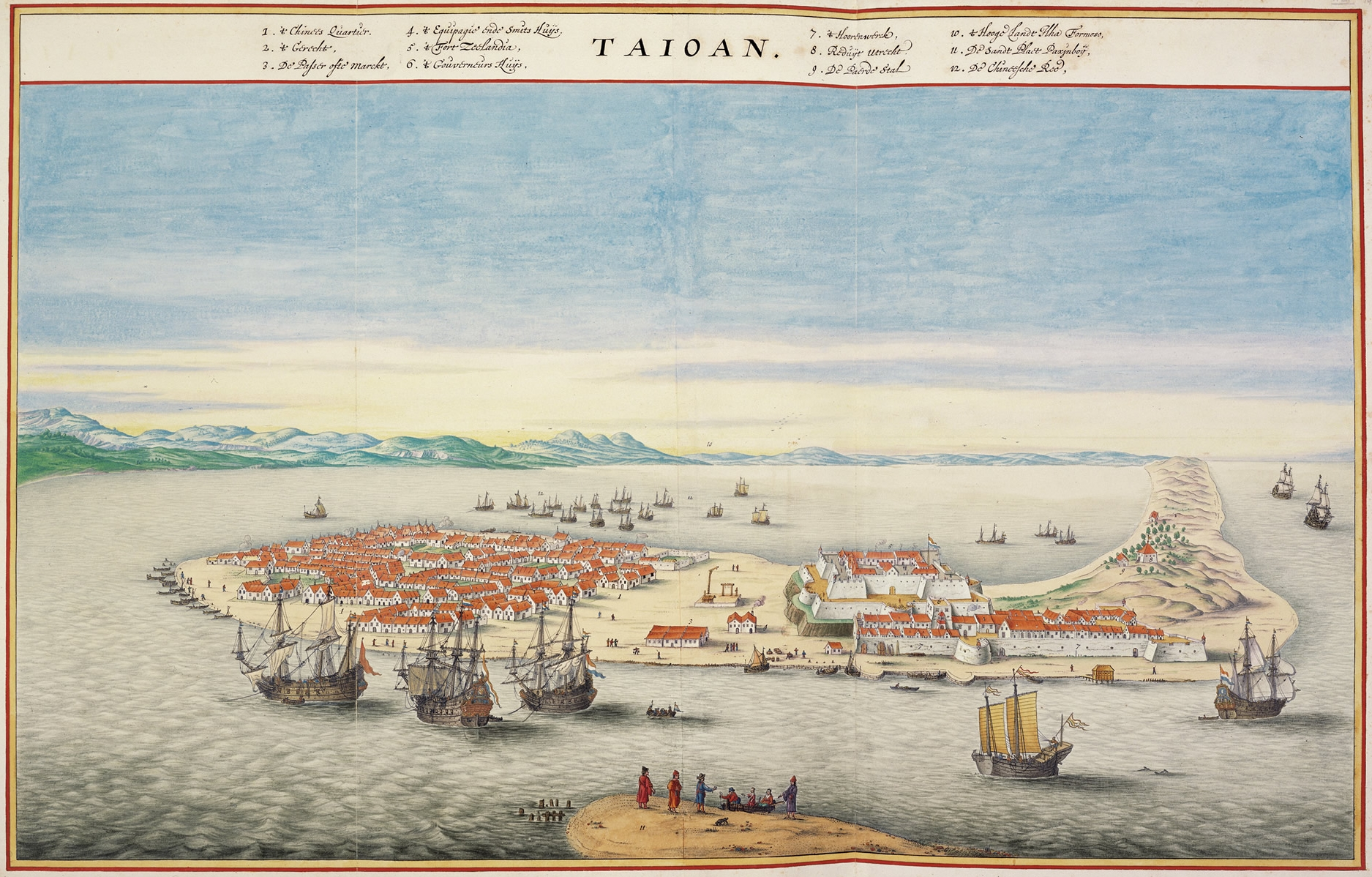
Taioan Street (大員市街) was built by the Dutch and is now the present day Yanping Street (延平街) in Anping District, Tainan City.

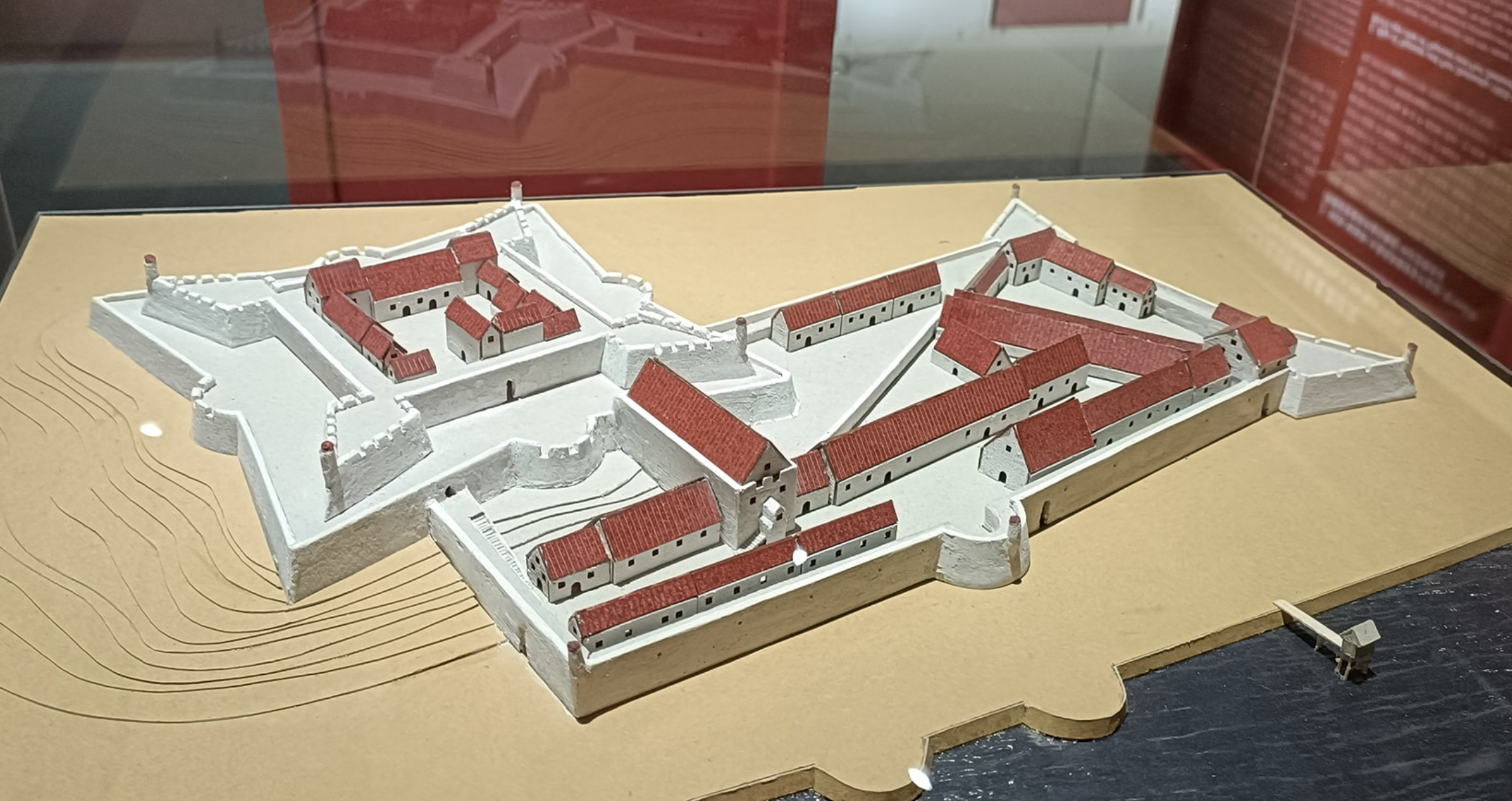
Fort Zeelandia was built by the Dutch in 1624 and is now known as Anping Fort (安平古堡).

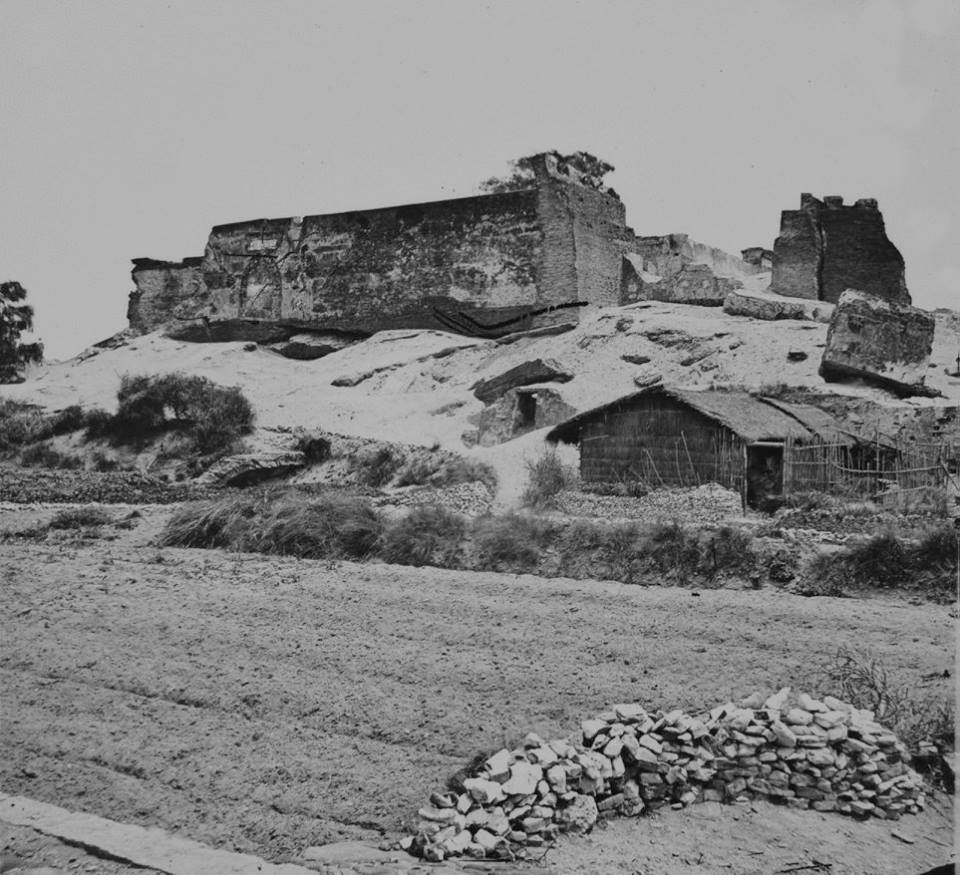
Remains of Fort Zeelandia in 1871

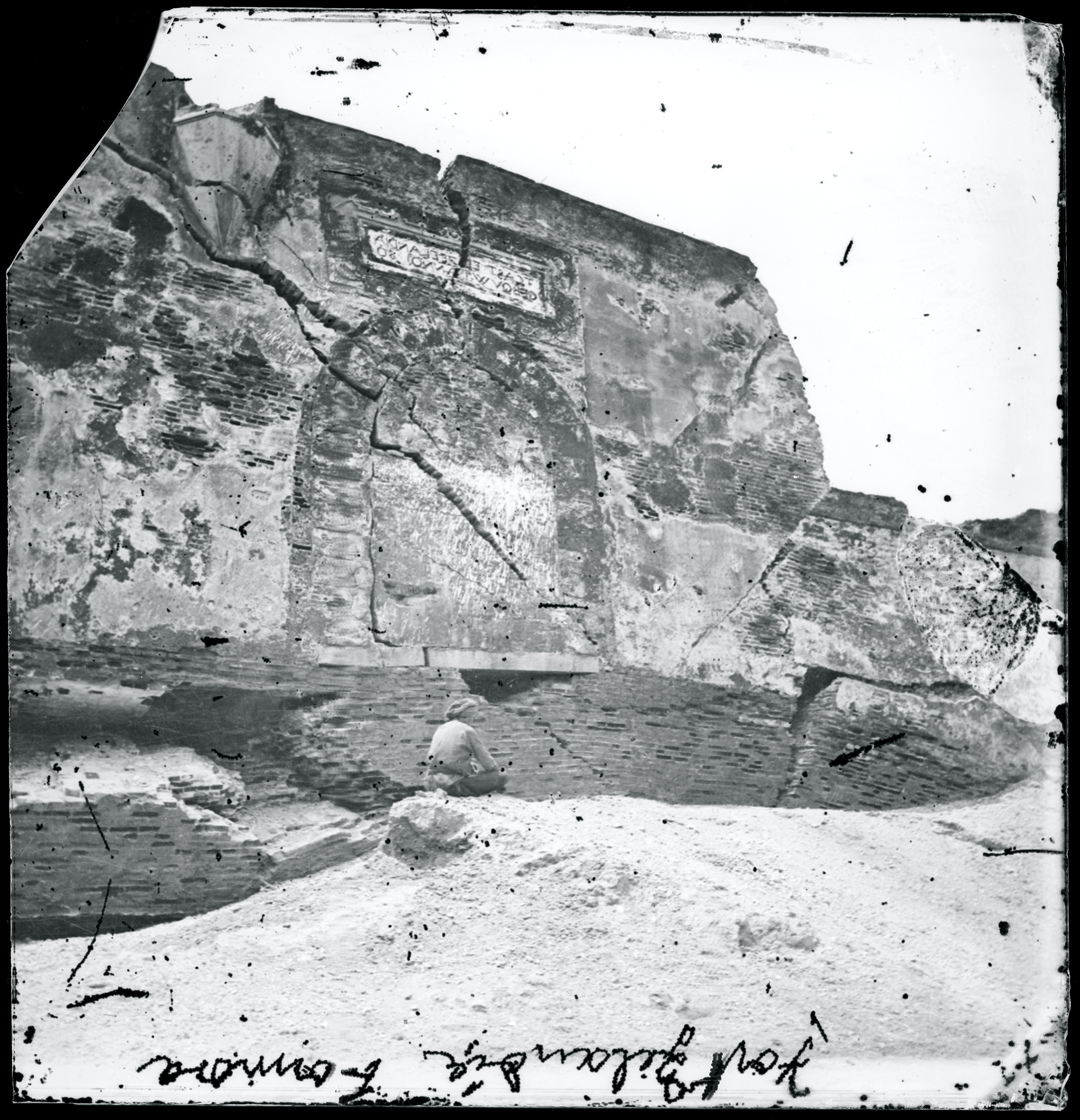
Remains of Fort Zeelandia in 1871

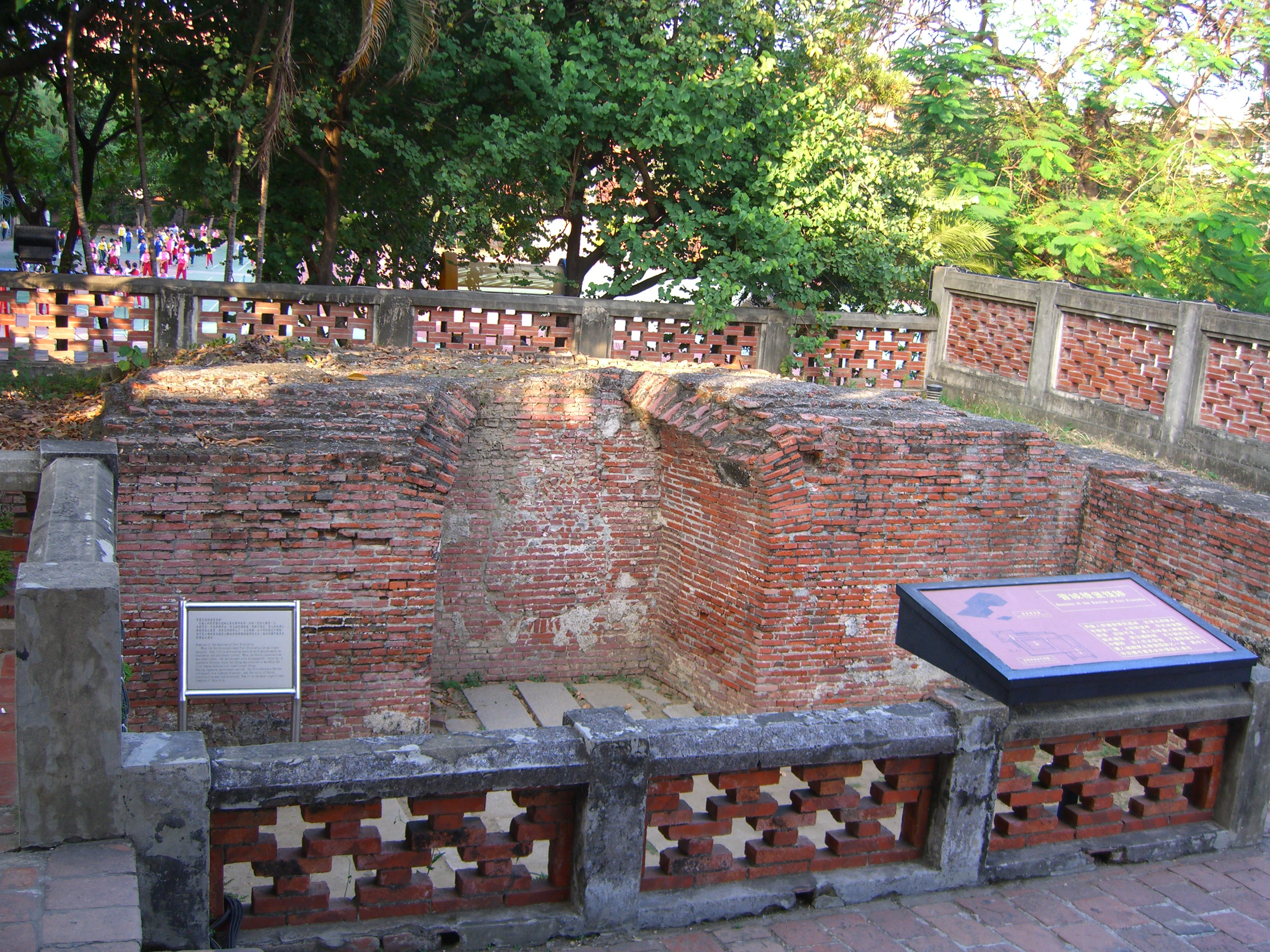
Fort Provintia was a bastion structure, the remains of which are now known as Chihkan Tower (赤崁樓).

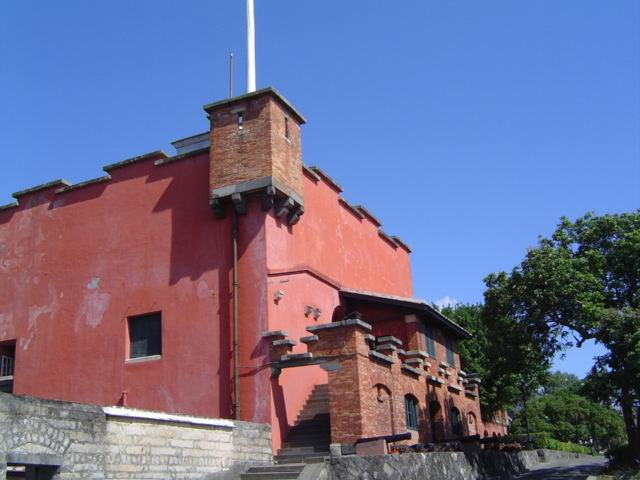
Fort Santo Domingo was built by the Spanish in 1628 and after their defeat was rebuilt by the Dutch. It is known as Âng-mn̂g-siâⁿ (紅毛城, Red-haired Fort) after the Dutch people.

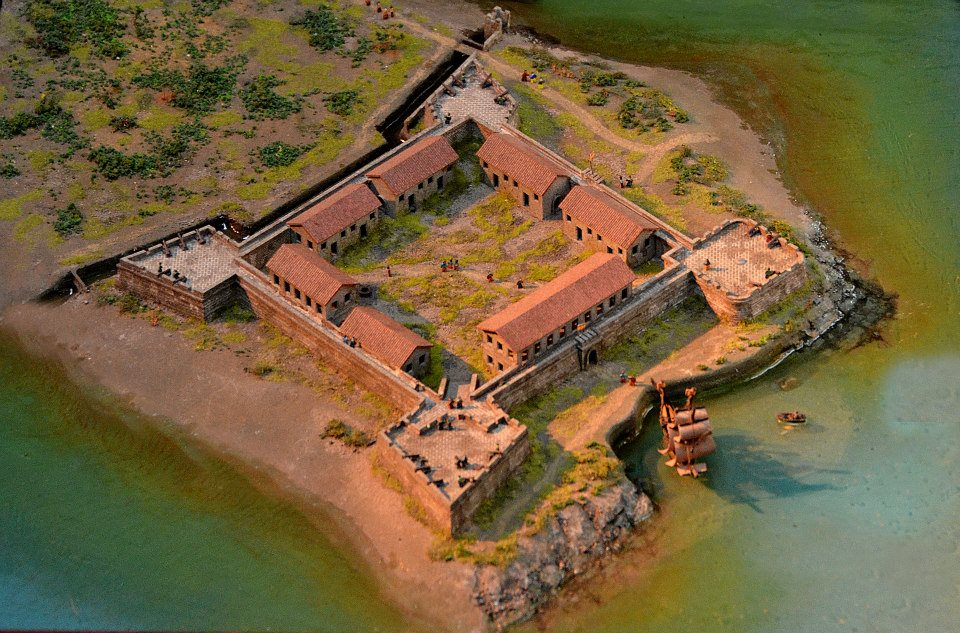
Model of Fort San Salvador in Keelung City

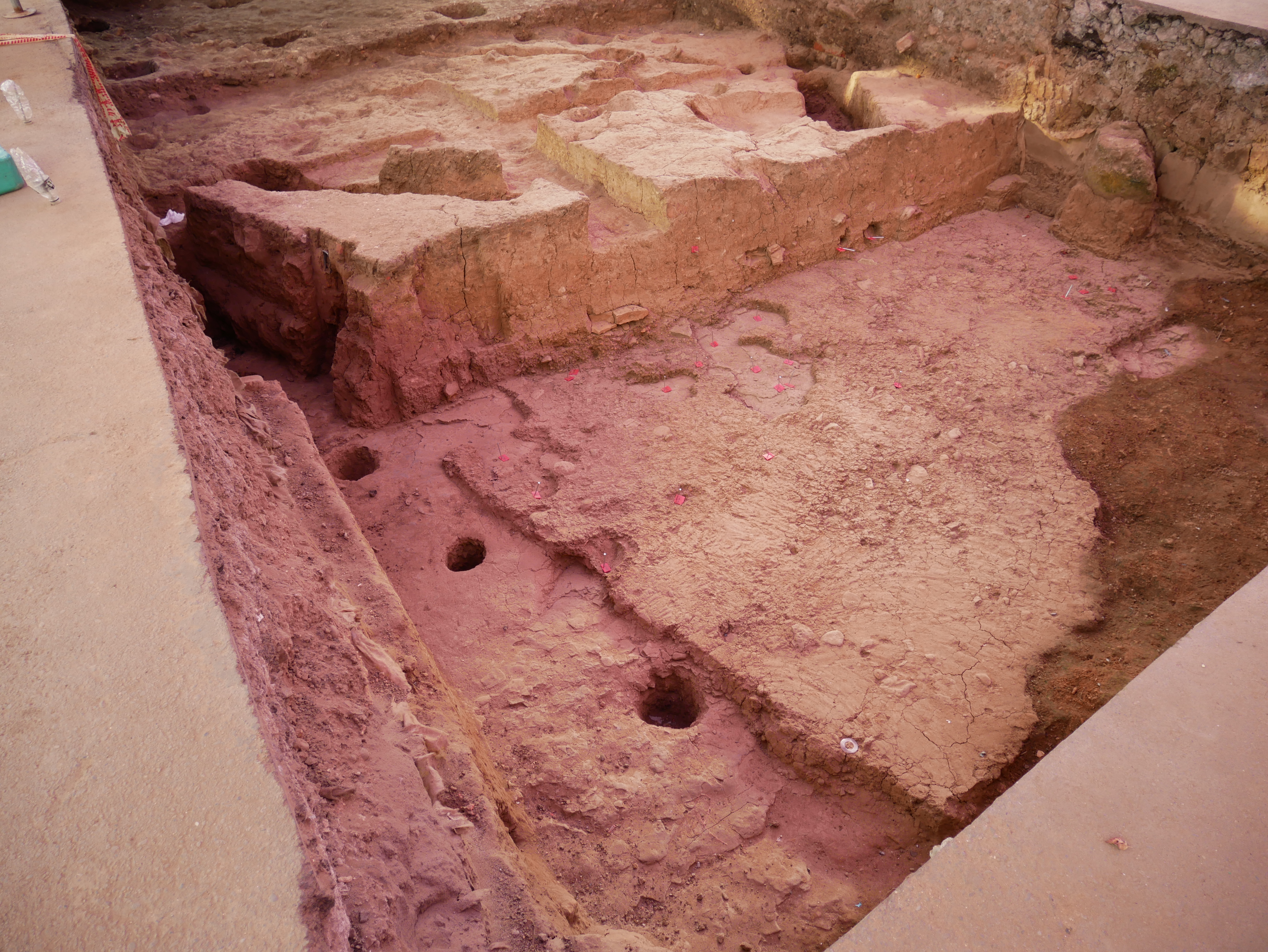
Archaeological excavation pit of Todos los Santos (諸聖堂) near Fort San Salvador

== Kingdom of Tungning (1662–1682) ==
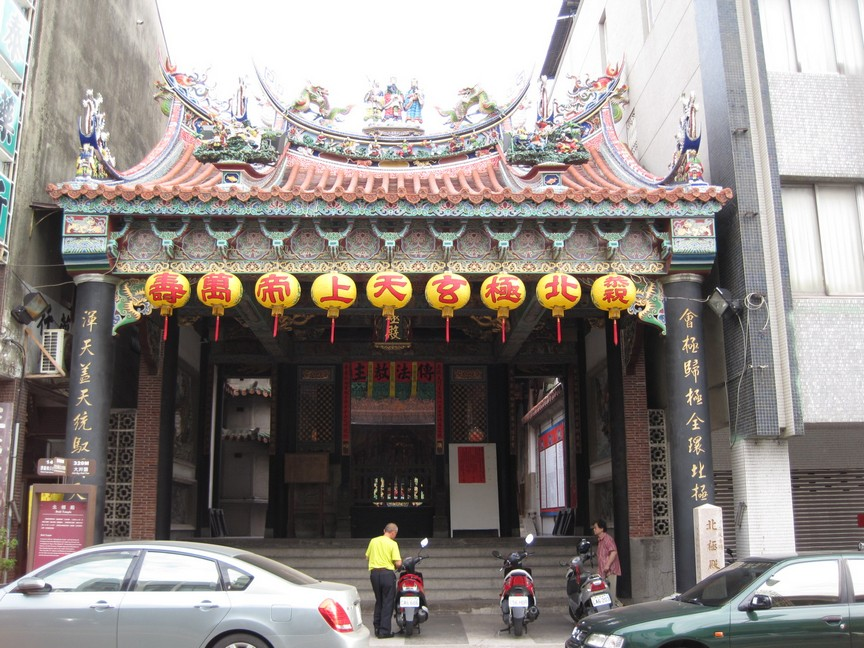
Beiji Temple (北極殿), Tainan City(1661), rebuilt in 1709.

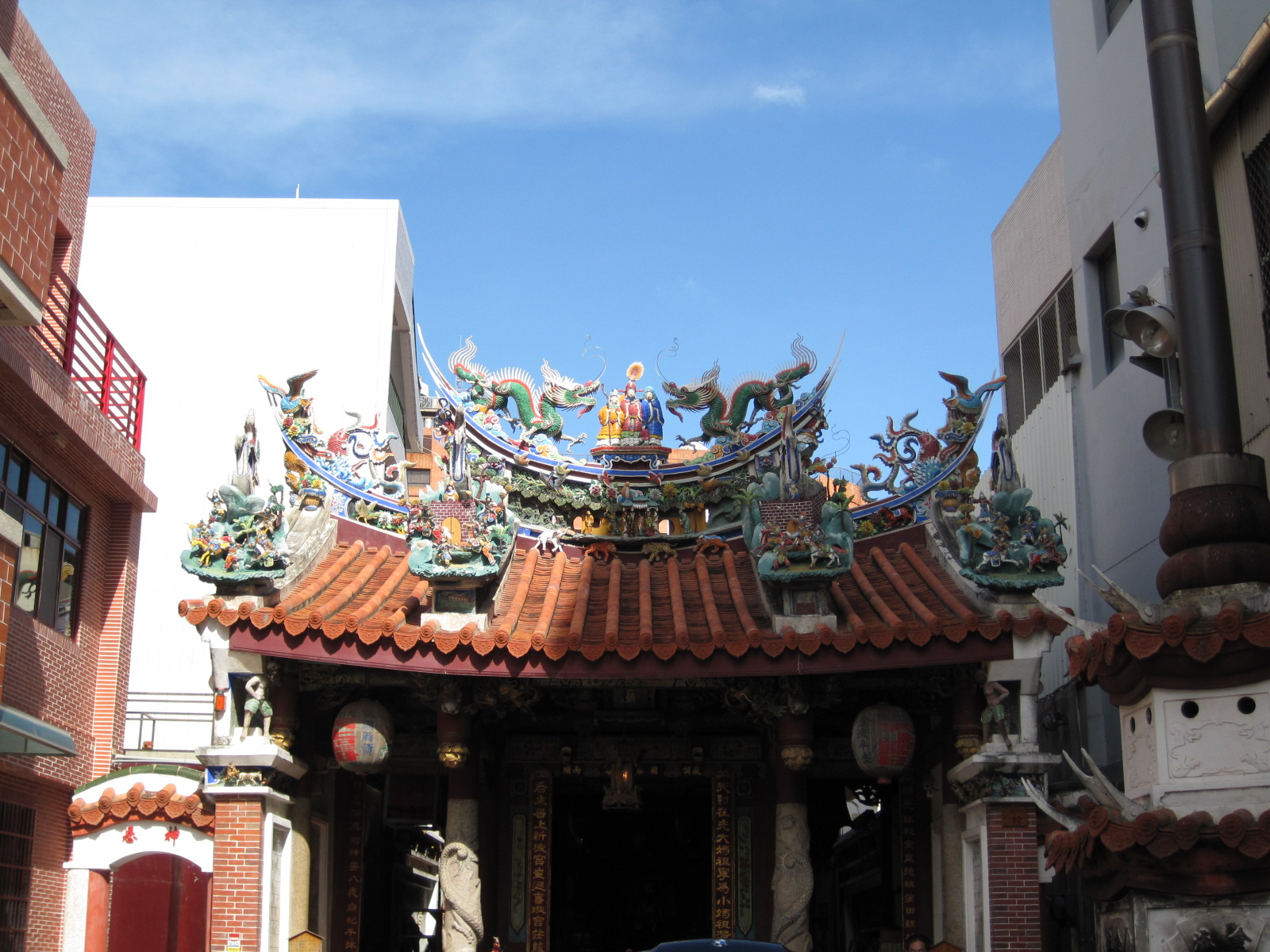
Kaichi Matsu Temple / Kaiji Tianhou Temple (開基天后宮, Taiwanese: Khai-ki Thian-hiō-kiong) in Tainan City is one of the earliest temples dedicated to Mazu, rebuilt in 1926.

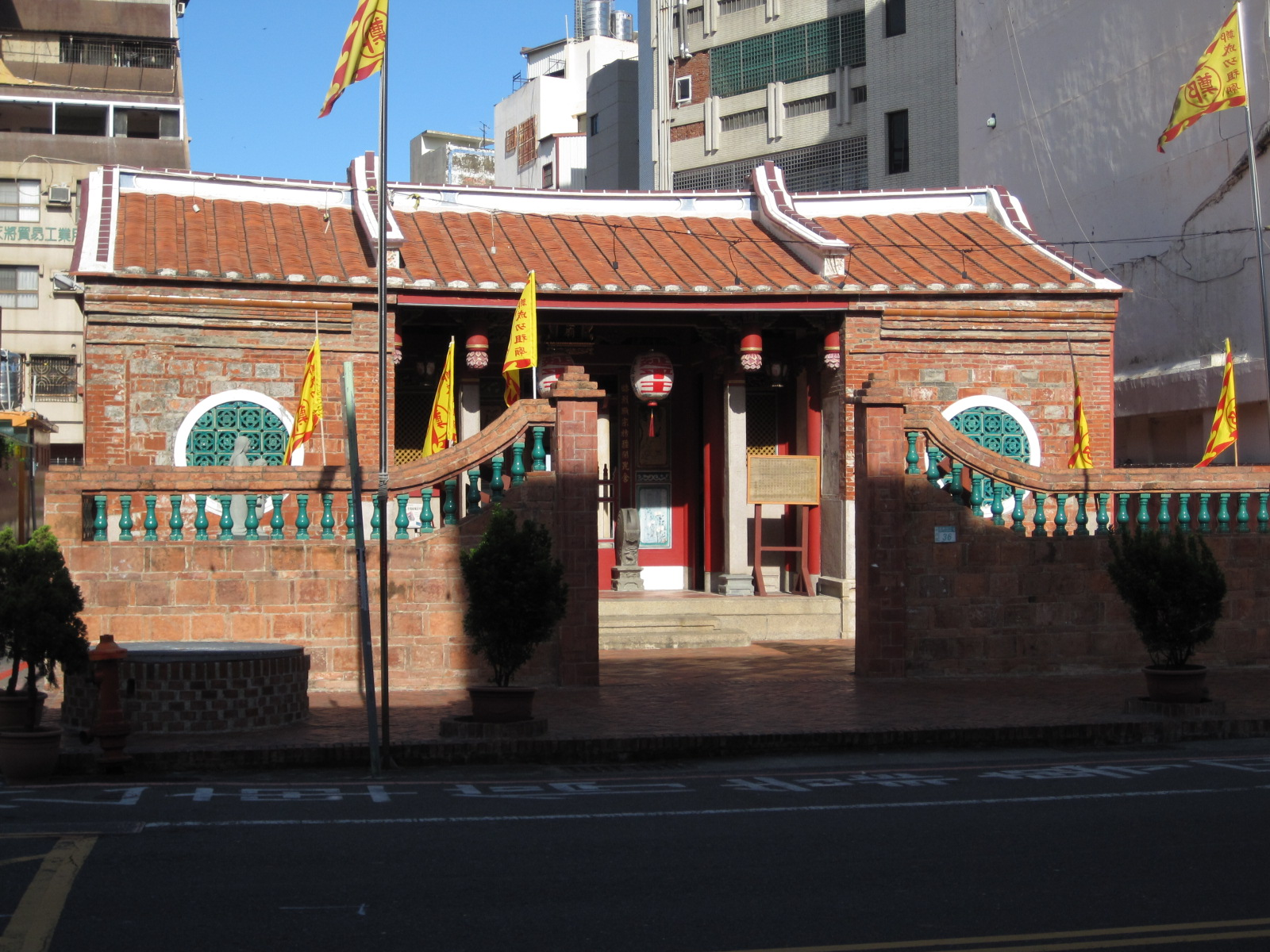
Koxinga Ancestral Shrine, Tainan City

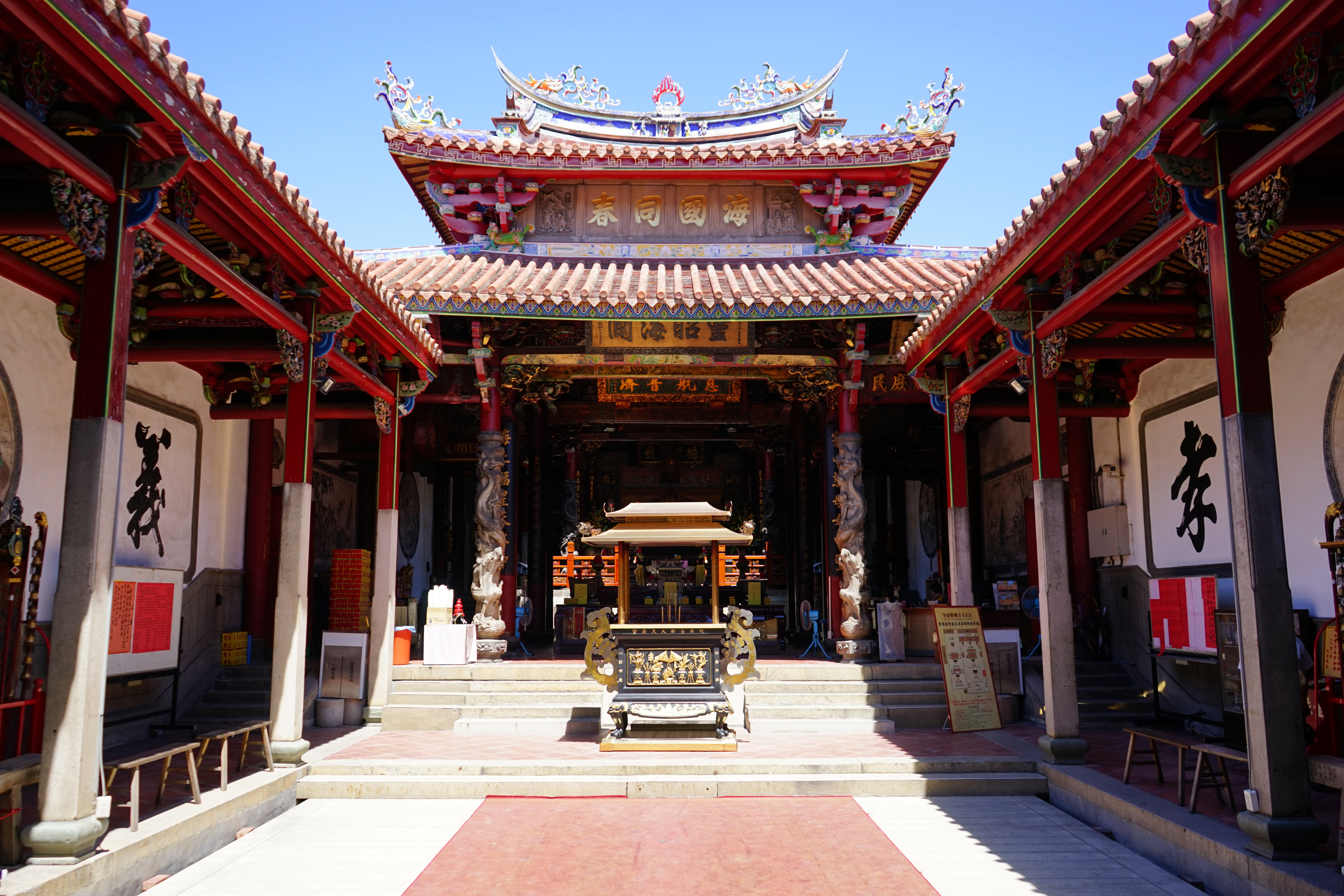
Grand Matsu Temple in Tainan City used to be the palace of Prince Ningjing of Southern Ming dynasty, rebuilt in the Qing dynasty.

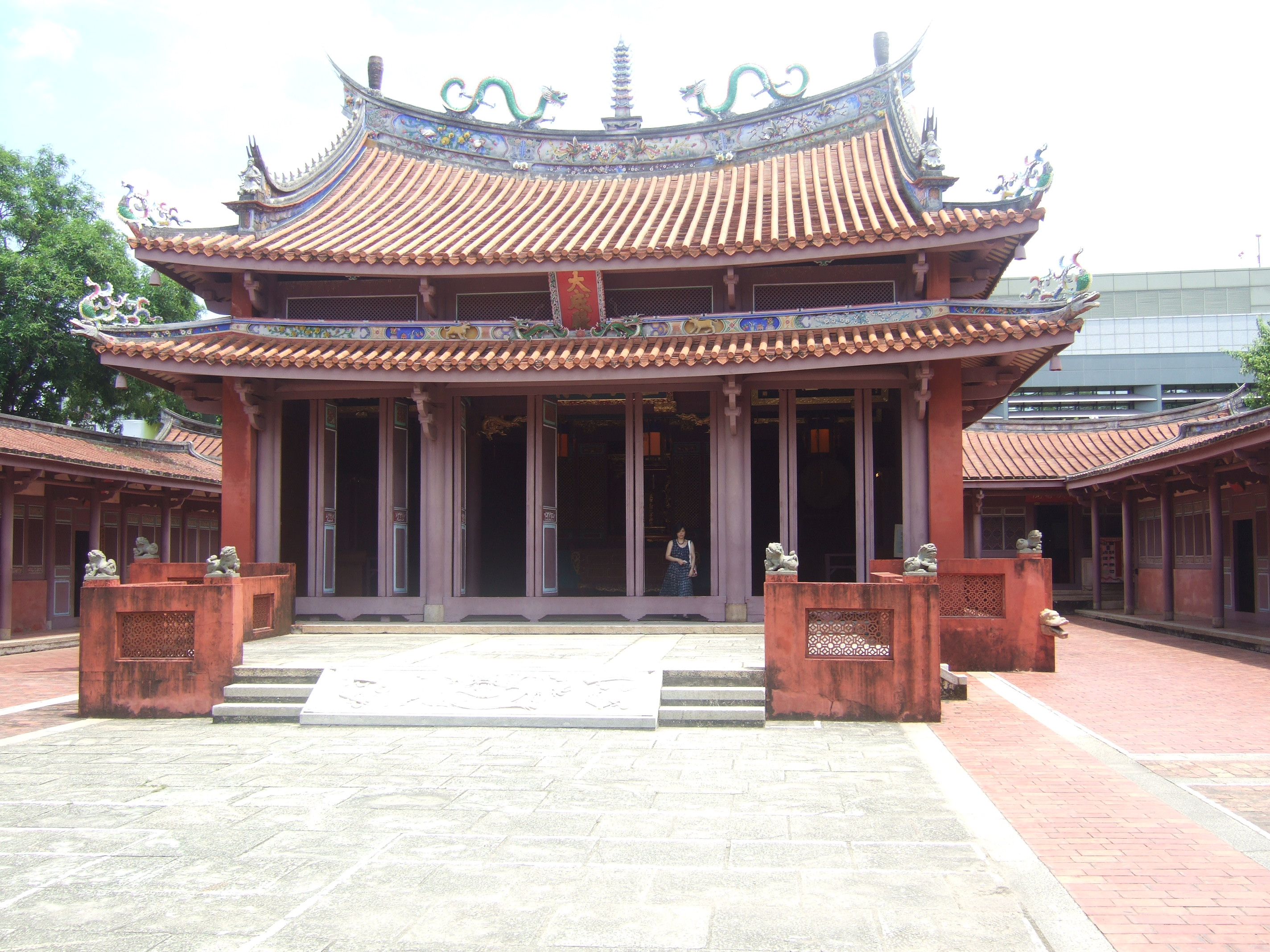
Taiwan Confucian Temple, Tainan City (1665), rebuilt in 1751.

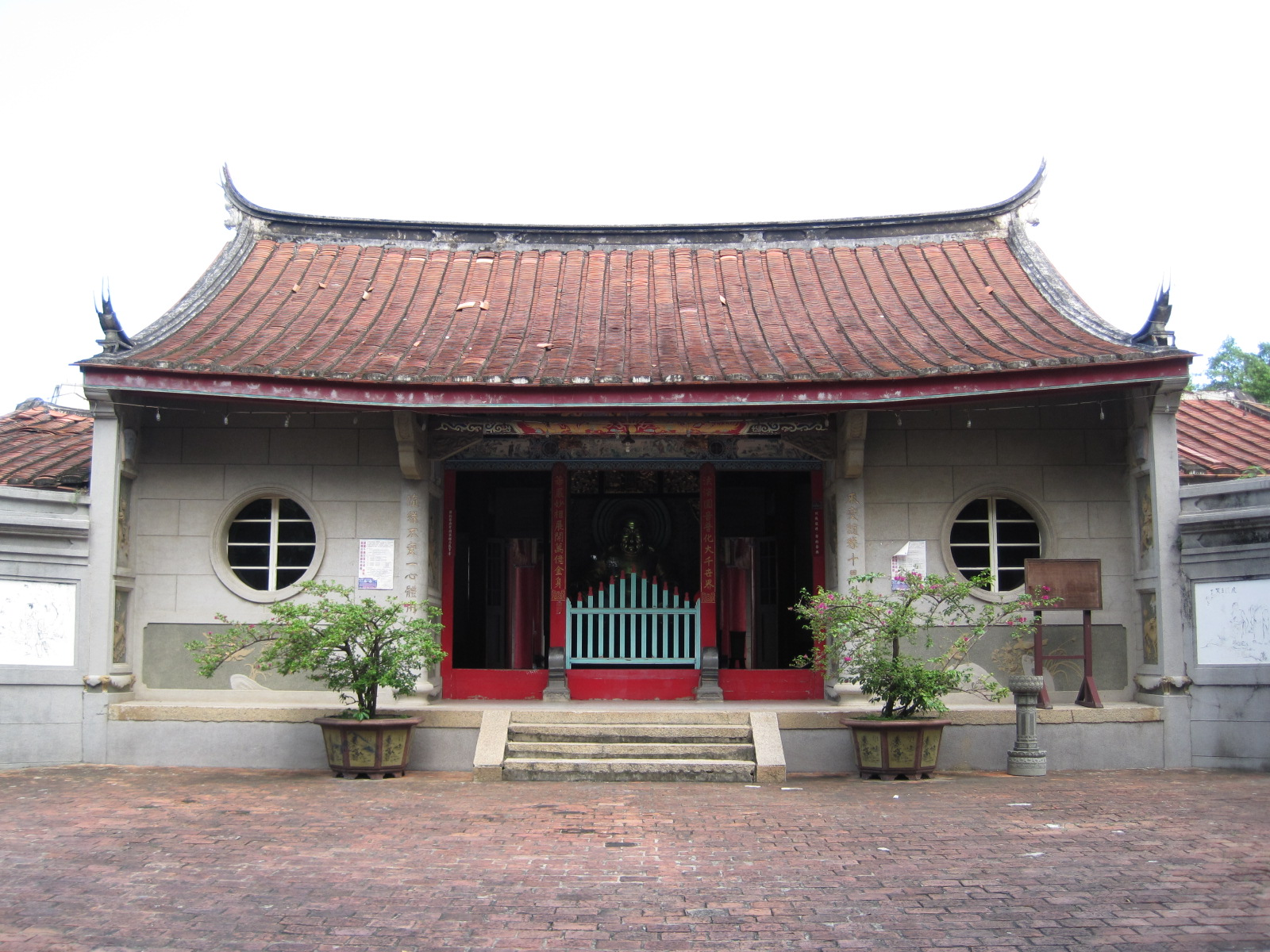
Fahua Temple (法華寺) in Tainan City was the former residence known as the Dream Butterfly Garden (夢蝶園 Mengdieyuan) of Li Maochun (李茂春), rebuilt in 1959.

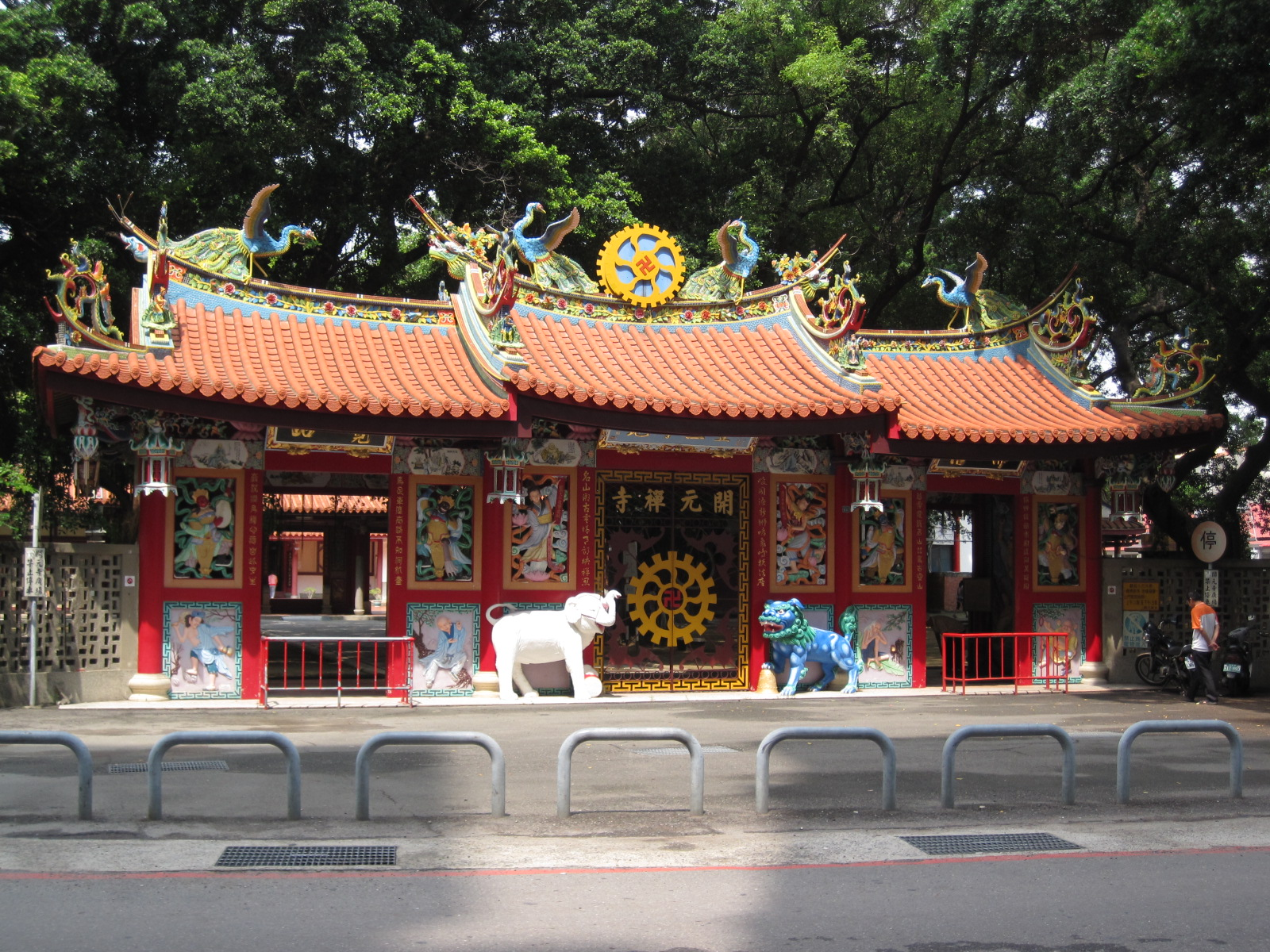
Kaiyuan Temple (開元寺), Tainan City, rebuilt in 1680.

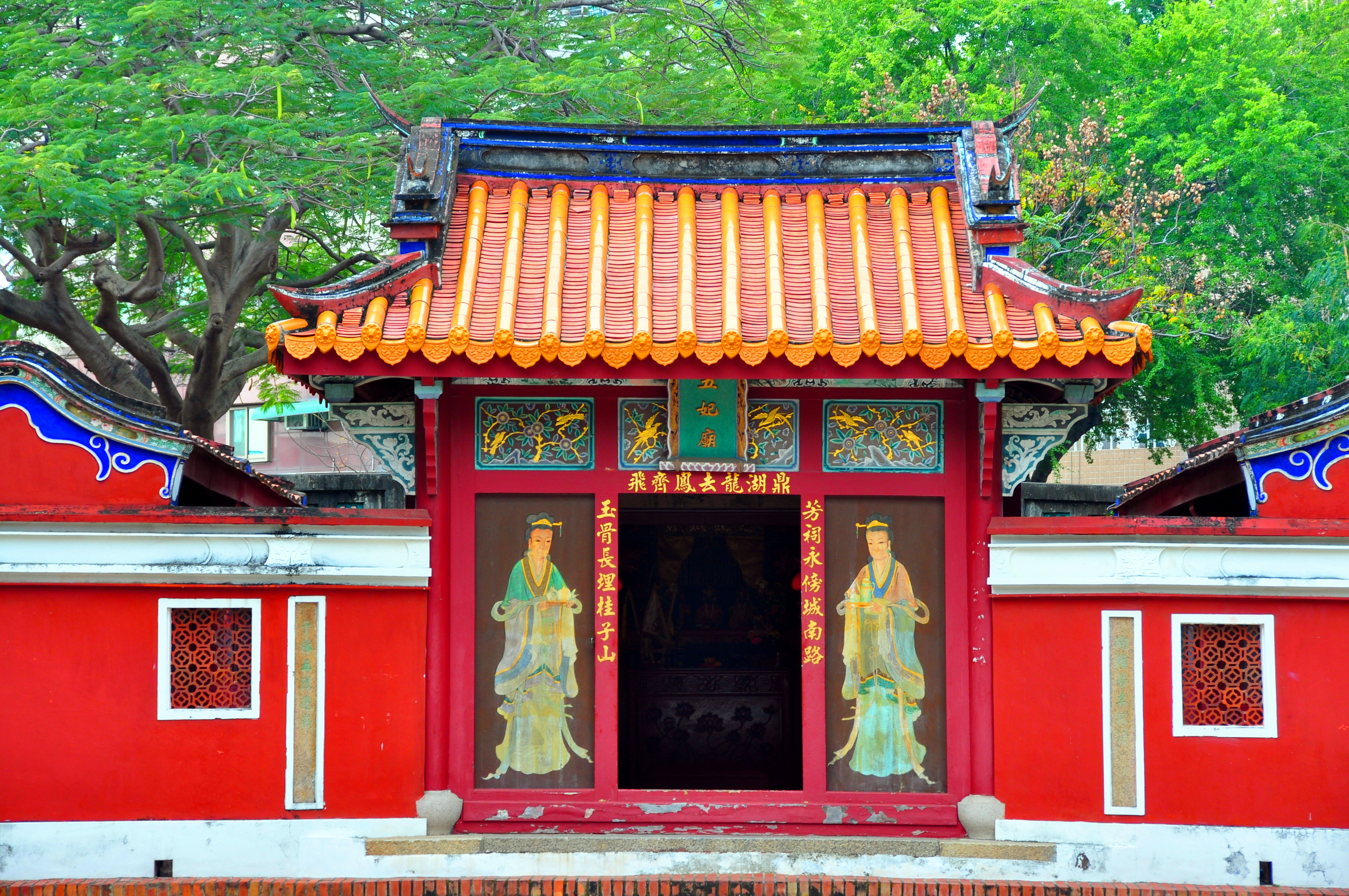
Temple of the Five Concubines, Tainan City (1683), extended in 1746.

== Qing dynasty (1683–1896) ==
Minnan-style architecture

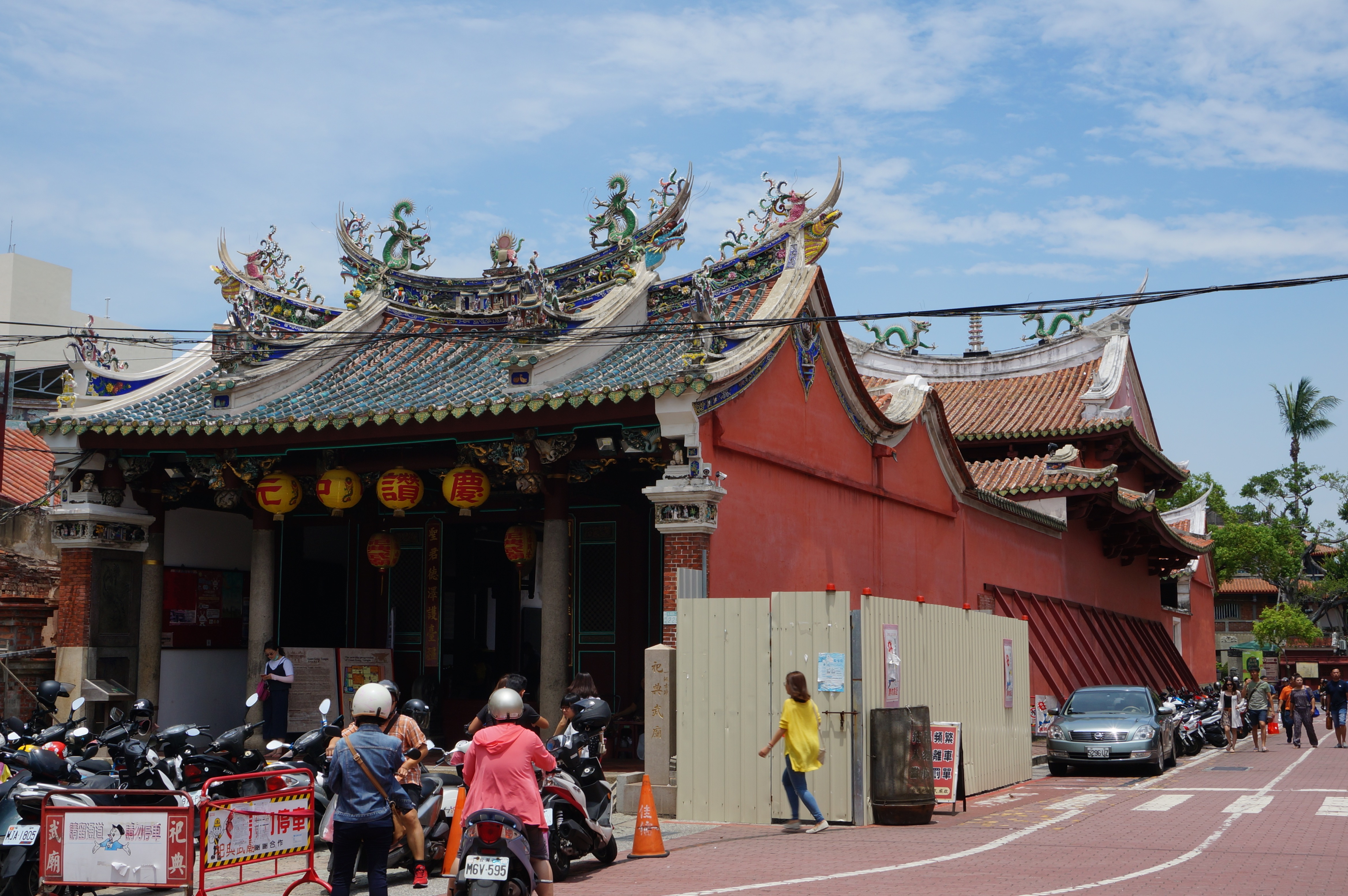
State Temple of the Martial God (祀典武廟), Tainan City

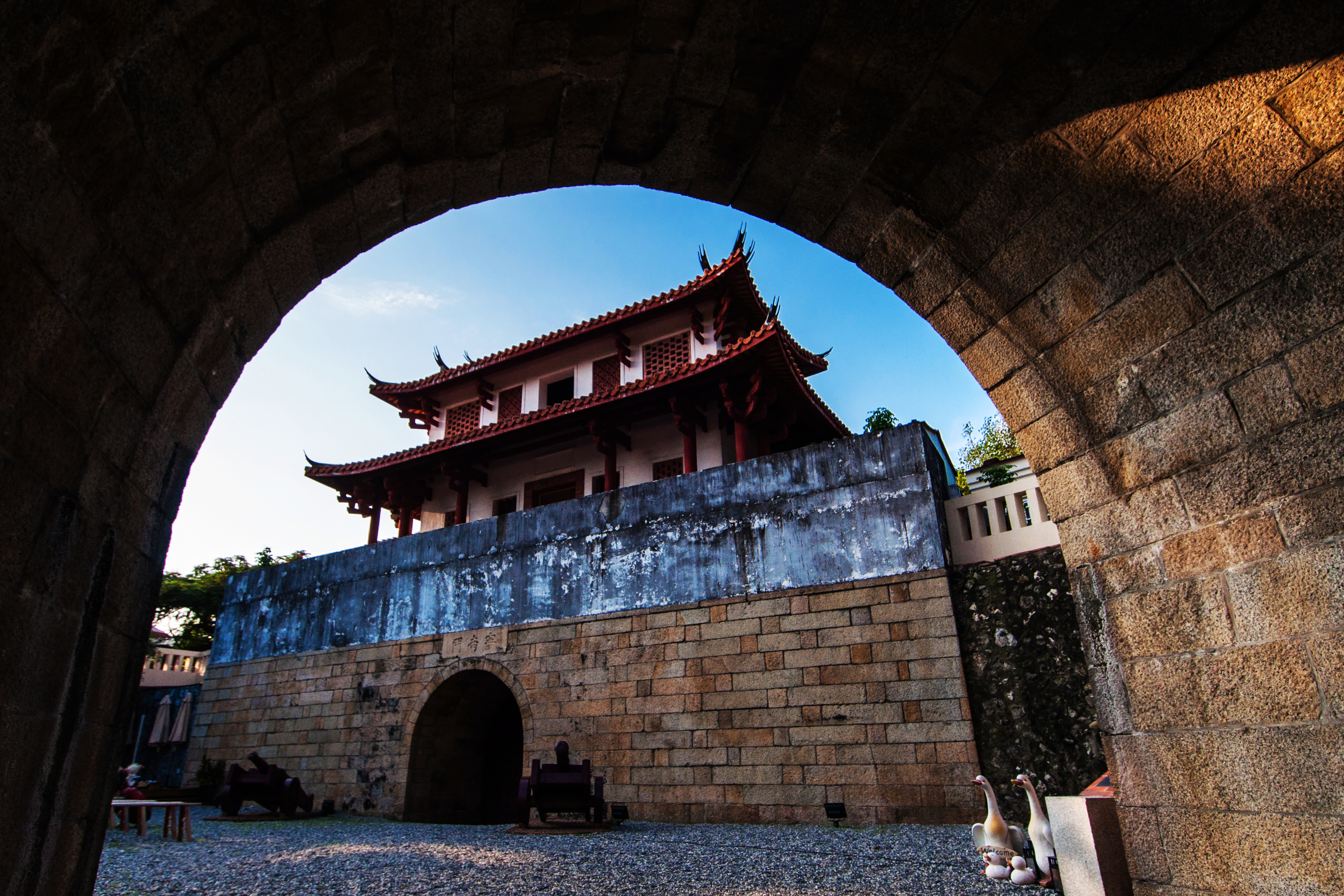
Great South Gate of Tainan Prefecture (台南府城大南門), Tainan City

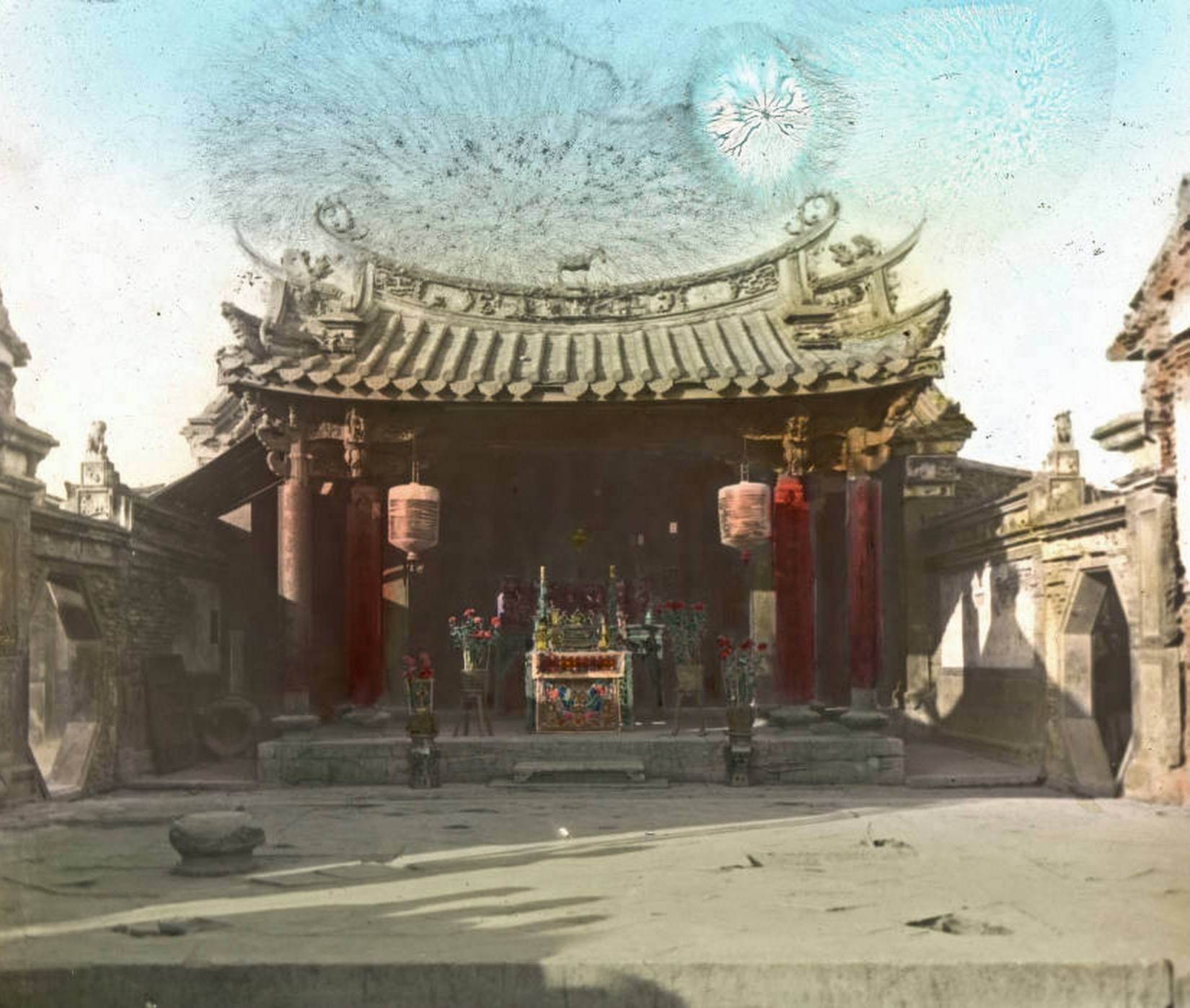
Chaotian Temple (朝天宮), Yunlin County

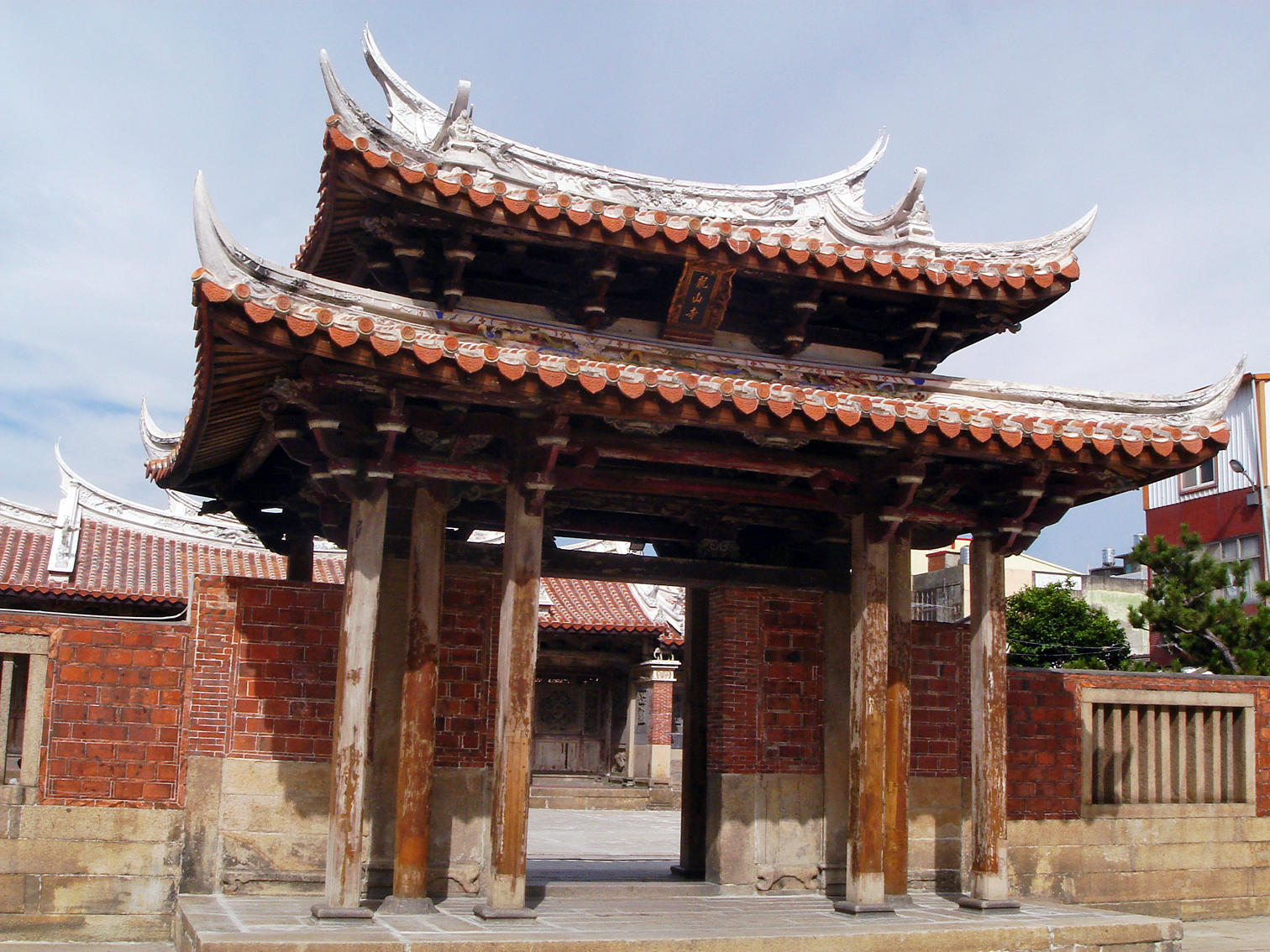
Lukang Longshan Temple (鹿港龍山寺), Changhua County

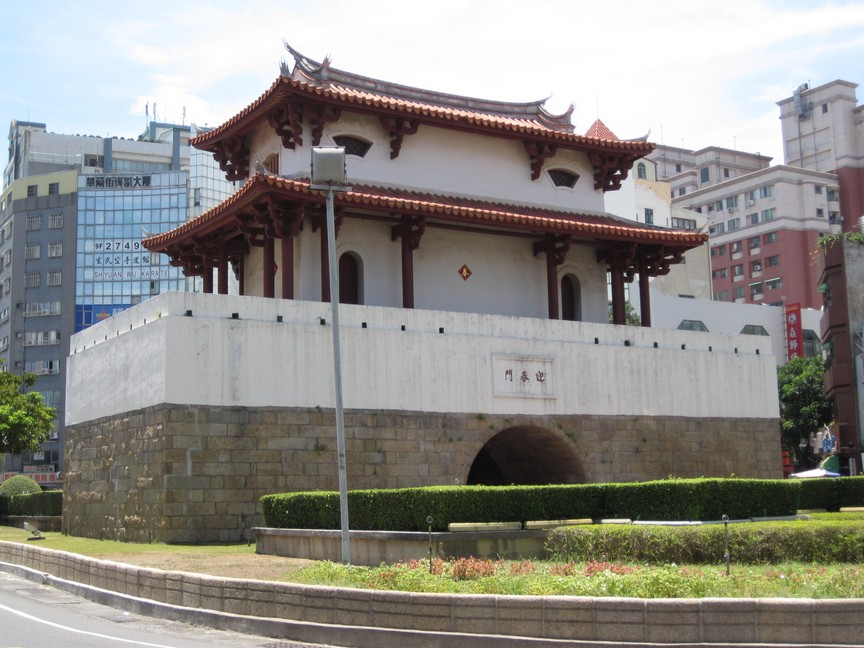
Great East Gate of Tainan Prefecture (台南府城大東門), Tainan City

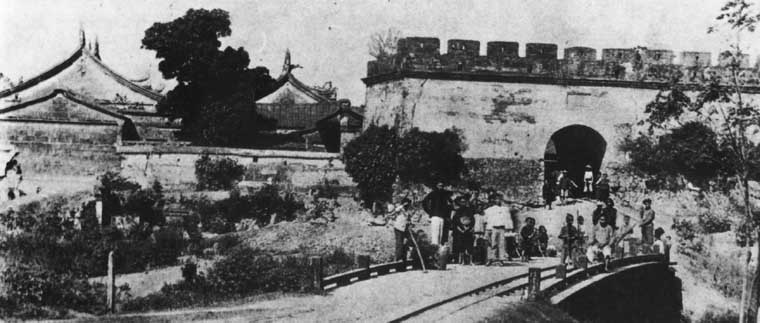
East Gate of Fengshan New City (鳳山縣新城東門), Kaohsiung City

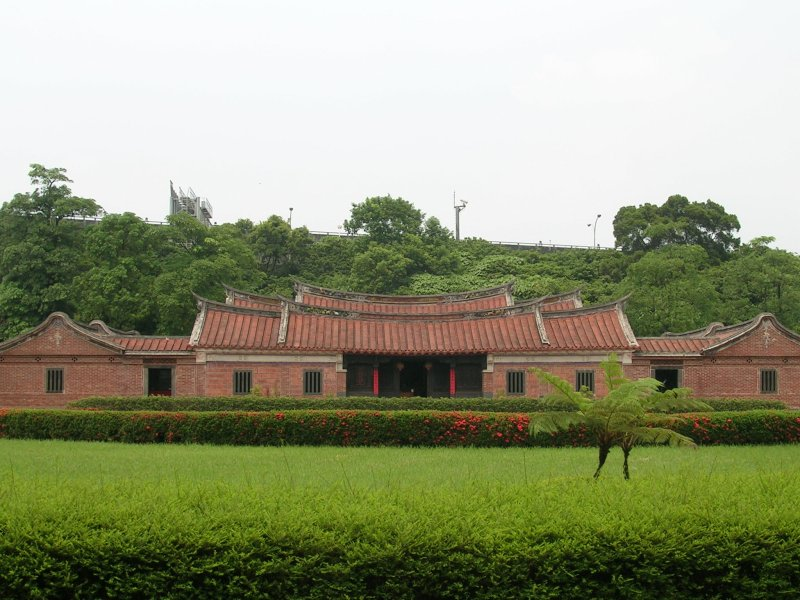
Lin An Tai Historical House and Museum (林安泰古厝), Taipei City

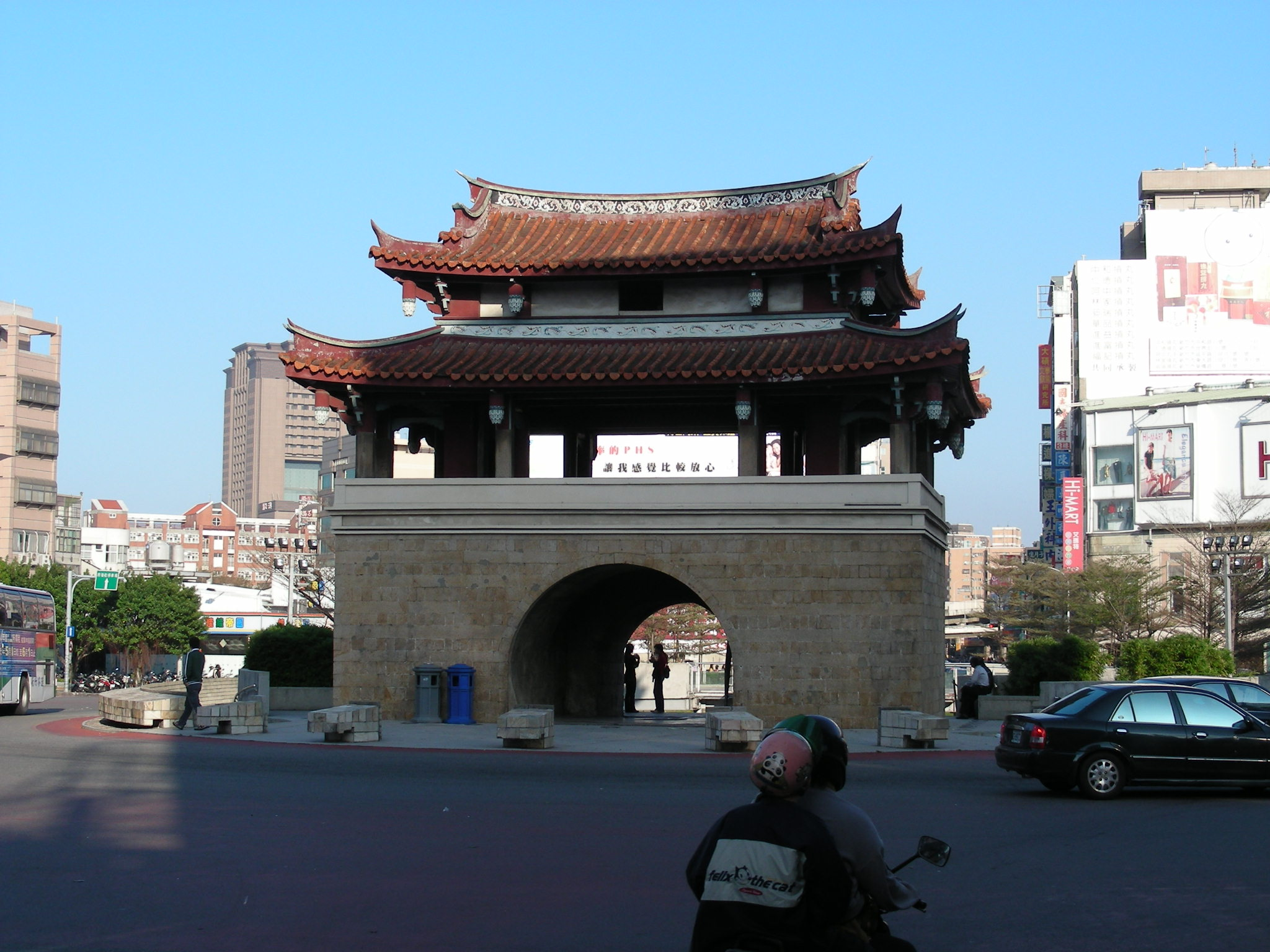
Yensi Gate (迎曦門), Hsinchu City

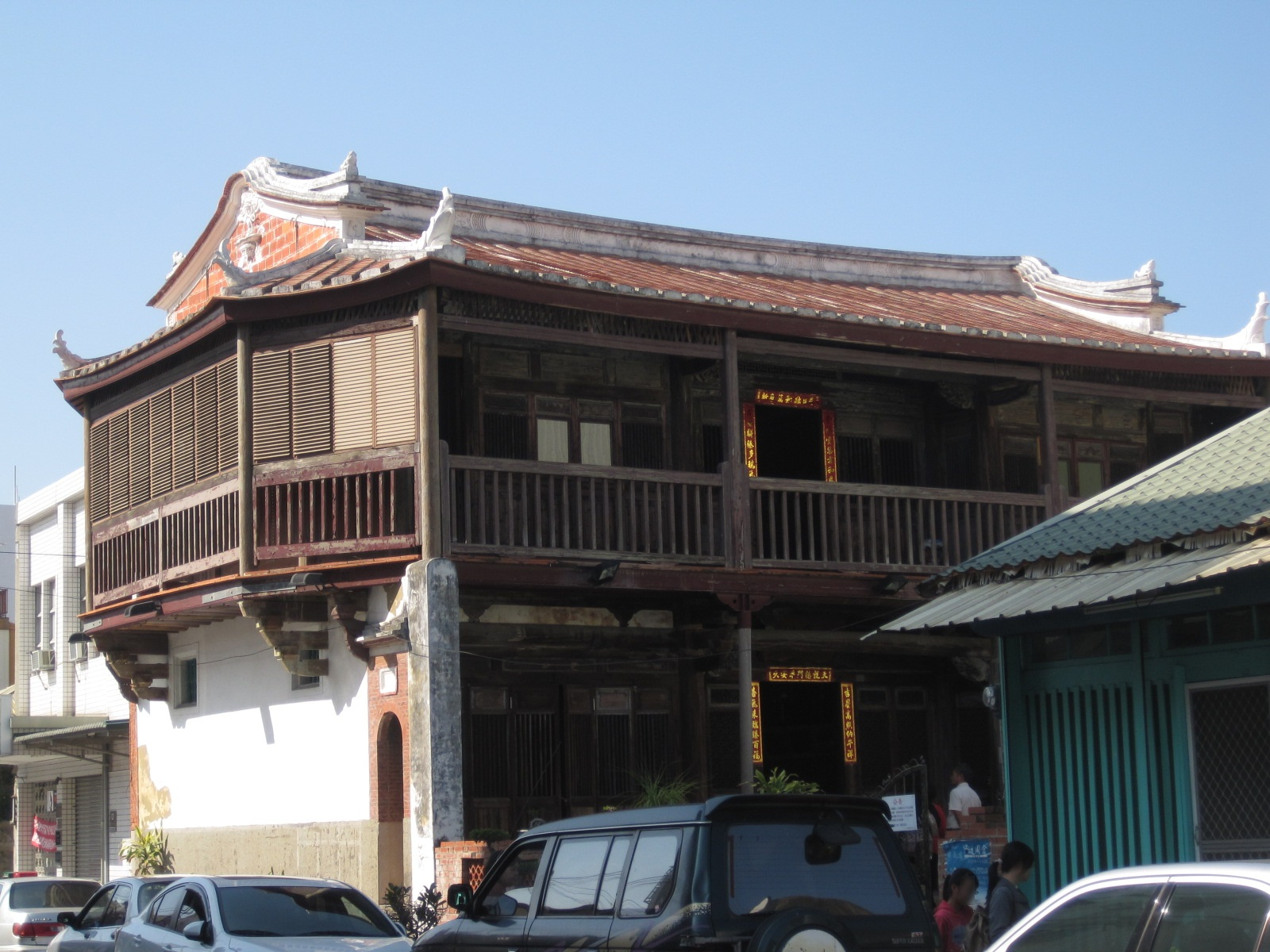
Yanshui Octagonal Building (鹽水八角樓), Tainan City

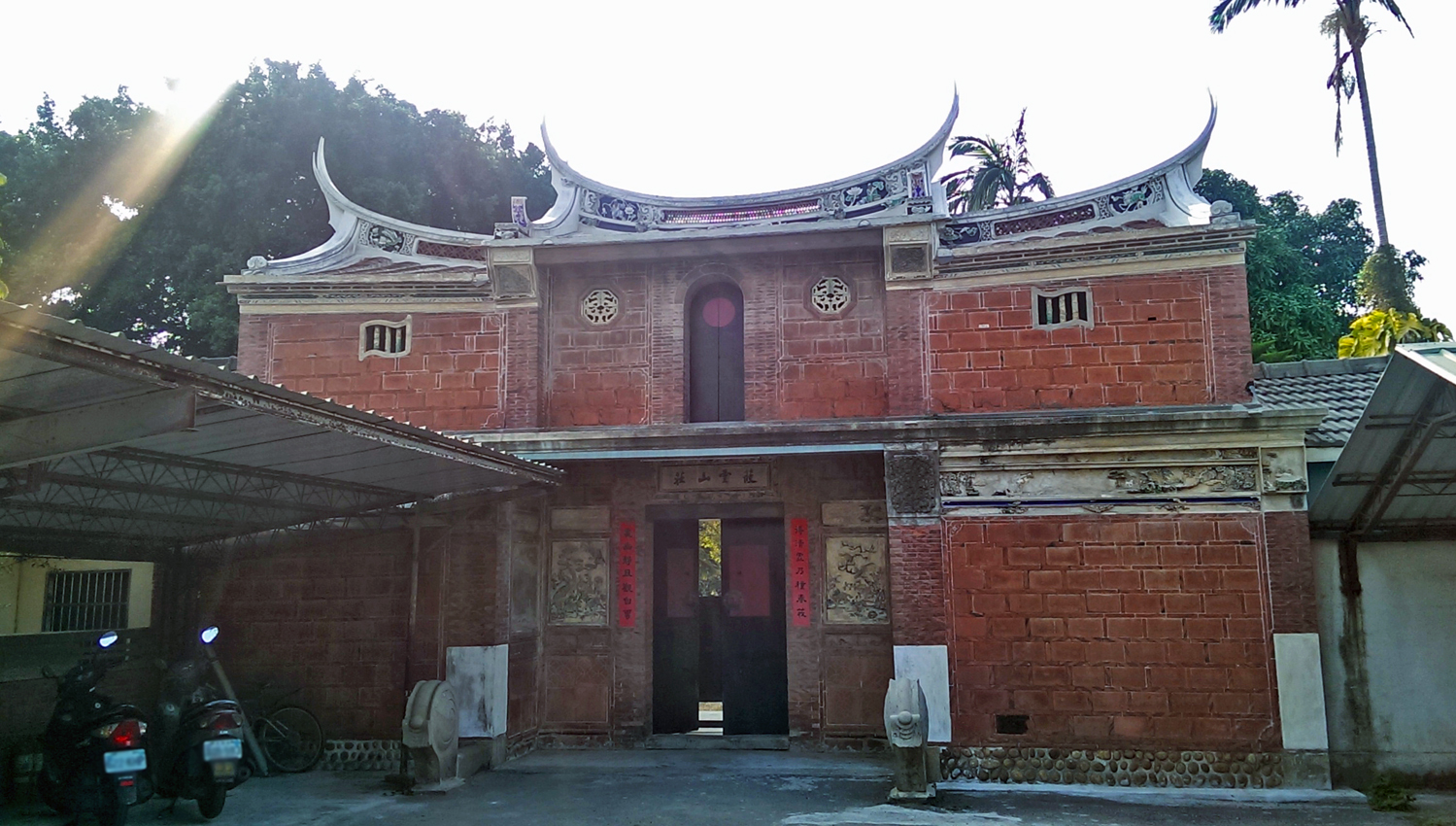
Hsiau-Yun Villa (筱雲山莊), Taichung City

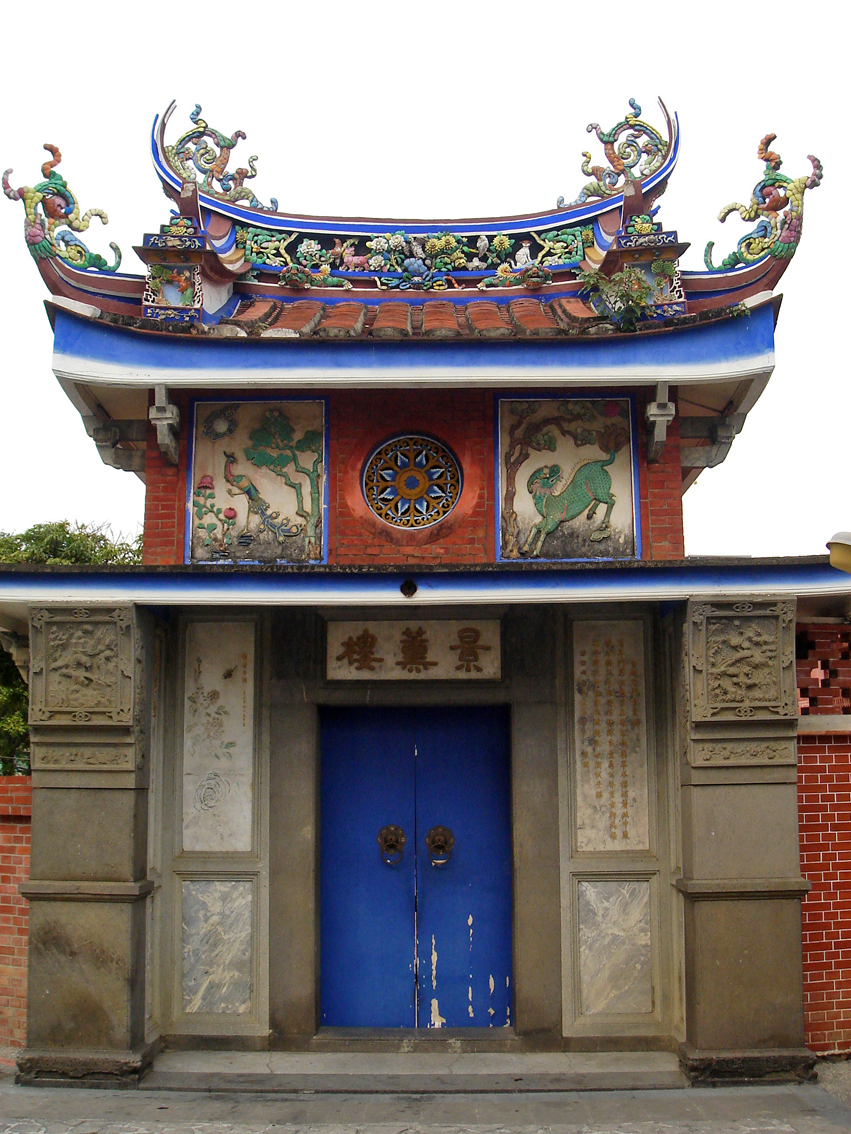
Tower of Prospective Fragrance (景薰樓) of Wufeng Lin Family Mansion and Garden, Taichung City (1864)

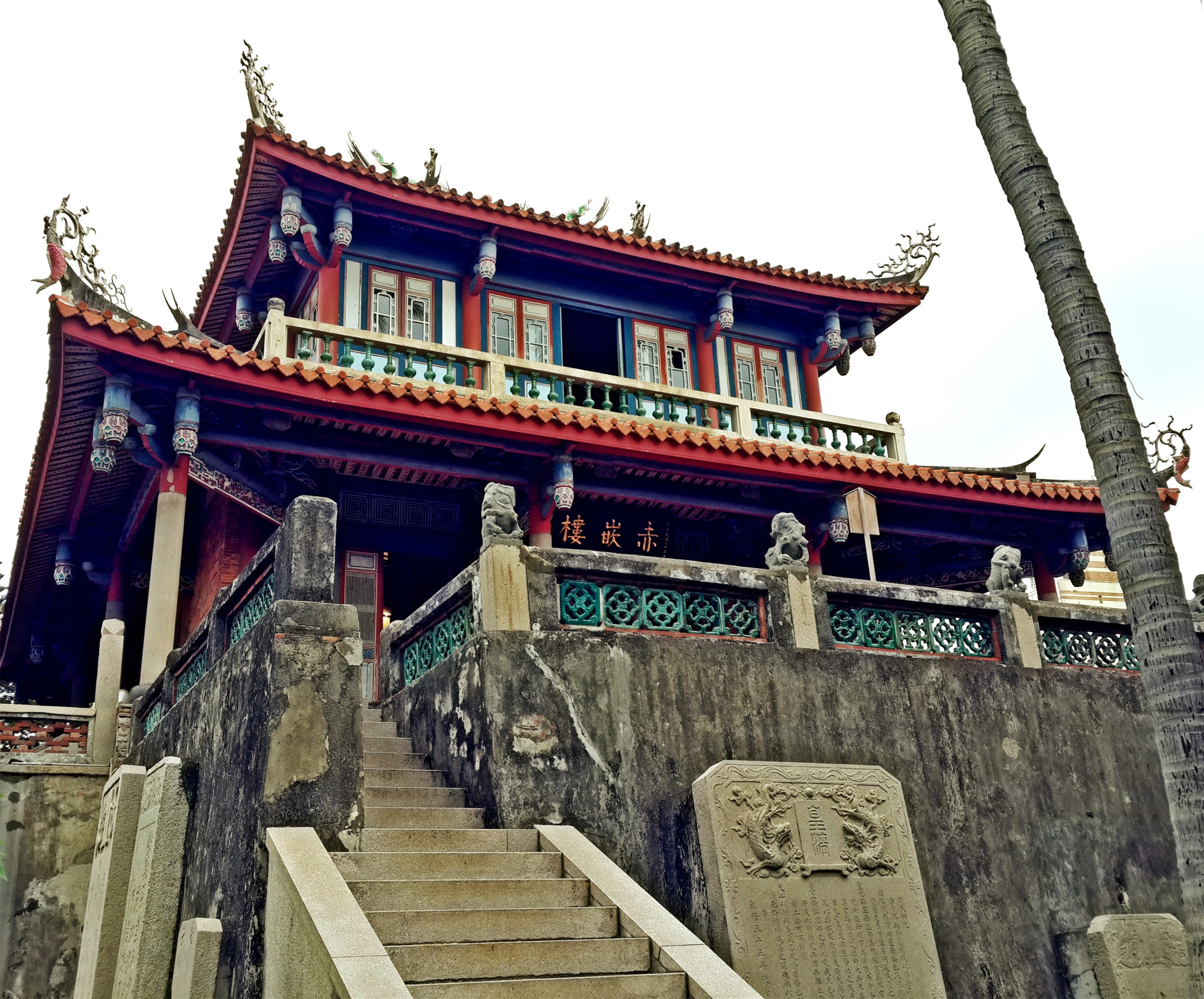
Haisheng Temple (海神廟) of Chihkan Tower, Tainan

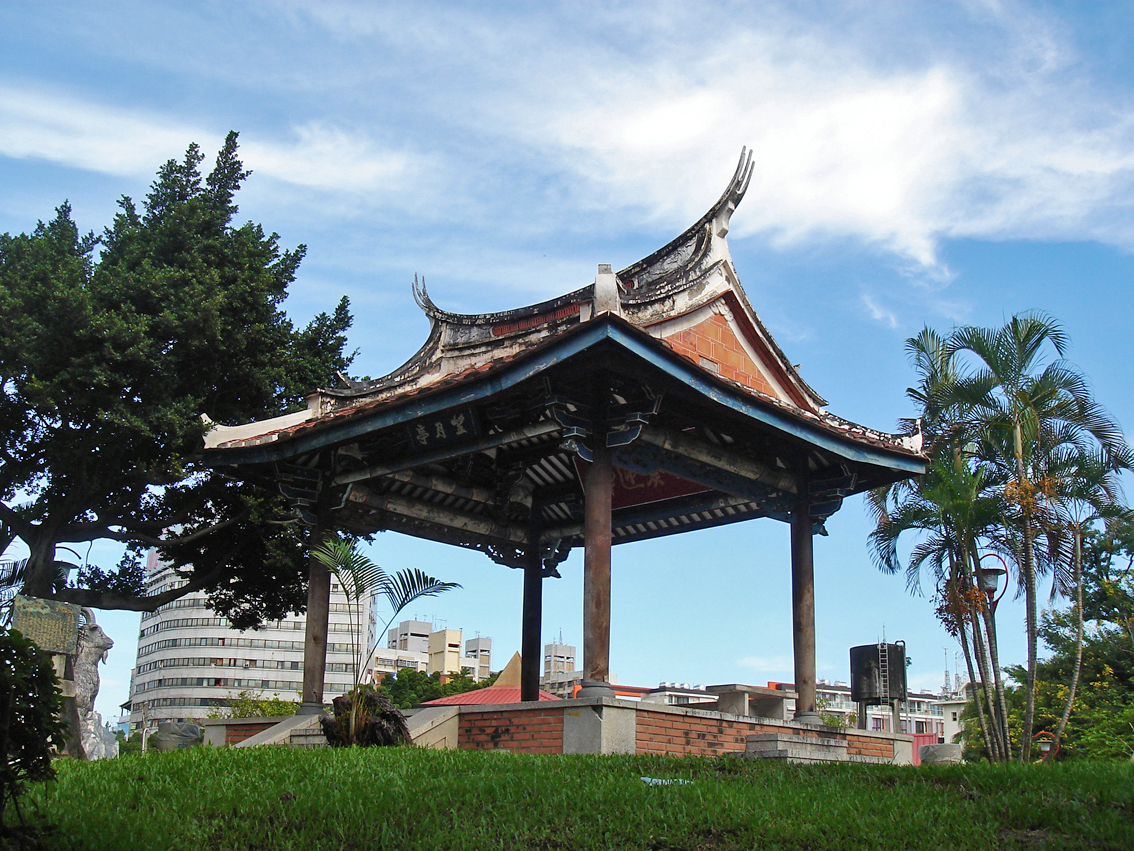
North Gate of Taiwan Provincial Capital (臺灣省城), present day Watching Moon Pavilion (望月亭) in Taichung Park, Taichung City

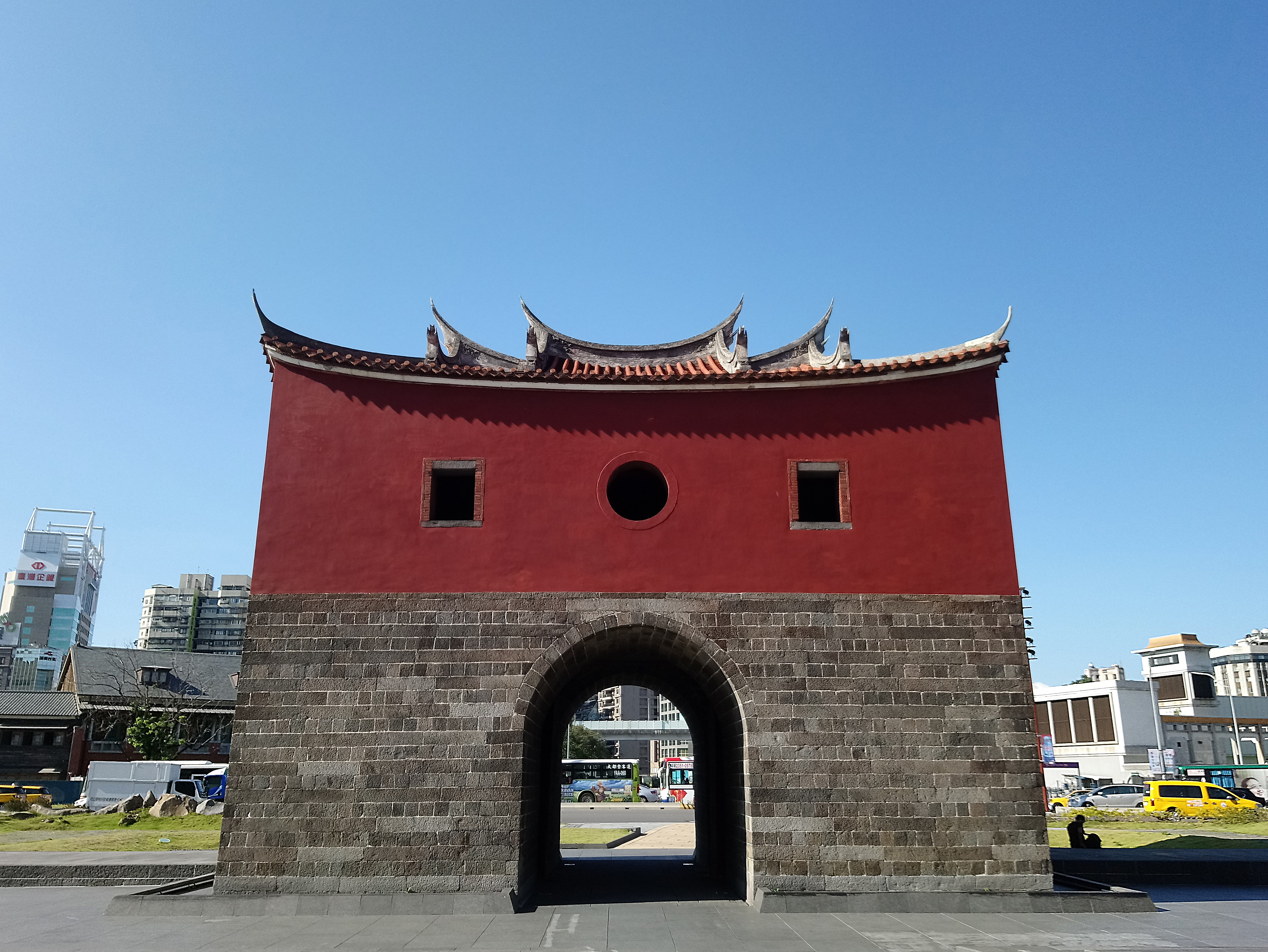
North Gate of the Walls of Taipei in Taipei City, also called Cheng'enmen (承恩門, Taiwanese: Sêng-un-mn̂g, Hakka: Siin11-en24 mun11)

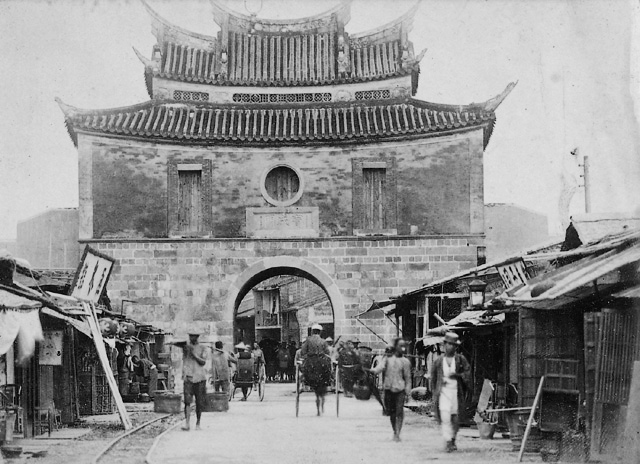
West Gate of the Walls of Taipei in Taipei City, also called Baochengmen (寶成門)

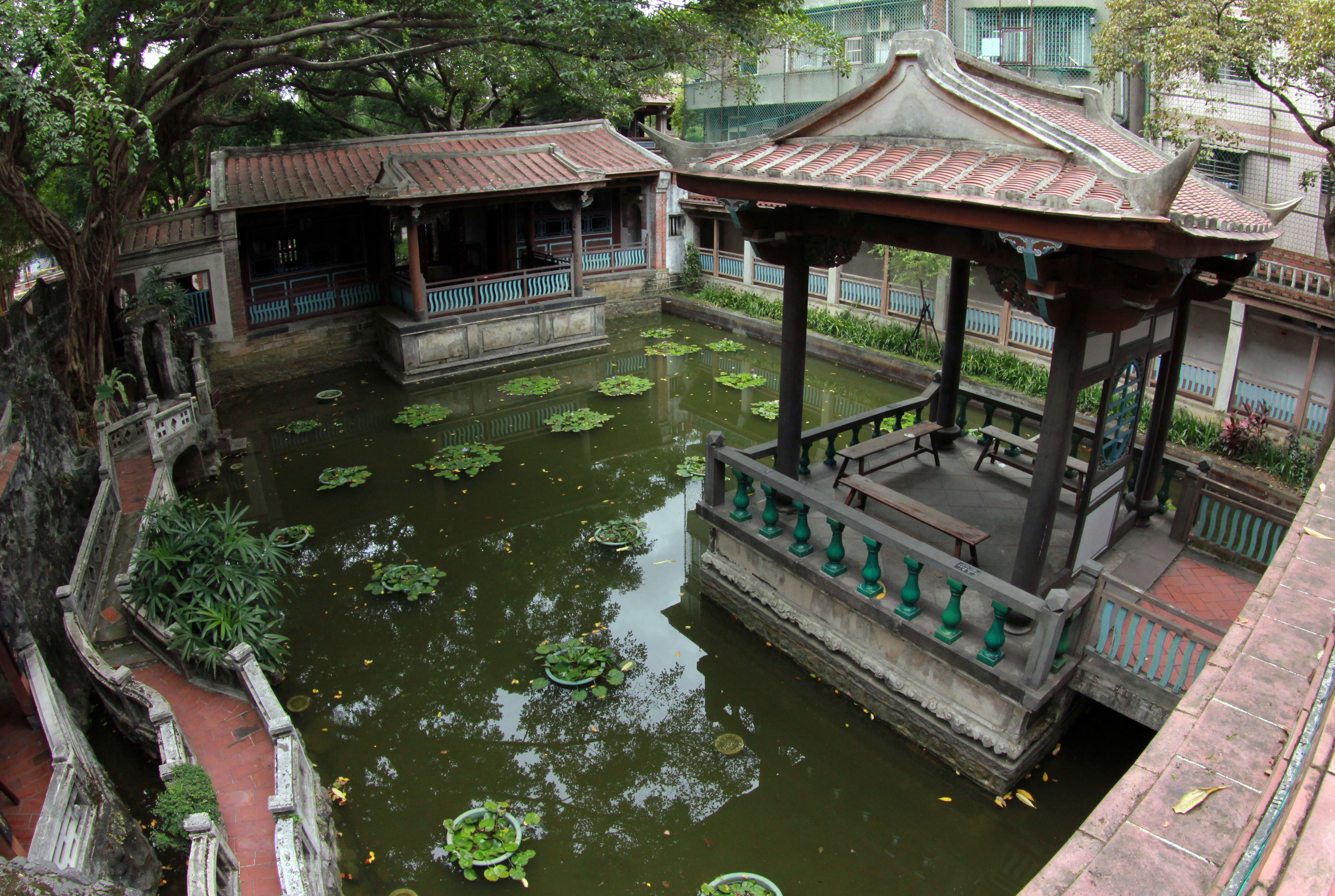
Lin Family Mansion and Garden, New Taipei City

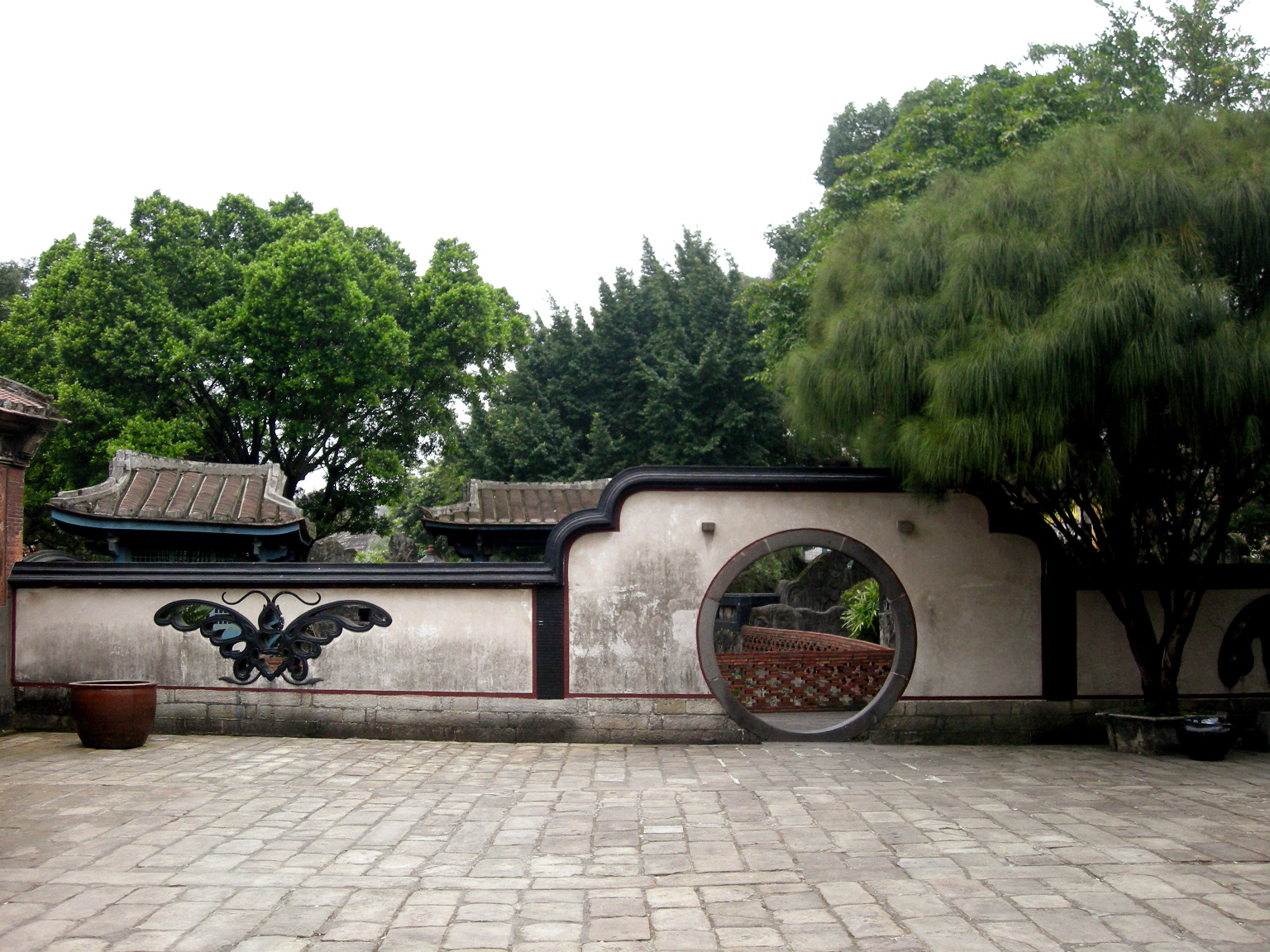
Lin Family Mansion and Garden, New Taipei City

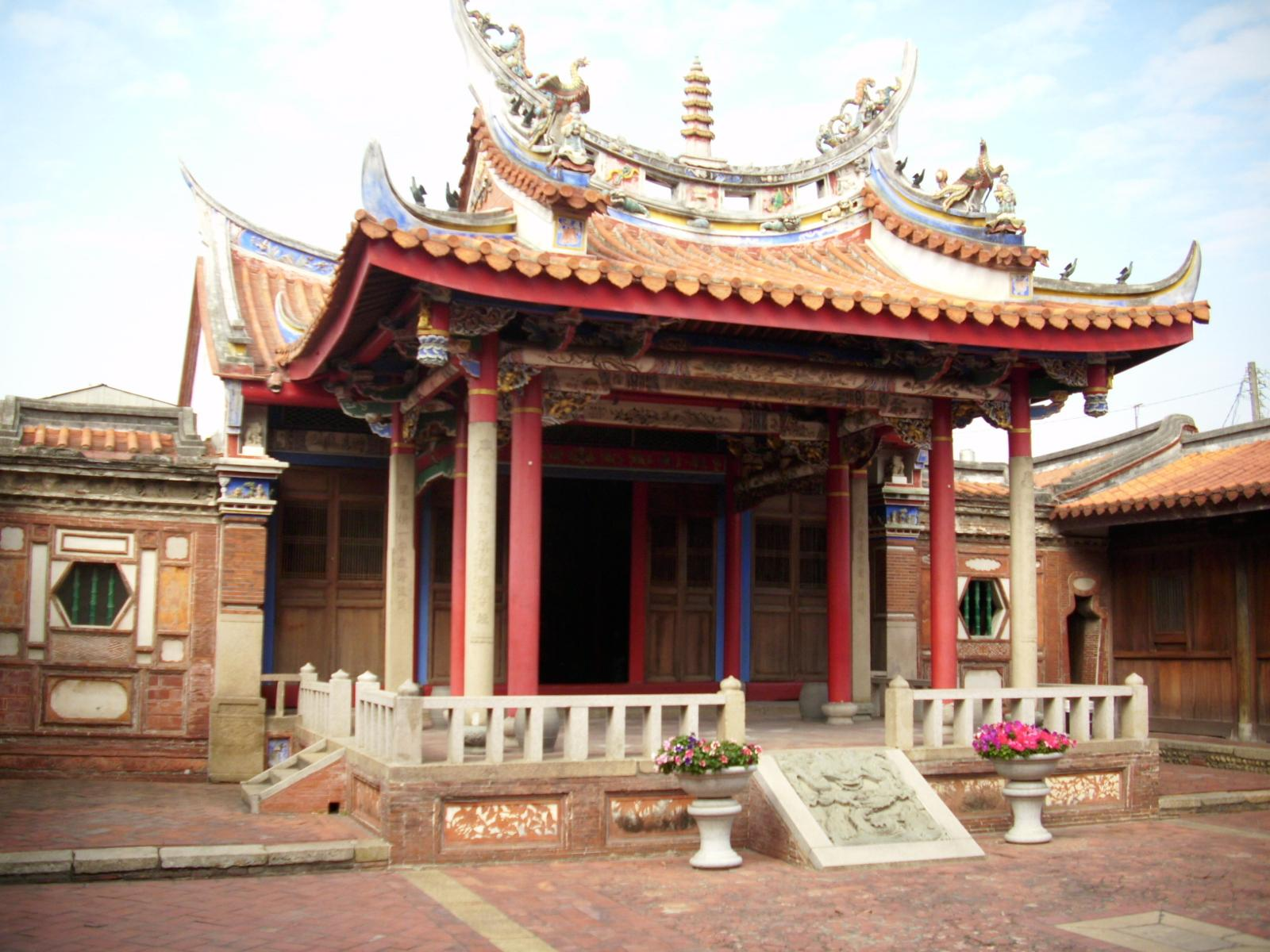
Huangxi Academy, Taichung City

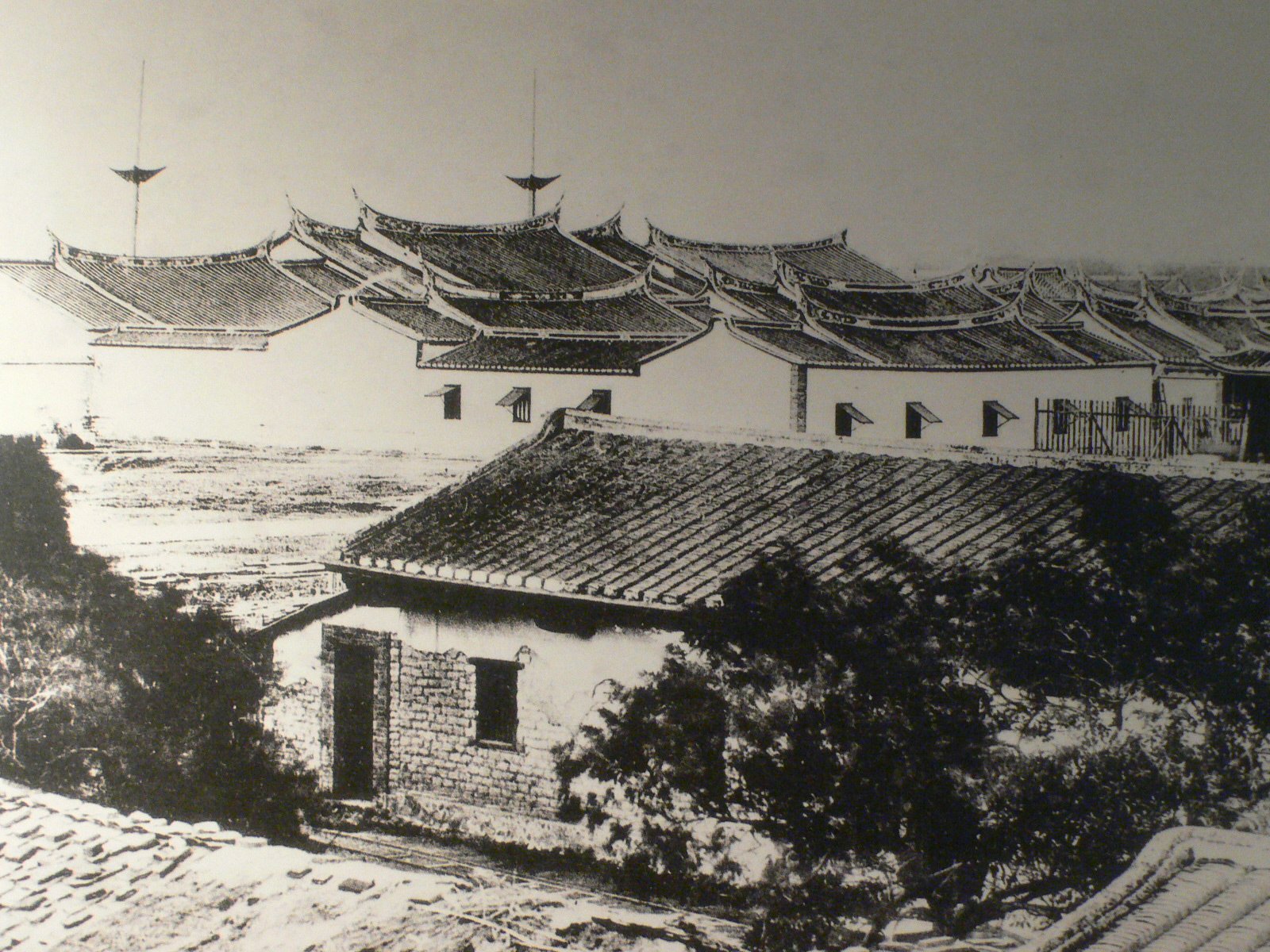
The Guest House of Imperial Envoys(欽差行臺), Taipei City

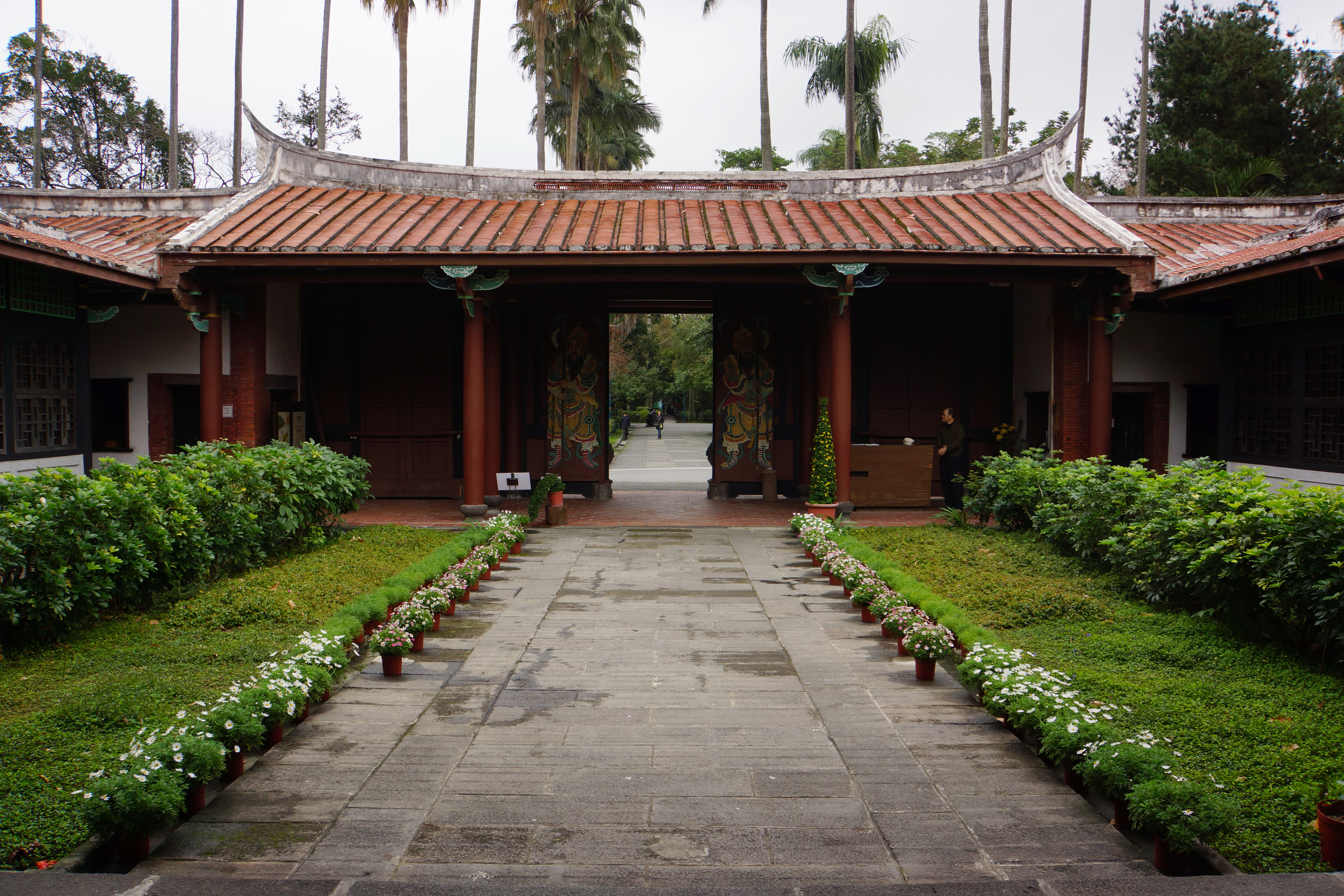
The Guest House of Imperial Envoys(欽差行臺), Taipei City

Houses constructed of mud and straw by the Siniticized Ketagalan tribe of Kanatsui settlement (圭武卒社), Taipei City

Hakka Architecture

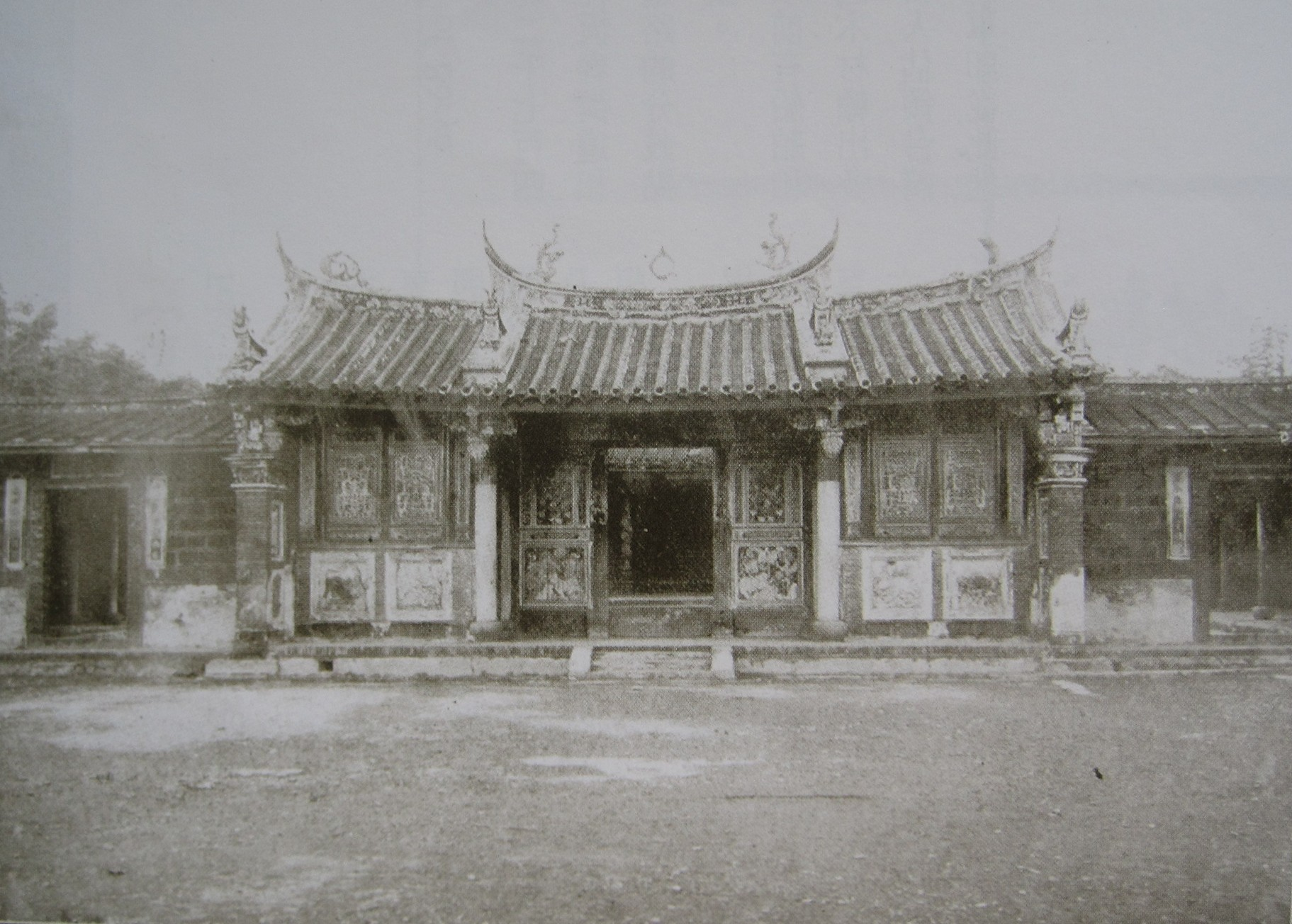
Liudui Martyr's Shrine (六堆忠義祠), Pingtung County

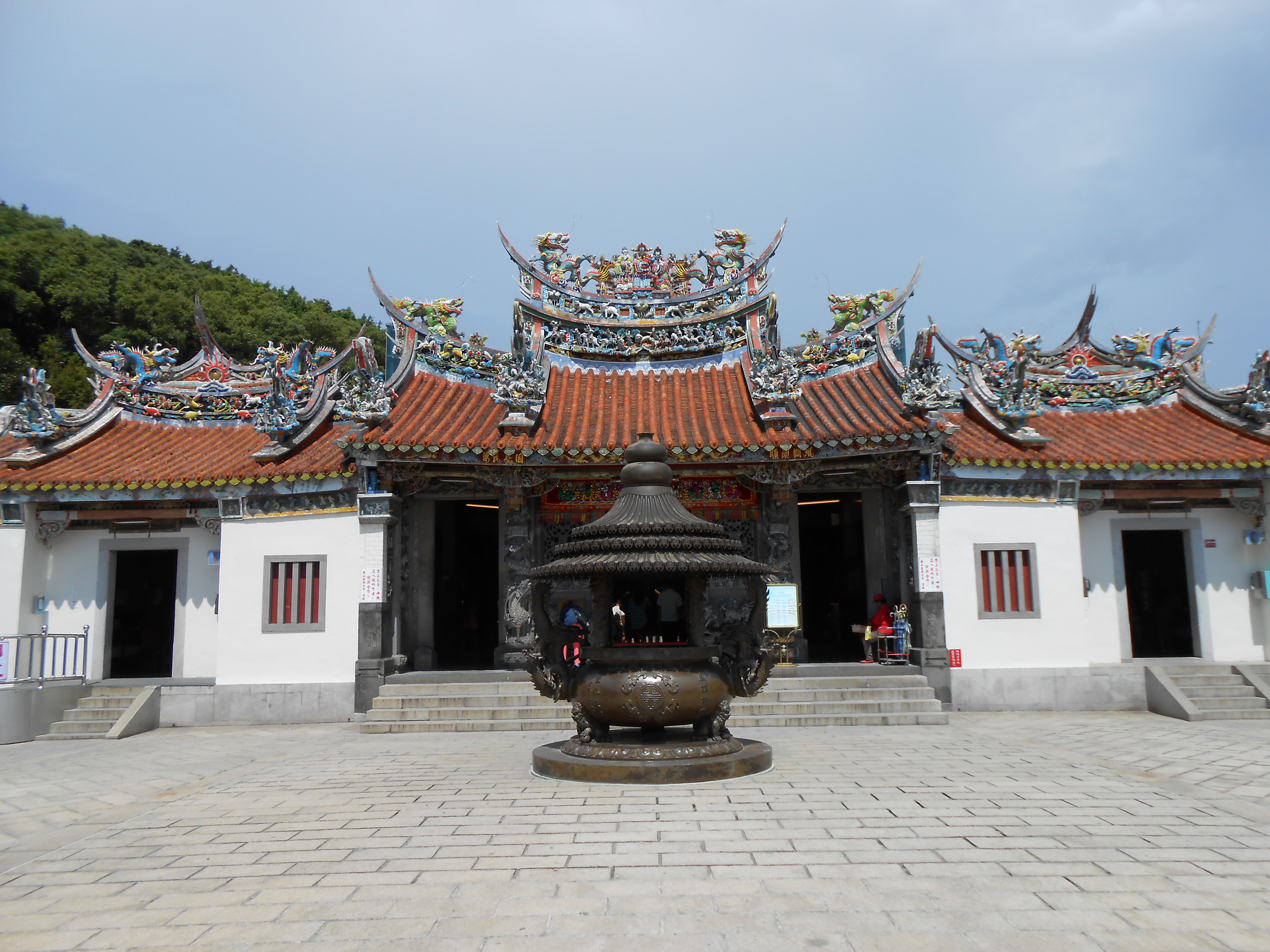
Shoushanyan Guanyin Temple (壽山巖觀音寺), Taoyuan City

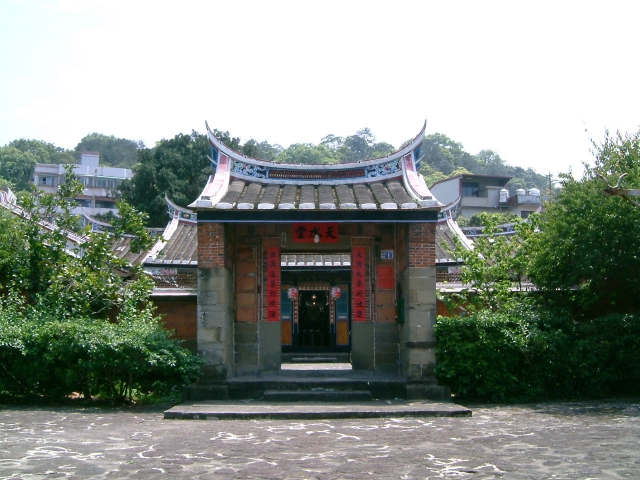
Beipu Tianshui Temple (北埔天水堂), Hsinchu County

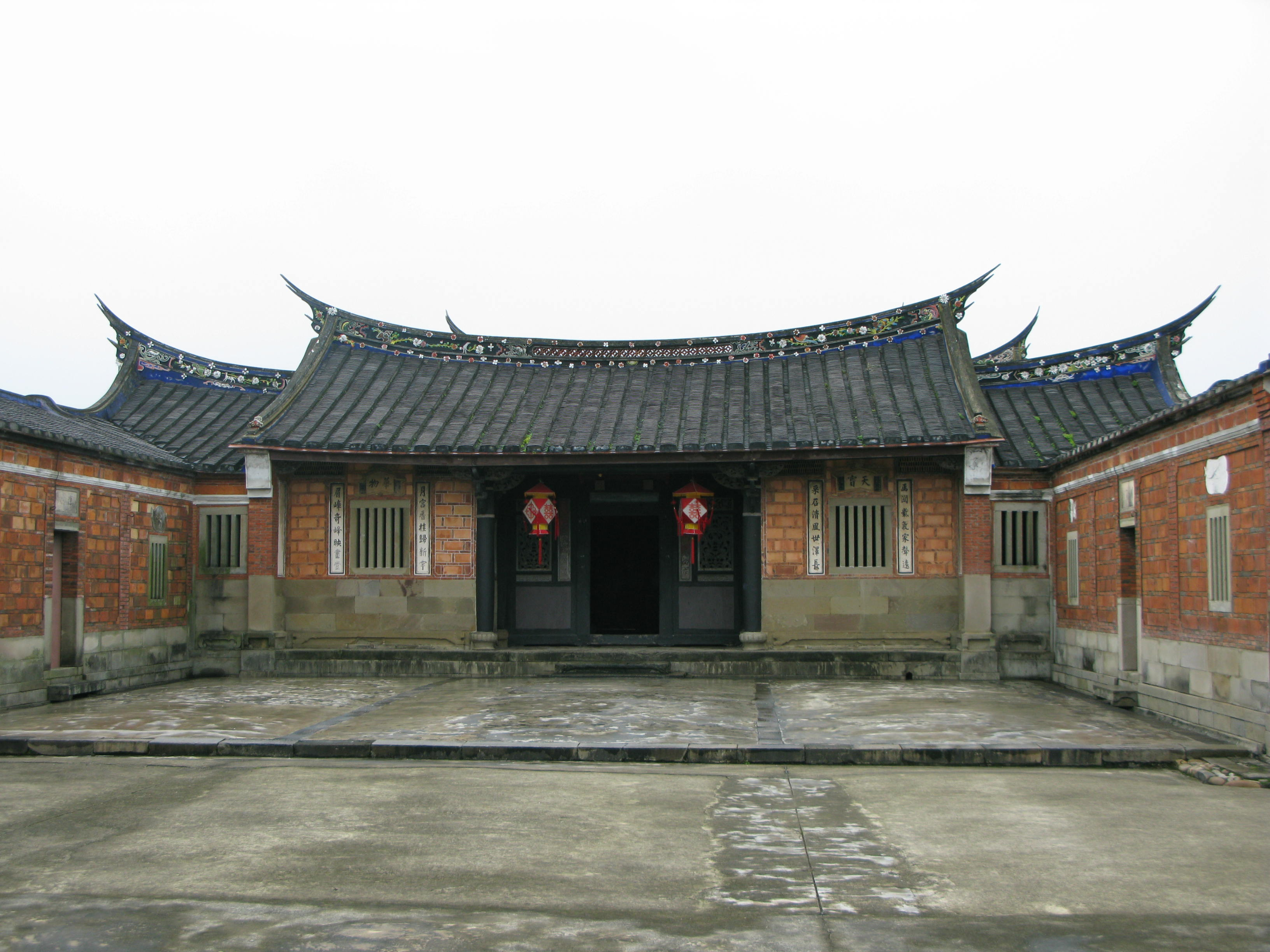
Lee Teng-fan's Ancient Residence, Taoyuan City

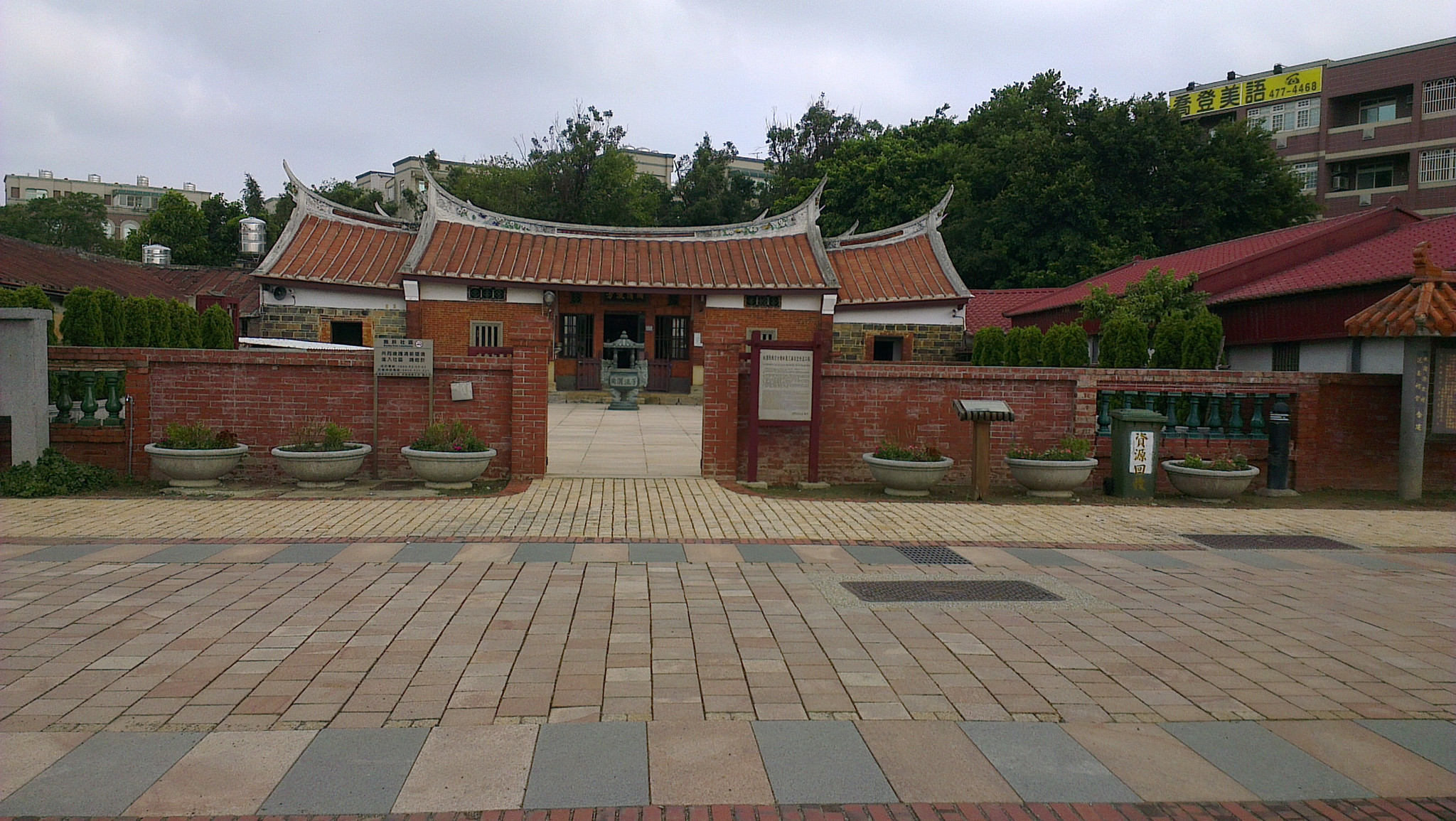
Fanjiang Ancestral Hall (新屋范姜祖堂), Taoyuan City

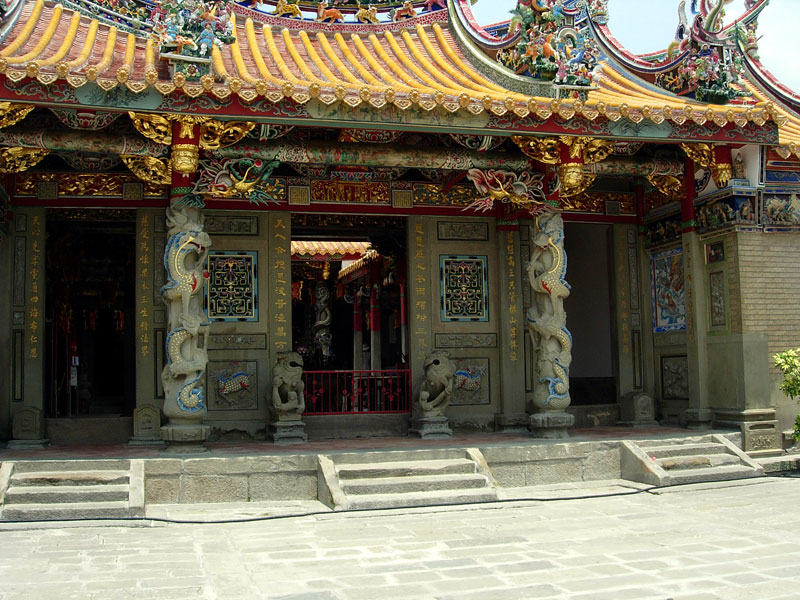
Beipu Citian Temple, Hsinchu County

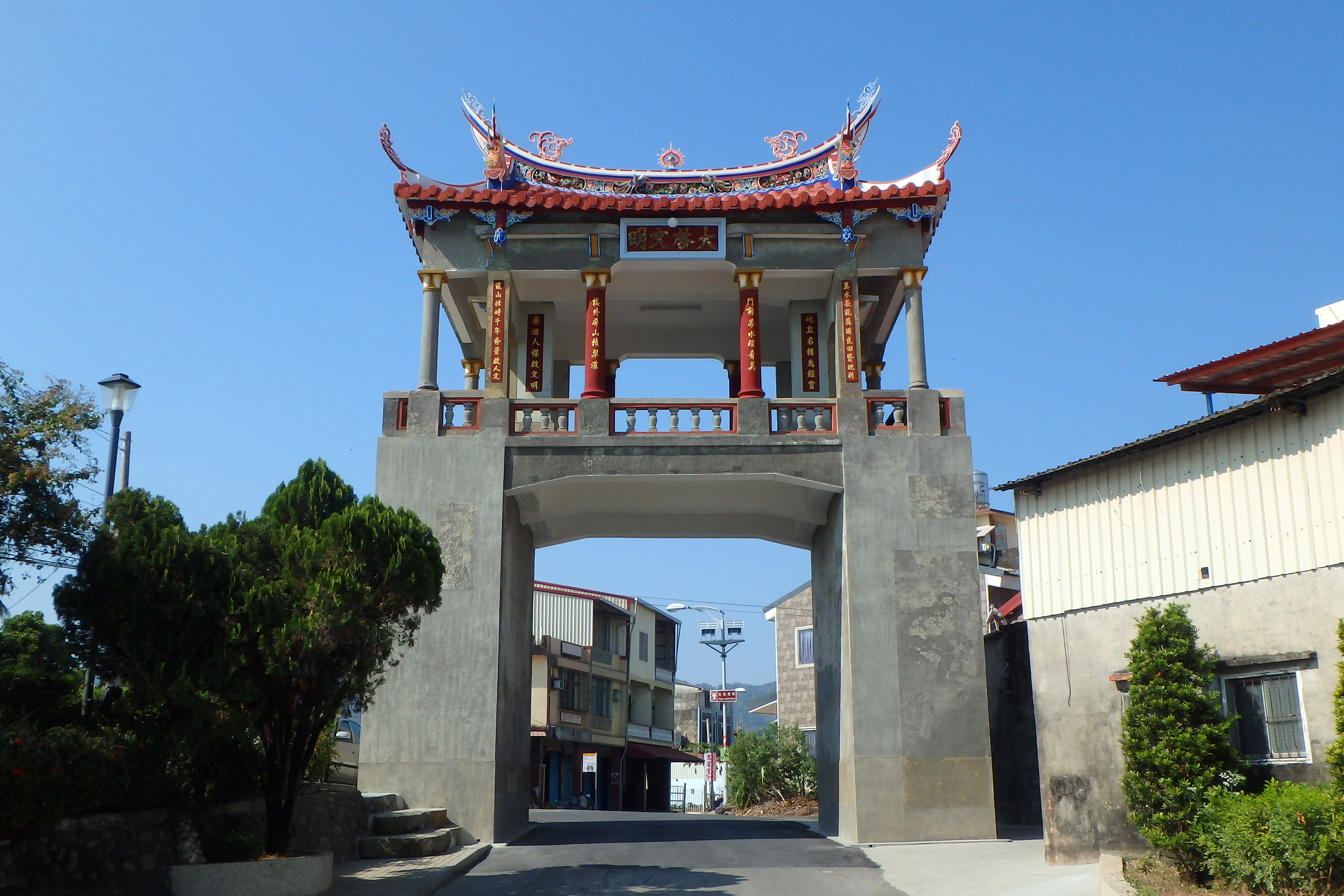
Meinong East Gate Tower, Kaohsiung City, rebuilt in 1937.

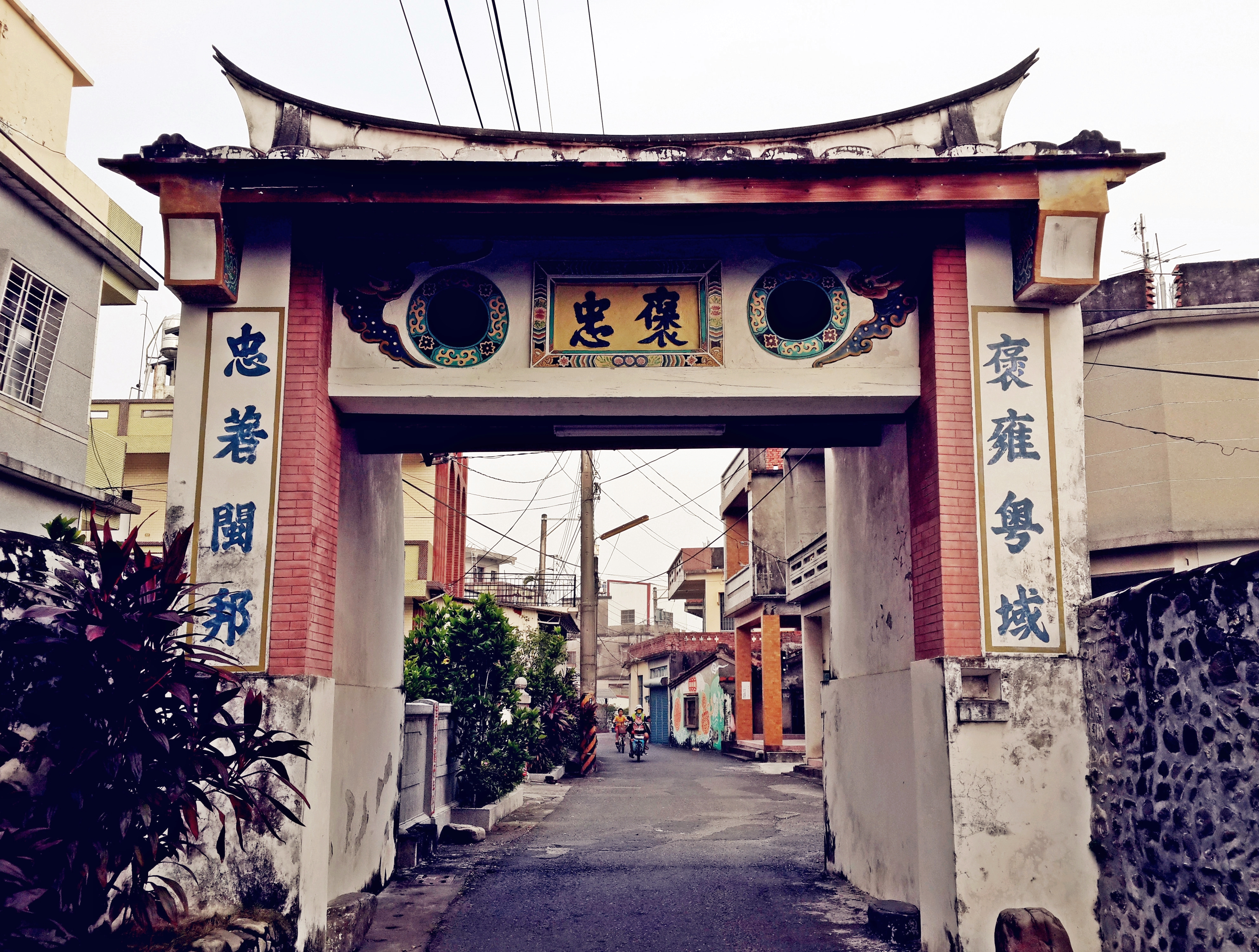
West Fence Gate(西柵門) of Jiadong (佳冬), Pingtung County

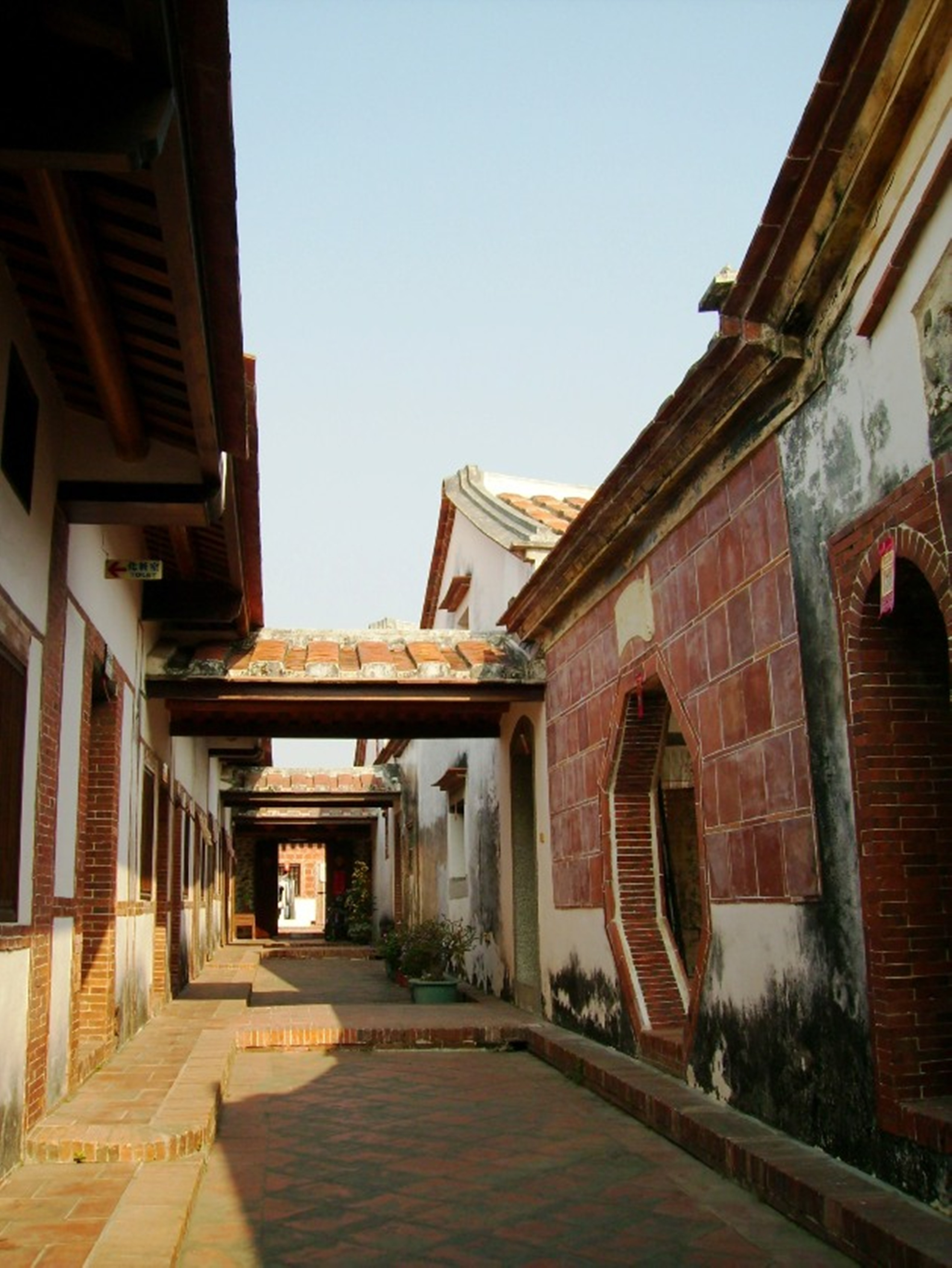
Old House of Siiao Family(蕭家祖屋), Pingtung County

Fuzhou-style (Mindong) Architecture

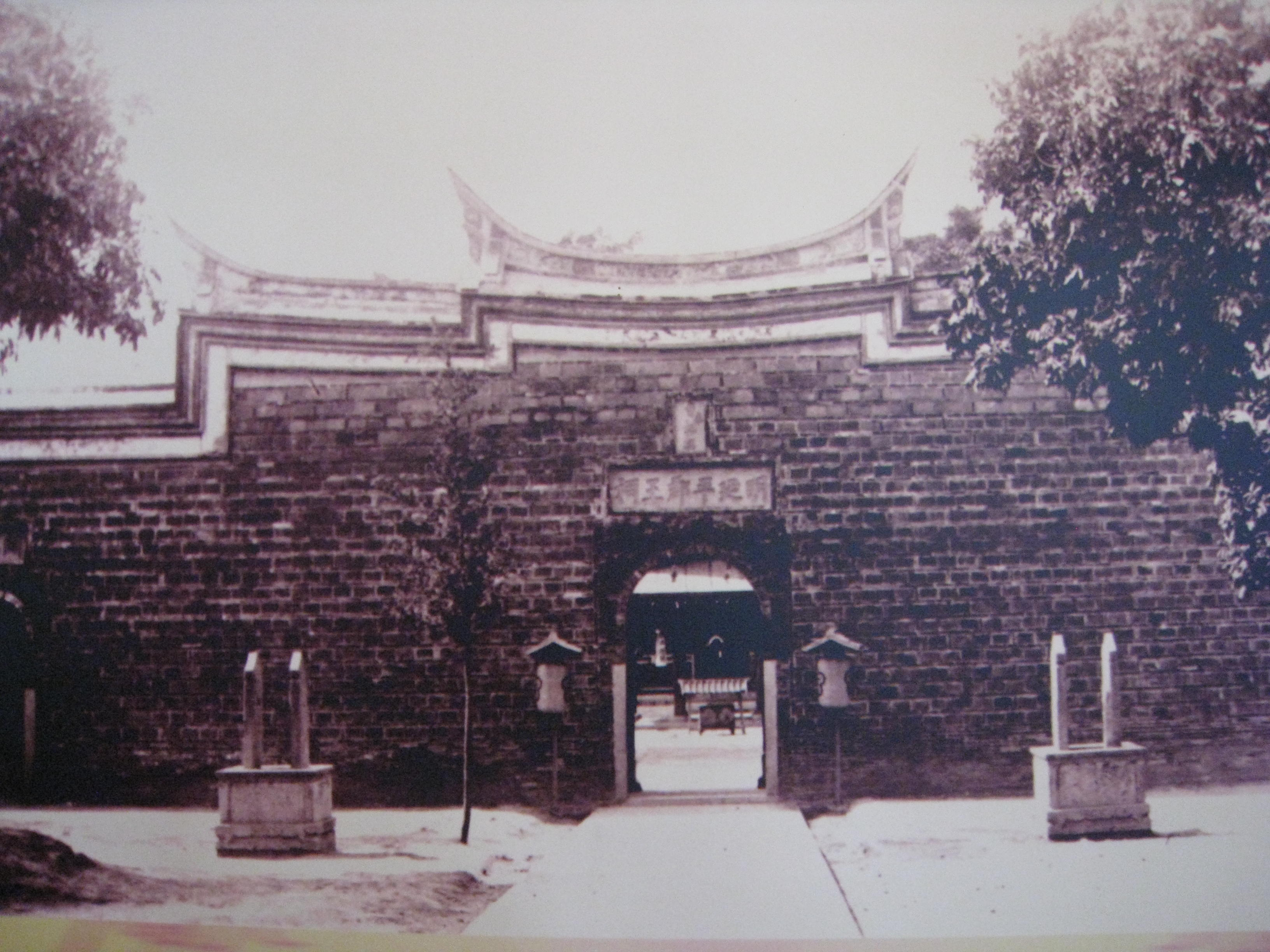
Koxinga Shrine (延平郡王祠), Tainan City

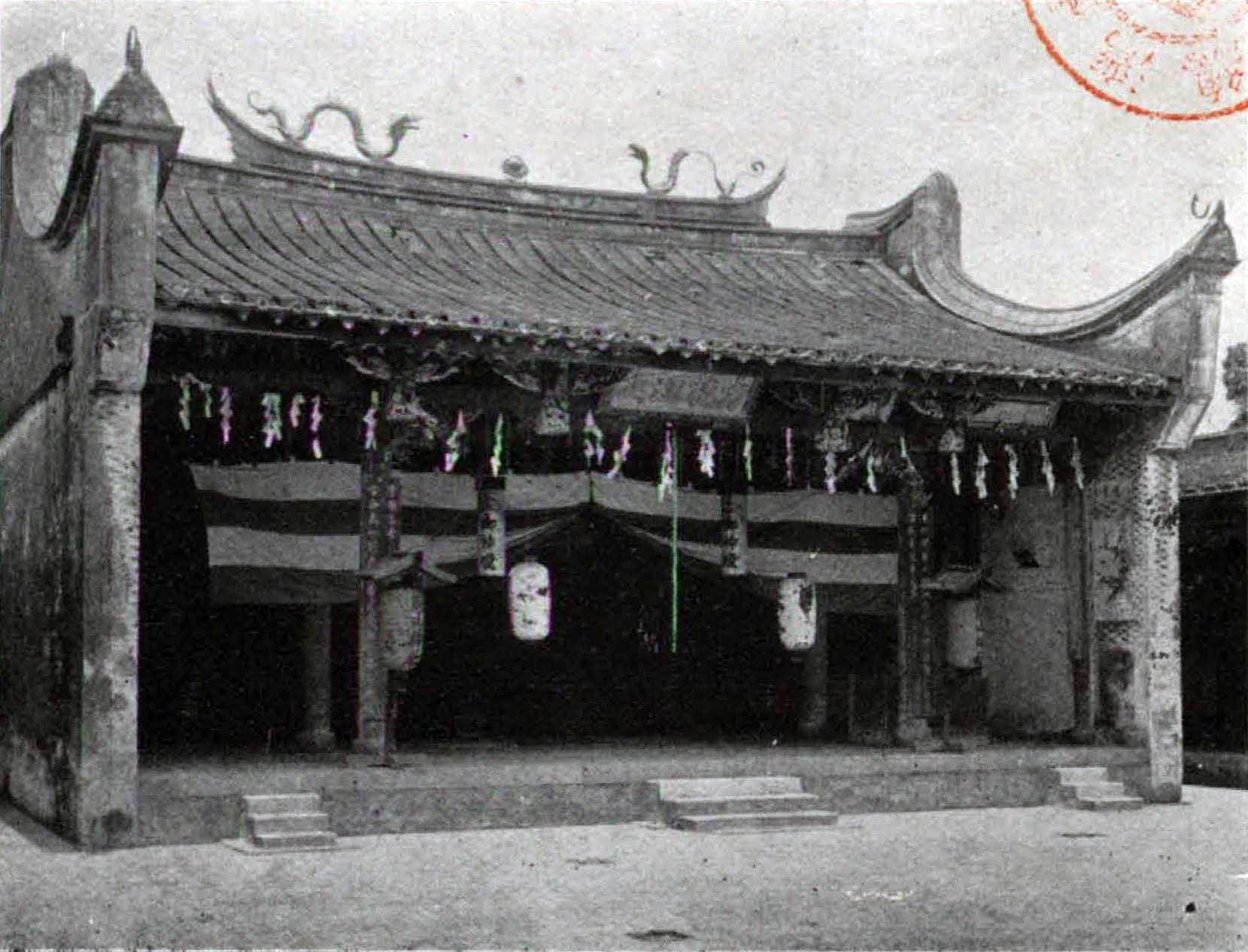
Koxinga Shrine (延平郡王祠), Tainan City

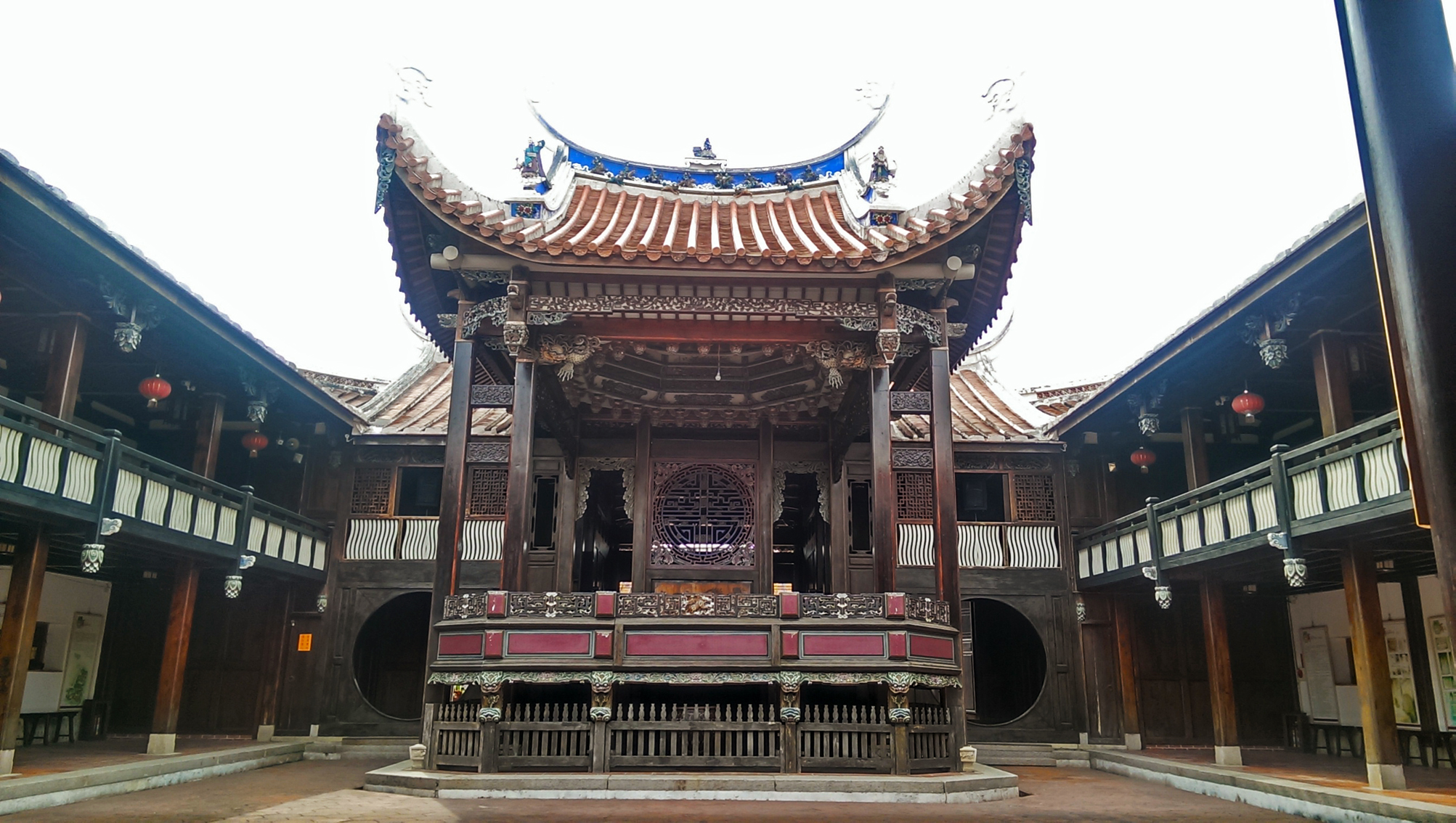
Great Flower Hall (大花廳) in Wufeng Lin Family Mansion and Garden, Taichung City

Teochew-style architecture

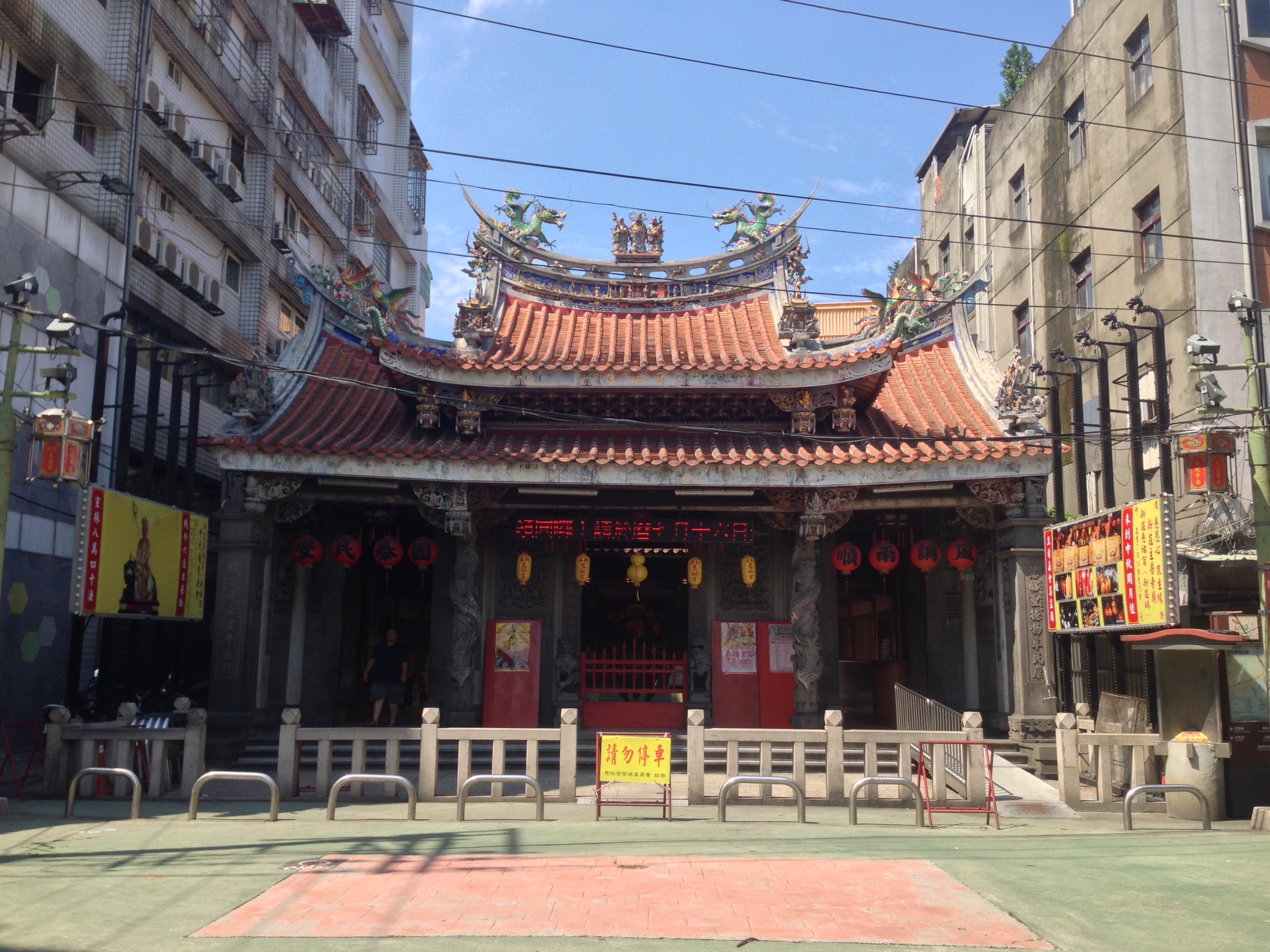
Xinzhuang Ciyou Palace (新莊慈祐宮, Taiwanese: Sin-chng Chû-iū-kiong), New Taipei City

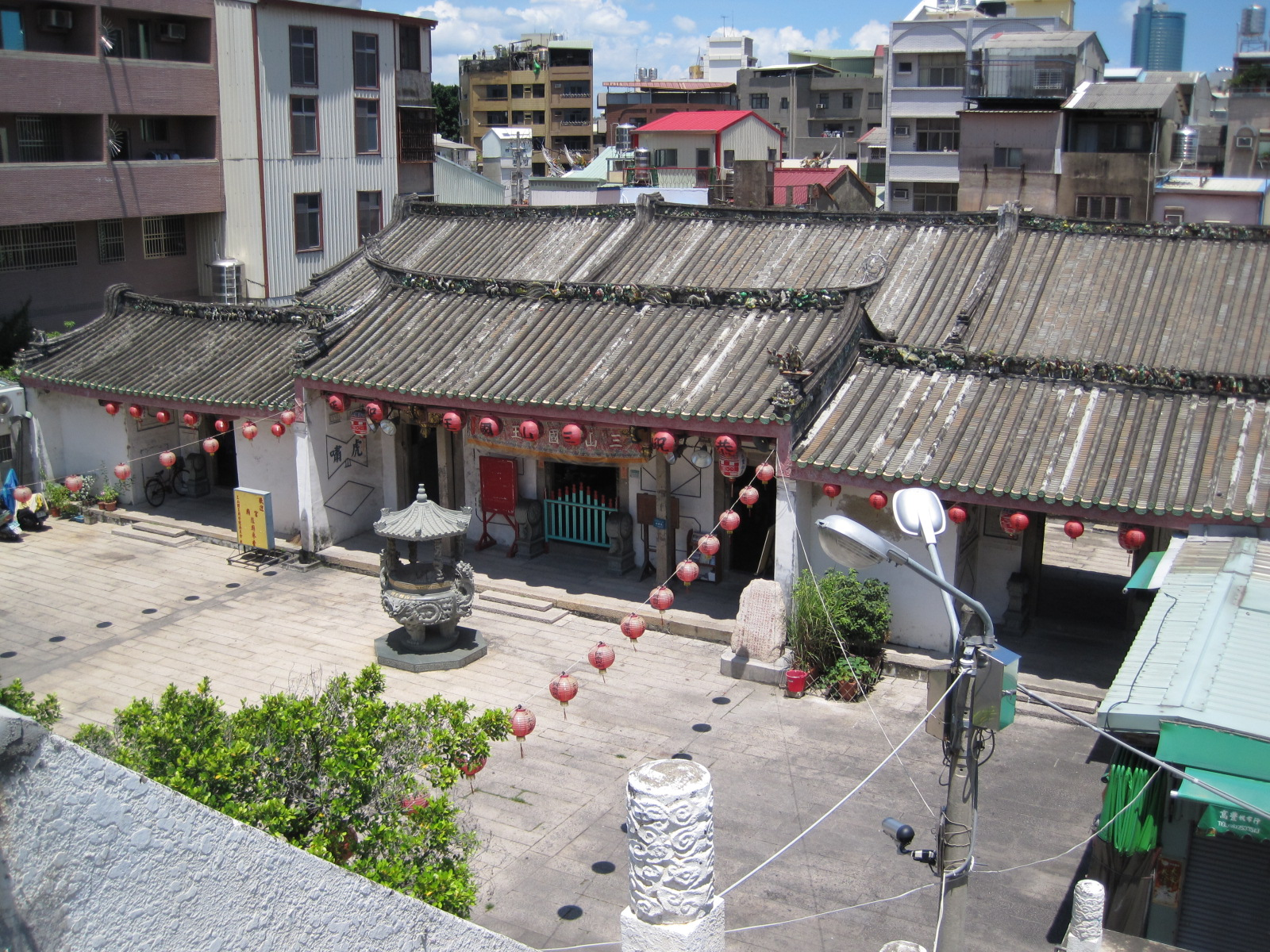
Three Mountain Kings Temple (三山國王廟), Tainan City

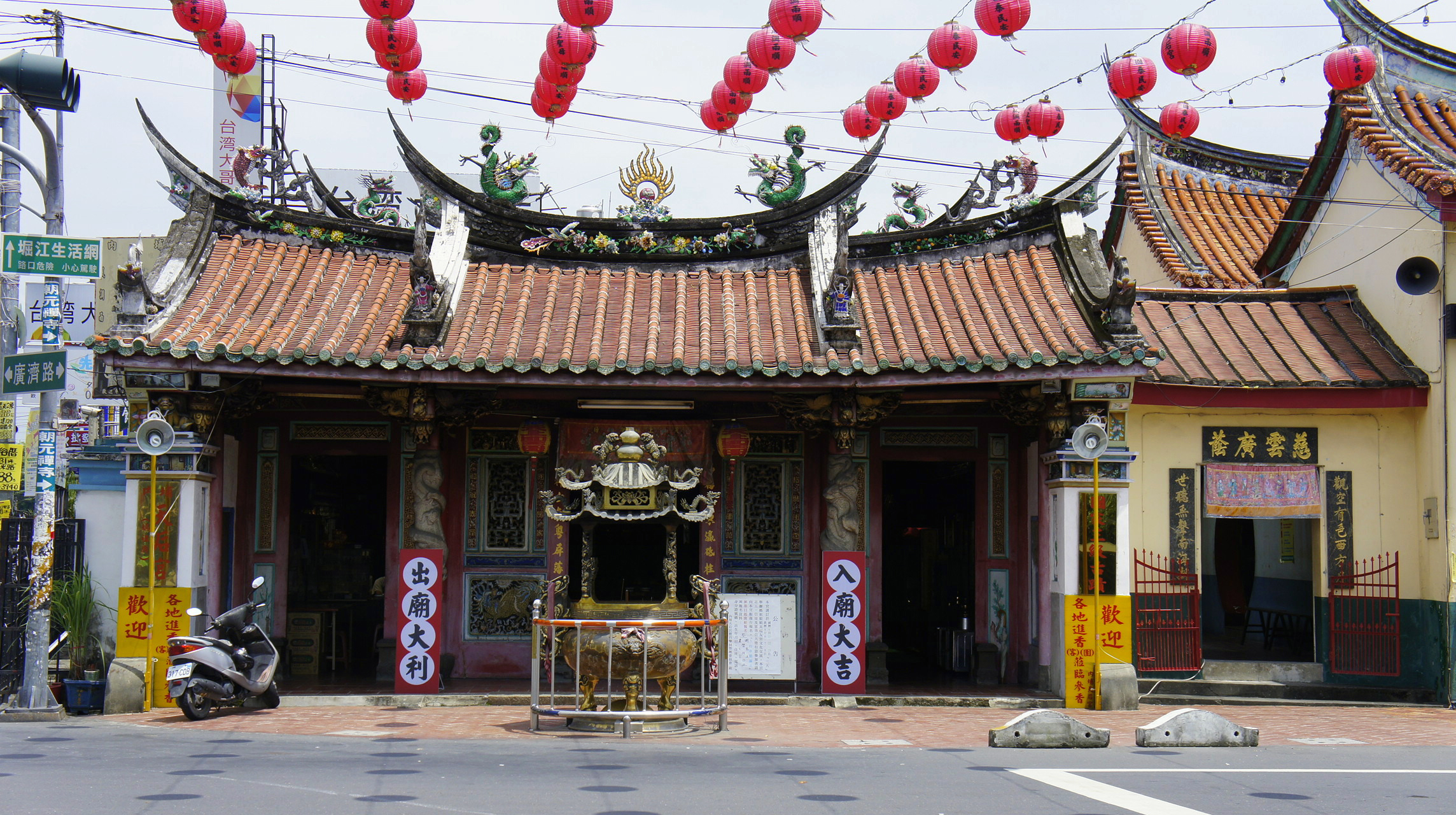
Liudui Tianhou Temple (六堆天后宮, Hakka:Liuk-tôi Thiên-heu-kiûng), Pingtung County

Lingnan-style architecture

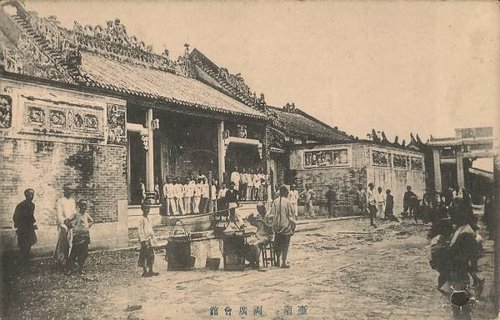
Liangguanghui Hall (兩廣會館), Tainan City

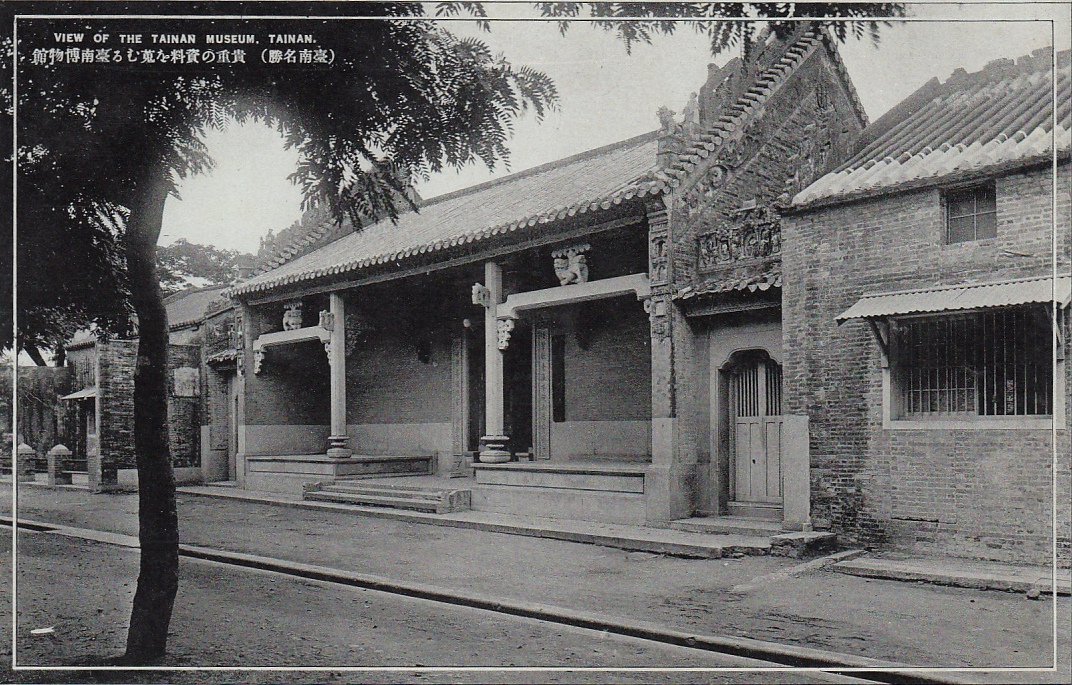
Liangguanghui Hall (兩廣會館), Tainan City

Western-style architecture

Holy Rosary Cathedral, Kaohsiung City (1861)

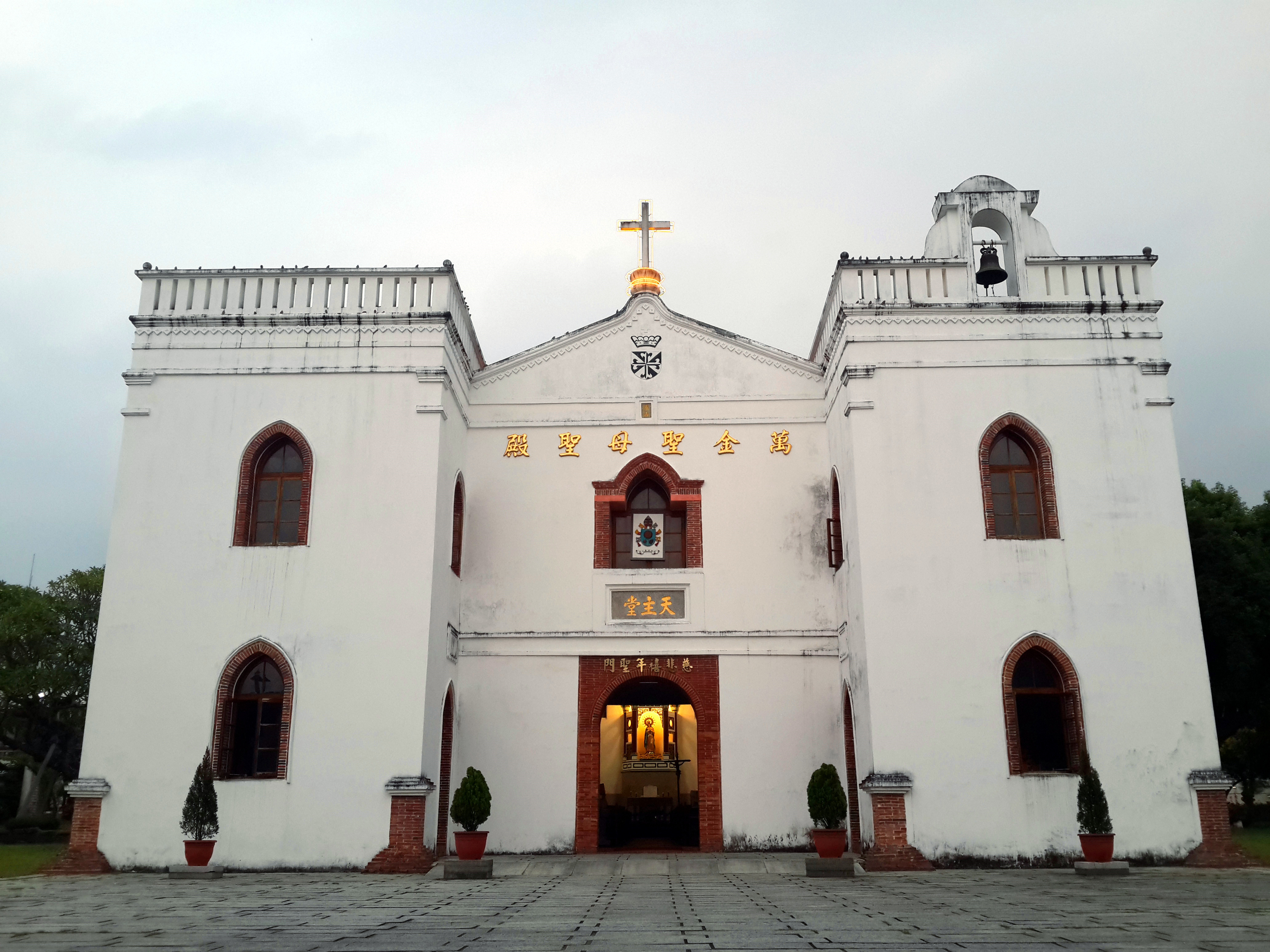
Wanchin Basilica of the Immaculate Conception, Pingtung County (1870)

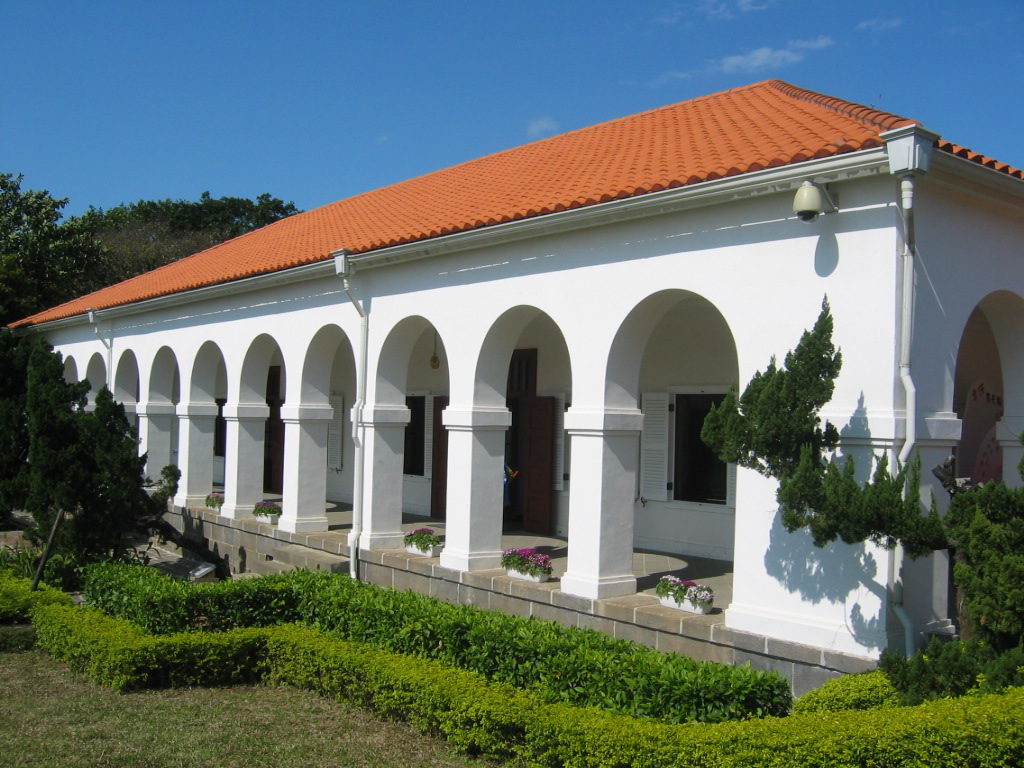
Tamsui Customs Officers' Residence, Tamsui, New Taipei City (1870)

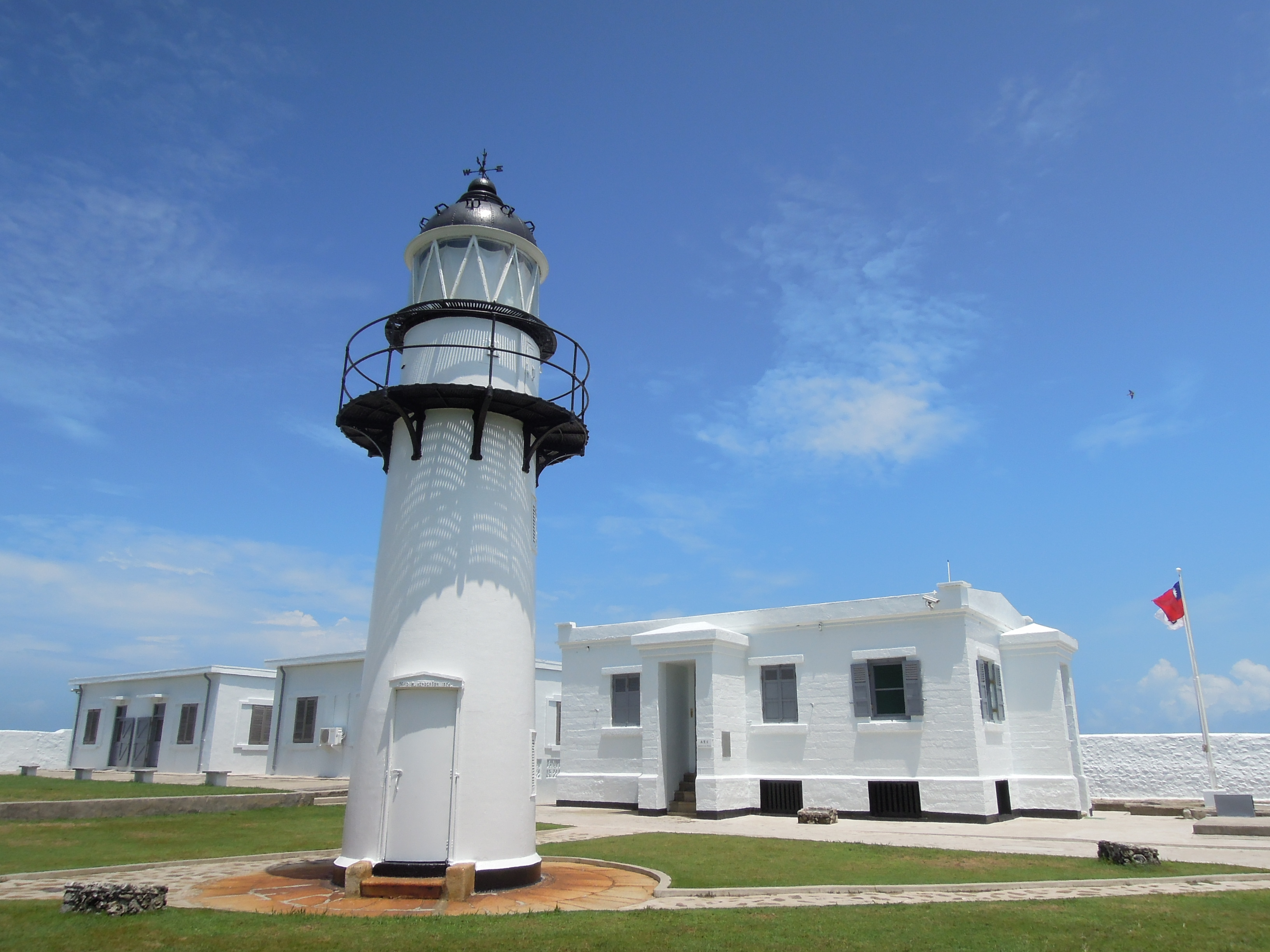
Yuwengdao Lighthouse, Penghu County (1875)

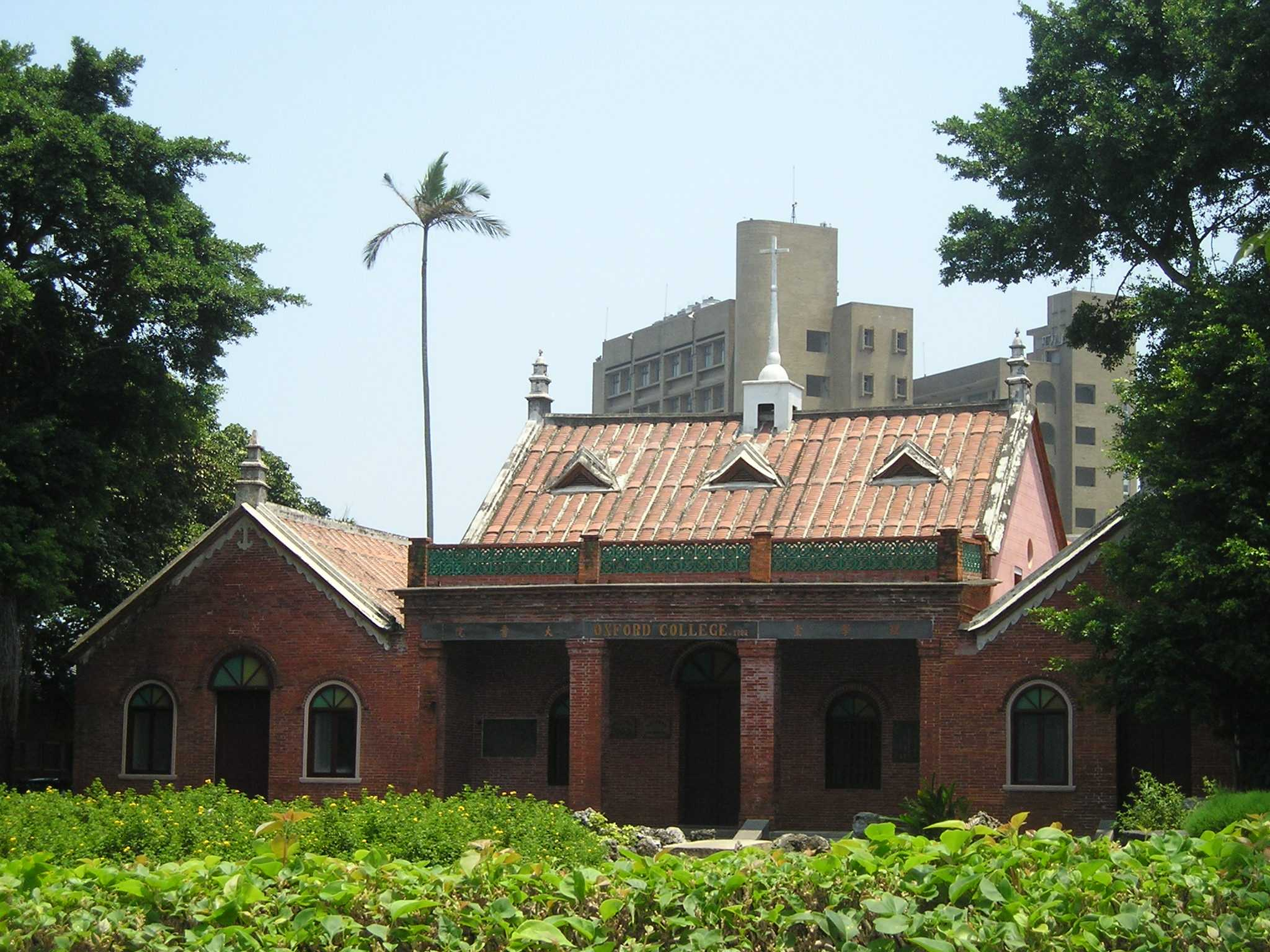
Oxford College, Tamsui, New Taipei City (1882)

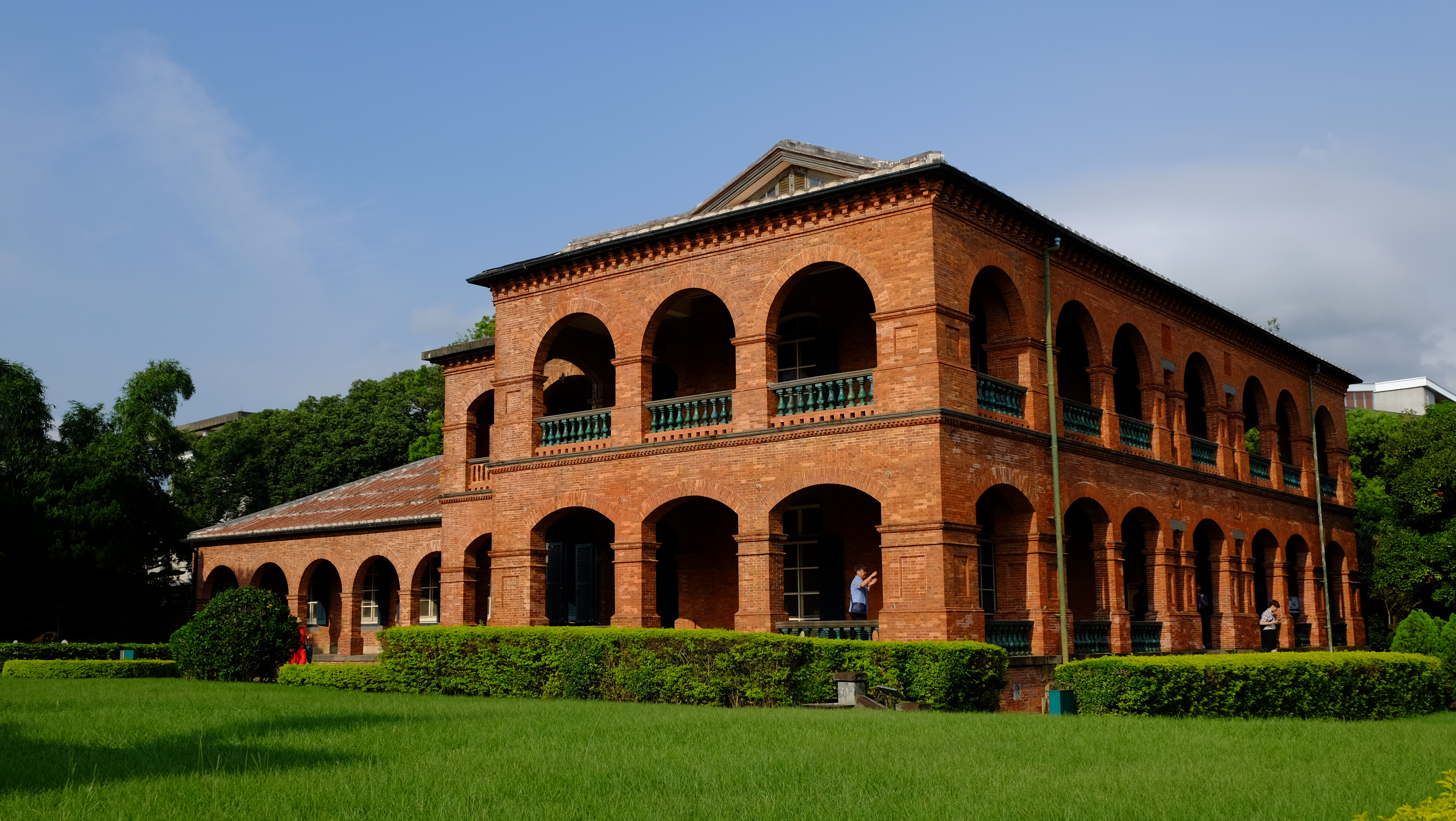
Former British consular residence, Tamsui, New Taipei City (1891)

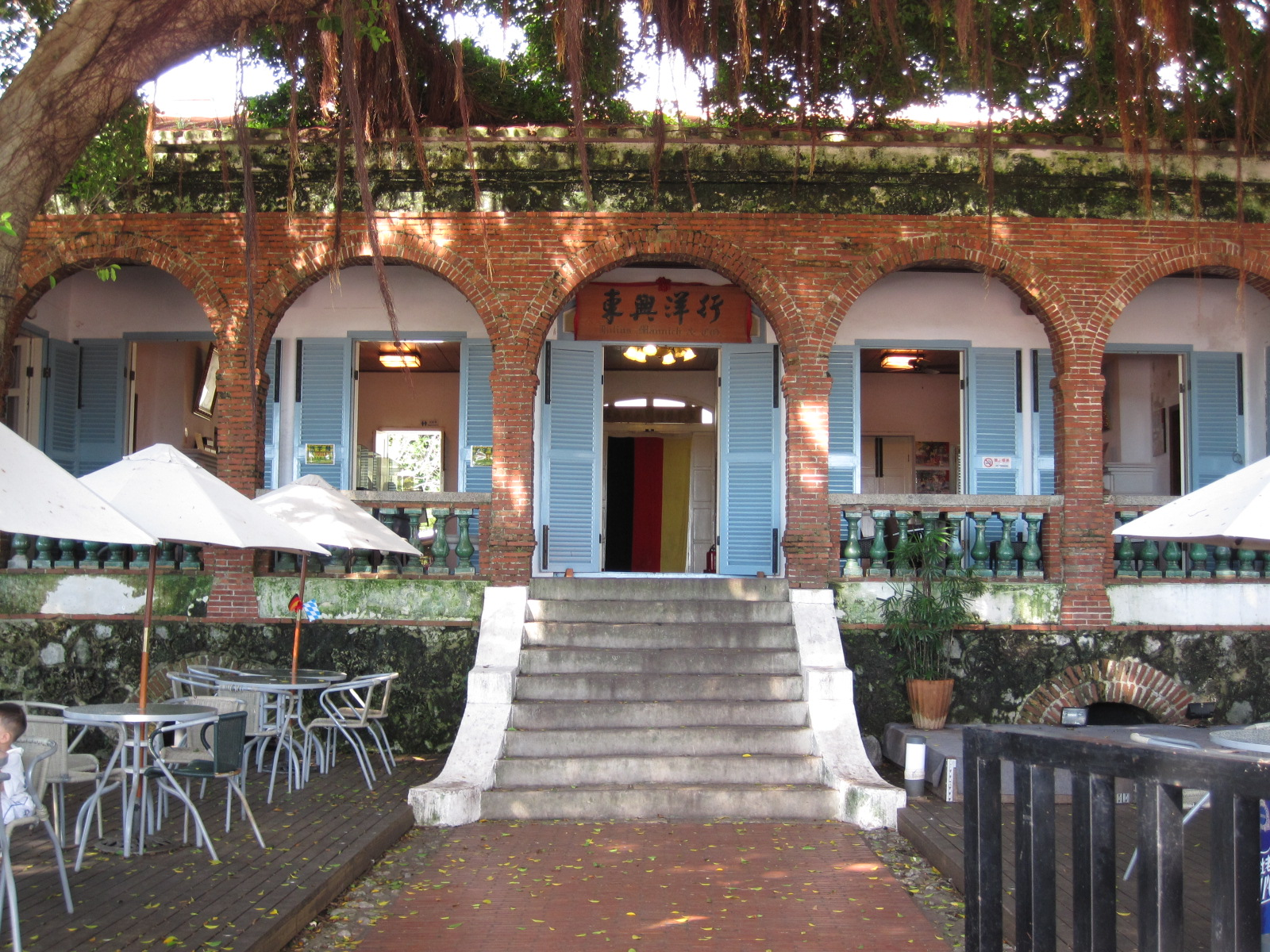
Former Julius Mannich & CO. Merchant House (德商東興洋行), Tainan City

Fort

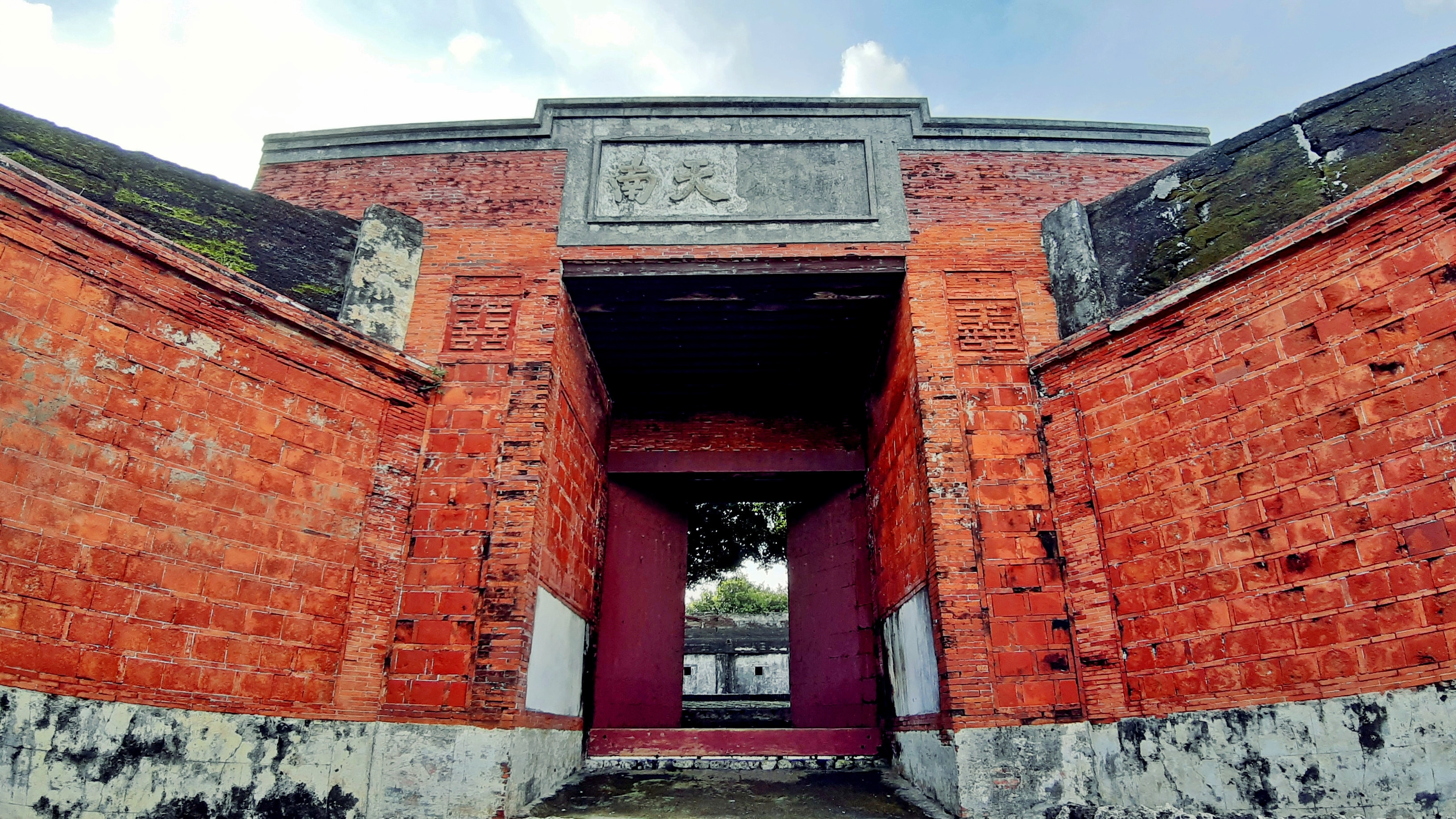
Cihou Fort, Kaohsiung City (1875)

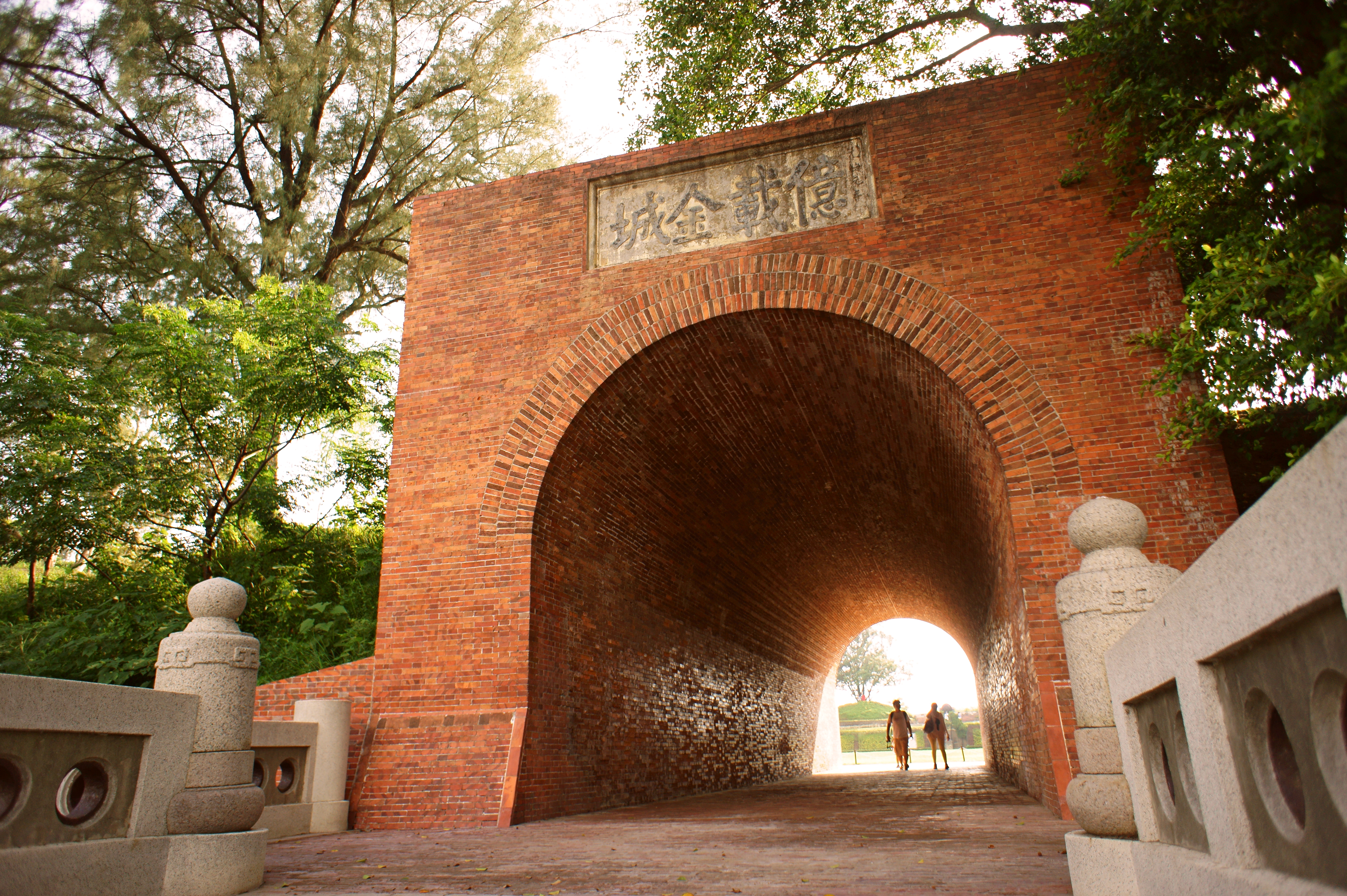
Eternal Golden Castle, Tainan City (1876)

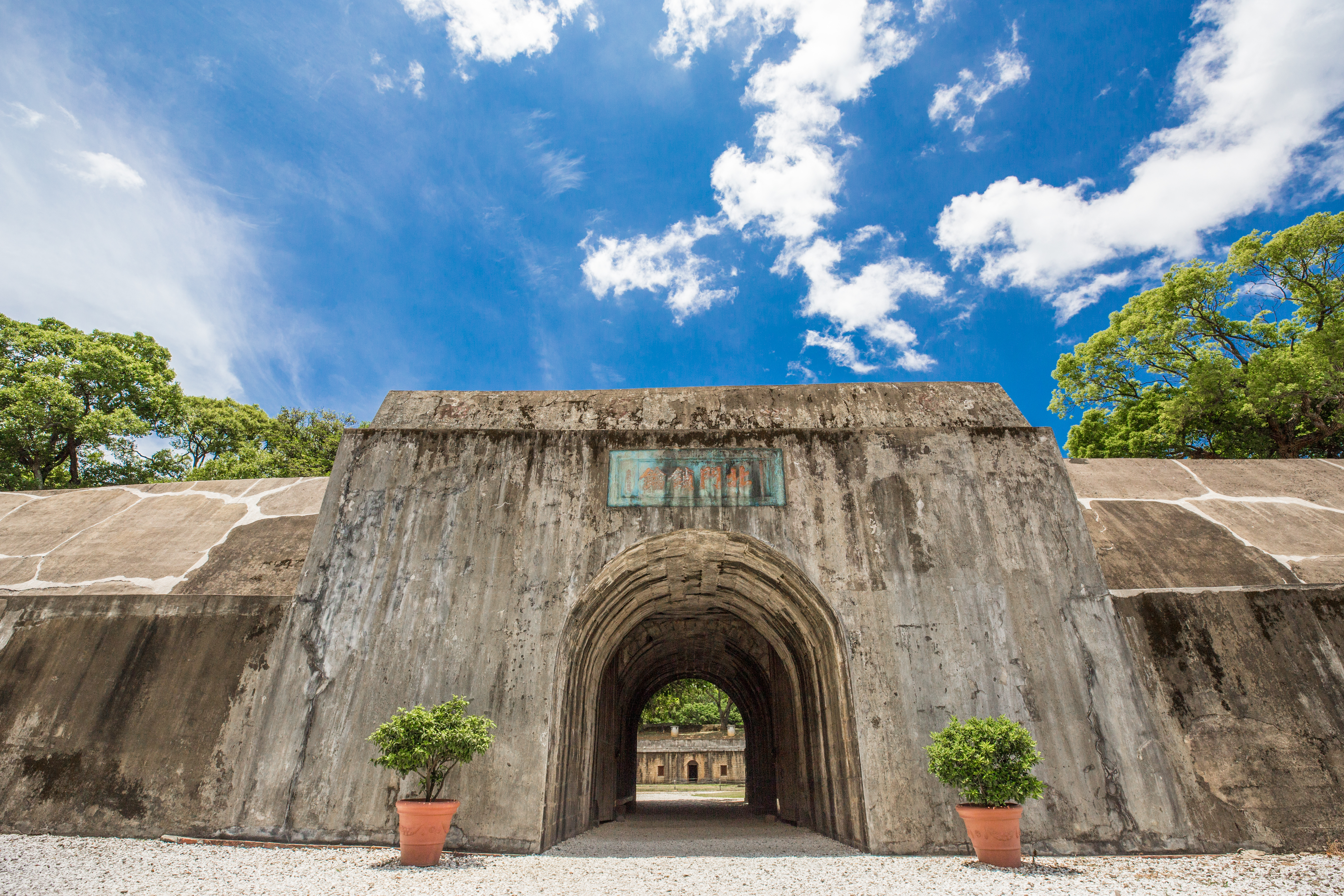
Hobe Fort, Tamsui, New Taipei City (1886)

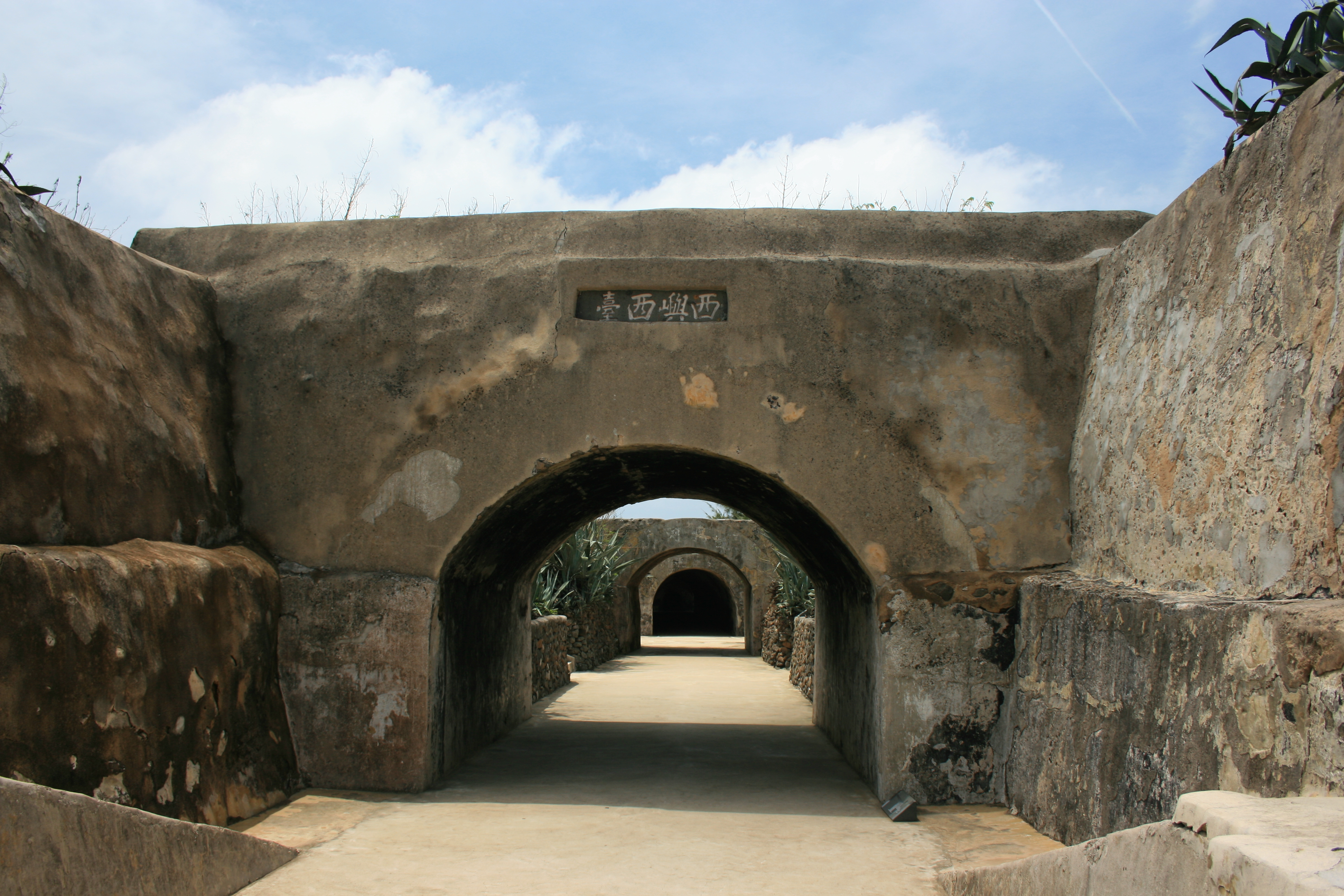
Xiyu Western Fort, Prnghu County (1889)

== Period of Japanese rule (1896–1945) ==
Western-style Architecture

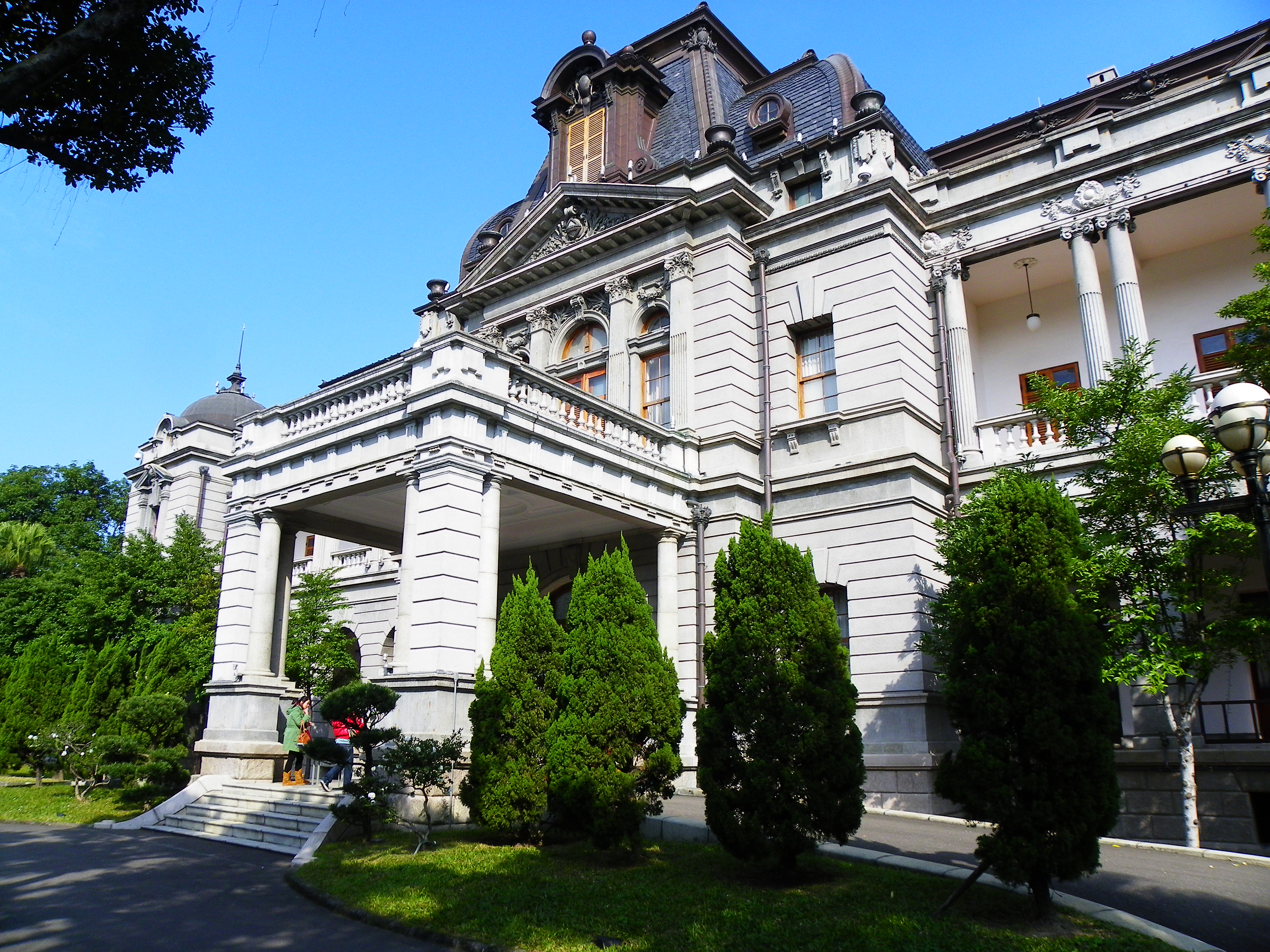
Taipei Guest House, Taipei City (1901–1913)

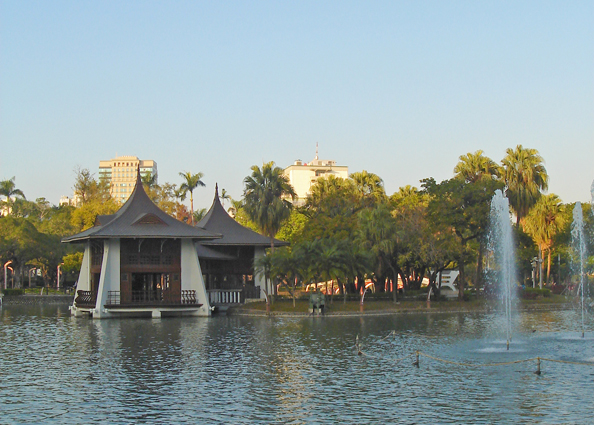
Mid-Lake Pavilion (湖心亭) in Taichung Park, Taichung City (1908)

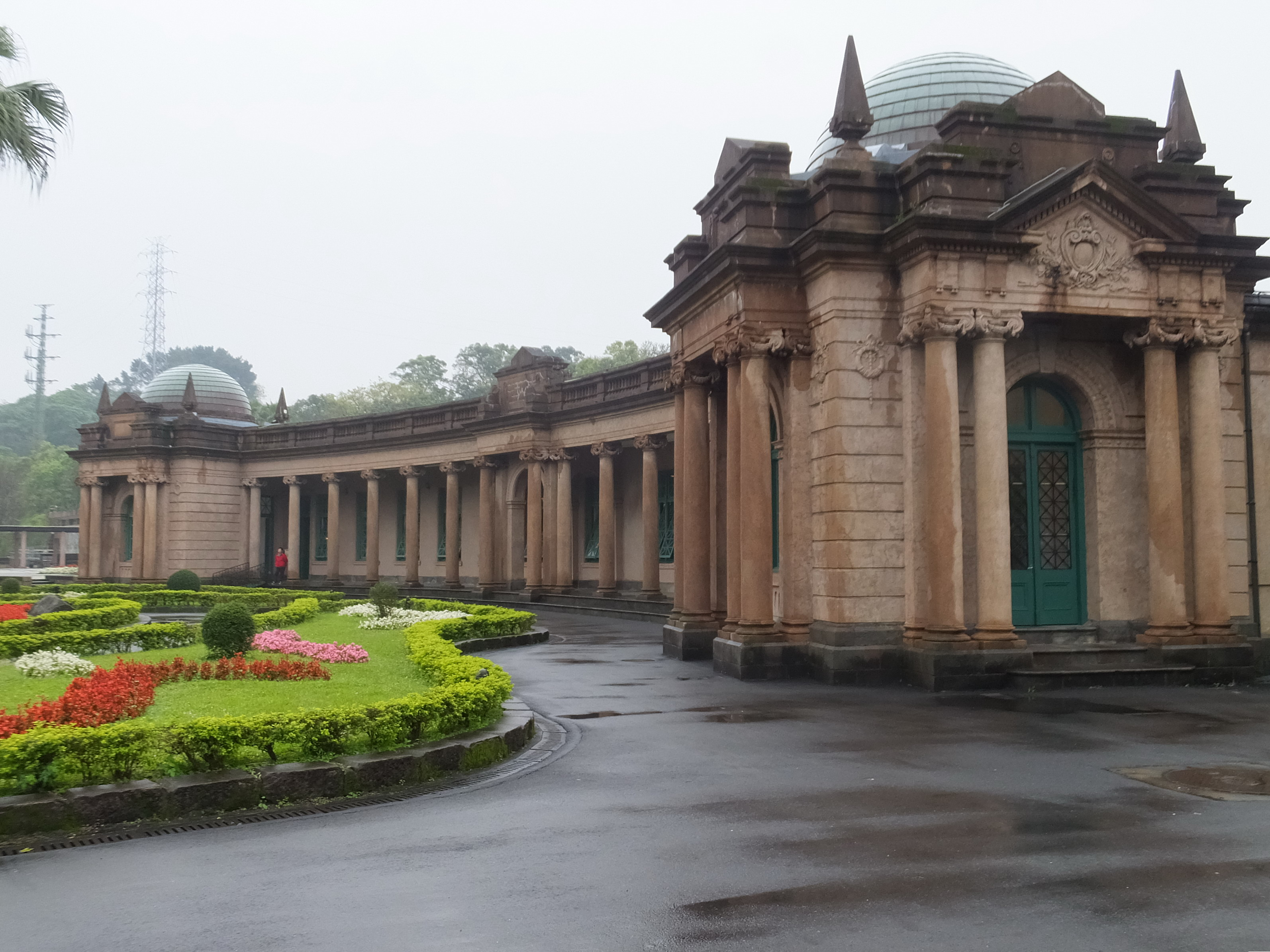
Museum of Drinking Water, Taipei City (1908)

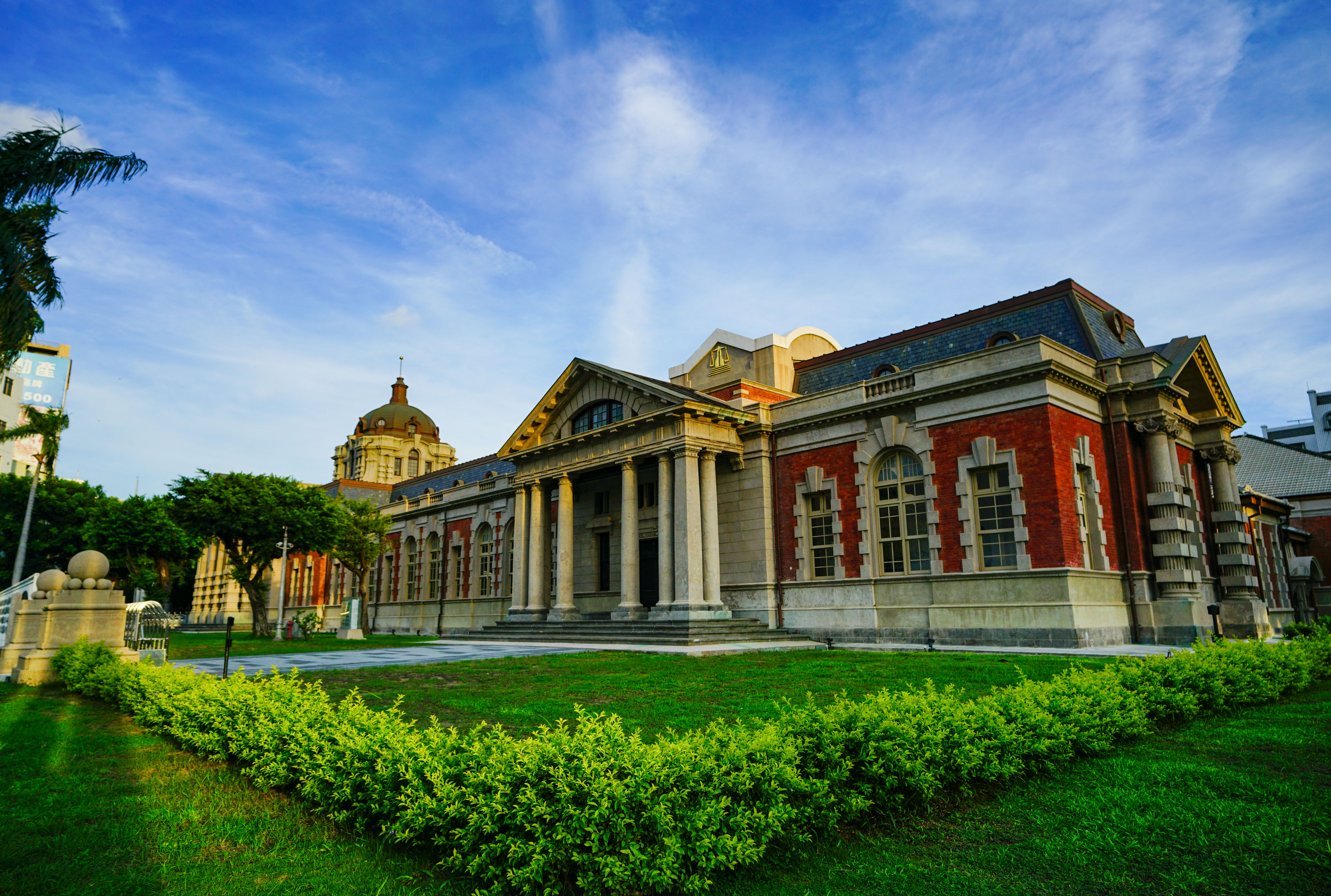
Former Tainan District Court, Tainan City (1912)

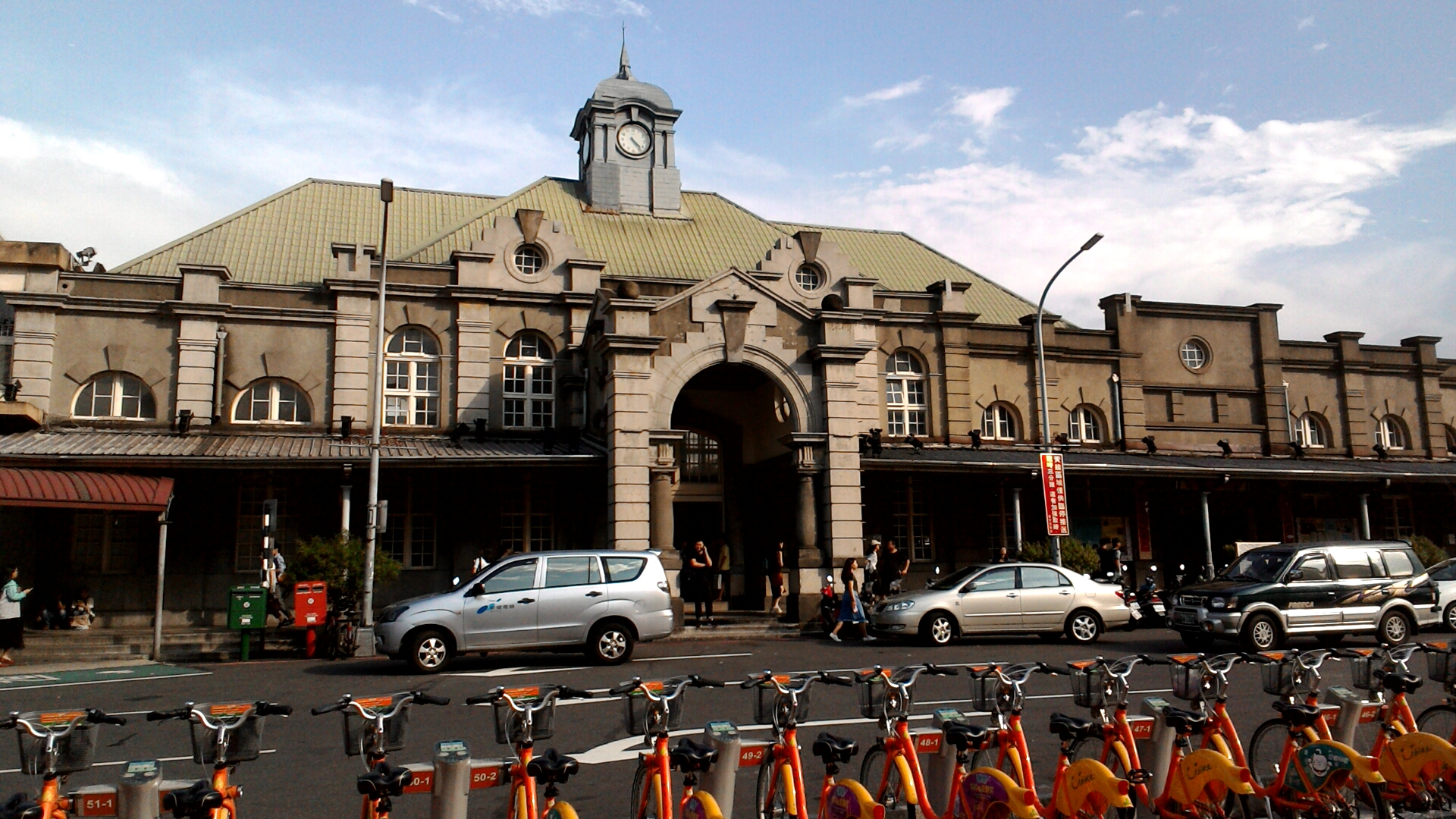
Hsinchu Railway Station, Hsinchu City (1913)

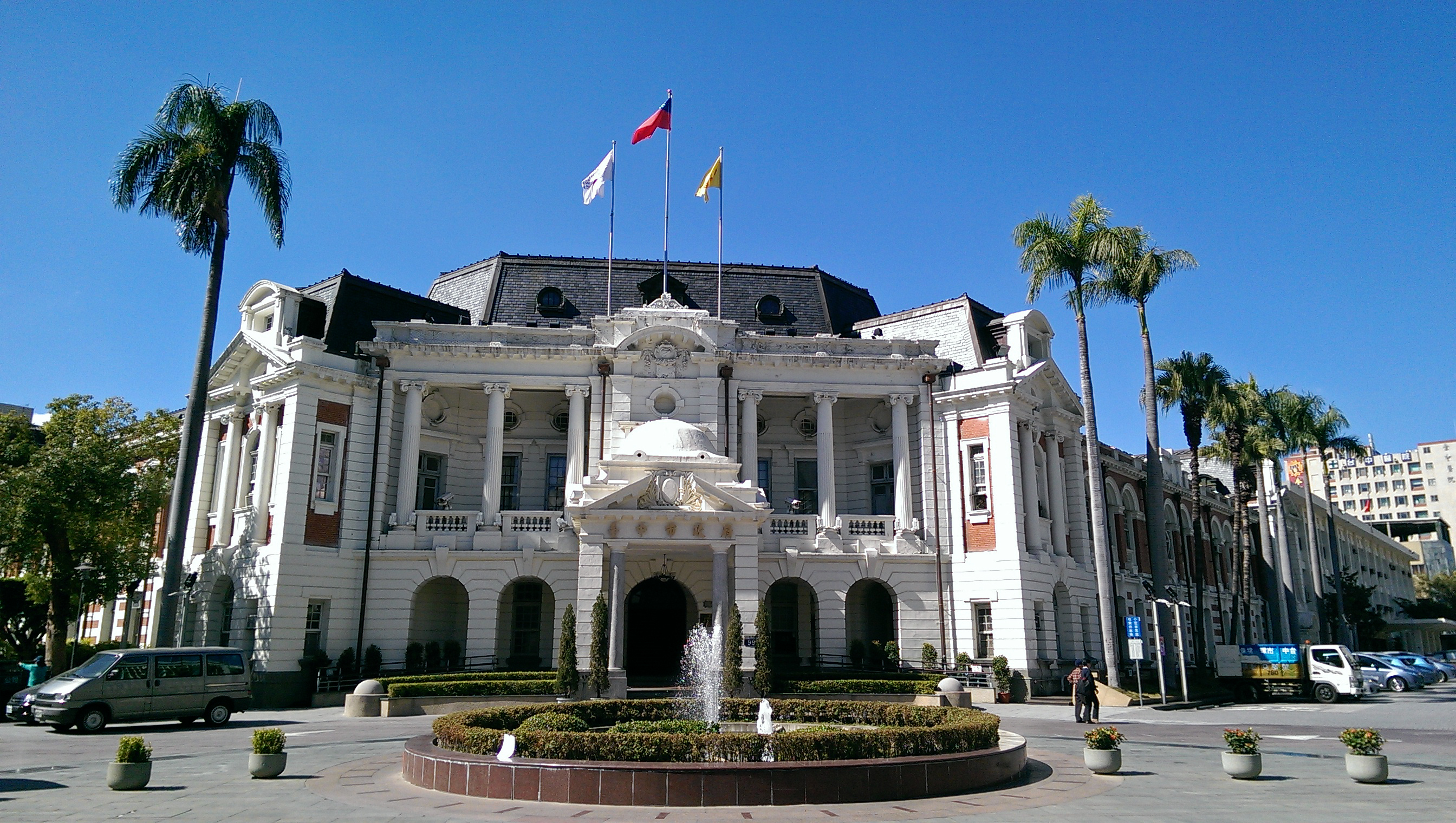
Former Taichu Prefecture Government Building, Taichung City (1913)

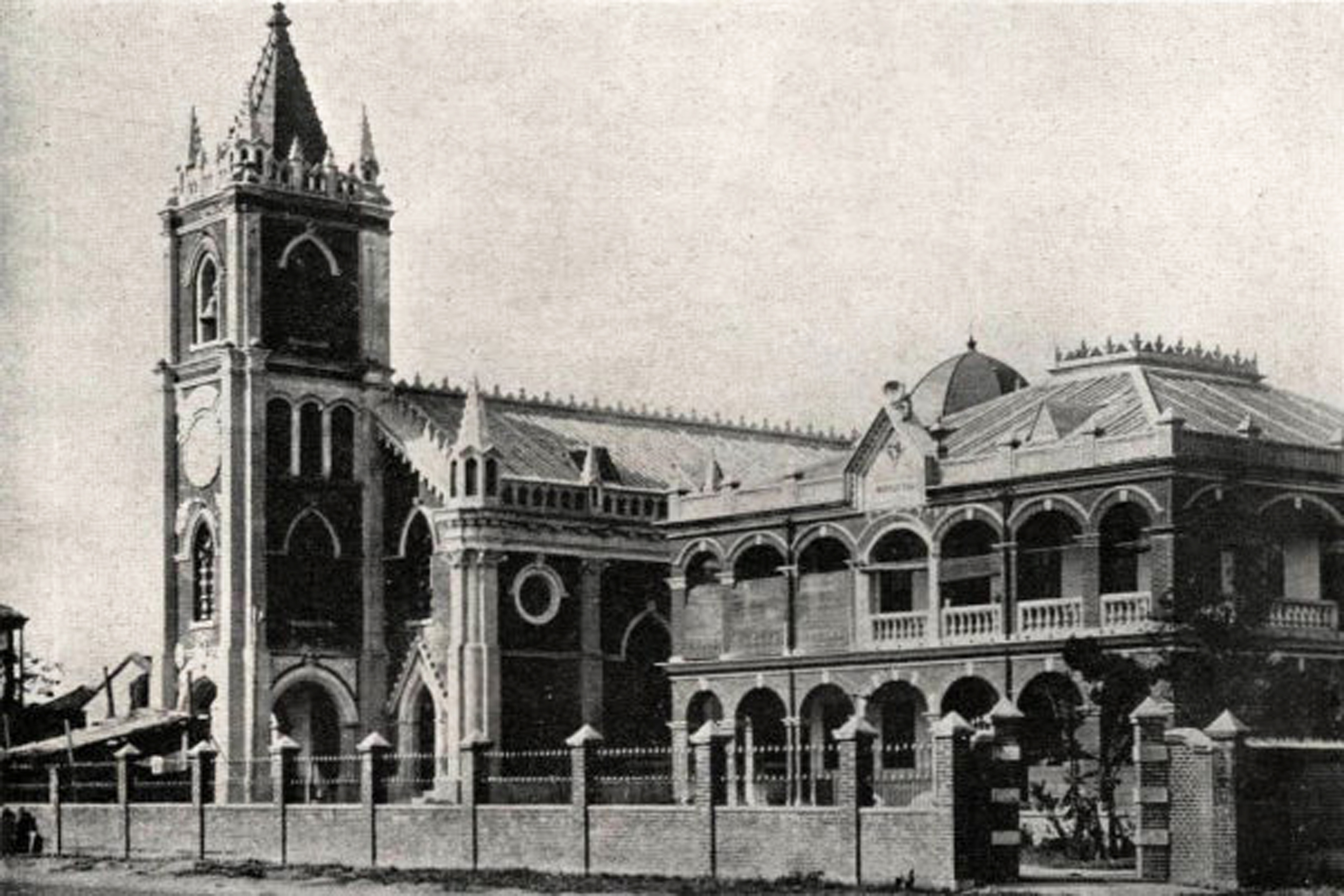
Immaculate Conception Cathedral, Taipei City (1914)

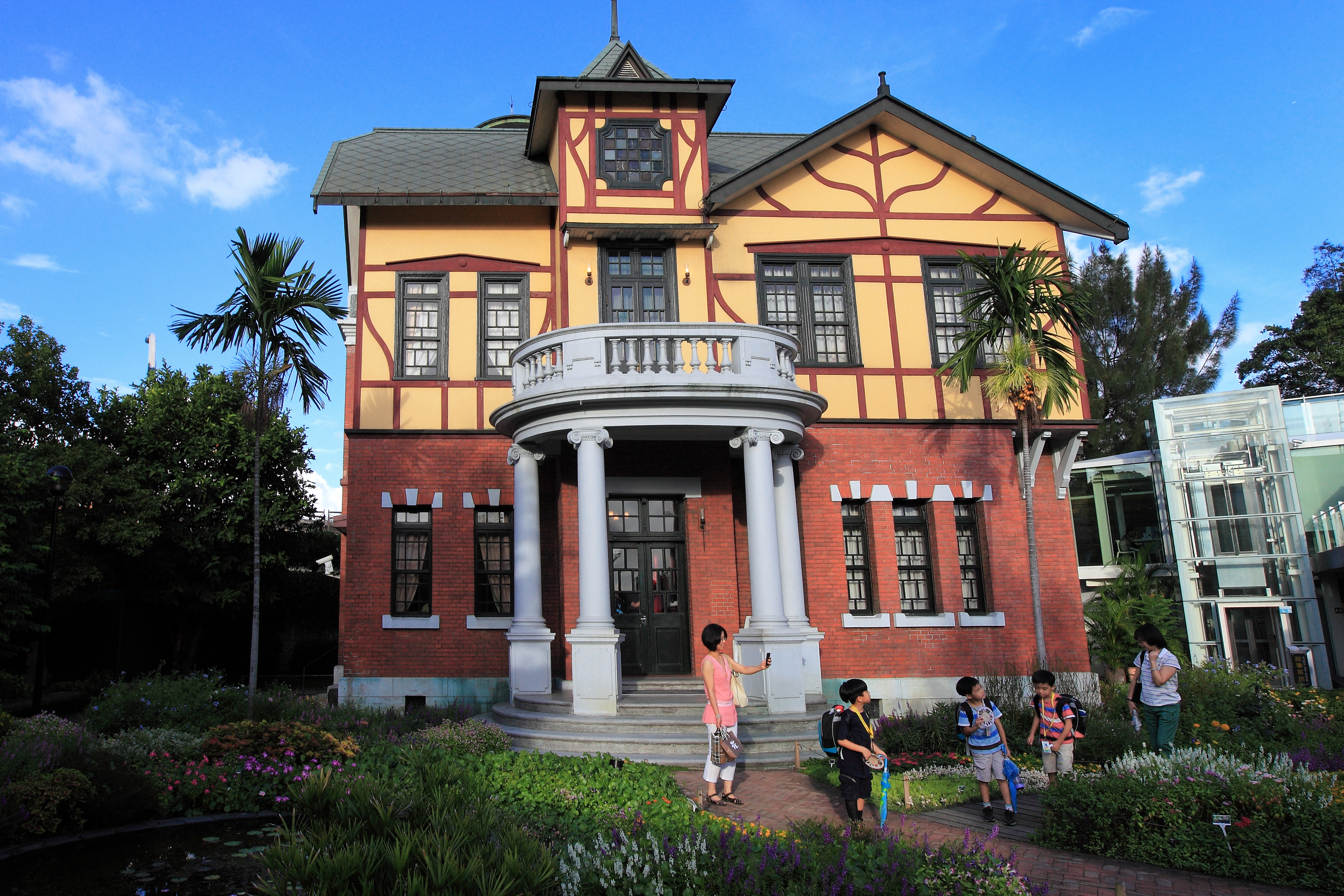
Taipei Story House, Taipei City (1914)

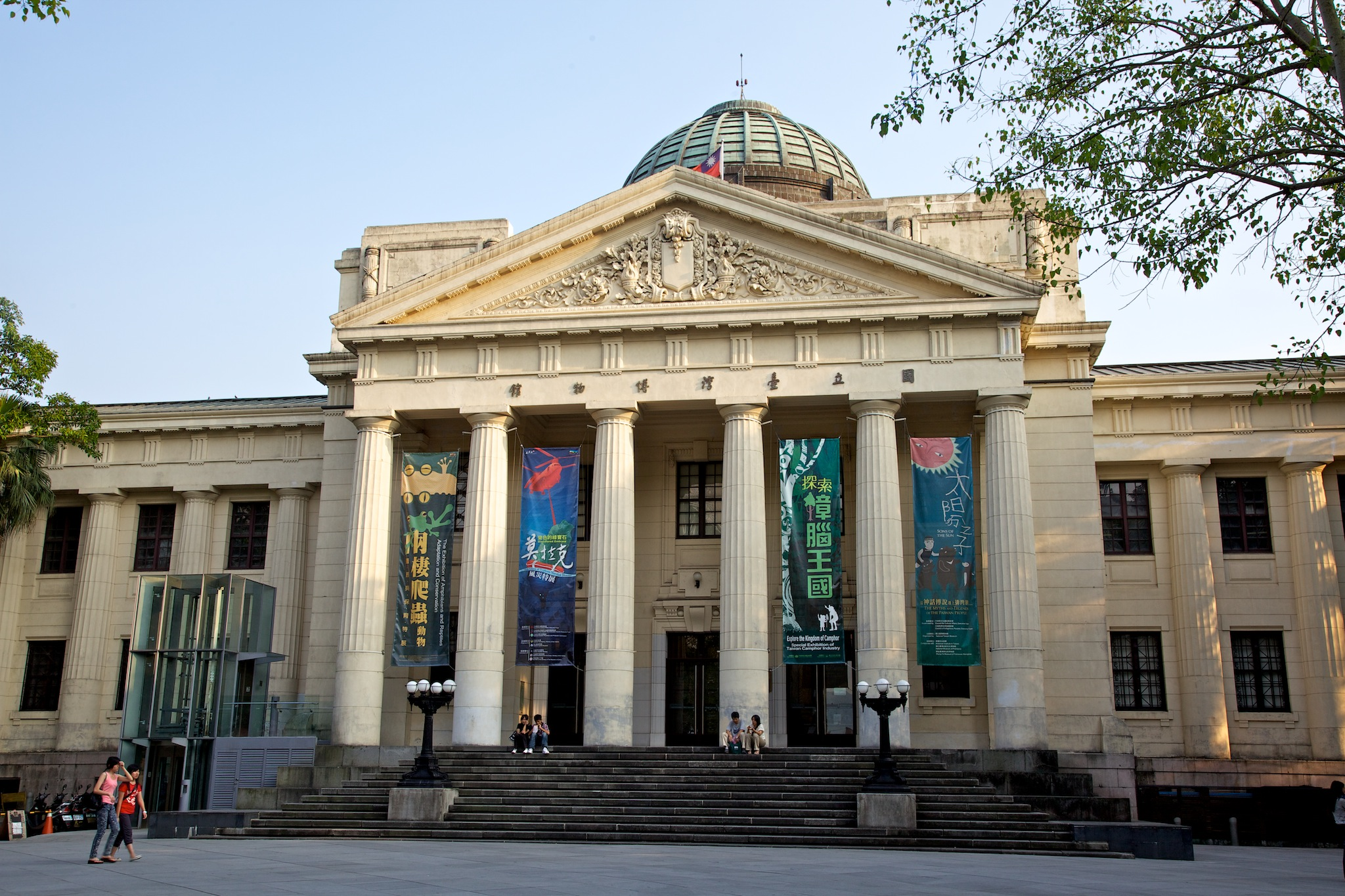
Former Kodama-Goto Memorial Hall, Taipei City (1915)

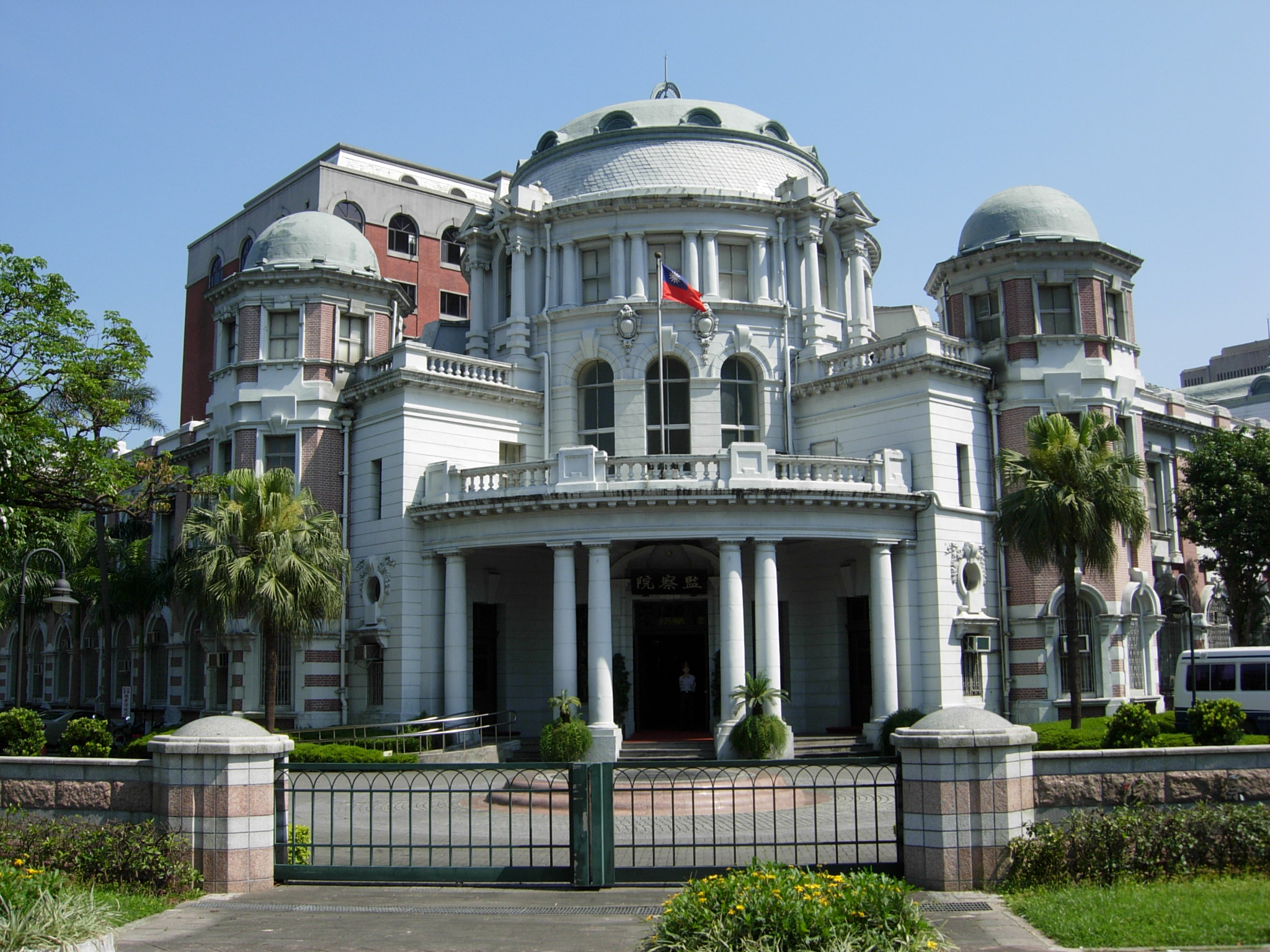
Former Taihoku Prefecture Government Building, Taipei City (1915)

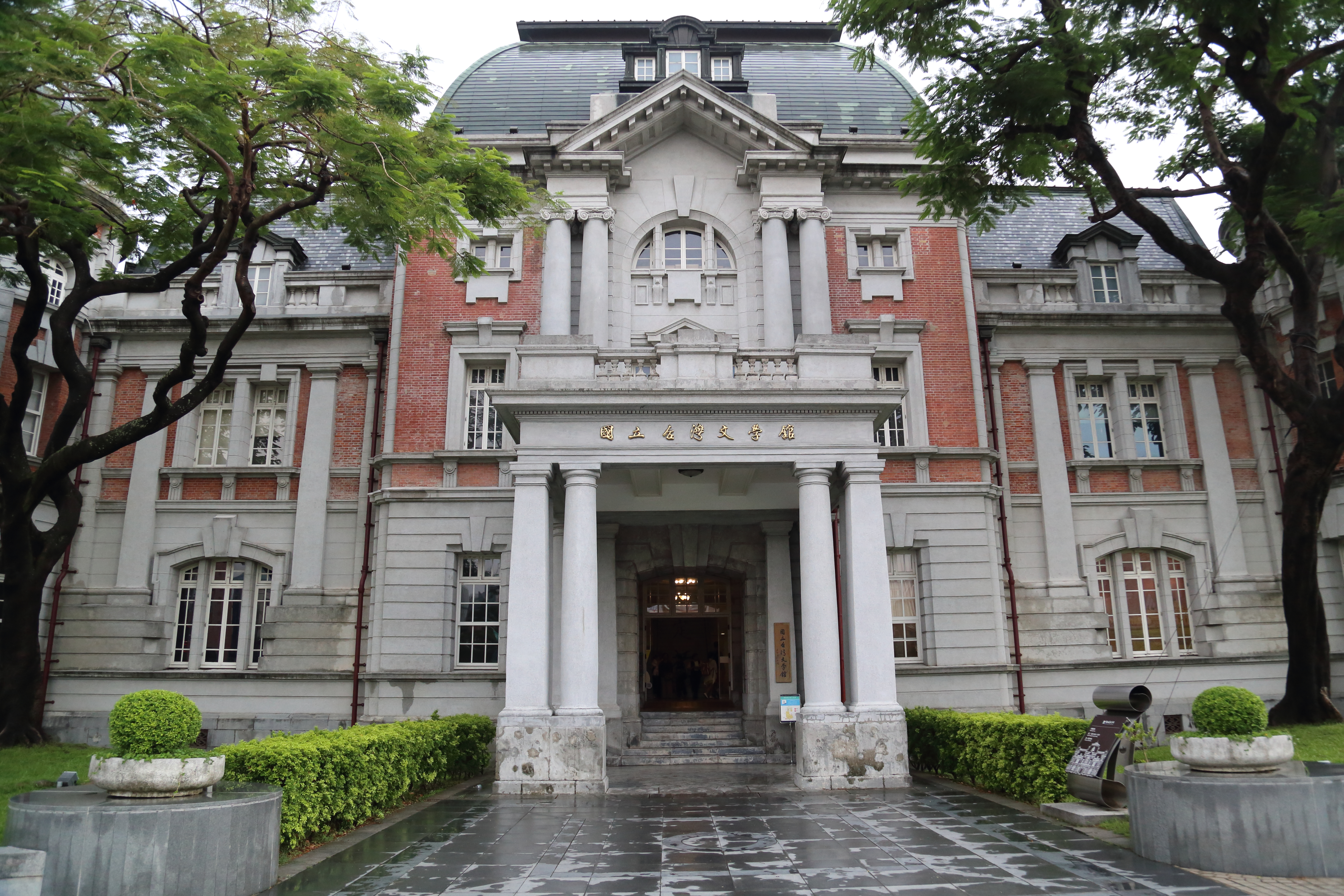
Former Tainan Prefecture Government Building, Tainan City (1916)

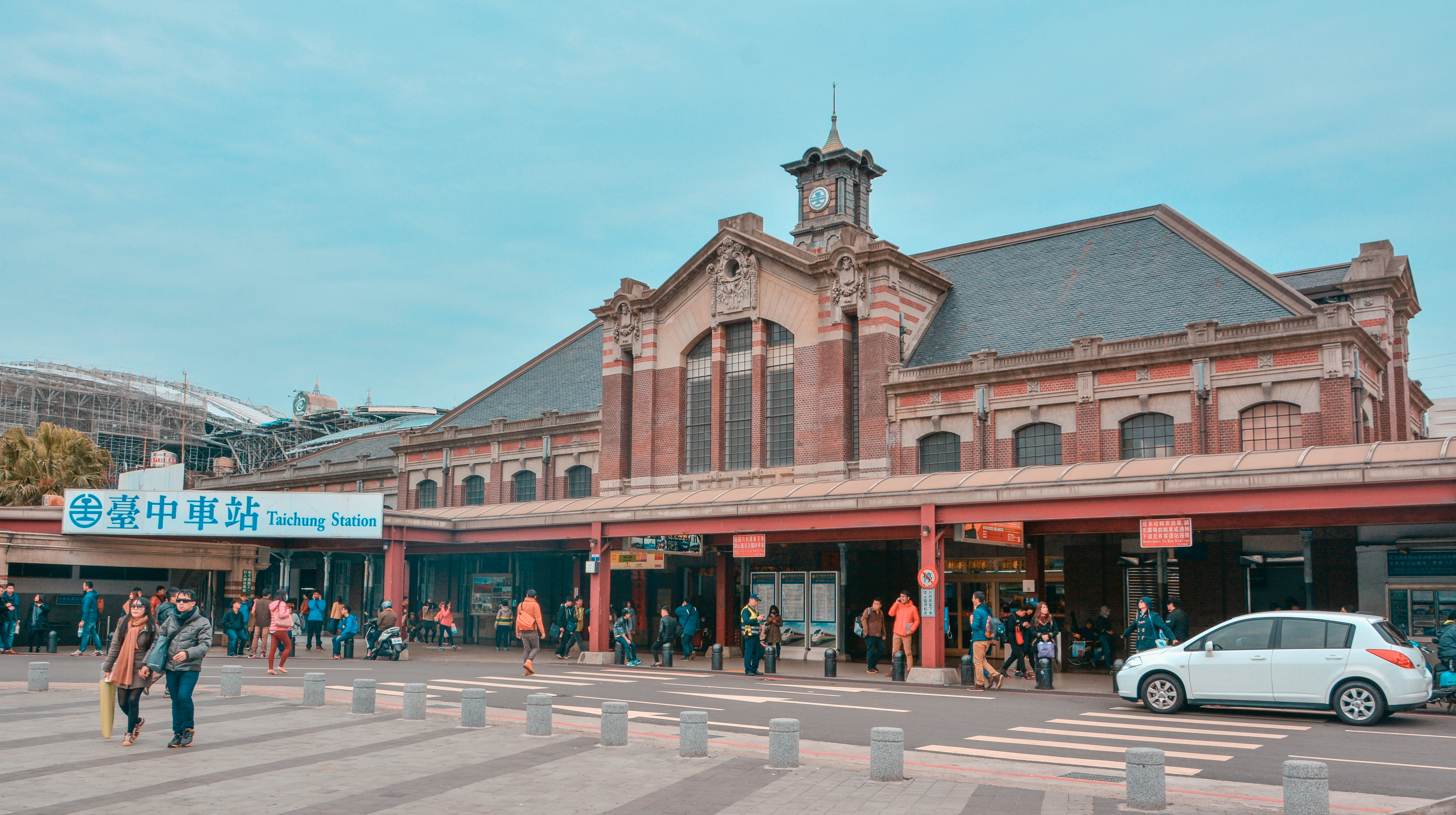
Former Taichung Railway Station, Taichung City (1917)

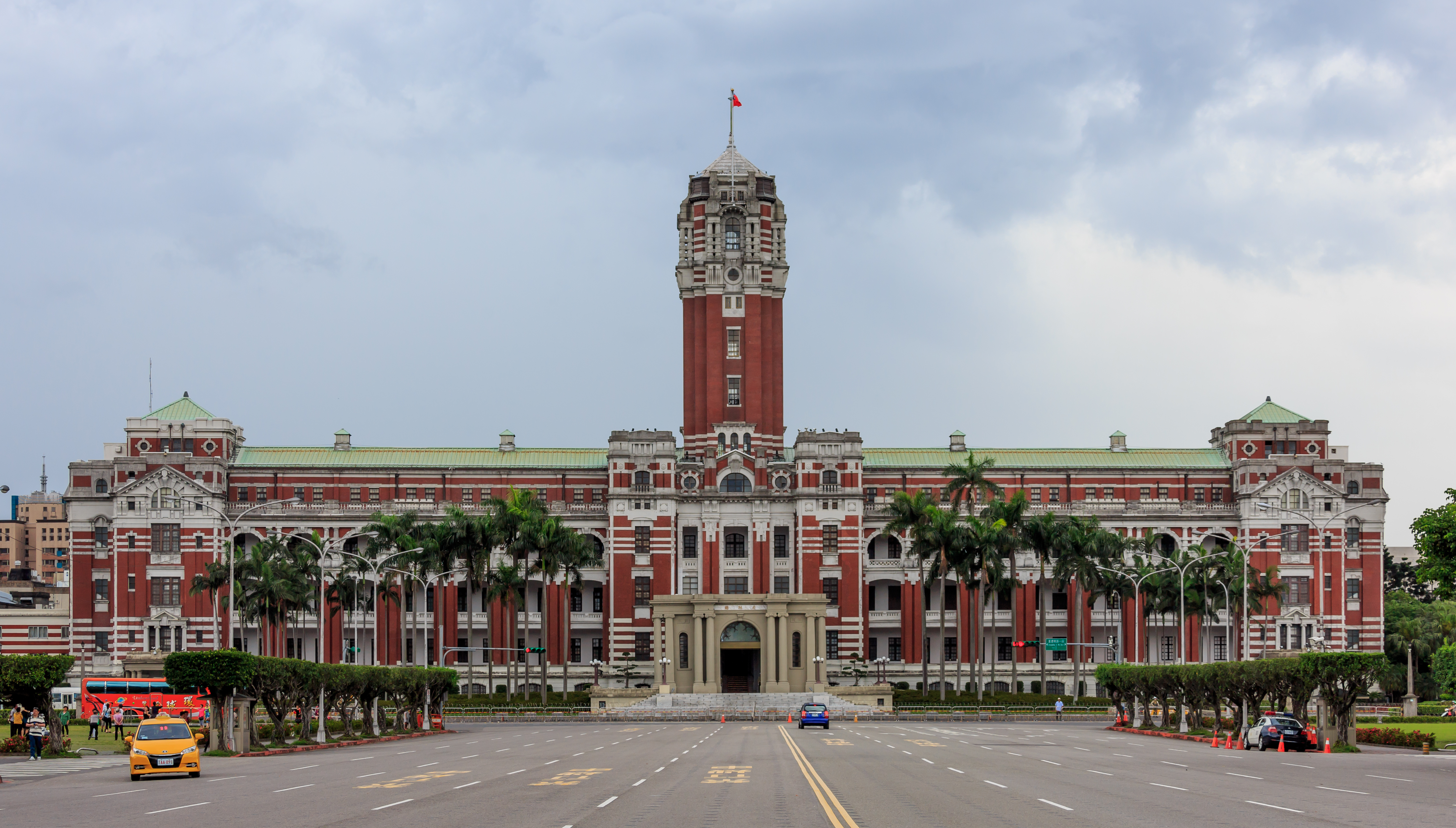
Former Office of the Governor-General of Taiwan, Taipei City (1919)

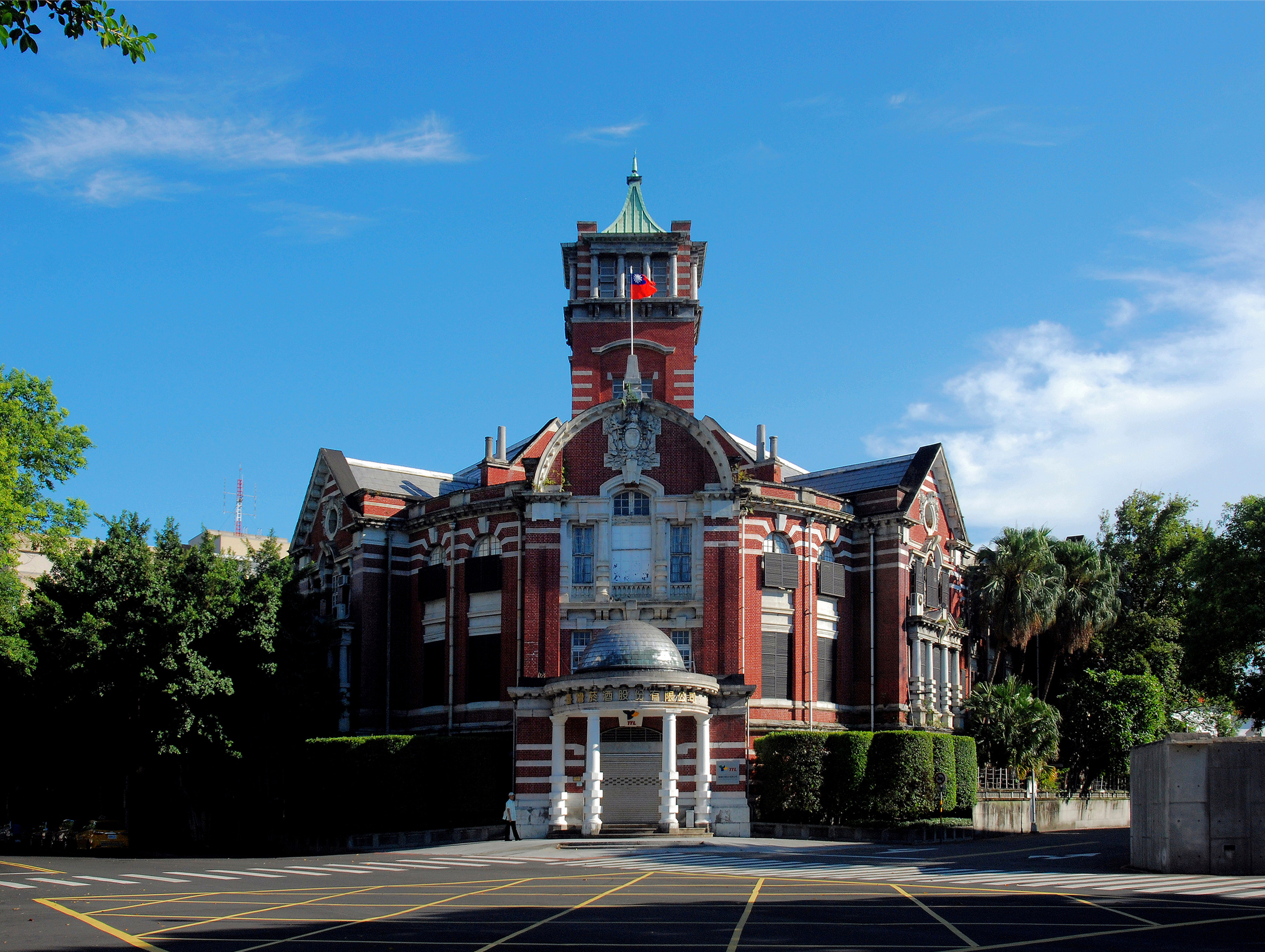
Monopoly Bureau, Taipei City (1922)

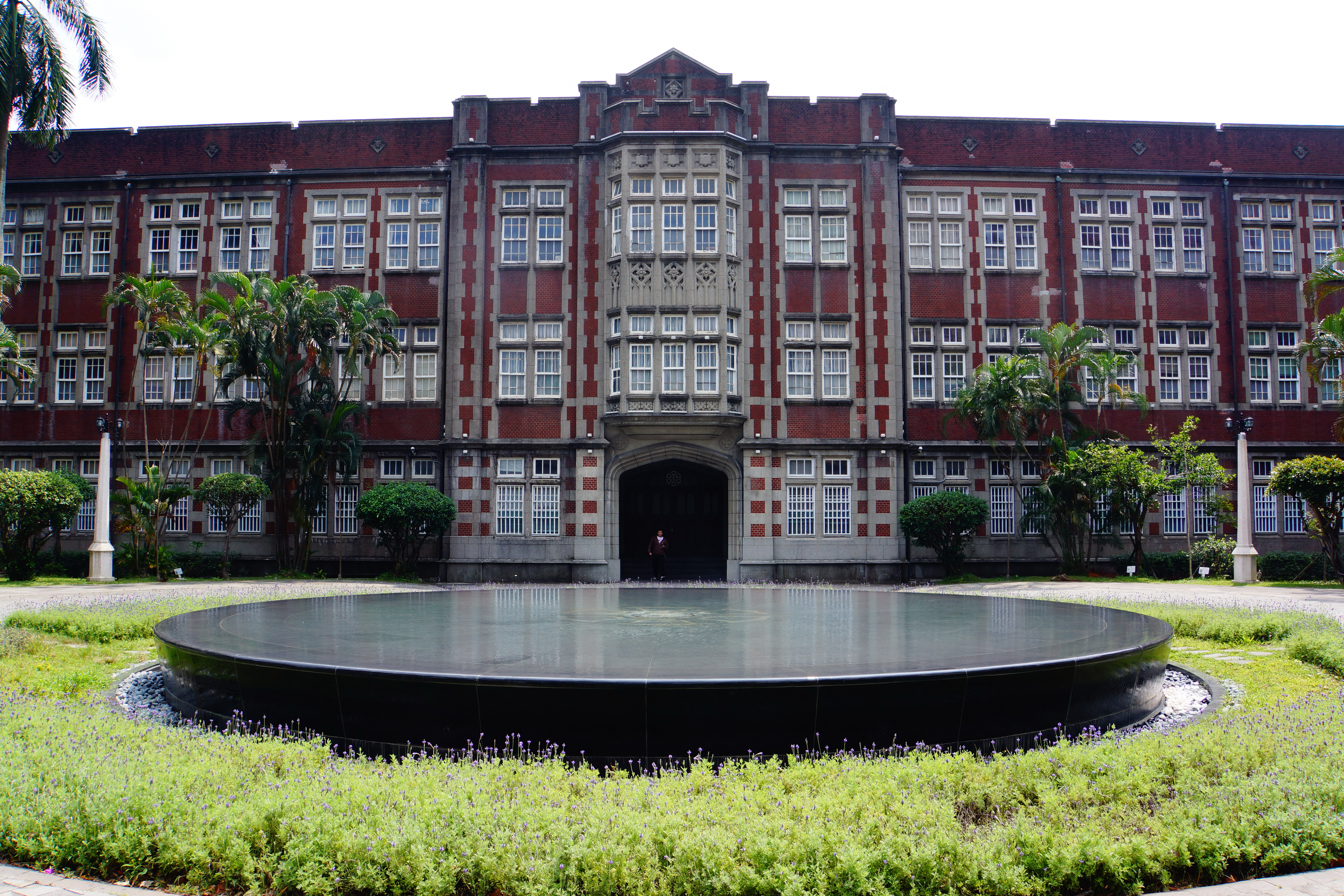
Administration Building of National Taiwan Normal University, Taipei (1929)

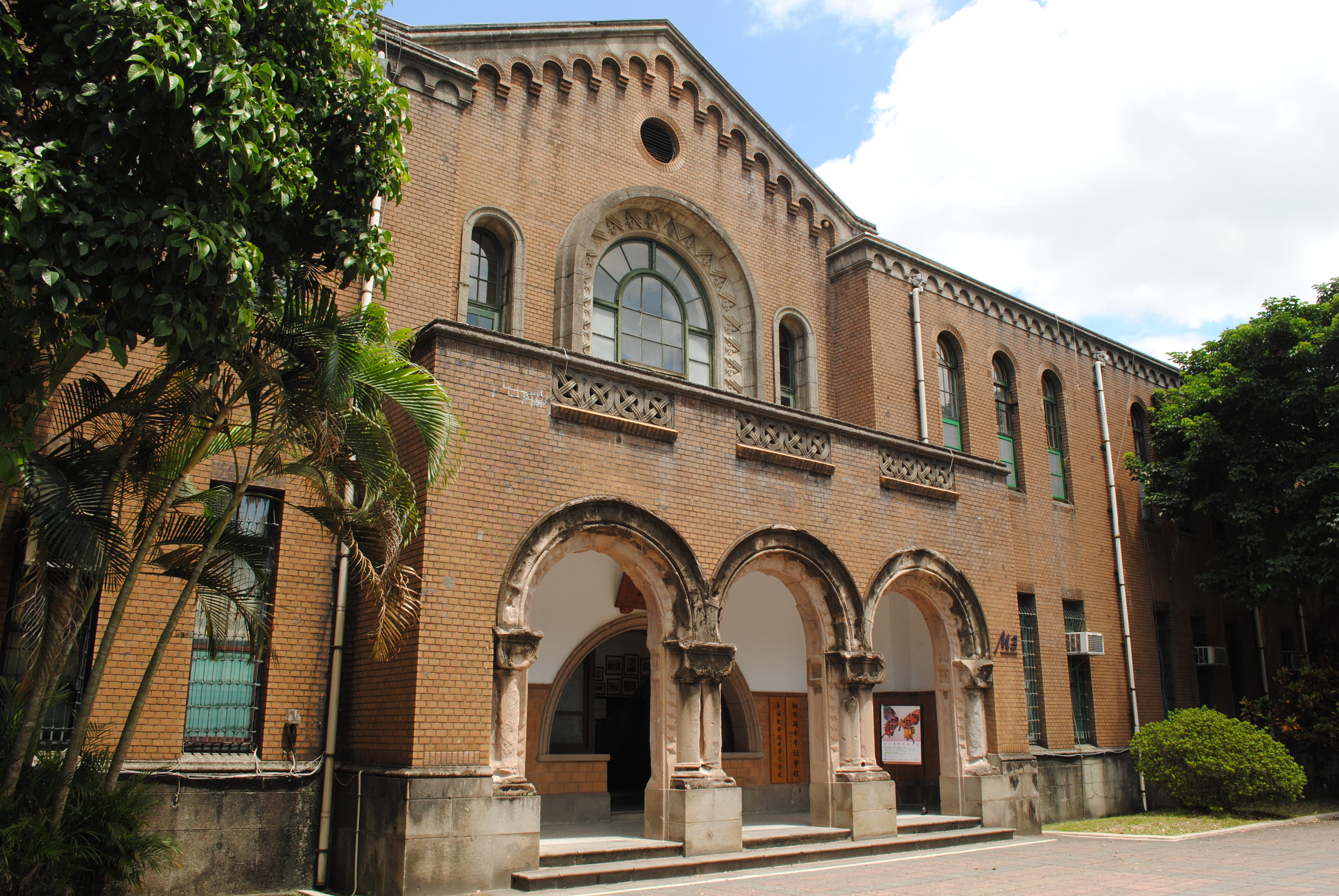
Former Library of Taihoku Imperial University (台北帝國大學圖書館), Taipei City (1930)

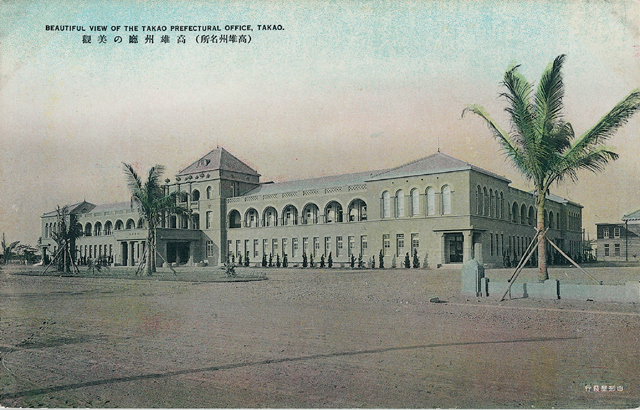
Takao Prefecture Government Building (高雄州廳), Kaohsiung City (1931)

Exotic Revival Style

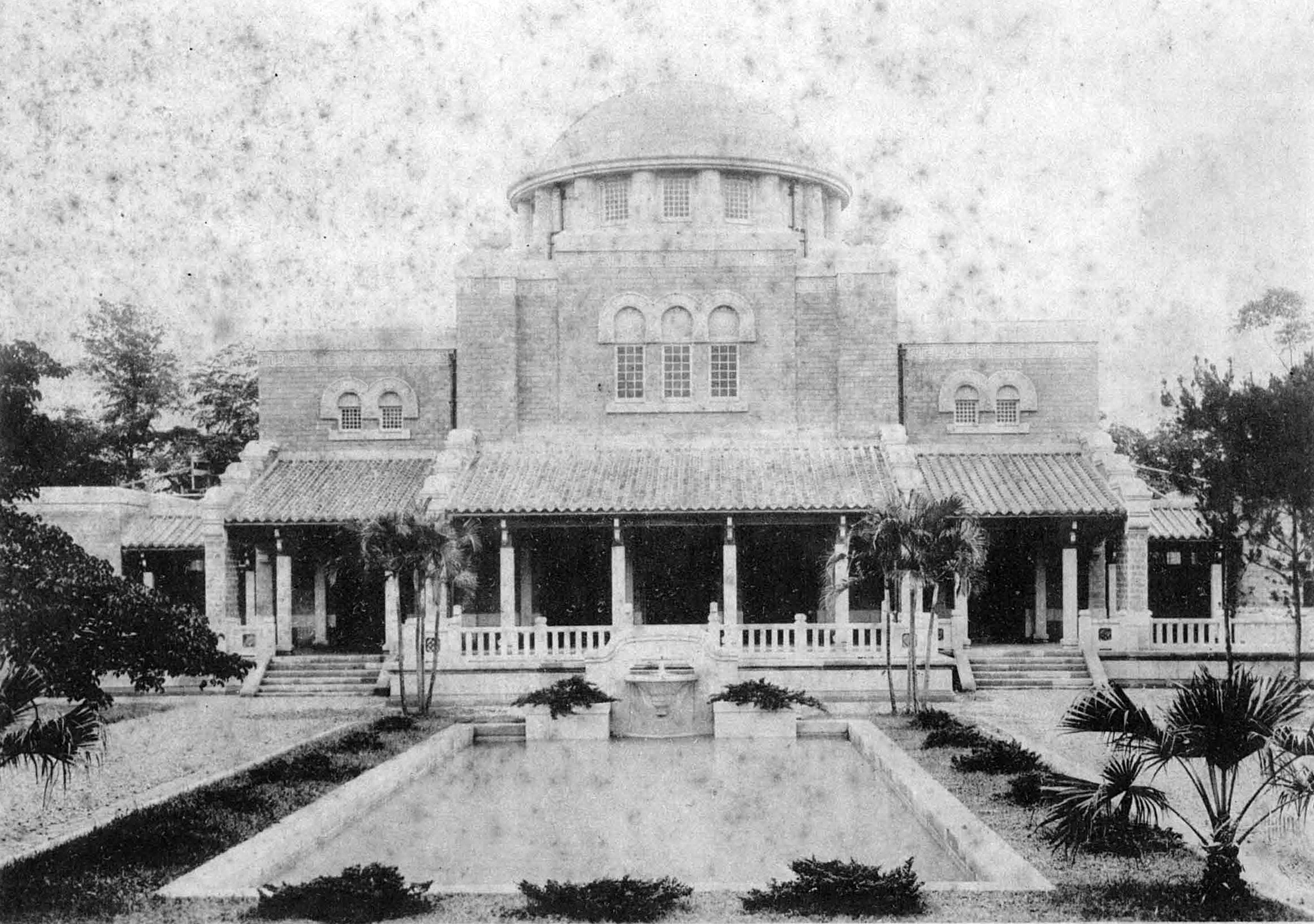
Kenko Shrine (建功神社), Taipei City (1928), designed by Ide Kaoru

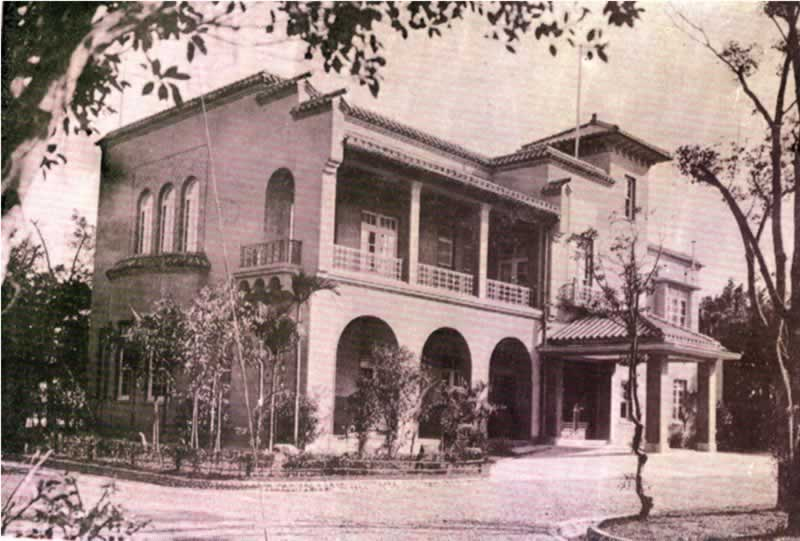
Former THK Taipei Broadcasting Station (台北放送局演奏所), Taipei City (1931)

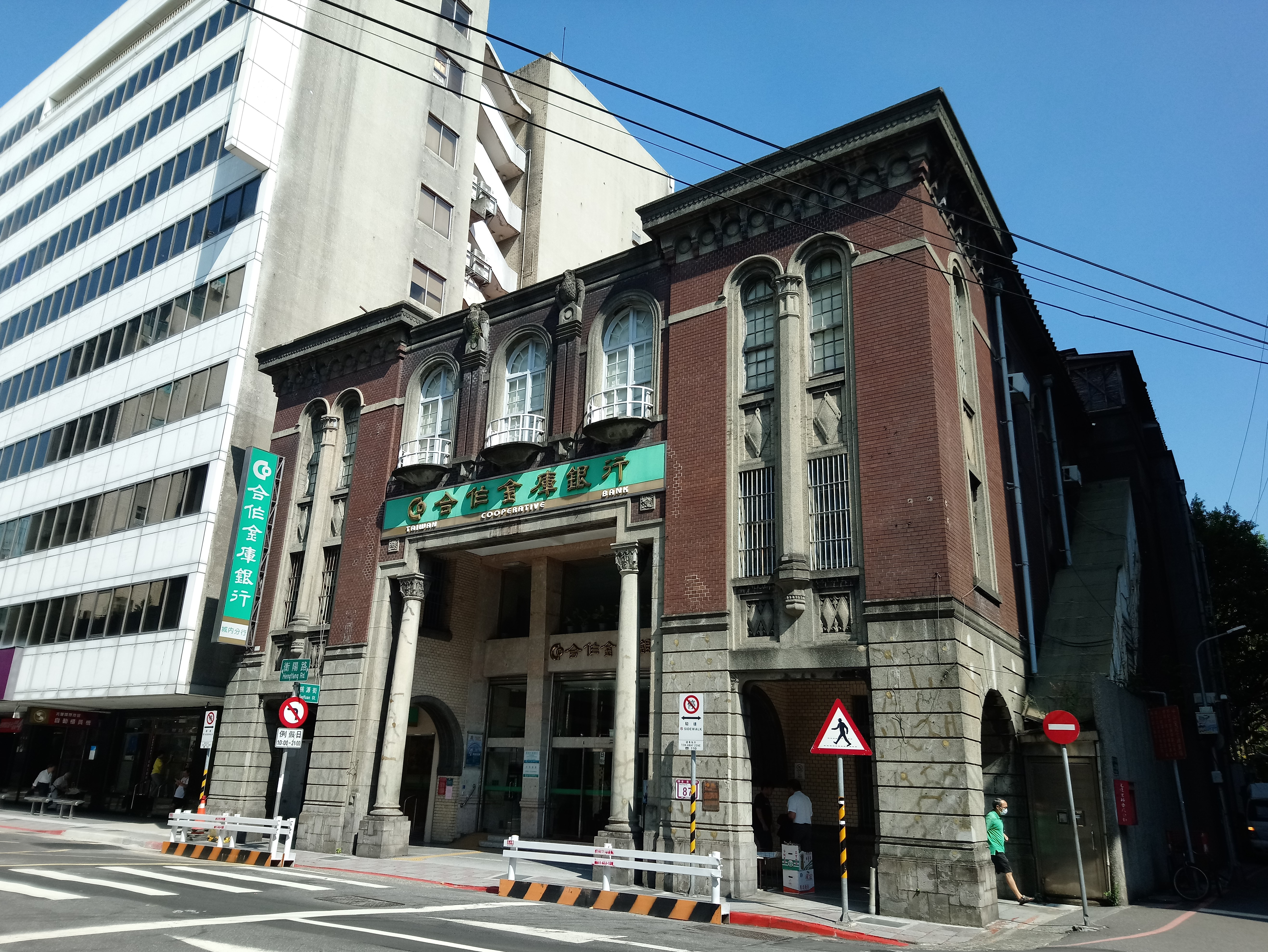
Chengnei Branch of Taiwan Cooperative Bank (合作金庫銀行城內分行), Taipei City (1933), designed by Ide Kaoru

Former Taipei Branch of Nippon Kangyo Bank (日本勸業銀行臺北支店), Taipei City (1933)

Former Tainan Branch of Nippon Kangyo Bank (日本勸業銀行臺南支店), Tainan City (1937)

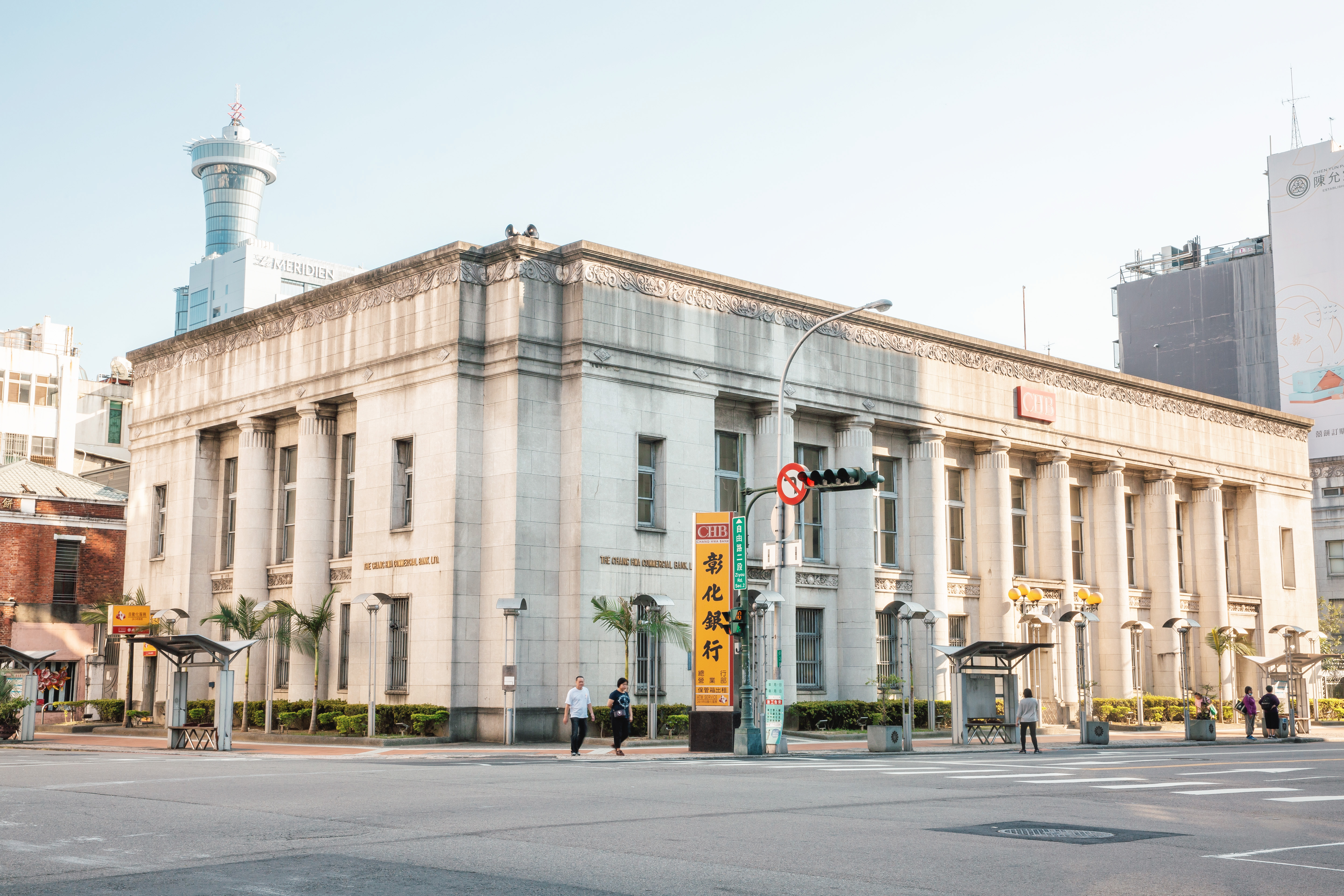
Chang Hwa Bank Headquarters and Museum, Taichung City (1937)

Early Modern Architecture

Former Shinchiku Prefecture Government Building (新竹州廳), Hsinchu City (1927)

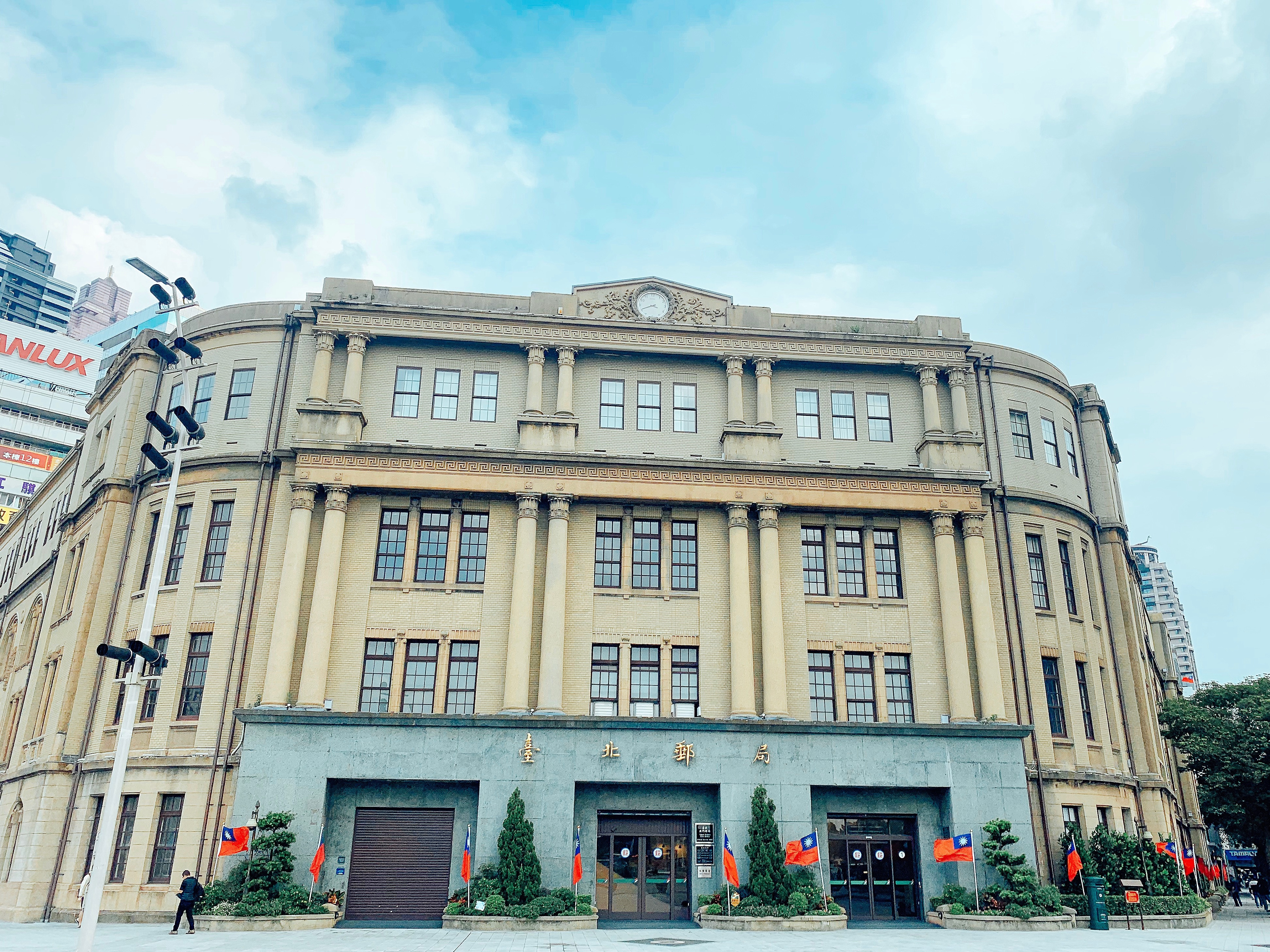
Taipei Post Office, Taipei City (1928)

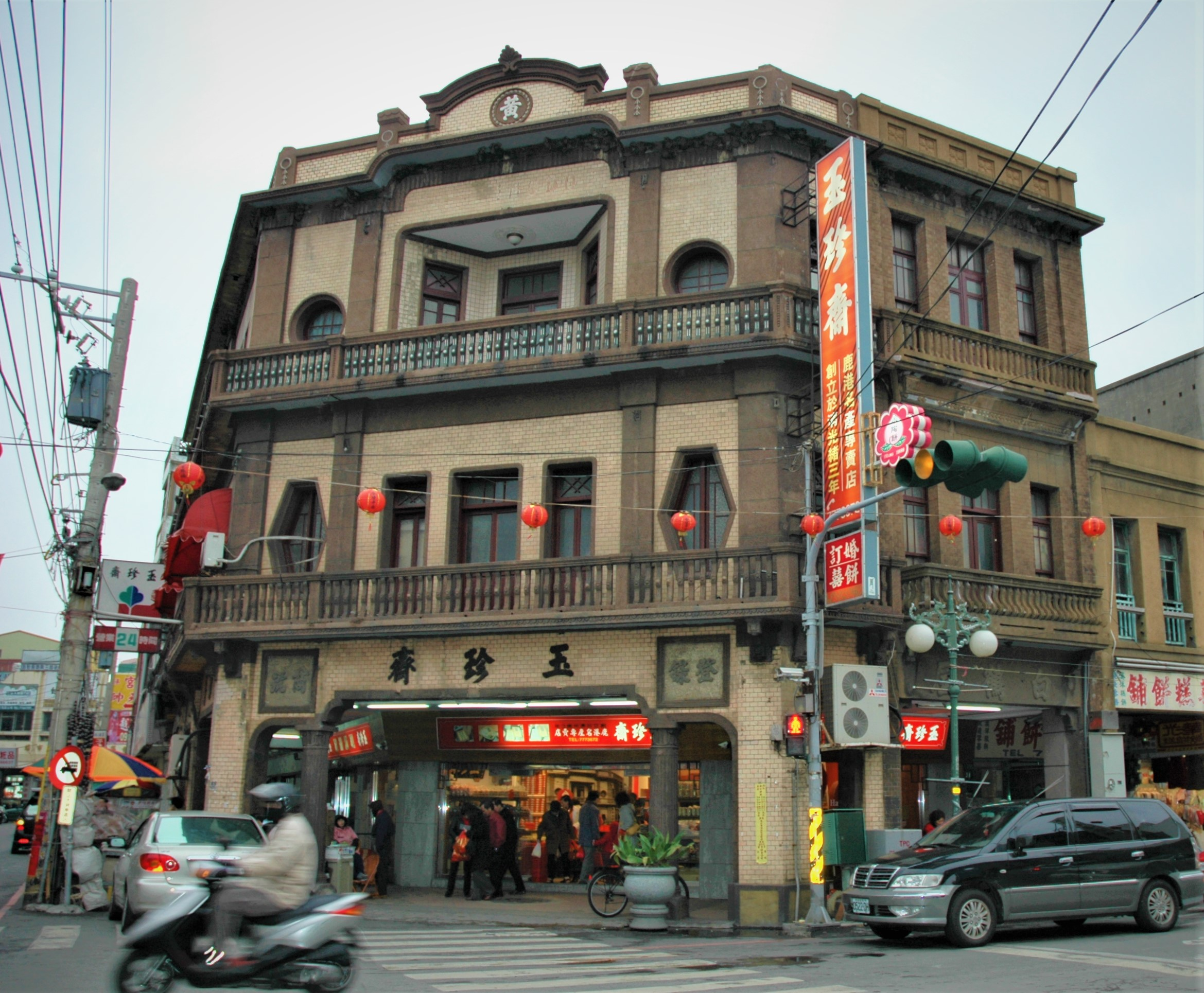
Yu Jen Jai, Changhua County (1930)

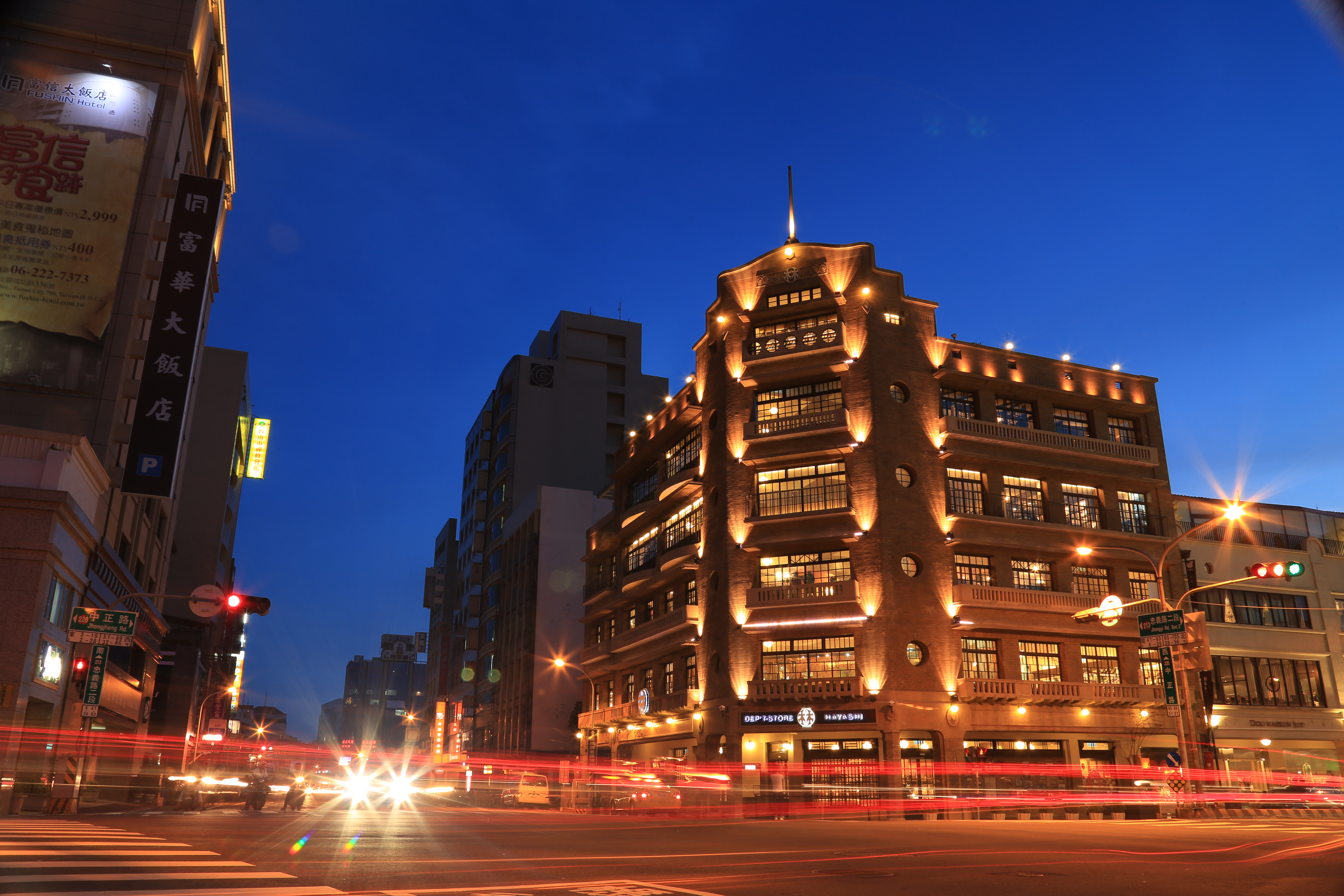
Hayashi Department Store, Tainan City (1922)

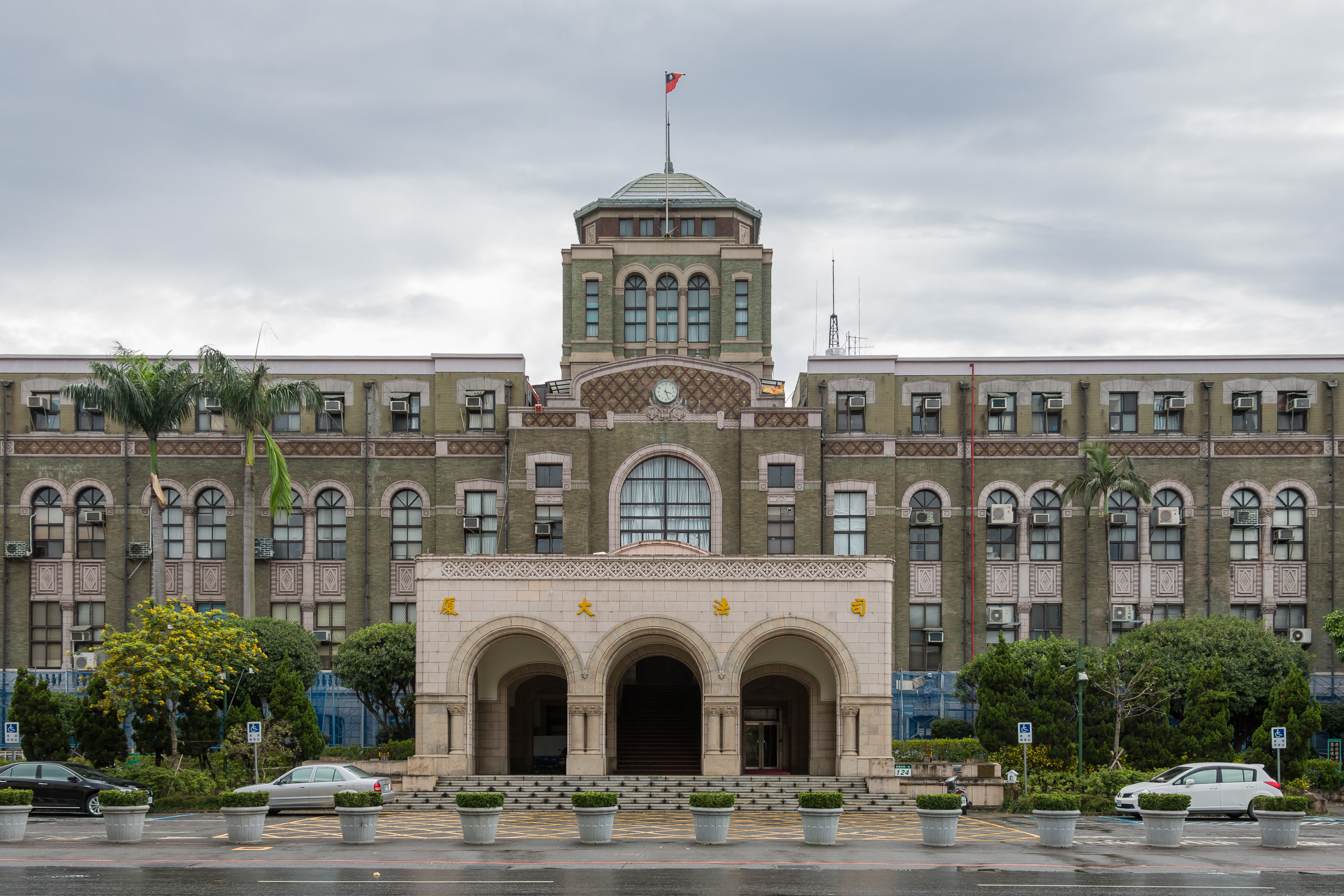
Taiwan High Court, Taipei City (1934), designed by Ide Kaoru

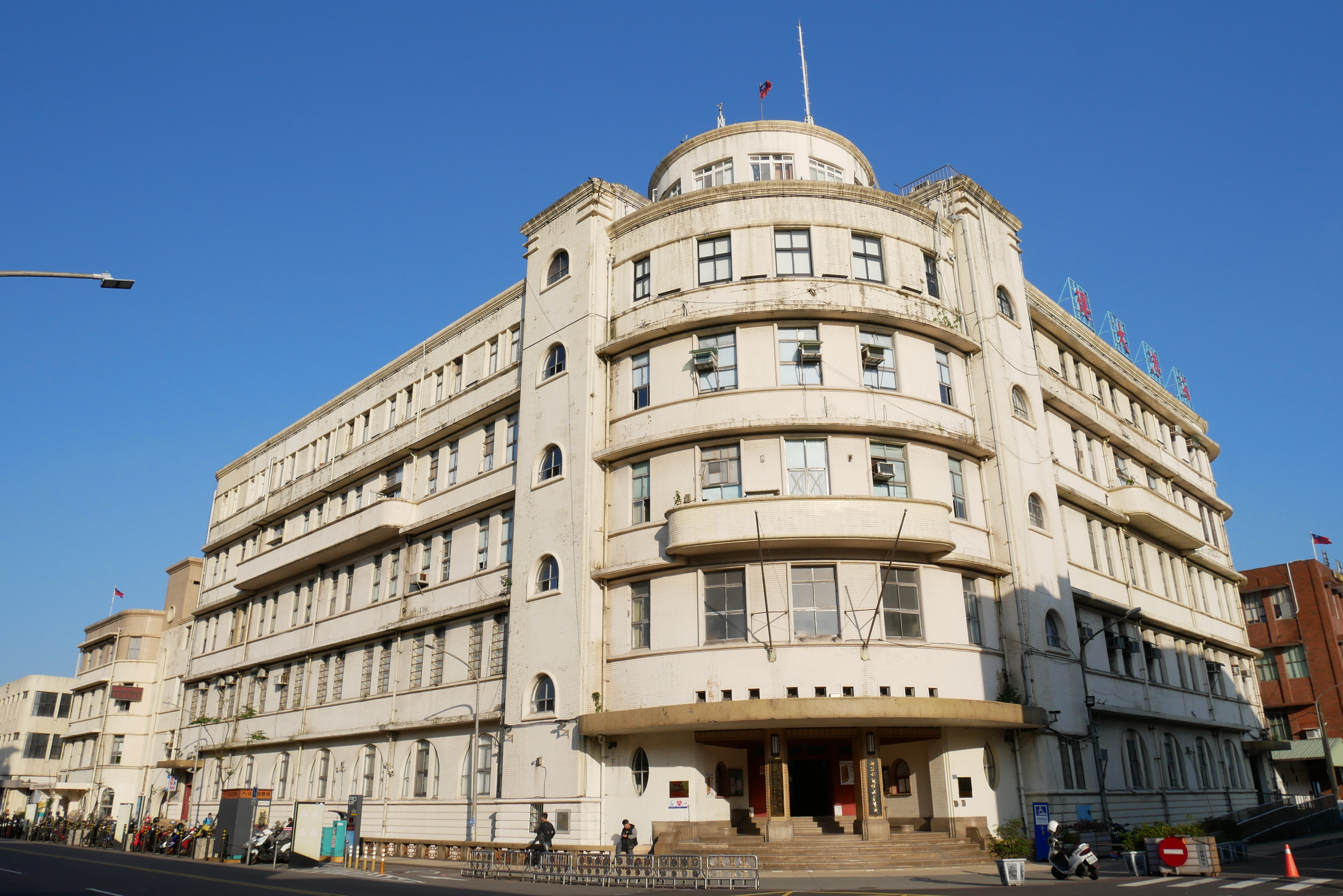
Keelung Harbor Integrated Administration Building (基隆海港大樓), Keelung City (1934)

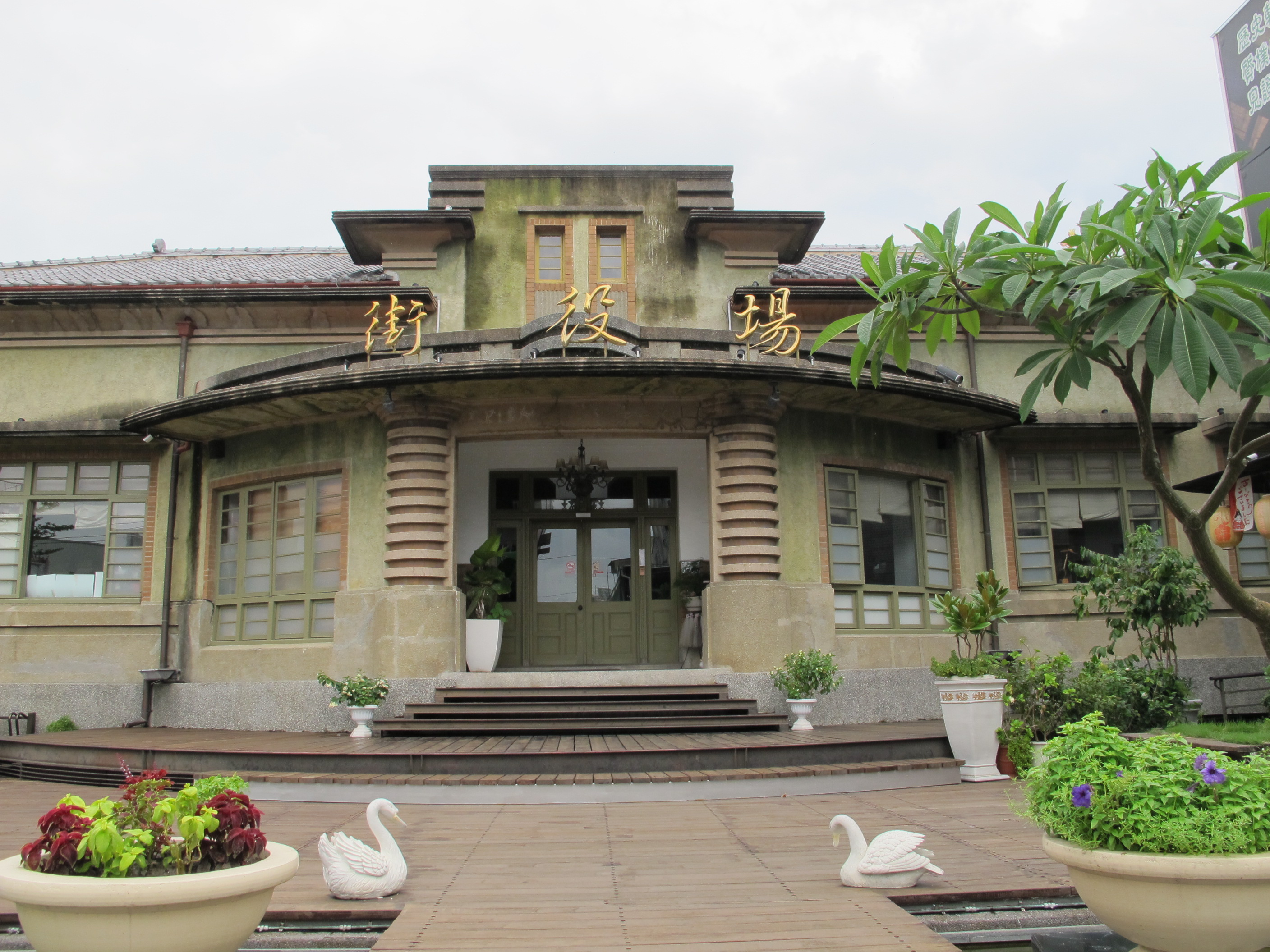
Former Sinhua District Council House (新化街役場), Tainan City (1934)

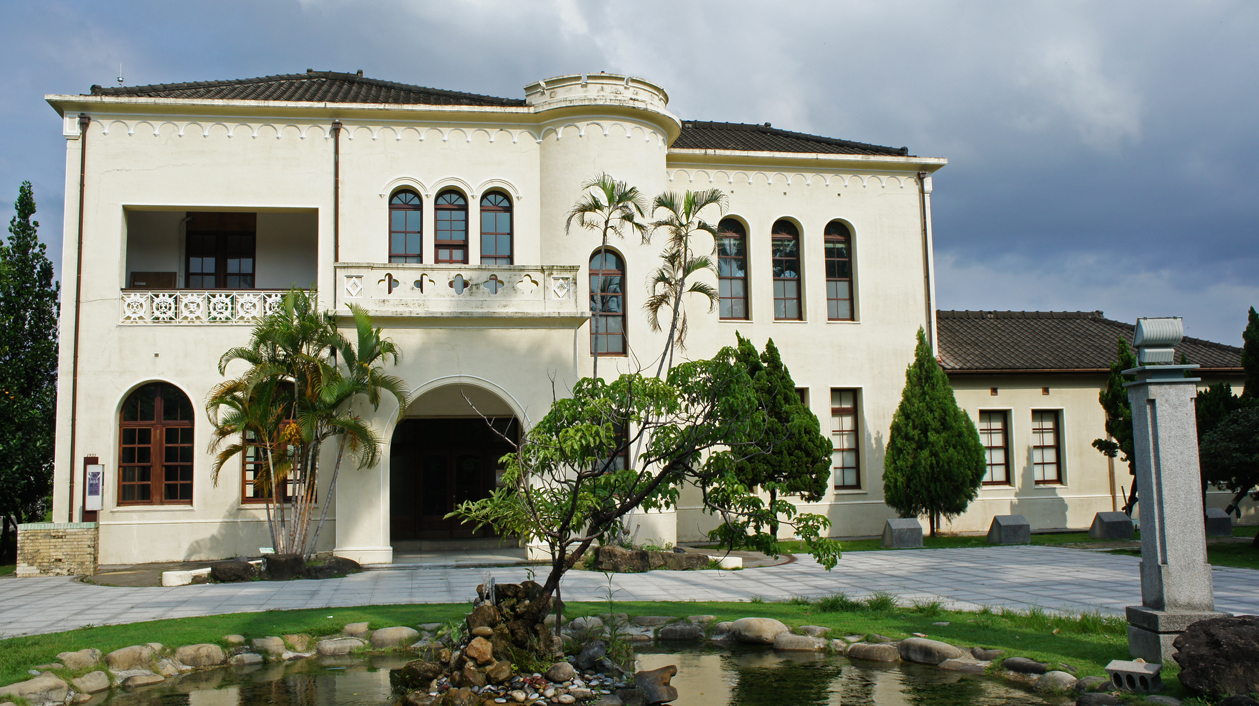
Taichung Broadcasting Bureau, Taichung City

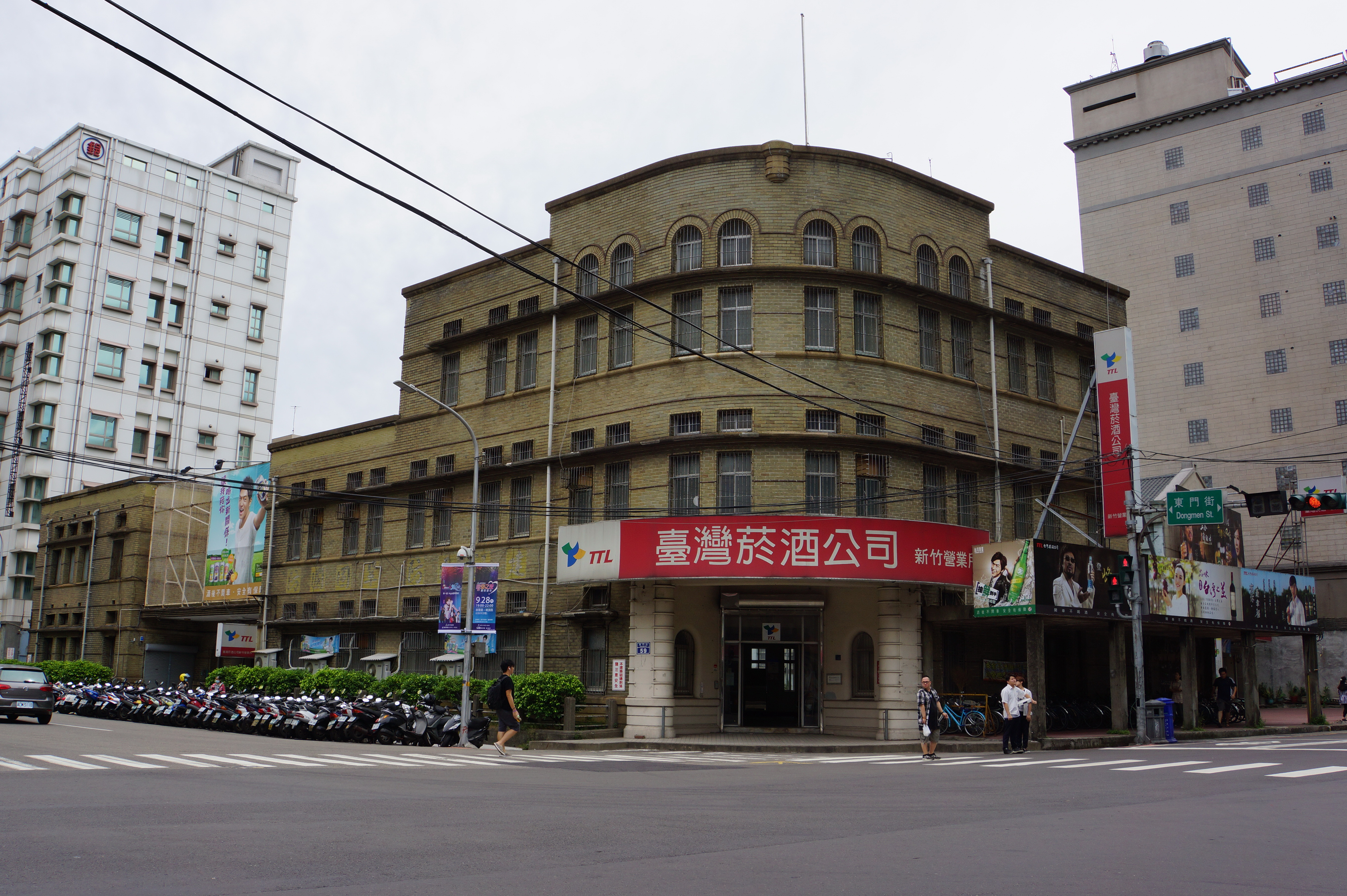
TTL Hsinchu Business Office (臺灣菸酒公司新竹營業所), Hsinchu City (1935)

Kaohsiung Customs, Kaohsiung City (1936)

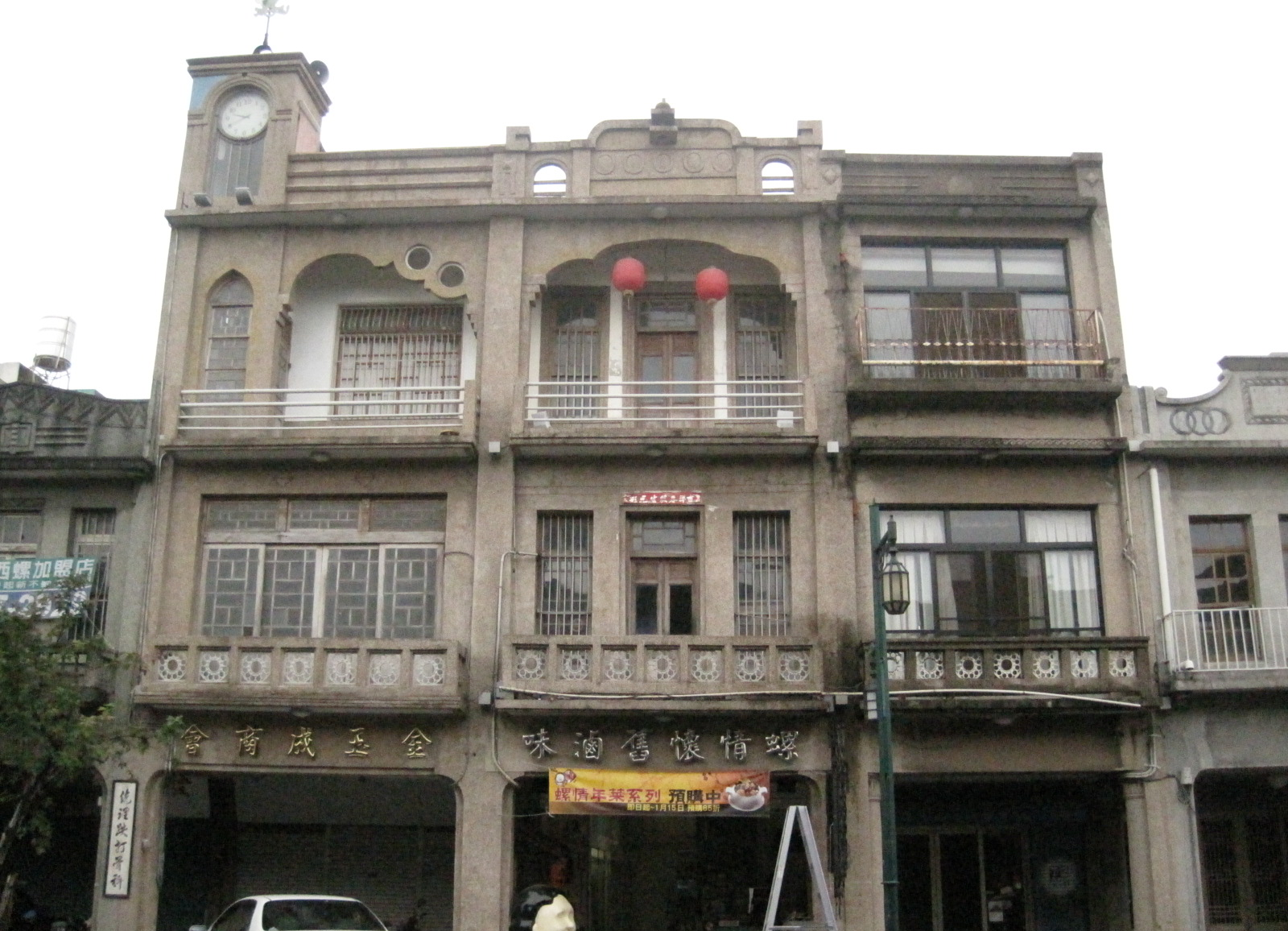
Jin Yu-cheng Clocktower (金玉成鐘樓) in Siluo old street(西螺老街), Yunlin County (1935)

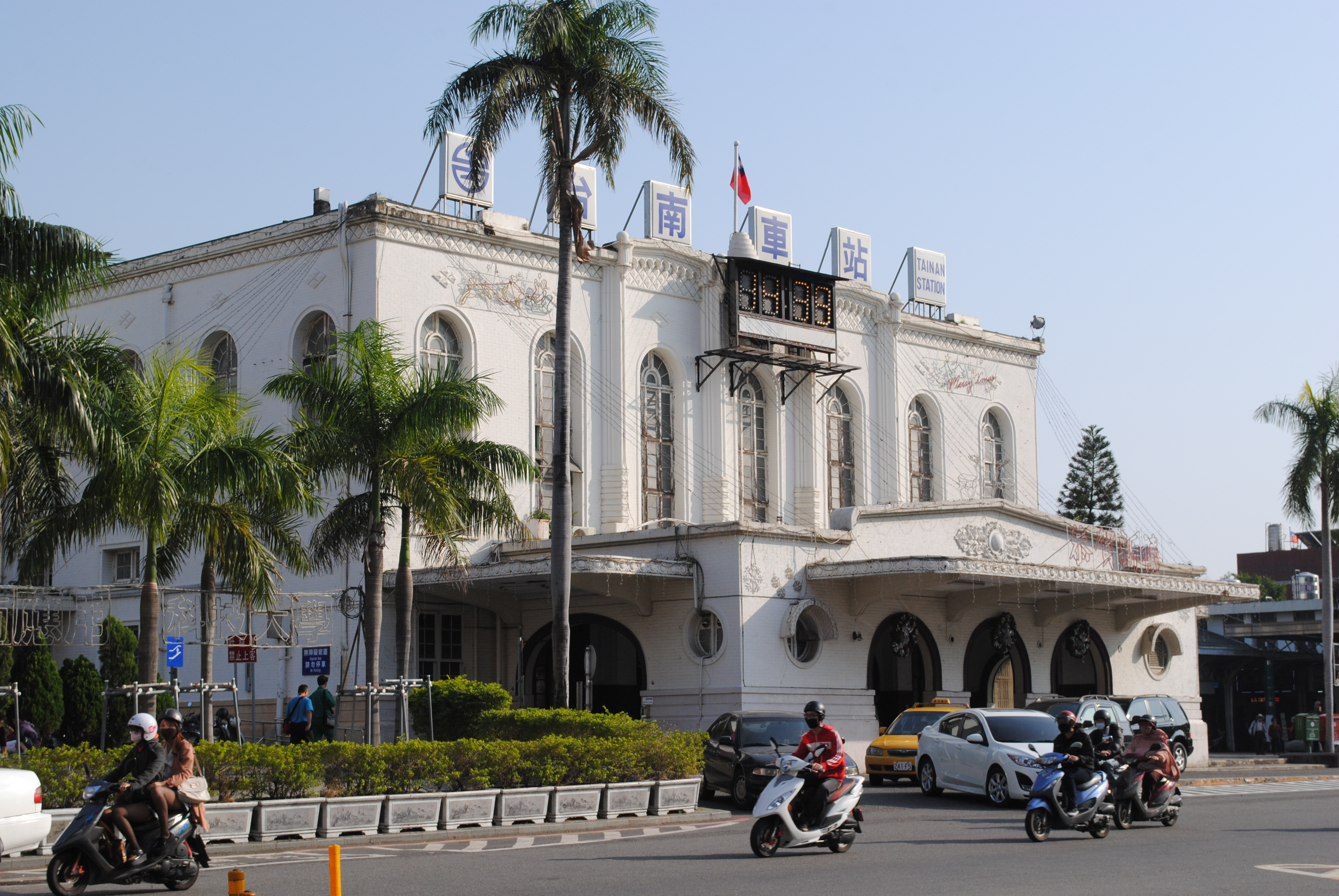
Tainan Railway Station, Tainan City (1936)

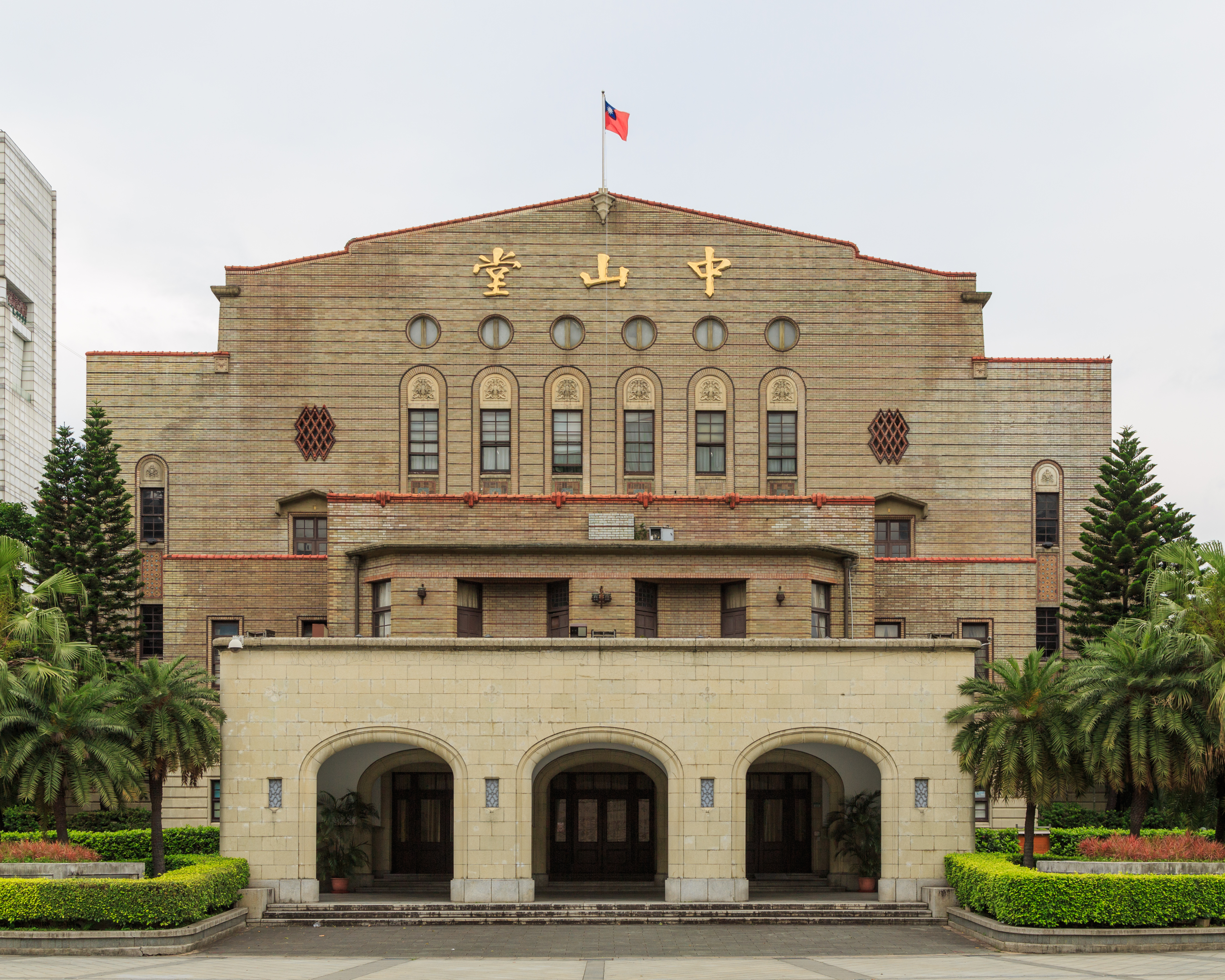
Zhongshan Hall, Taipei City (1936), designed by Ide Kaoru

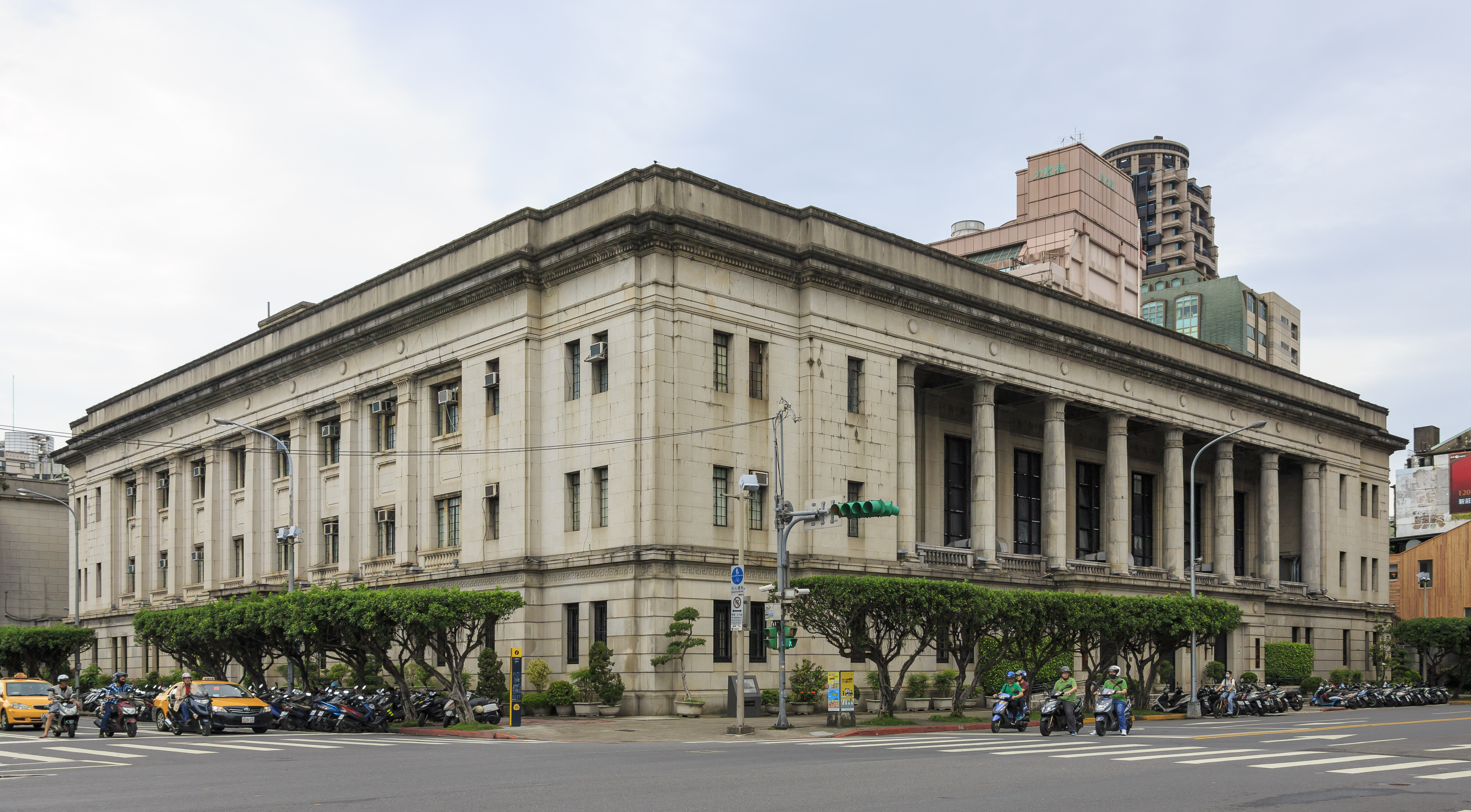
Bank of Taiwan, Taipei City (1938)

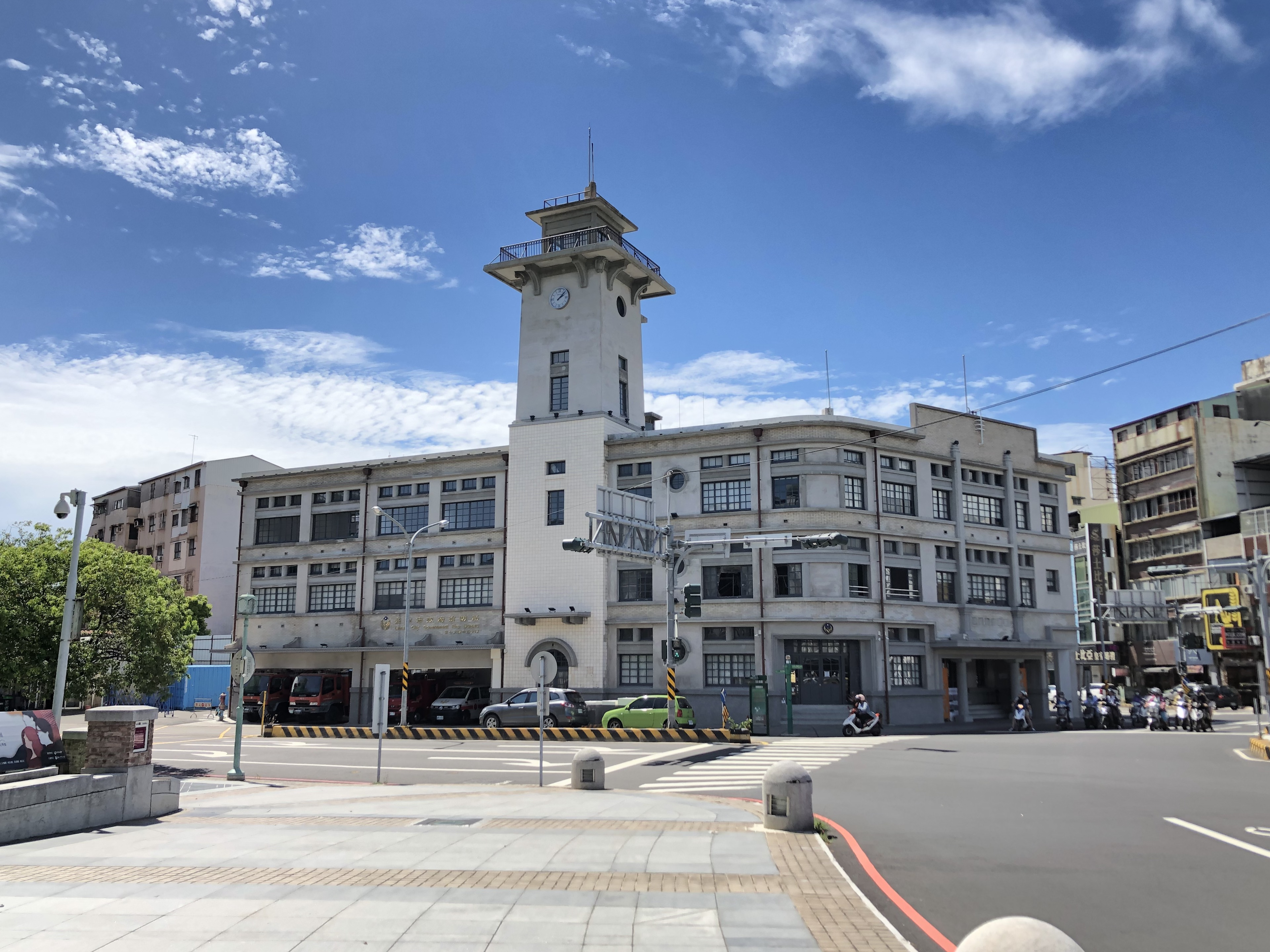
Tainan City Fire Bureau Second Division, Tainan City (1938)

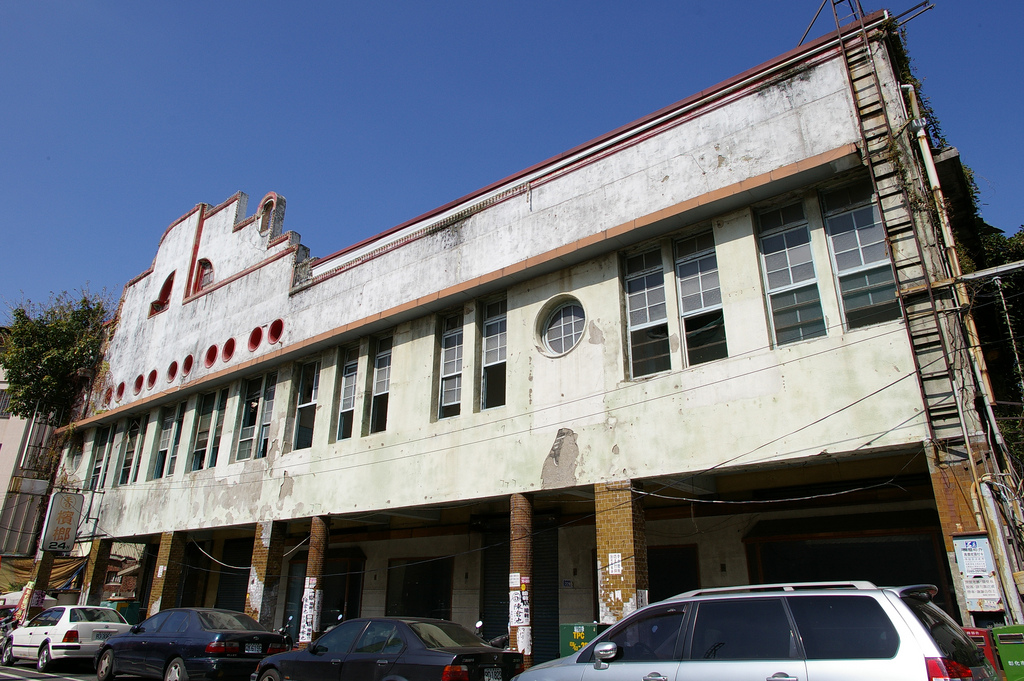
Changhua Railway Hospital, Changhua County (1938)

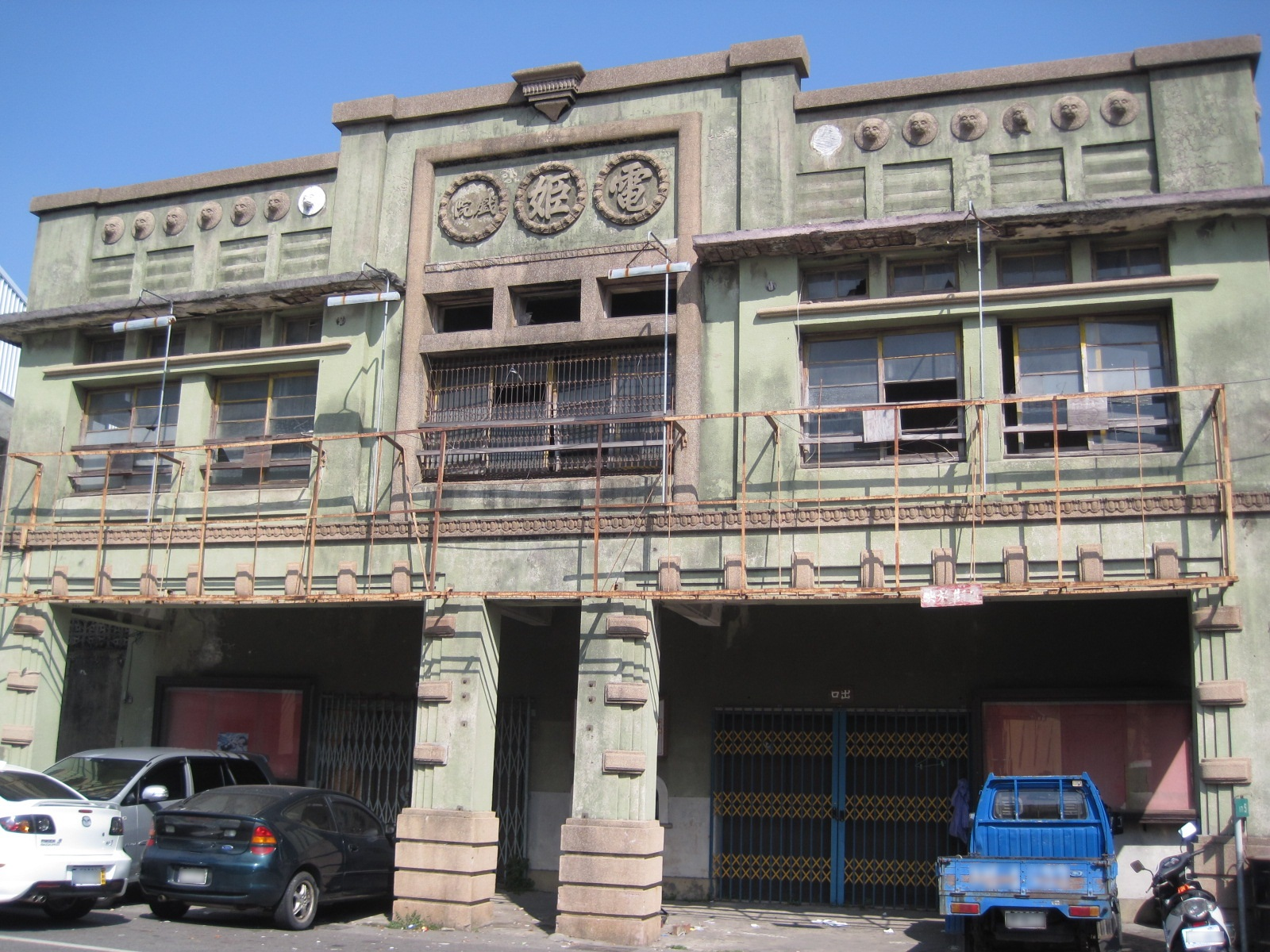
Dianji Theater (電姬戲院), Tainan City (1938)

Traditional Taiwanese and Taiwanese-Western Eclectic Architecture

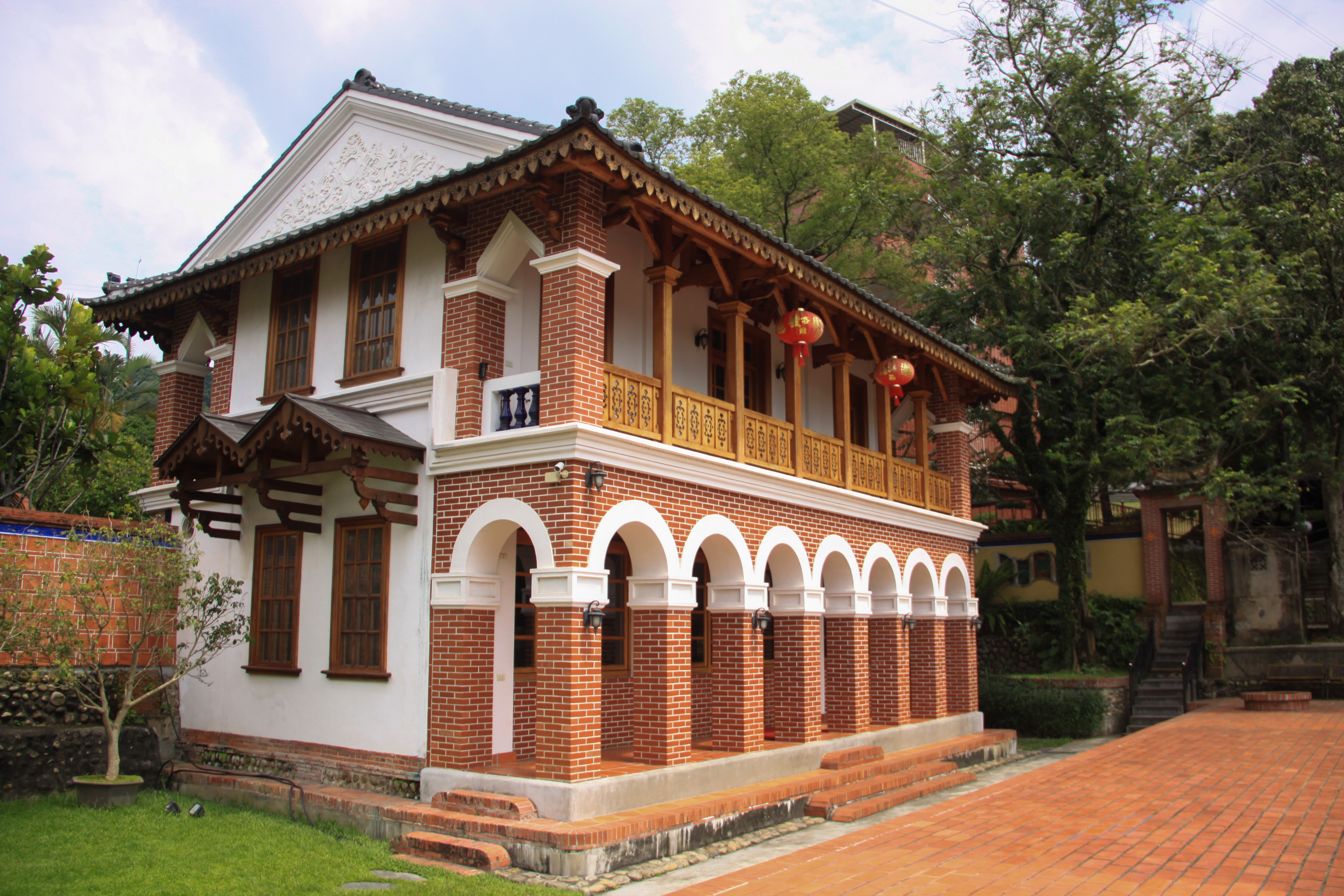
Five-Cassia Tower (五桂樓) in Wufeng Lin Family Mansion and Garden, Taichung City (1906)

Tamsui Theater (淡水戲館), Taipei City (1909)

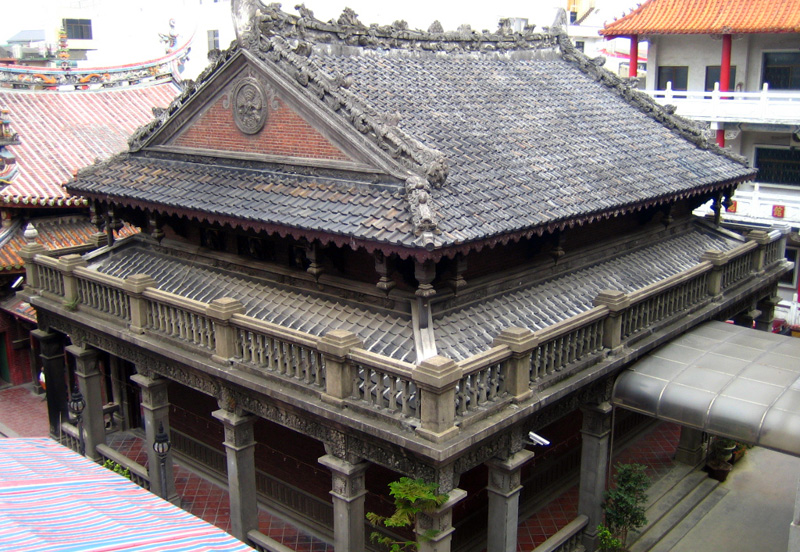
Nanyao Temple, Changhua County (1916)

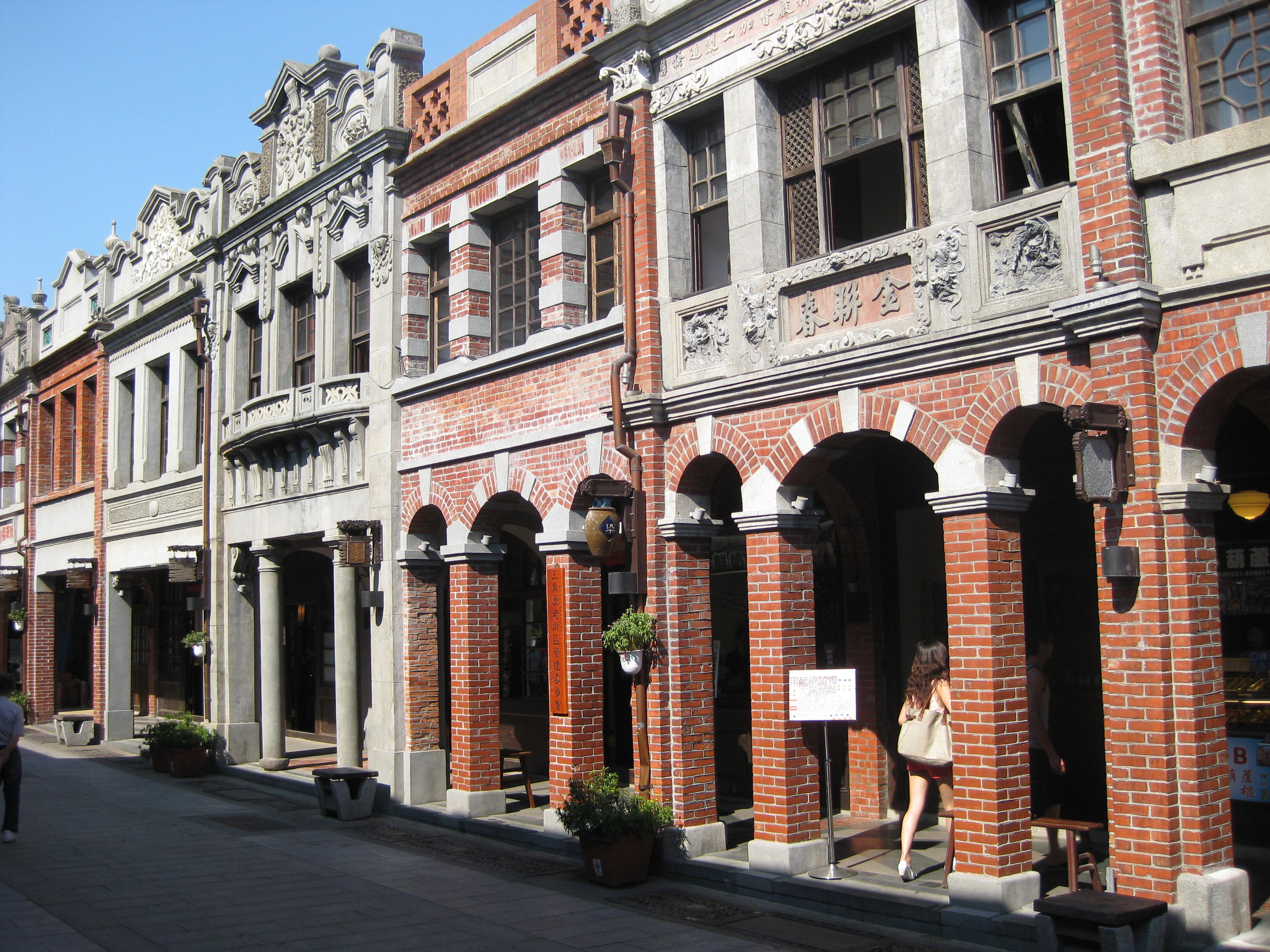
Sanxia Old Street, New Taipei City (1916)

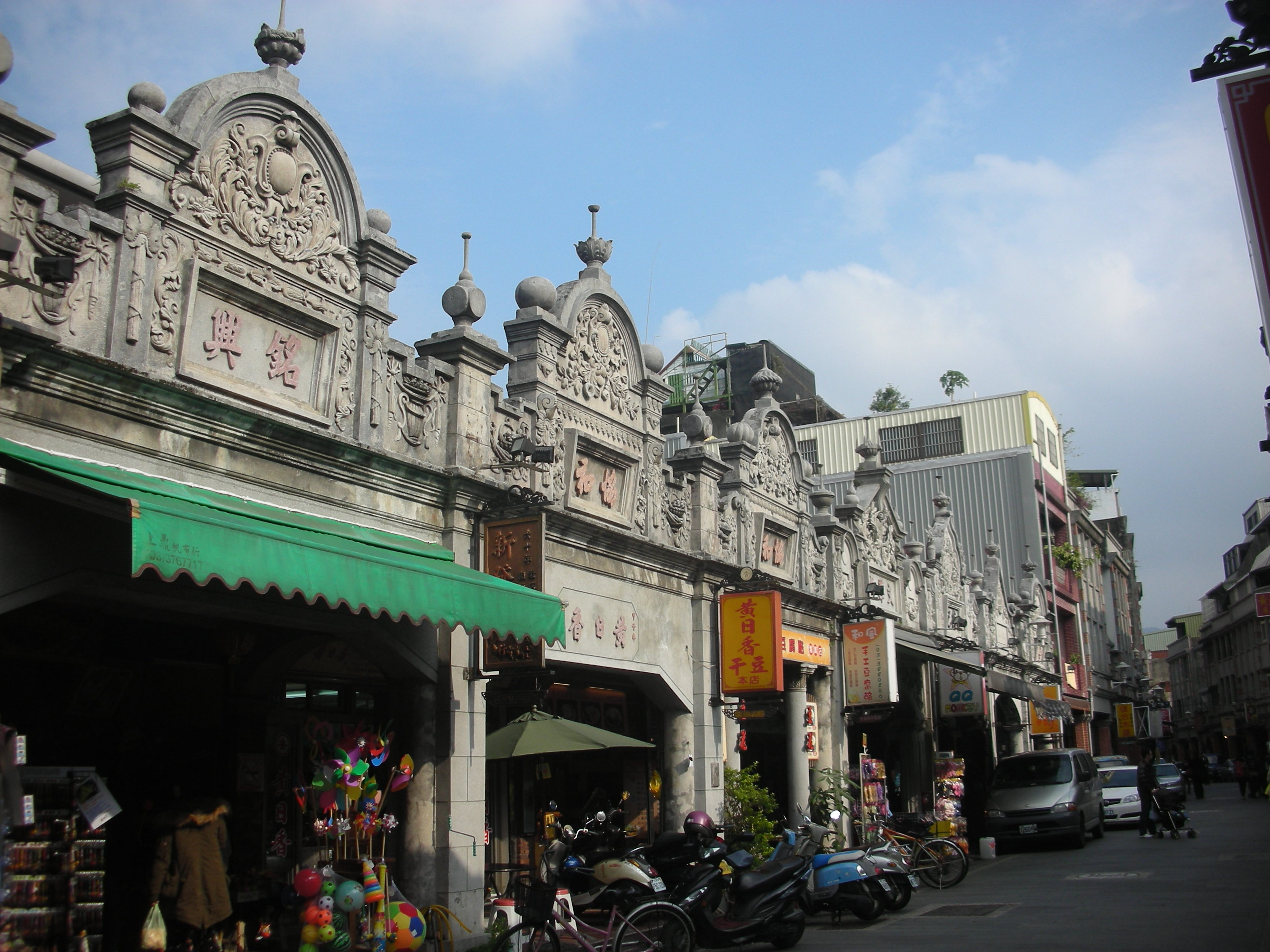
Daxi Old Street, Taoyuan City (1918–1919)

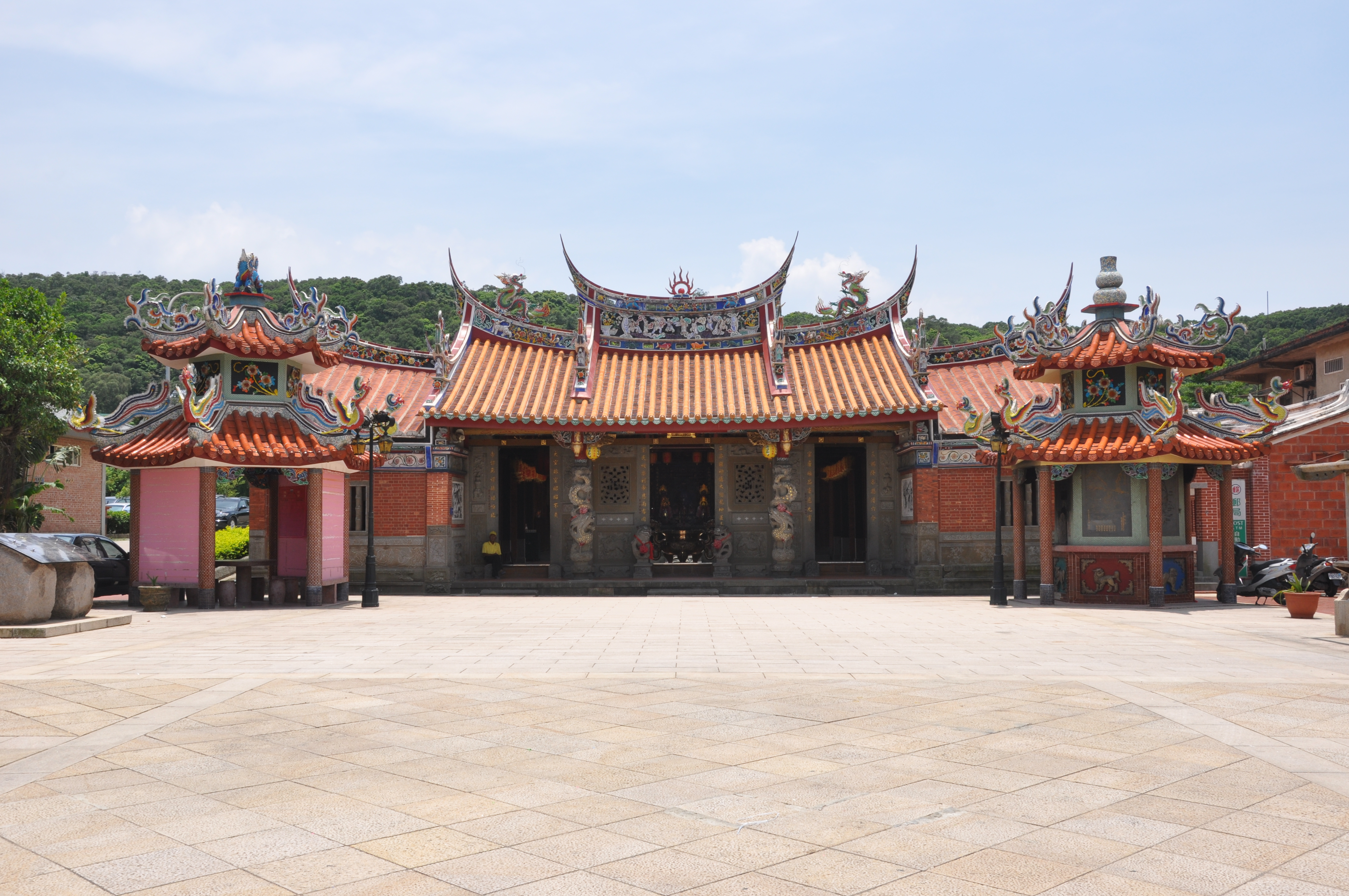
Hukou Sanyuan Temple (湖口三元宮), Hsinchu County (1919)

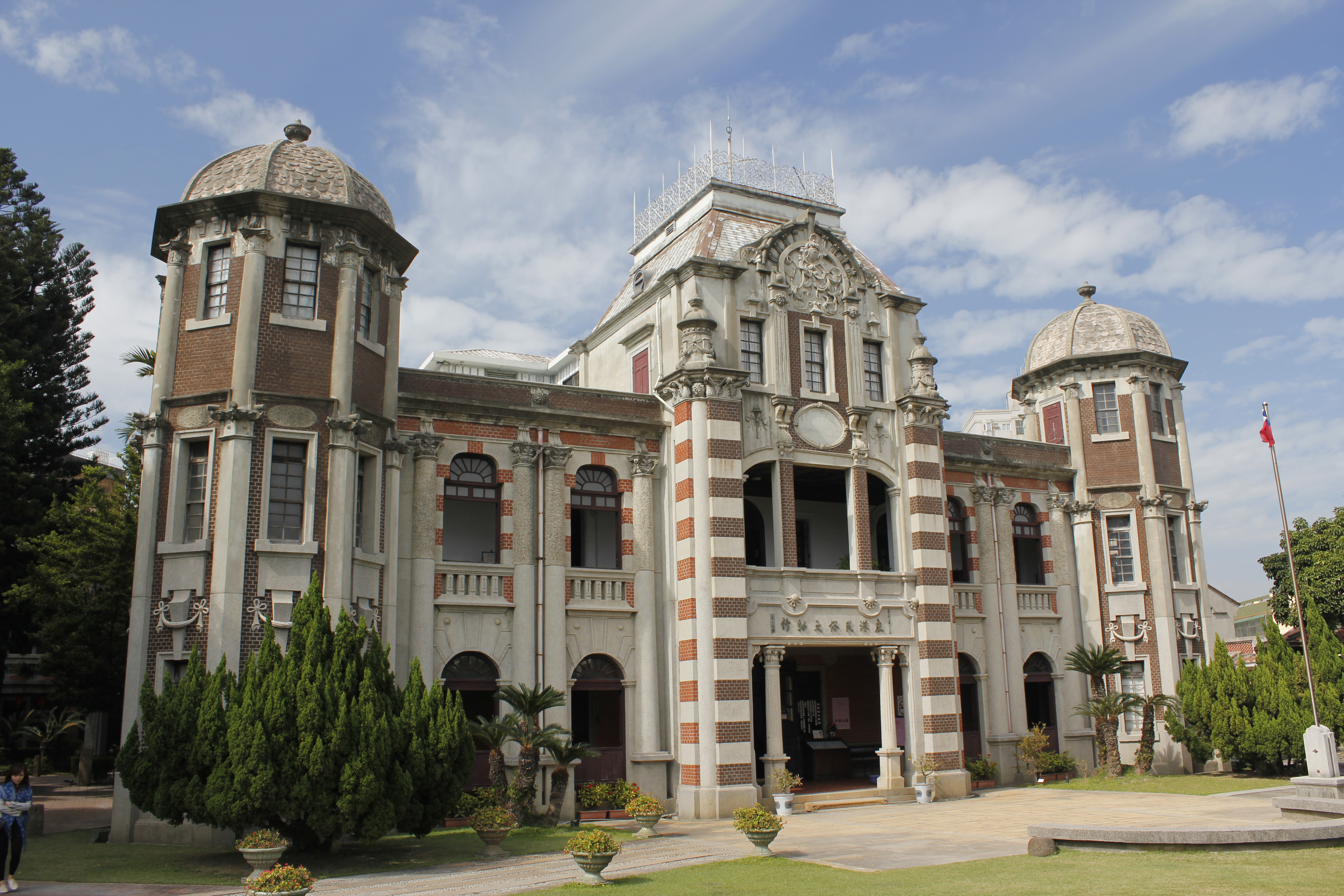
Lukang Folk Arts Museum, Changhua County (1919)

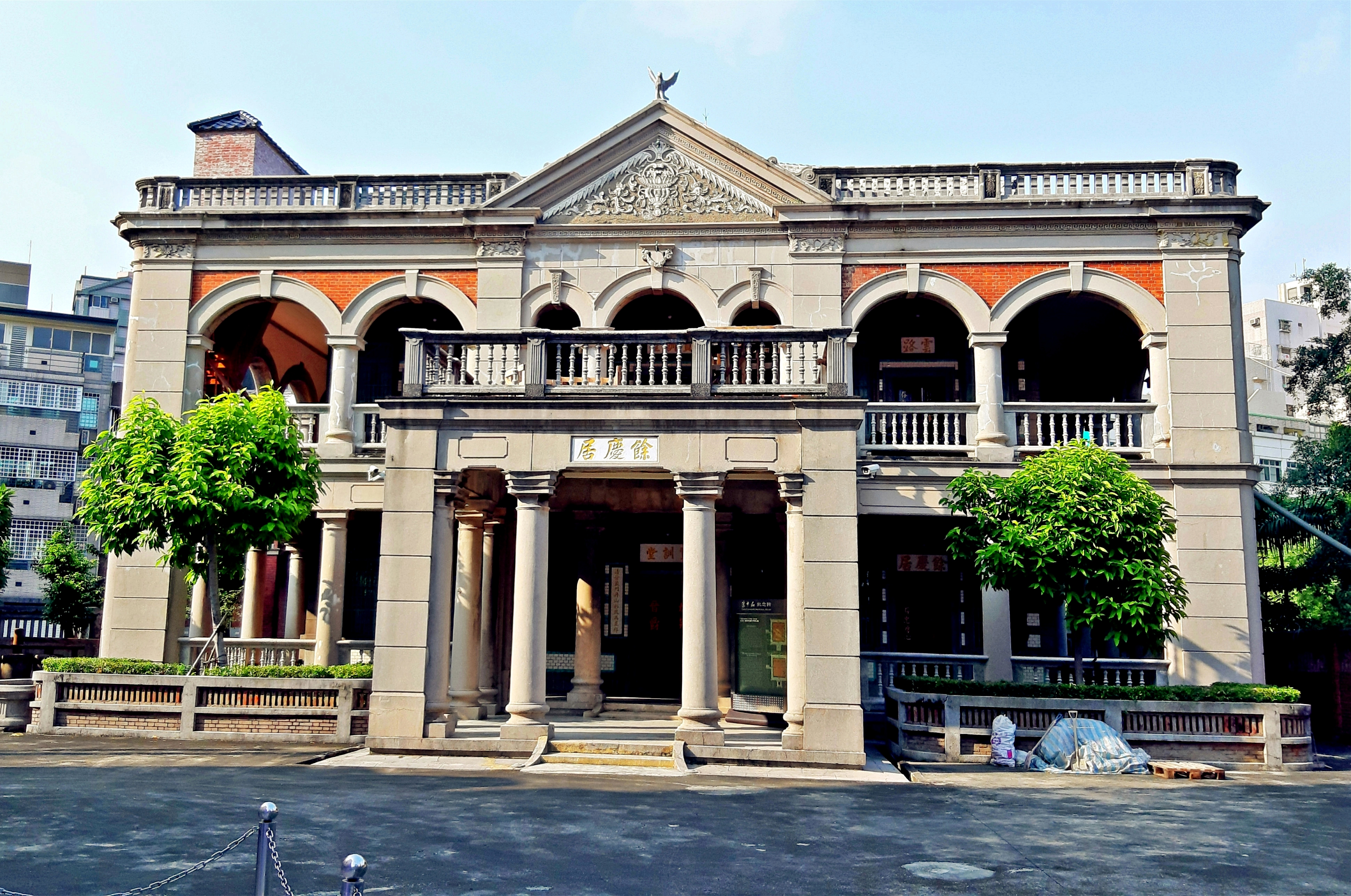
Chen Jhong-he Memorial Hall, Kaohsiung City (1920)

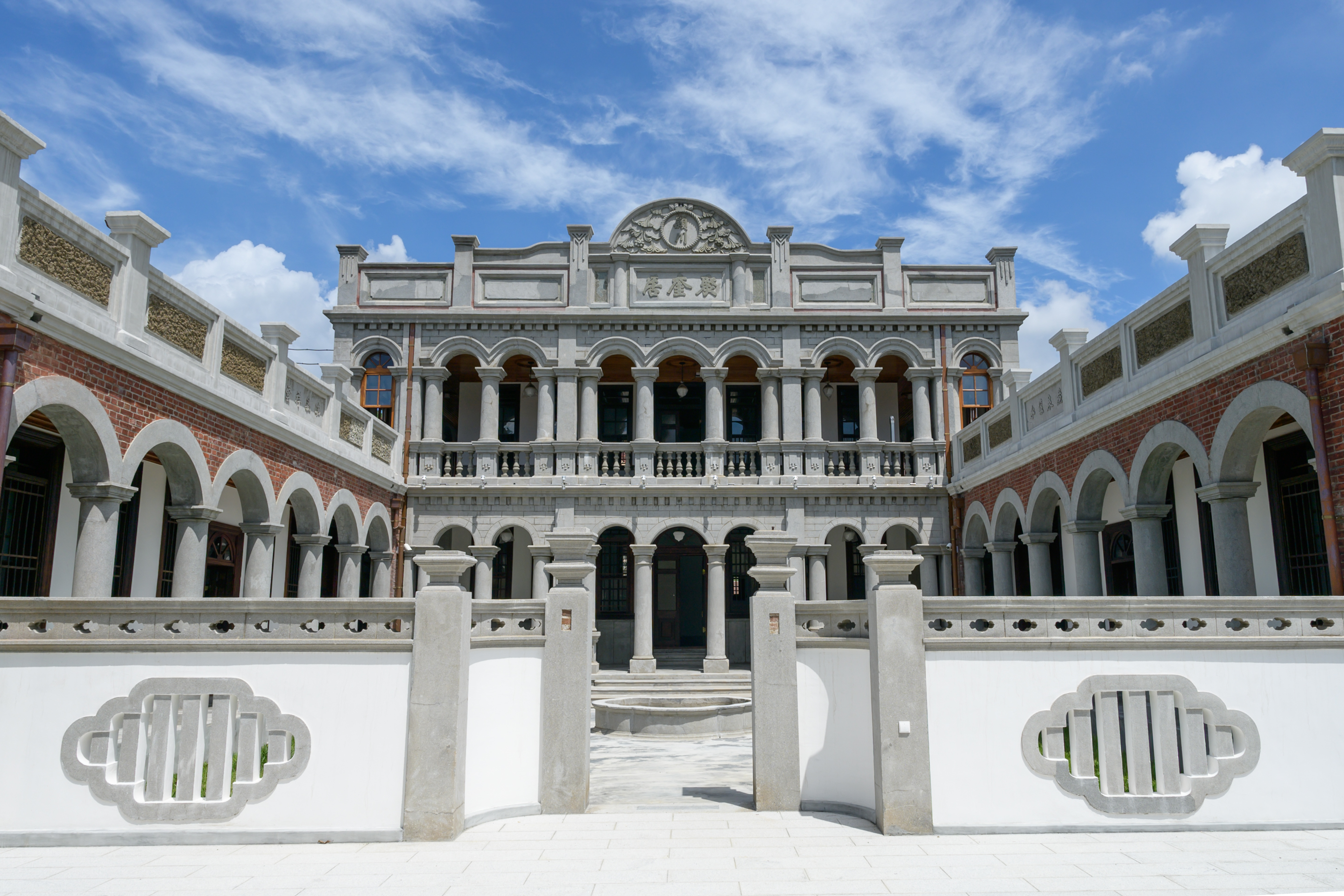
Jukuiju Mansion (聚奎居), Taichung City (1920)

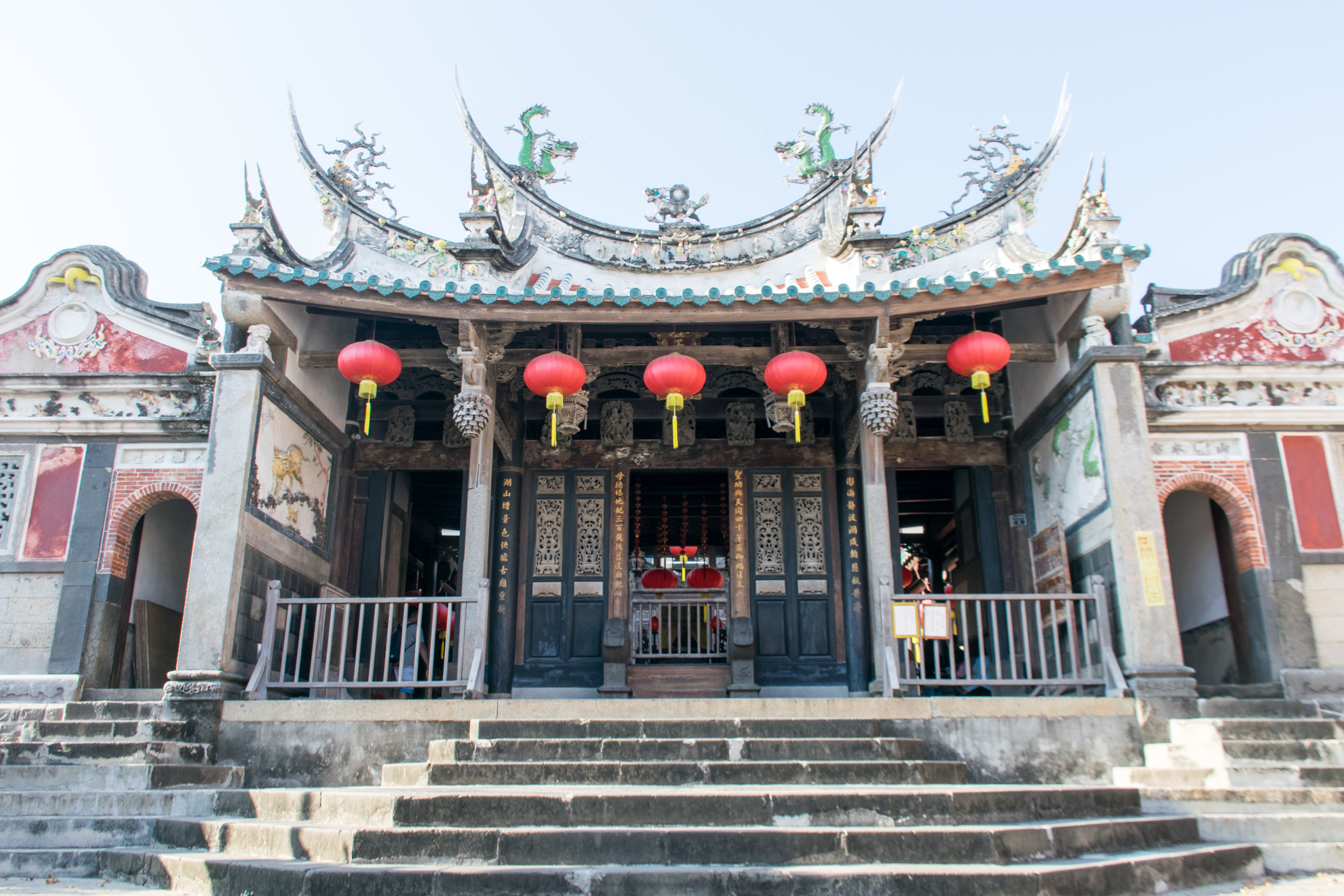
Penghu Tianhou Temple, Penghu County (1923)

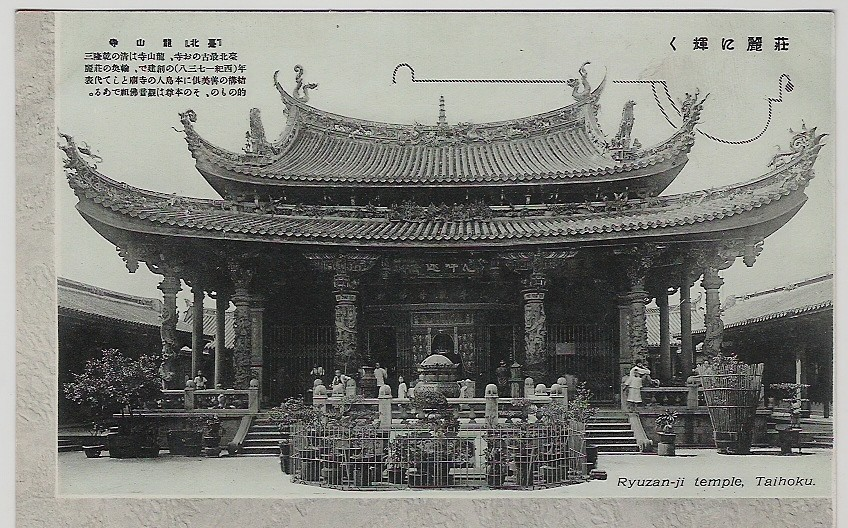
Bangka Lungshan Temple, Taipei City (1924)

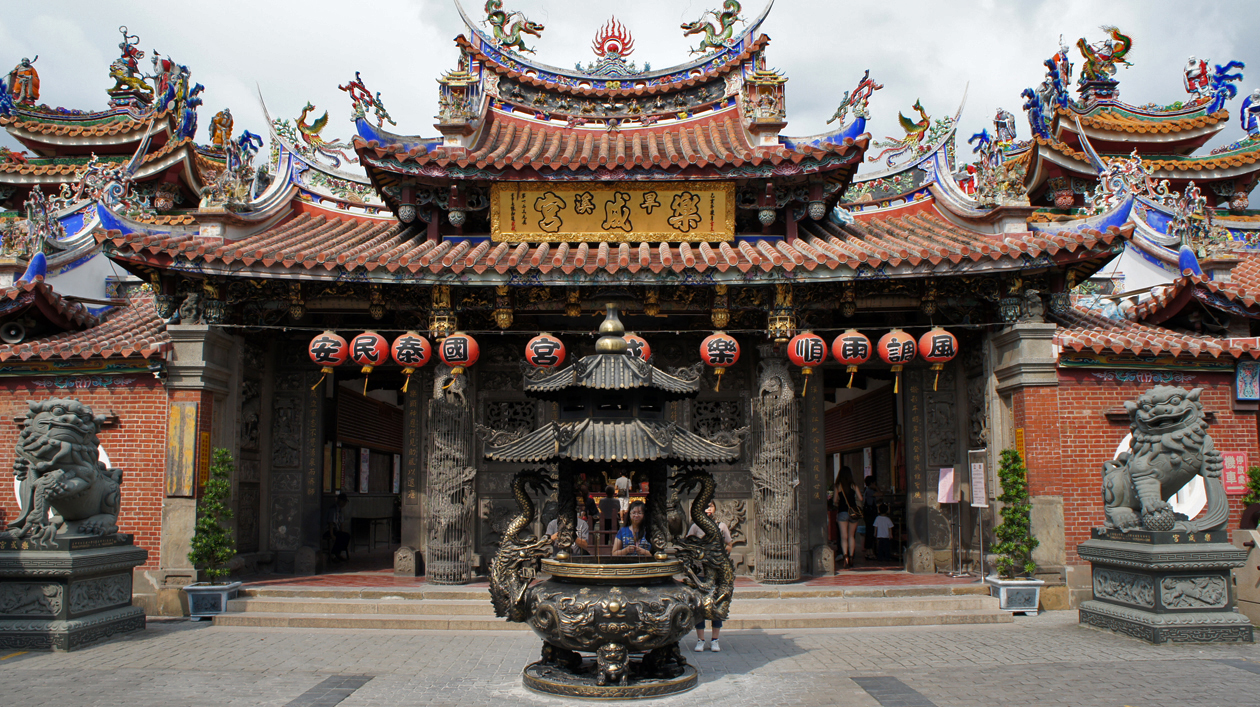
Lecheng Temple, Taichung City (1790), restored in 1920s.

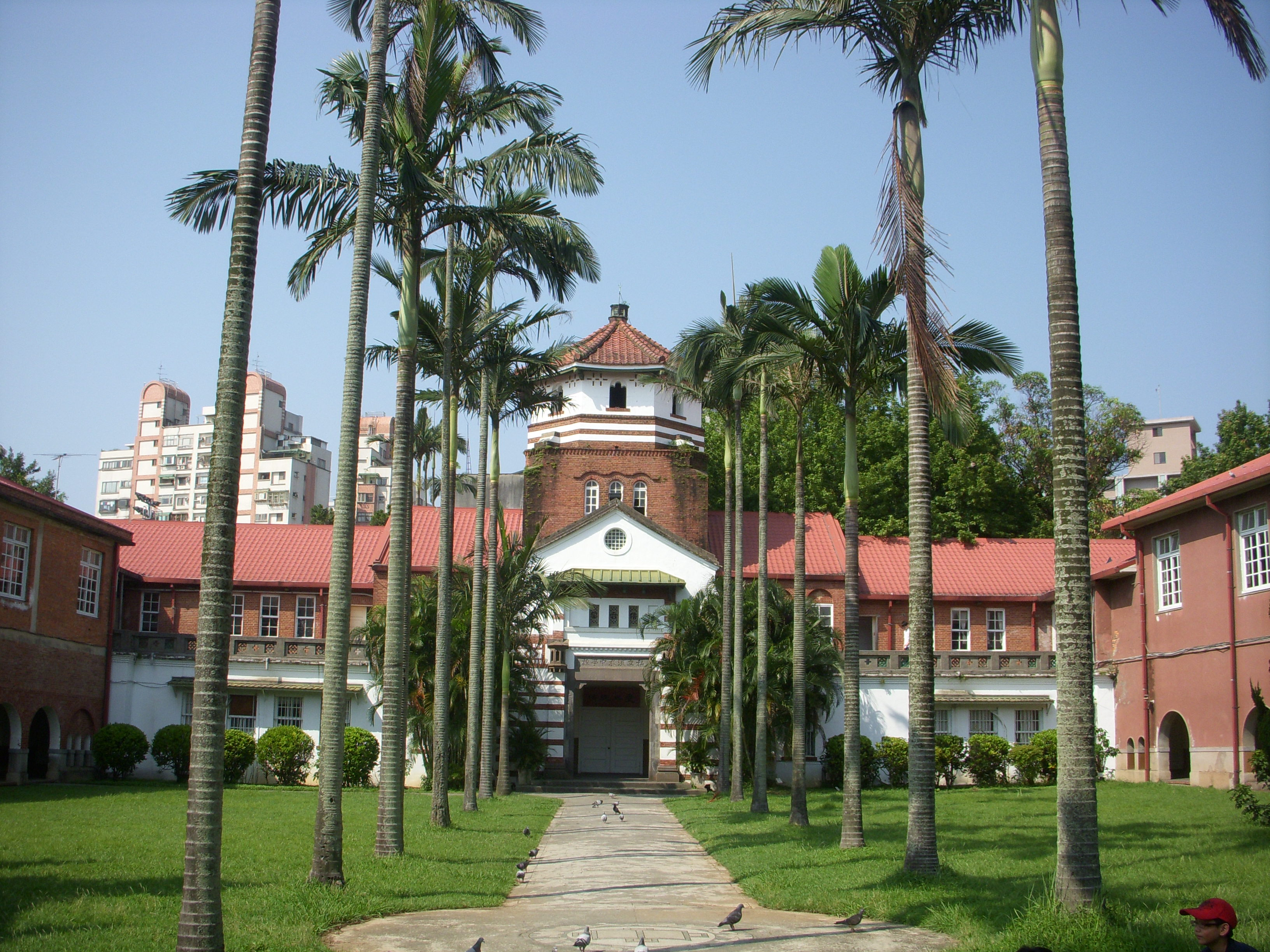
Octagonal Tower of Tamkang High School (淡江中學八角塔), New Taipei City (1924)

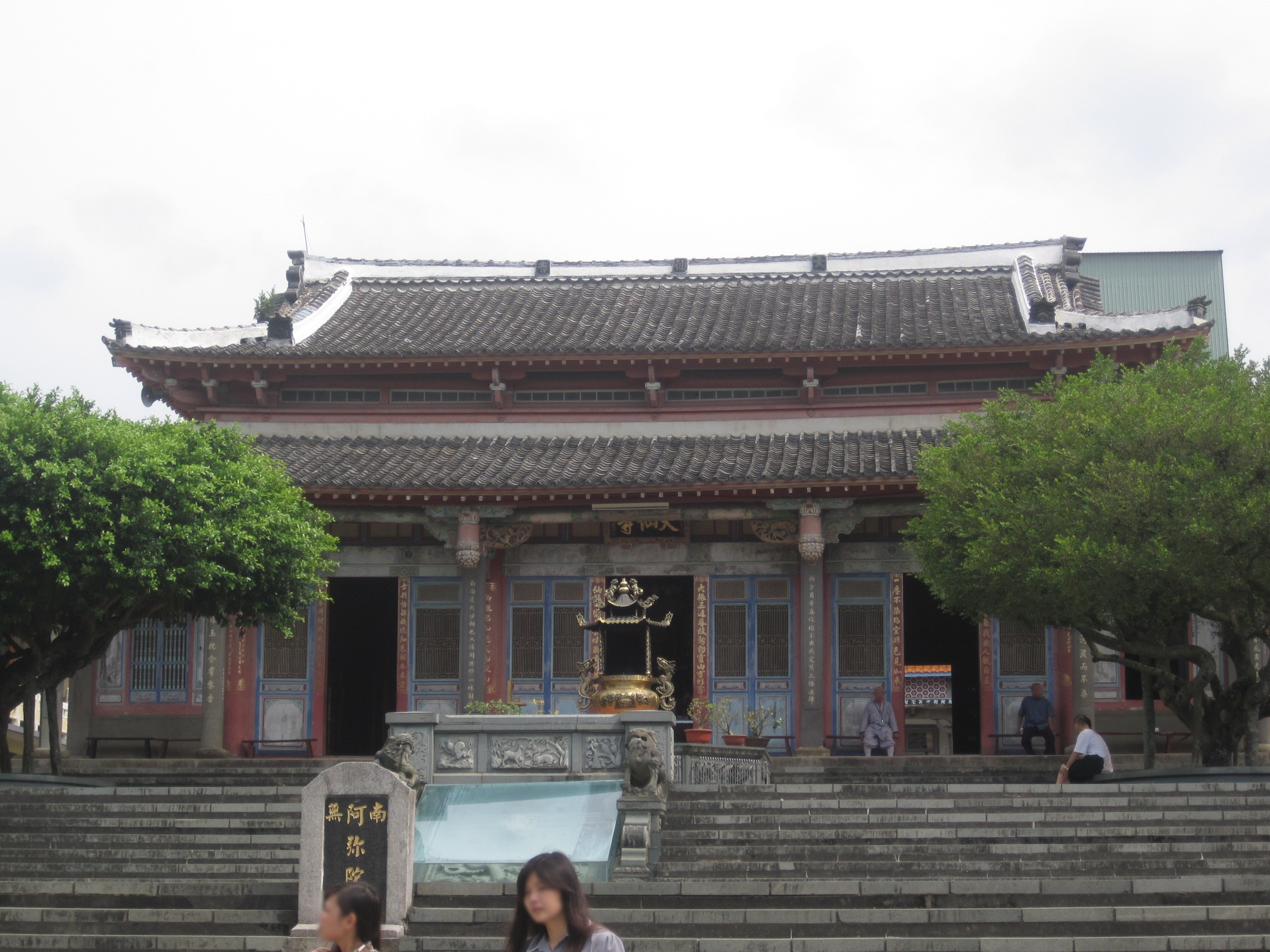
Dasian Temple (大仙寺), Tainan City (1925)

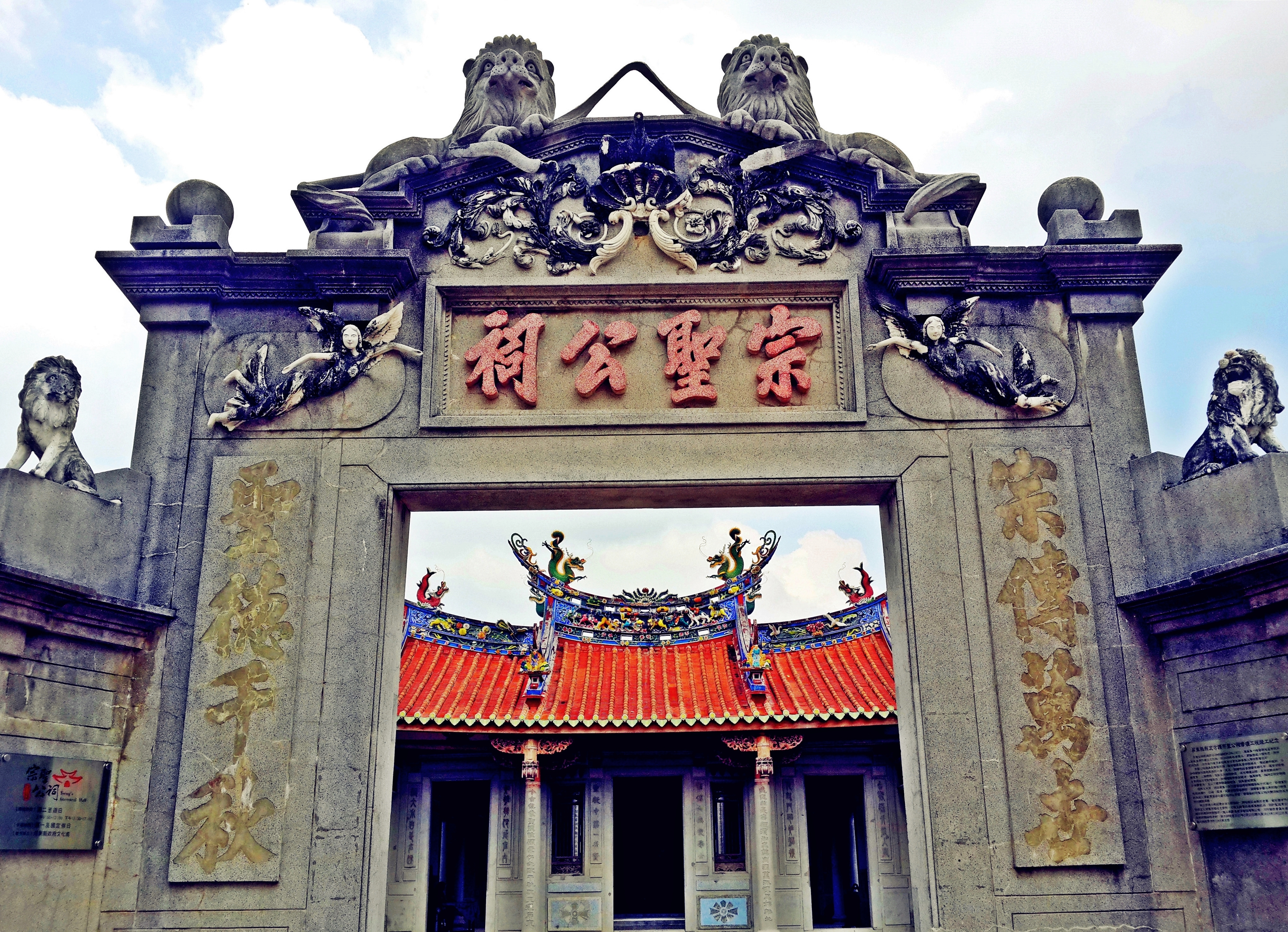
Zhong Sheng Gong Memorial (宗聖公祠), Pingtung County (1929)

Japanese-style and Japanese-Western Eclectic Architecture

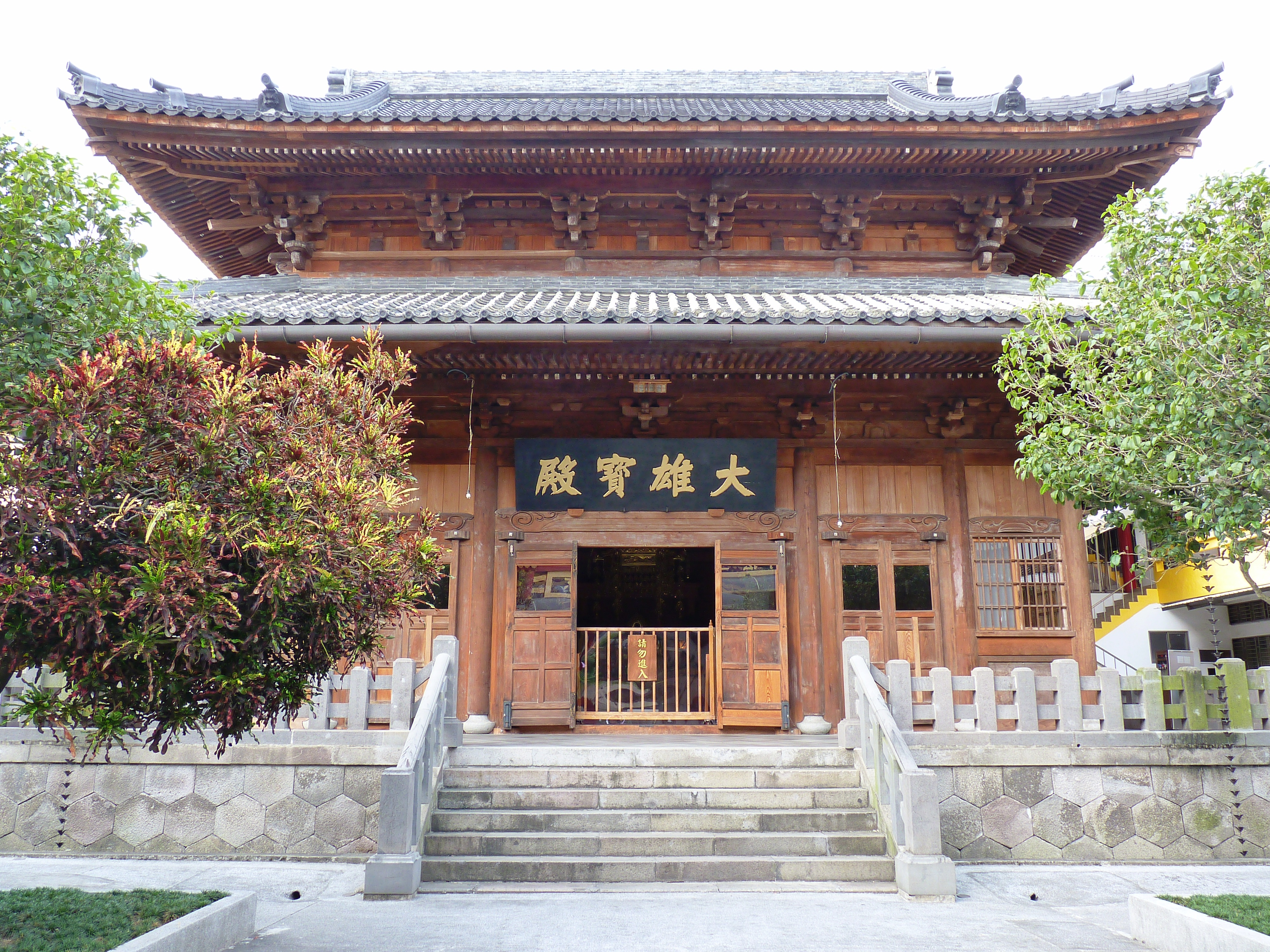
Linji Huguo Chan Temple, Taipei City (1911)

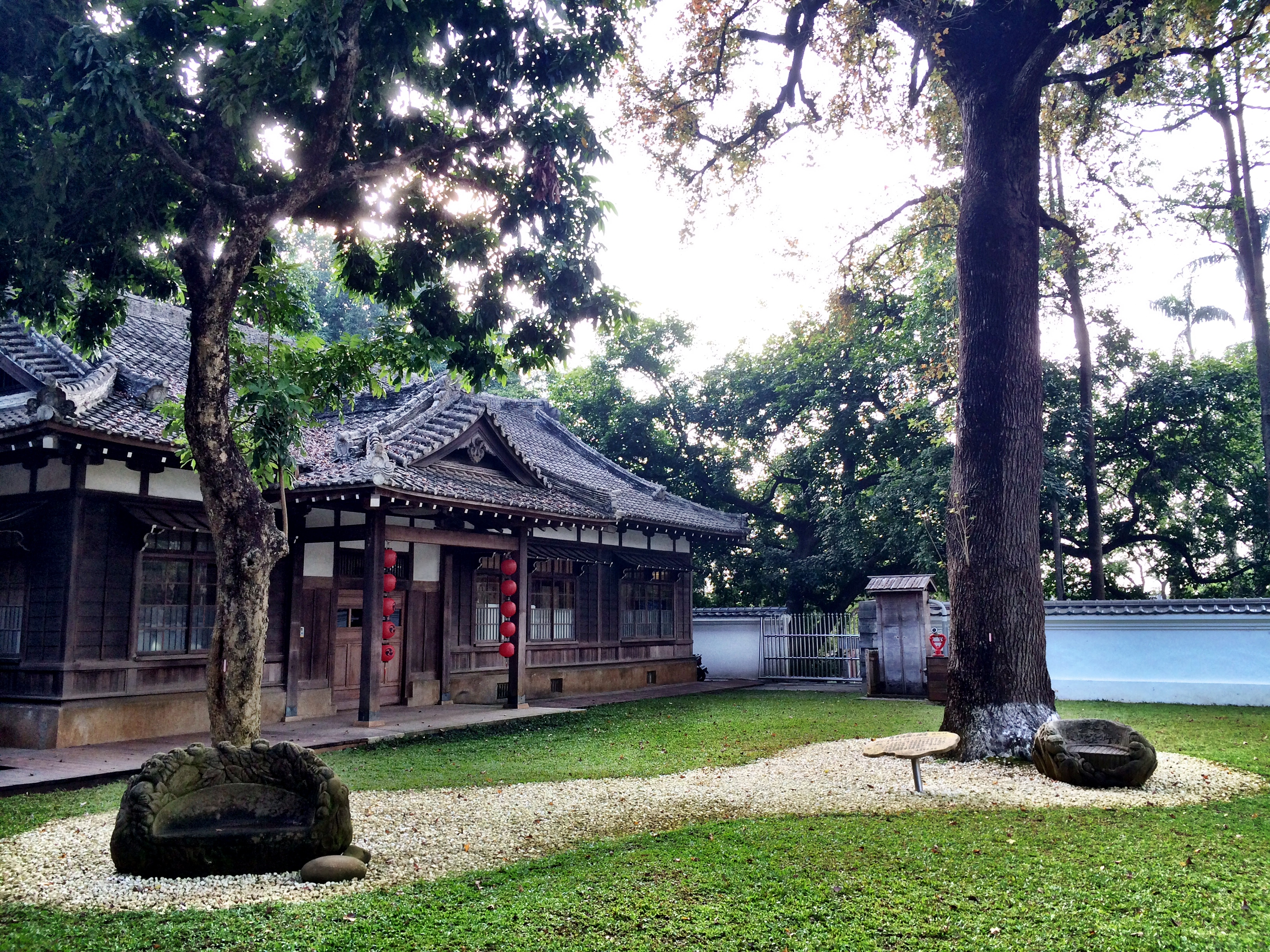
Former Kagi Shrine administration building, Chiayi City (1915)

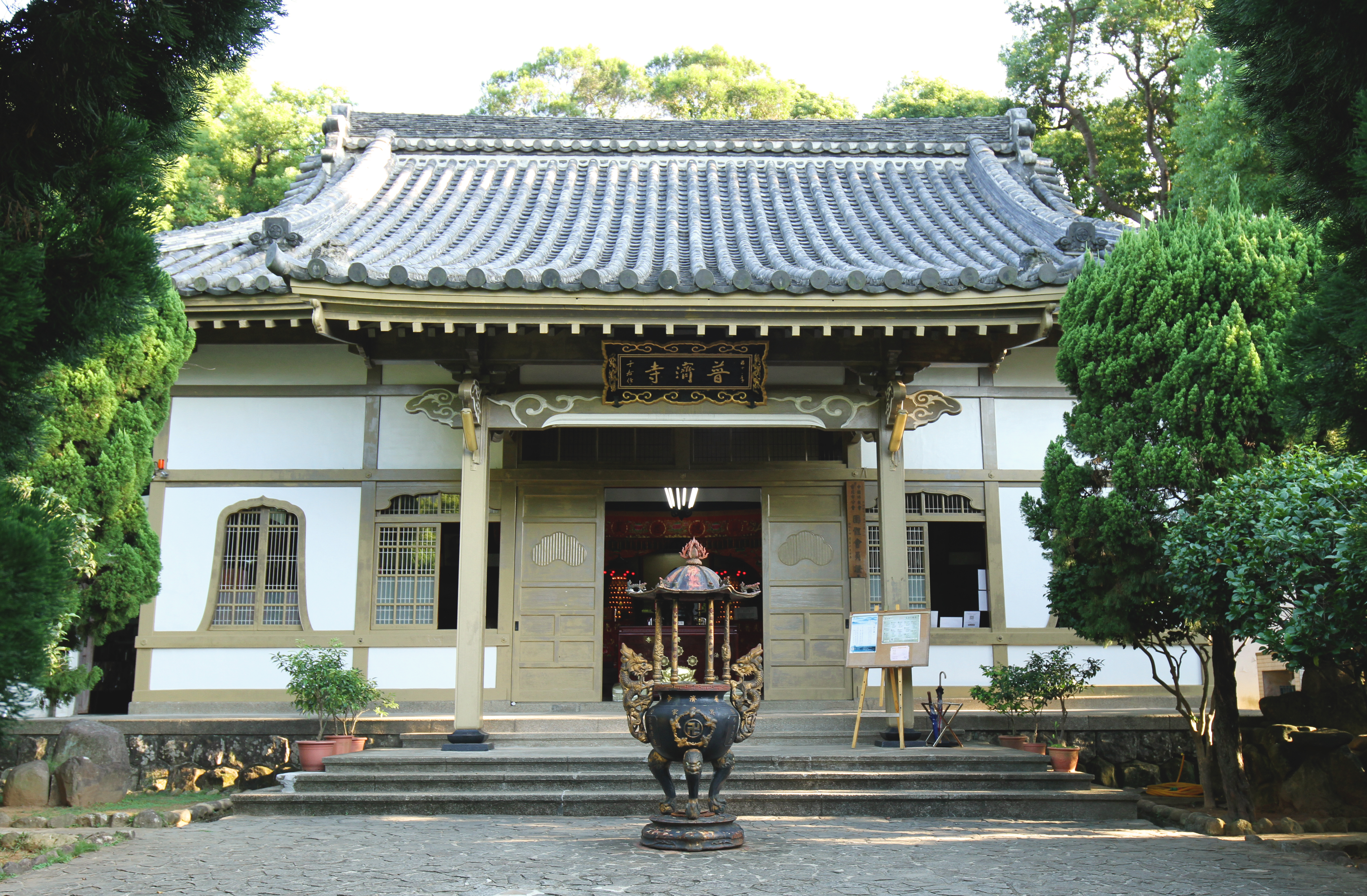
Beitou Puji Temple(北投普濟寺), Taipei City (1915)

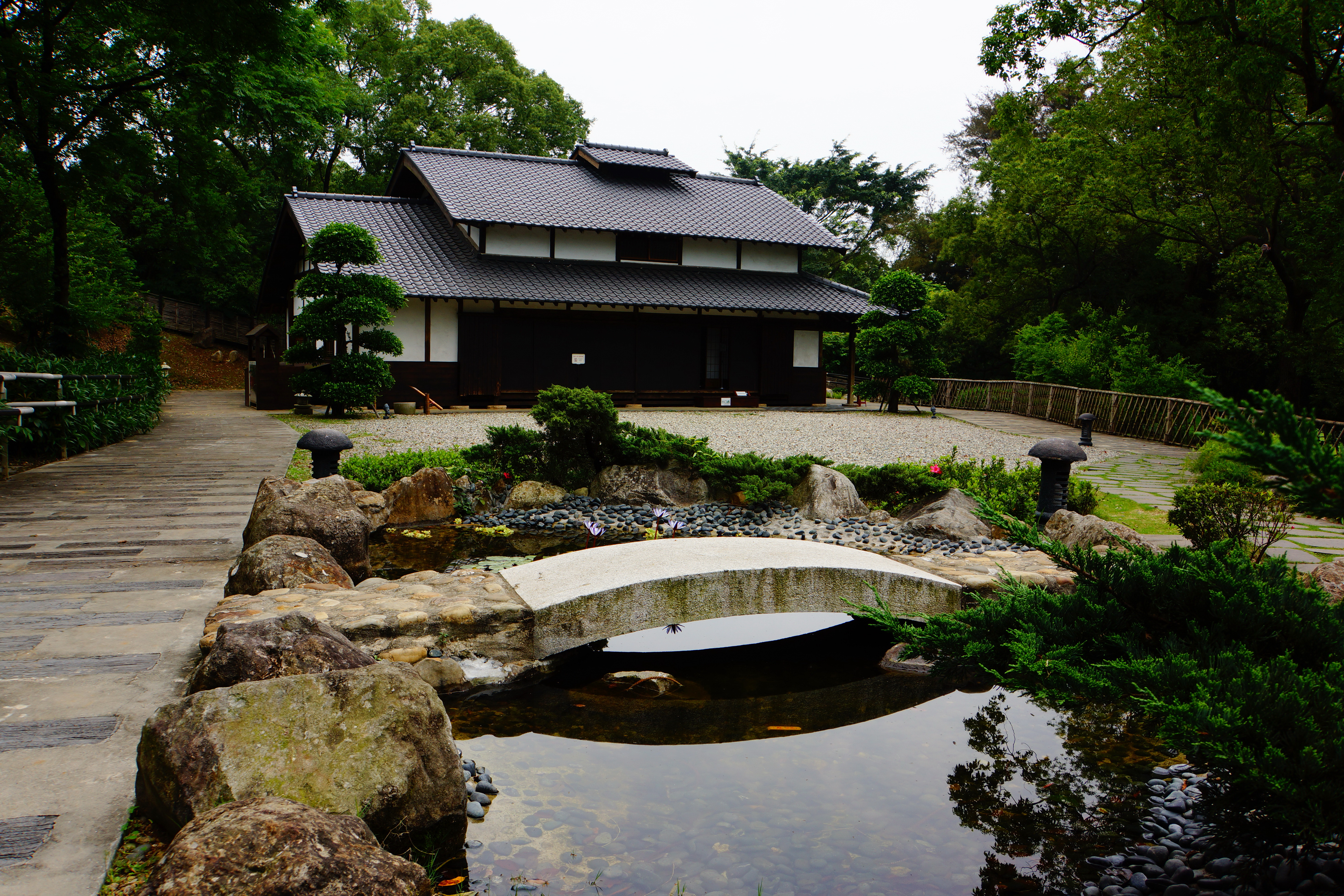
The Drop of Water Memorial Hall, New Taipei City (1915), this building was dismantled in Japan and rebuilt in Taiwan.

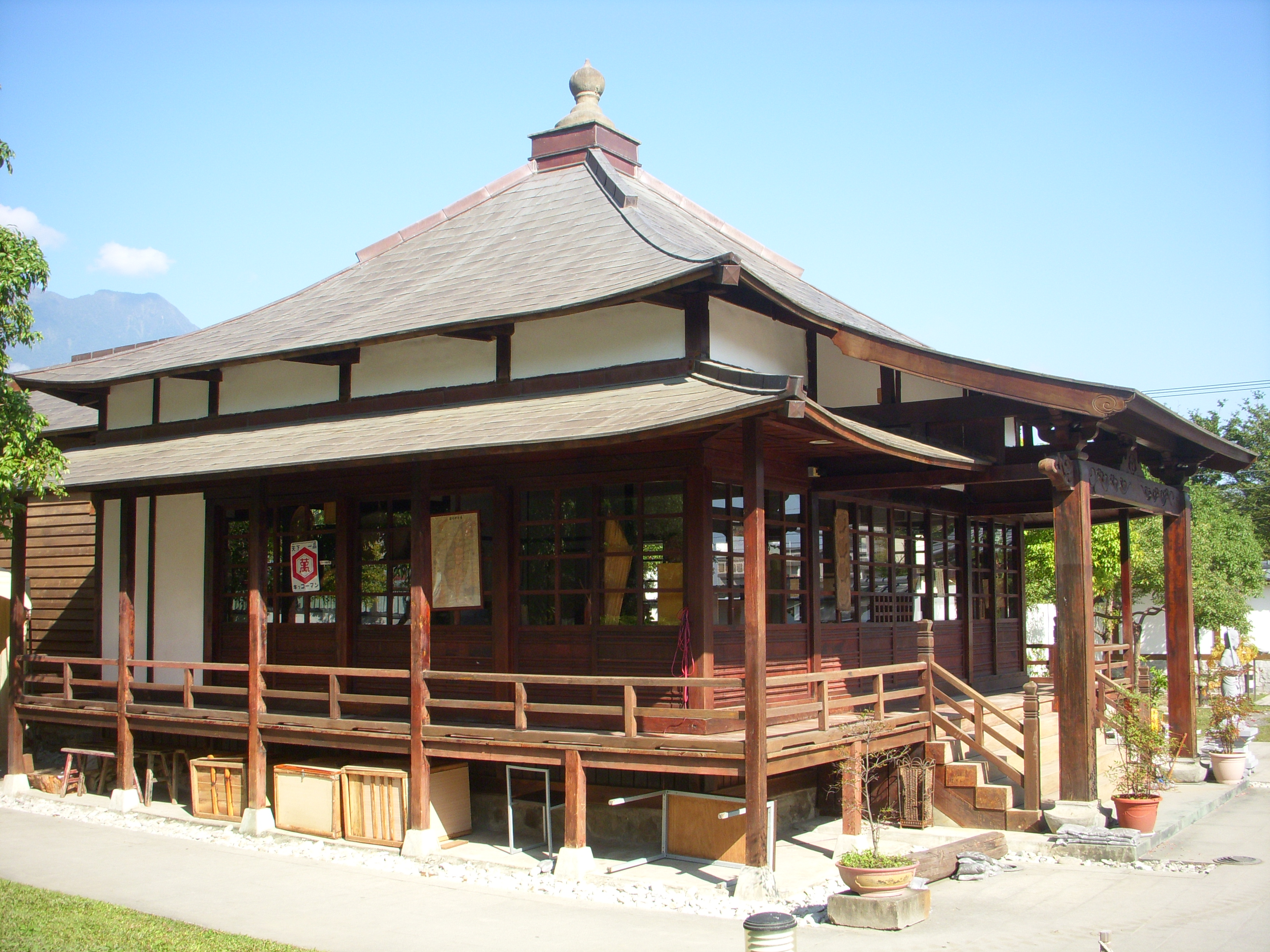
Ji'an Shrine(吉安慶修院), Hualien County (1917)

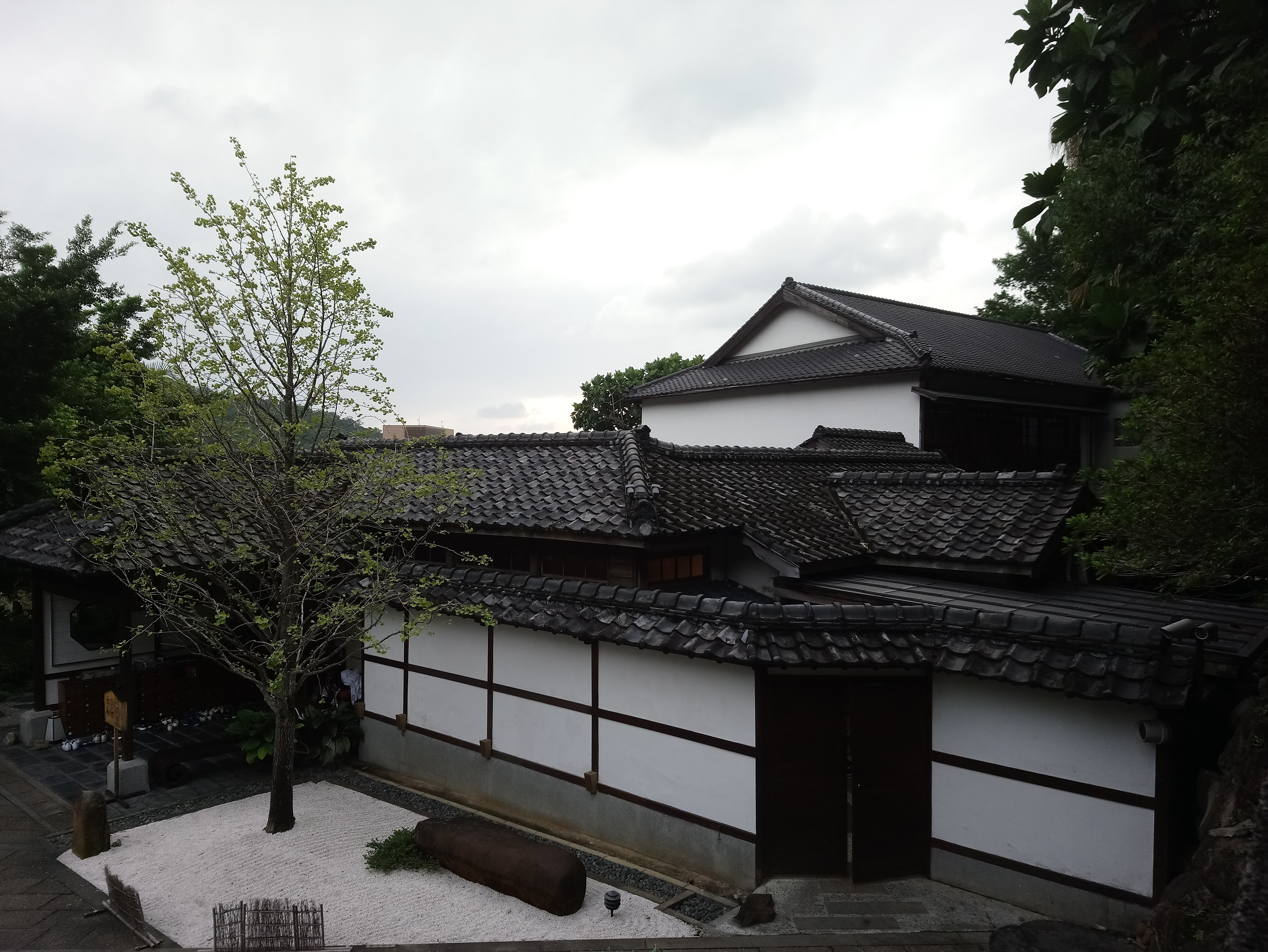
Beitou Museum, Taipei City (1921)

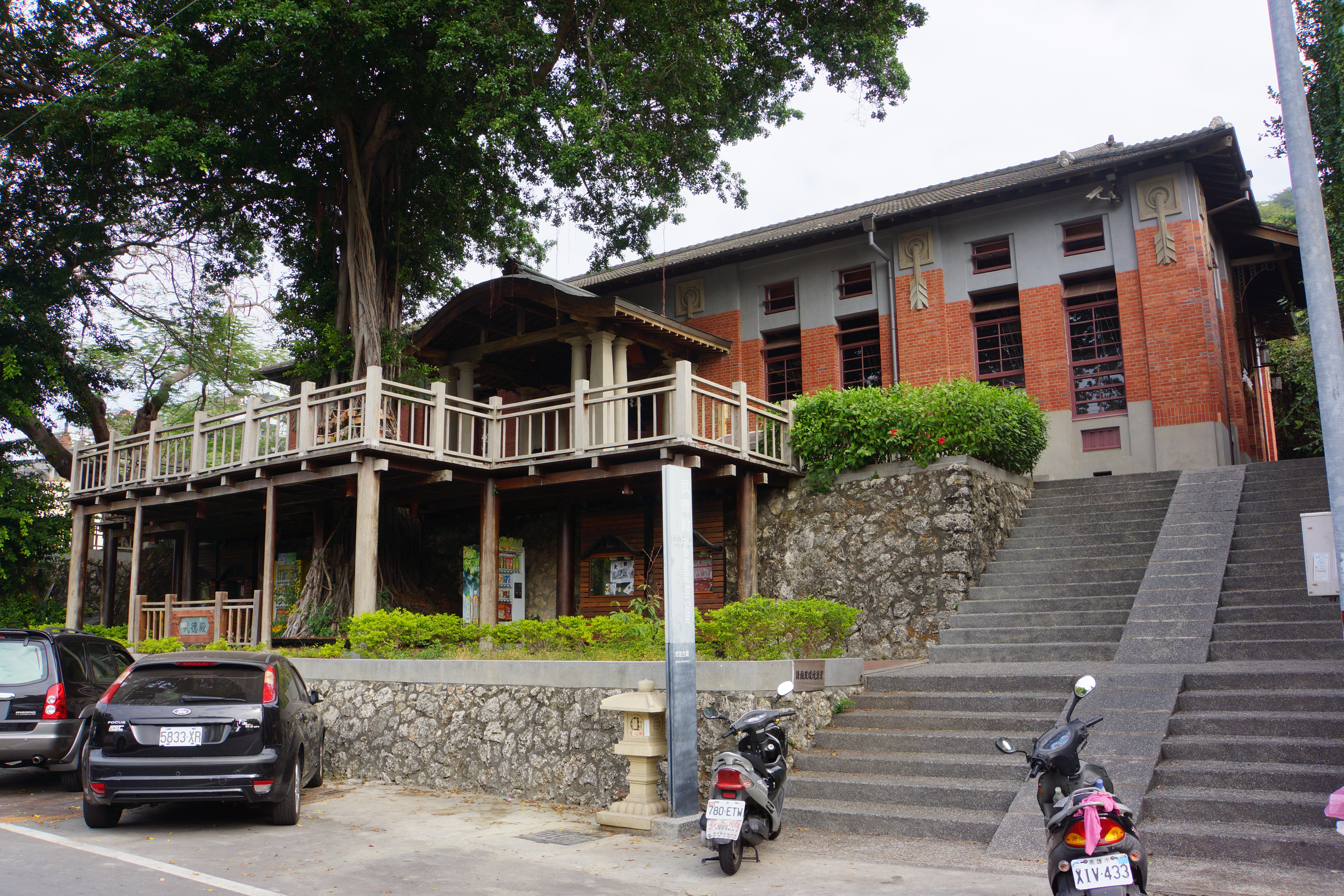
Former Takao Butokuden of Takao Prefecture, Kaohsiung City (1924)

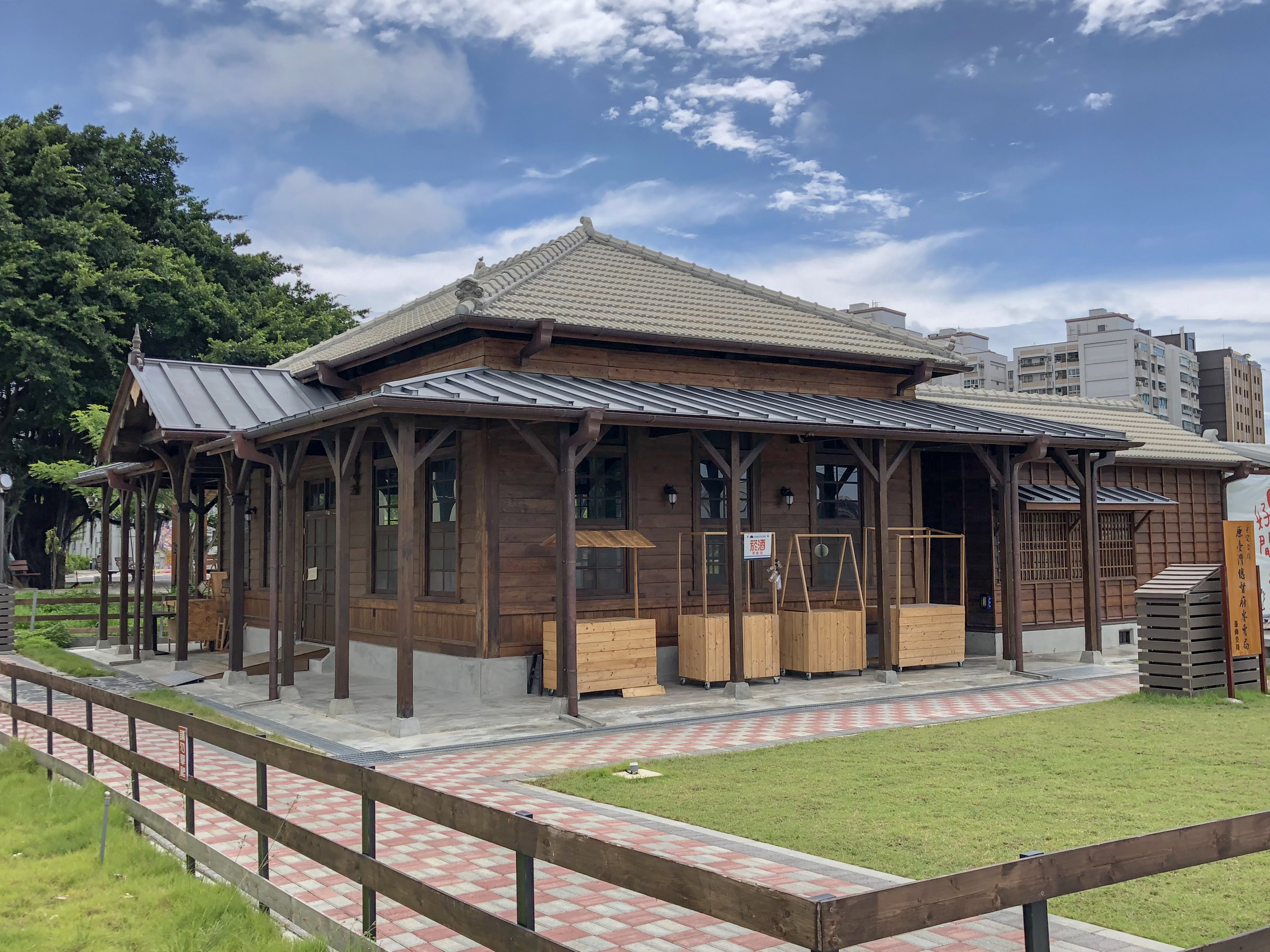
Former Monopoly Bureau Branch Office (臺灣總督府專賣局臺南支局鹽埕分室), Tainan City (1924)

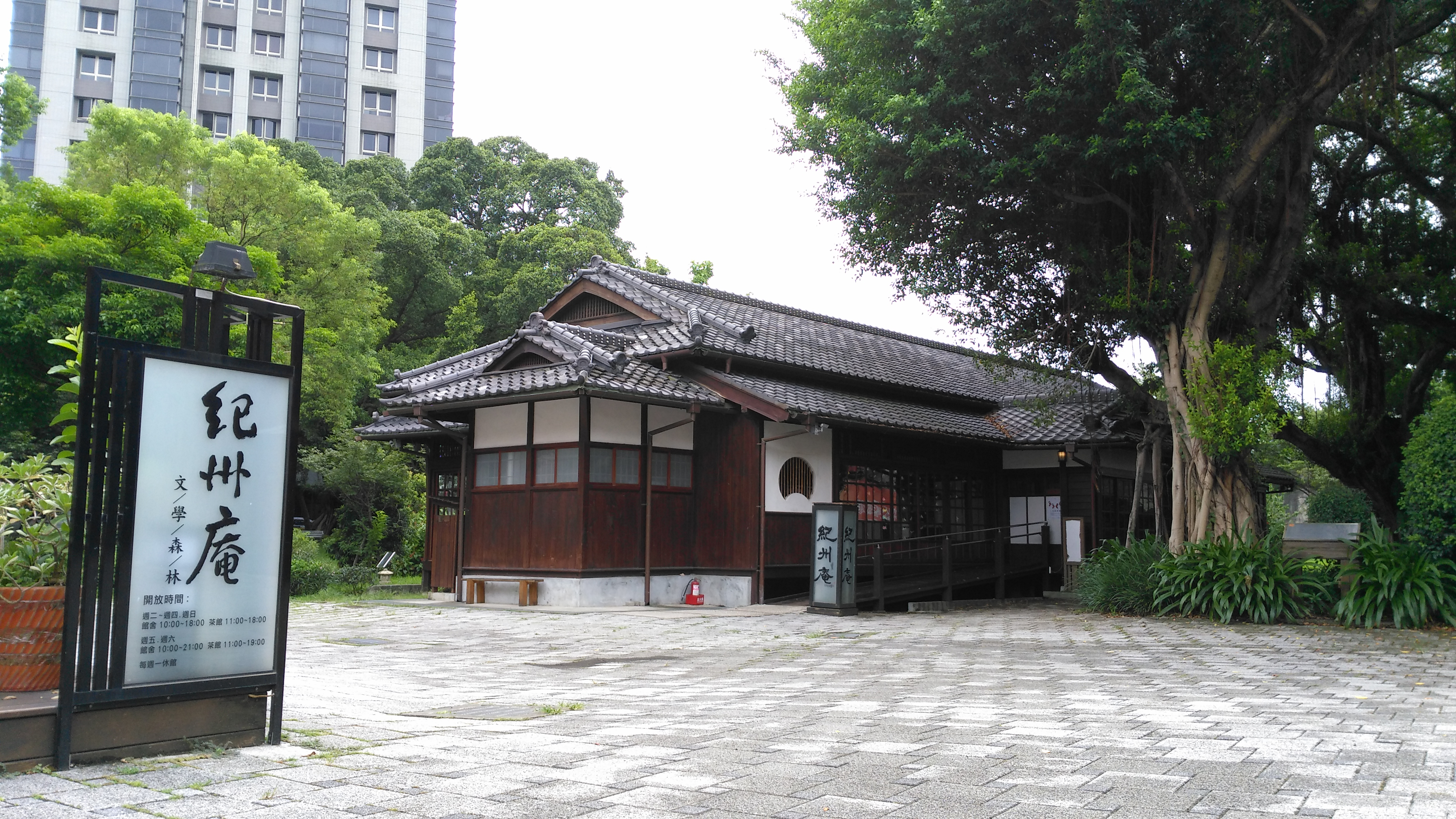
Kishu An Forest of Literature (紀州庵文學森林), Taipei City (1927–1928)

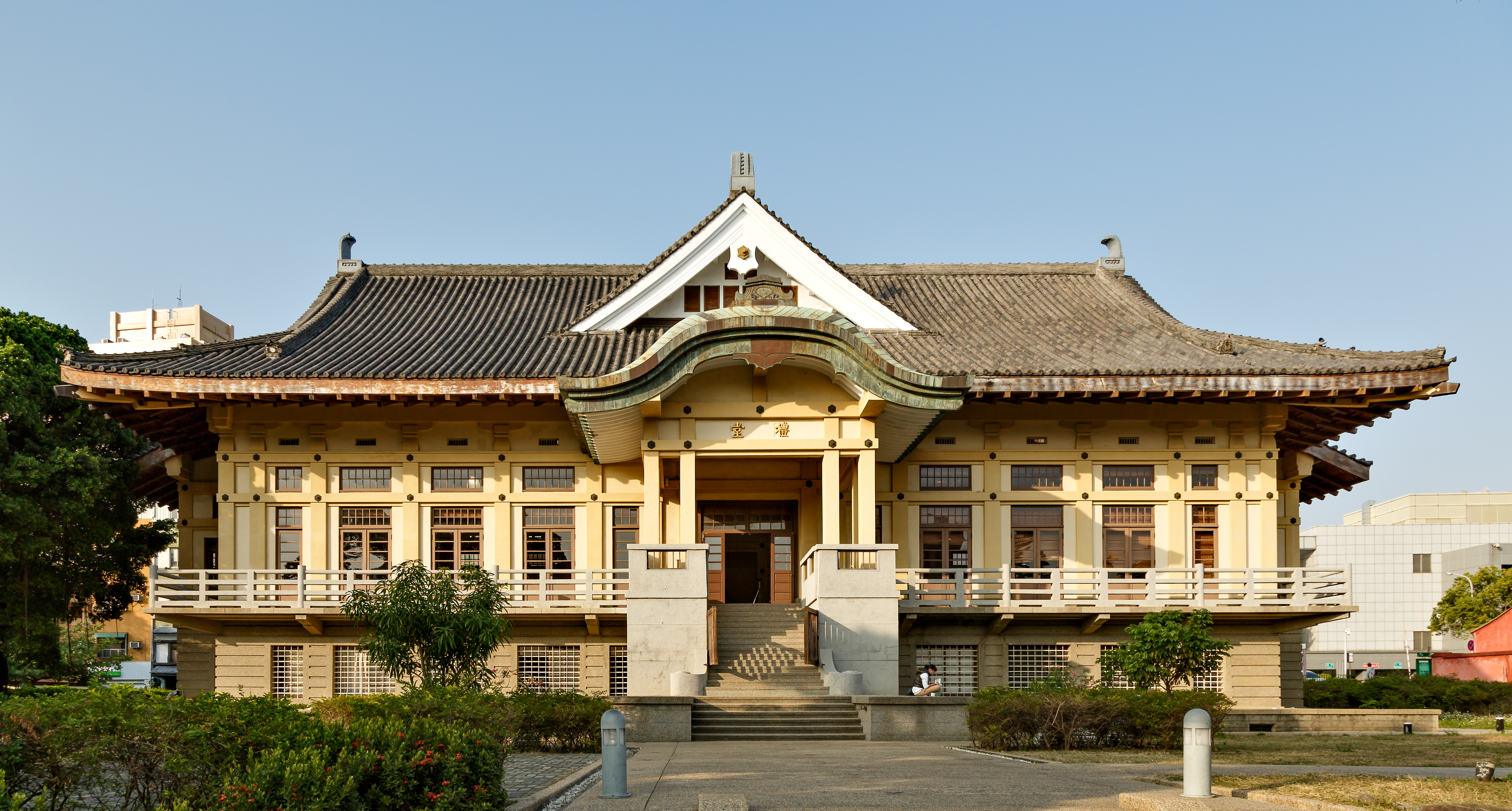
Former Tainan Butokuden of Tainan Prefecture, Tainan City (1936)

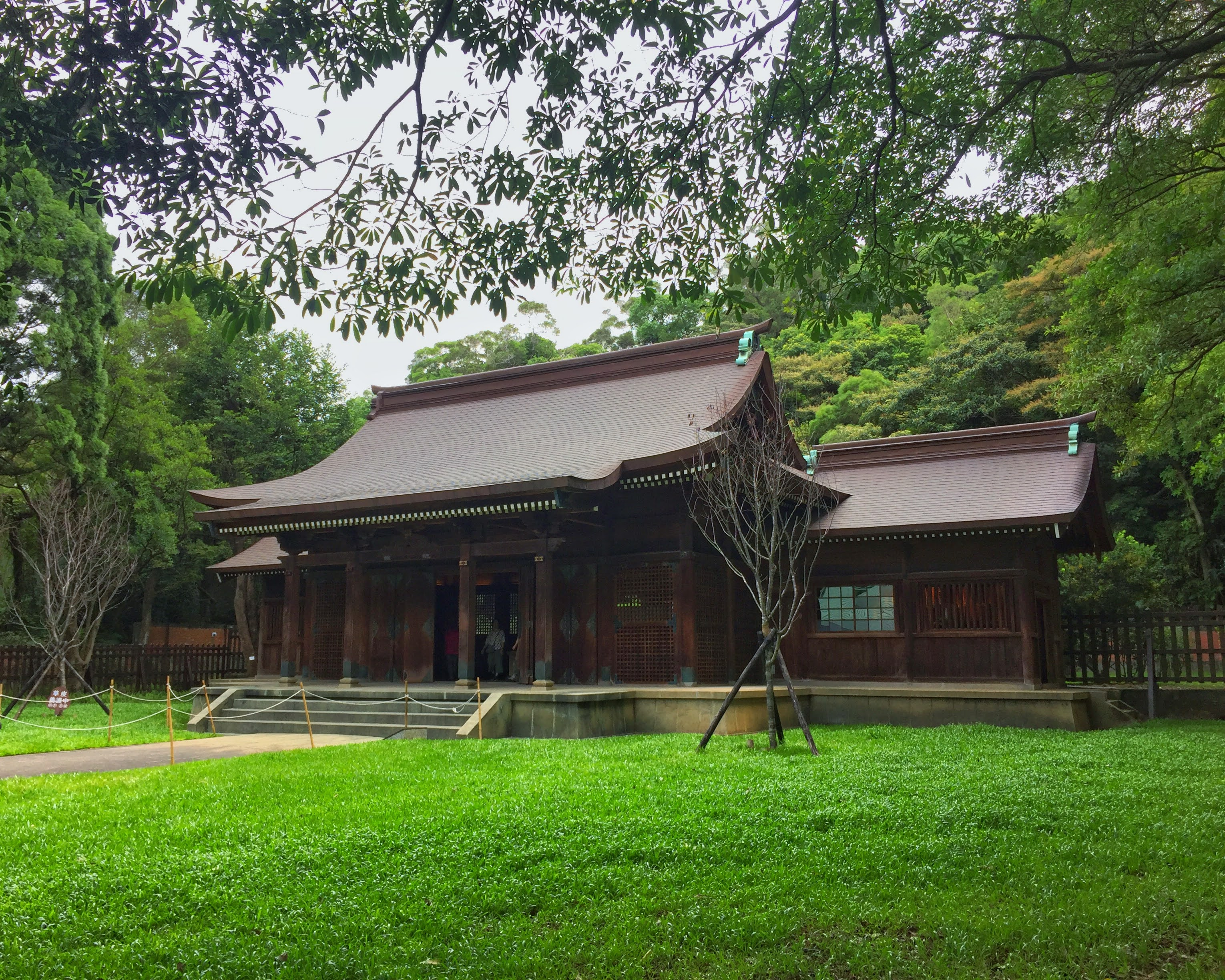
Haiden of Touen Shrine, Taoyuan City (1938)

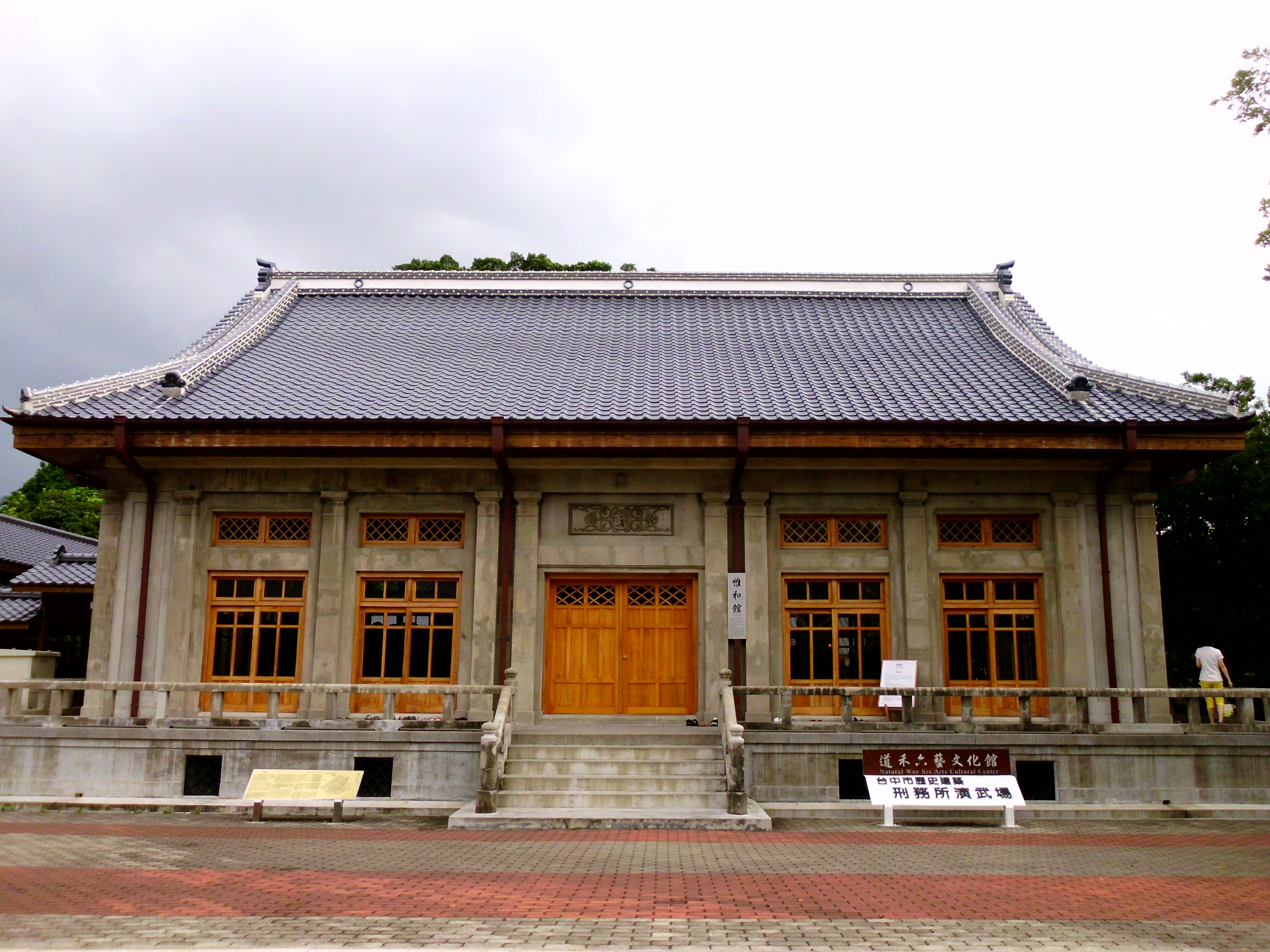
Taichung Martial Arts Hall (臺中刑務所演武場), Taichung City (1937)

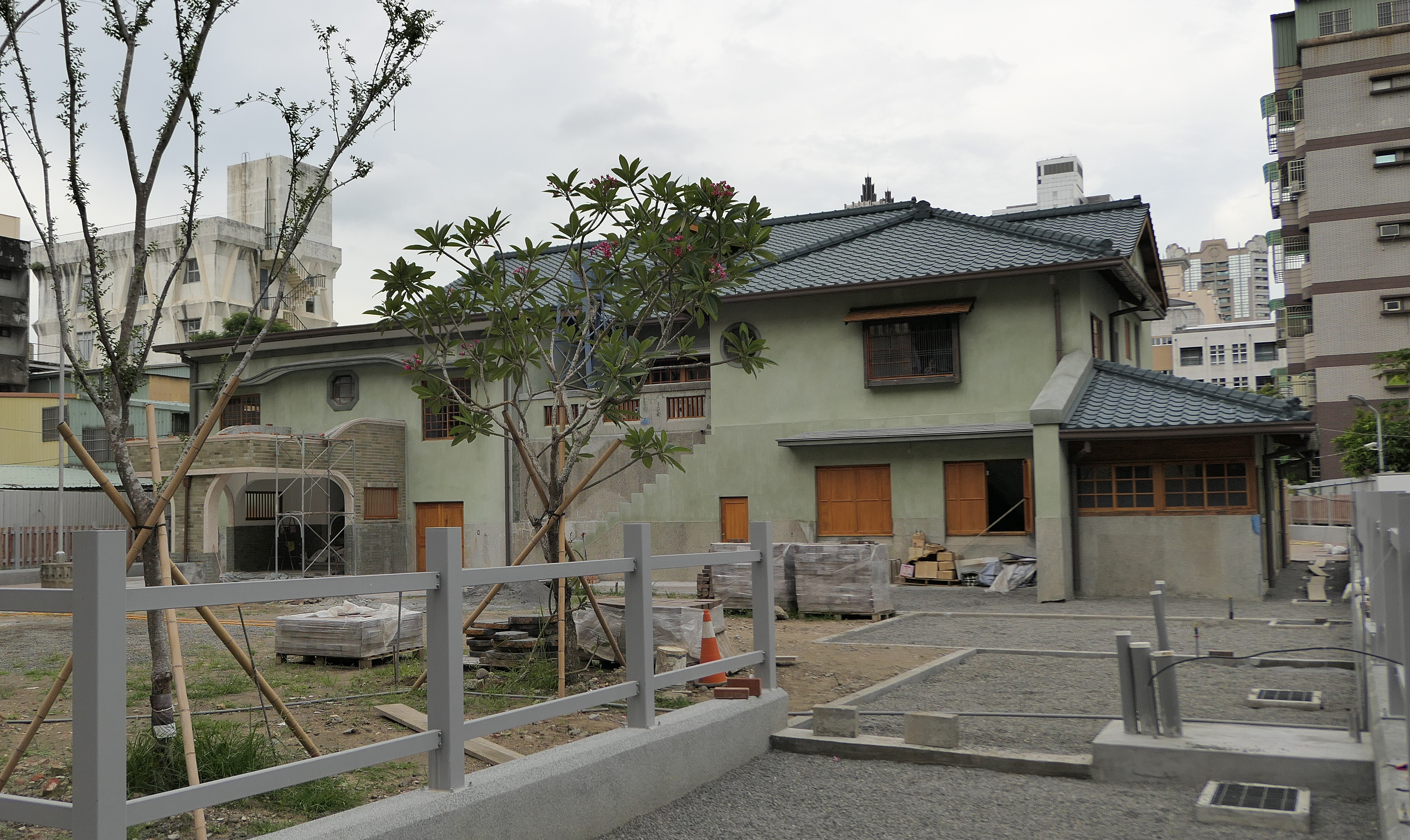
Shoyoen (逍遙園), Kaohsiung City(1940)

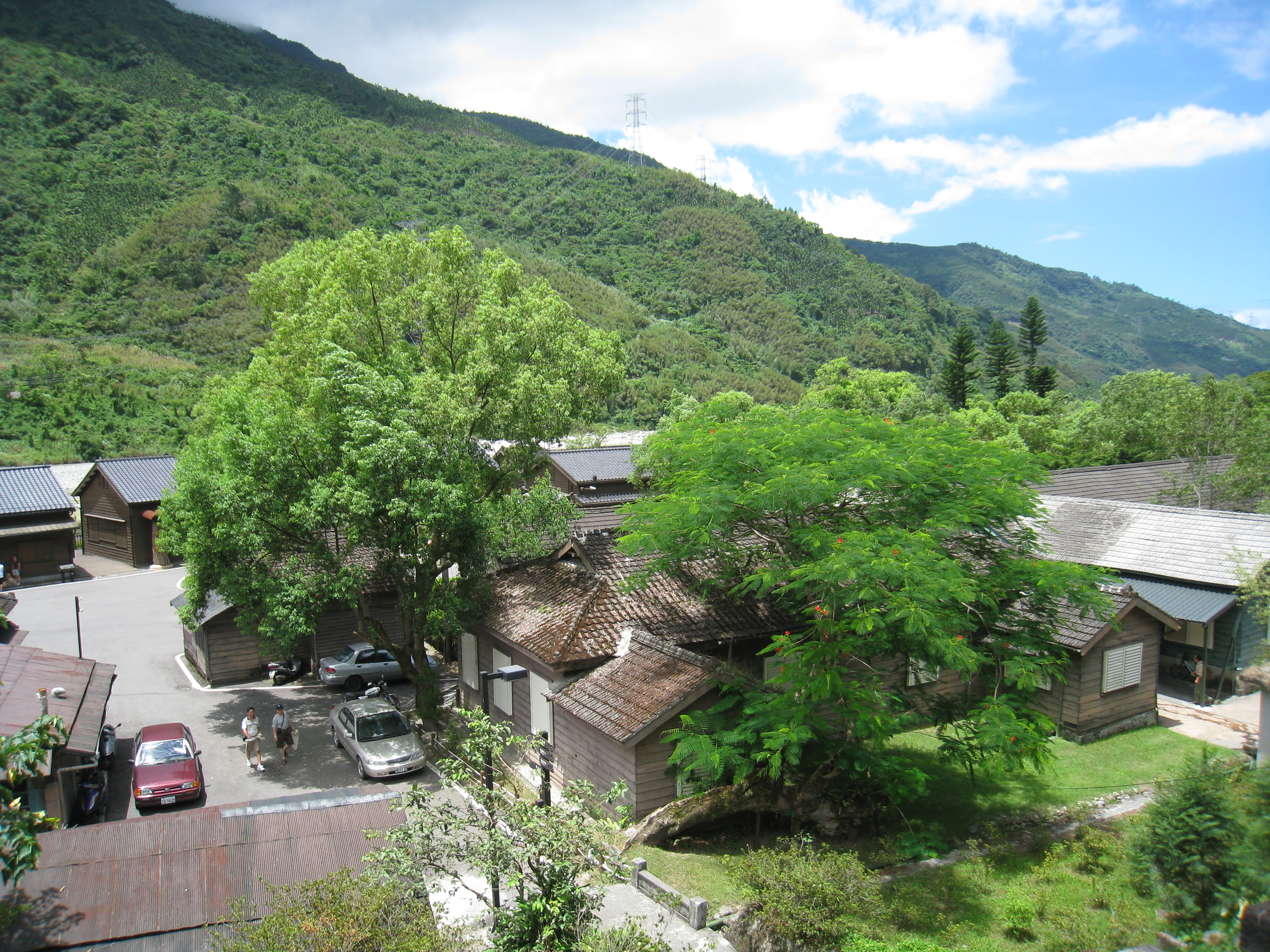
Lintianshan Forestry Culture Park, Hualien County

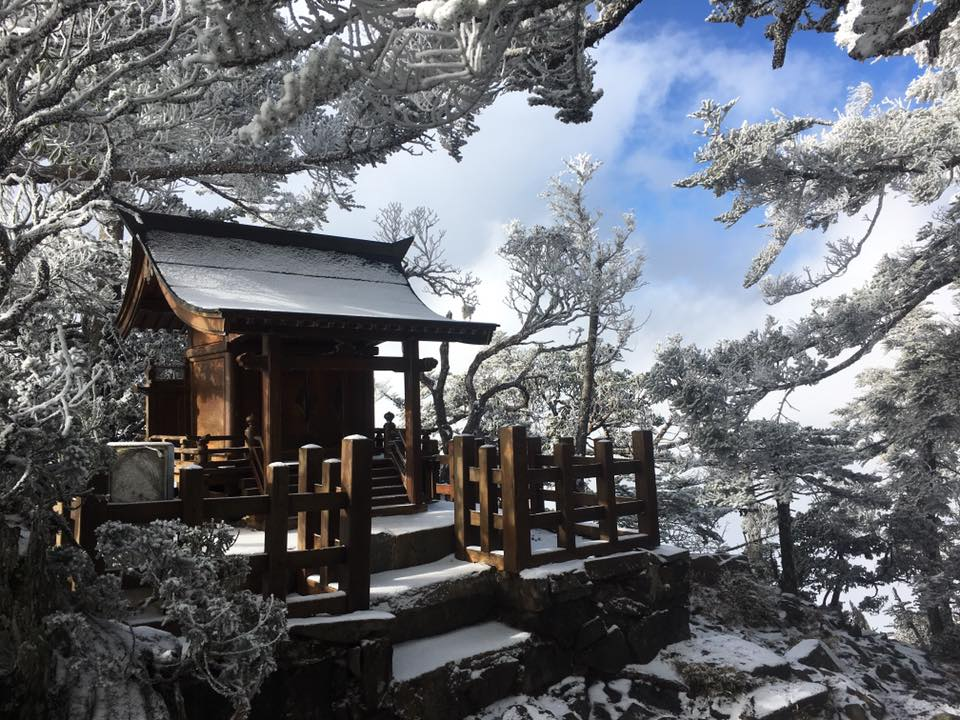
Xi Shan Shinto Shrine(西山祠), Chiayi County

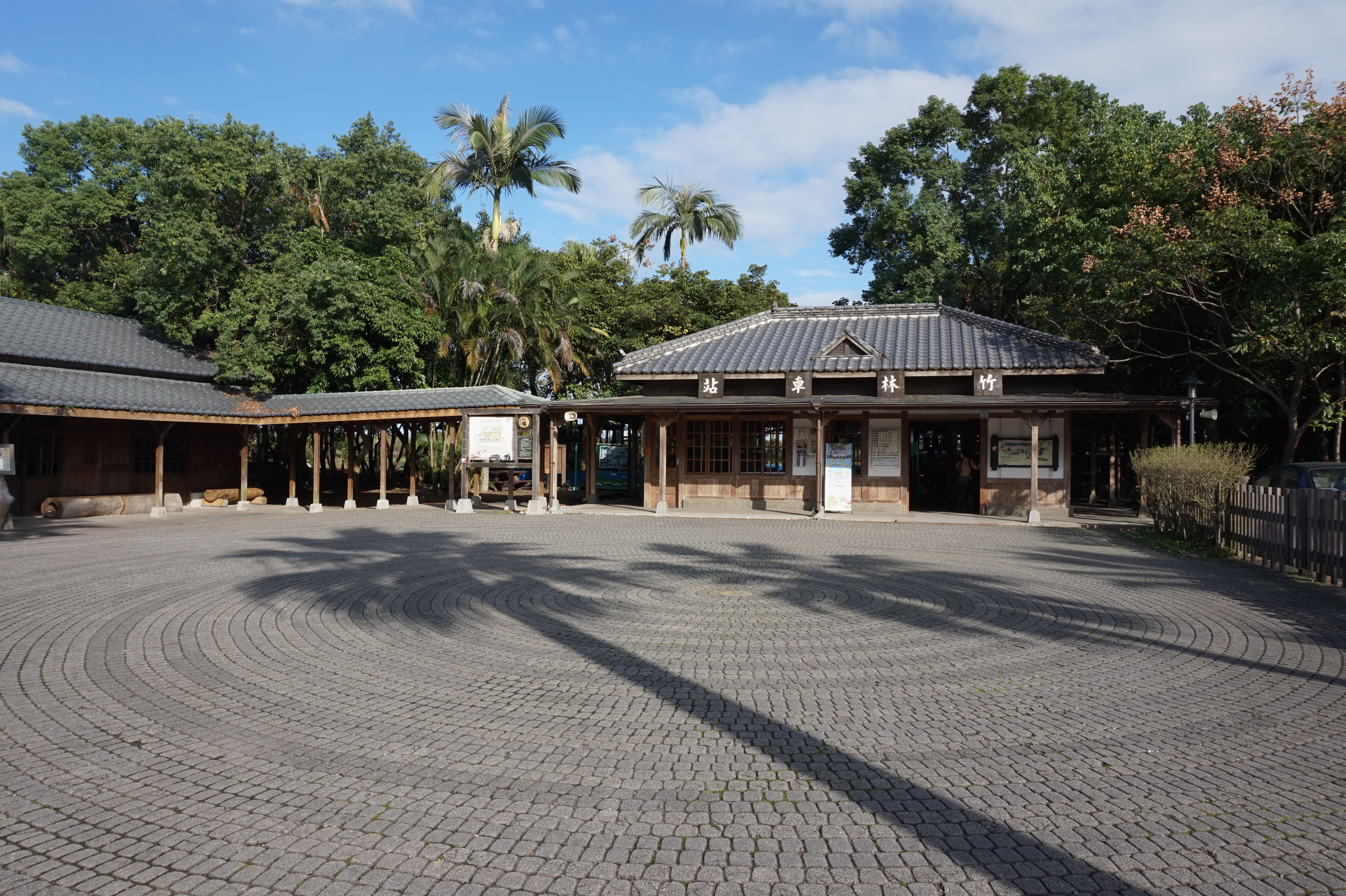
Chulin Station (竹林車站) in Luodong Forestry Culture Park, Yilan County, rebuilt in 2008

Asian Renaissance Style(興亞式) and Imperial Crown Style

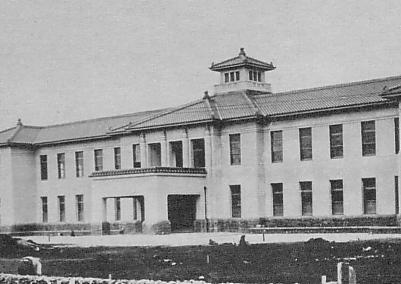
Former Hoko Prefectural Office(澎湖廳廳舍), Penghu County (1934)

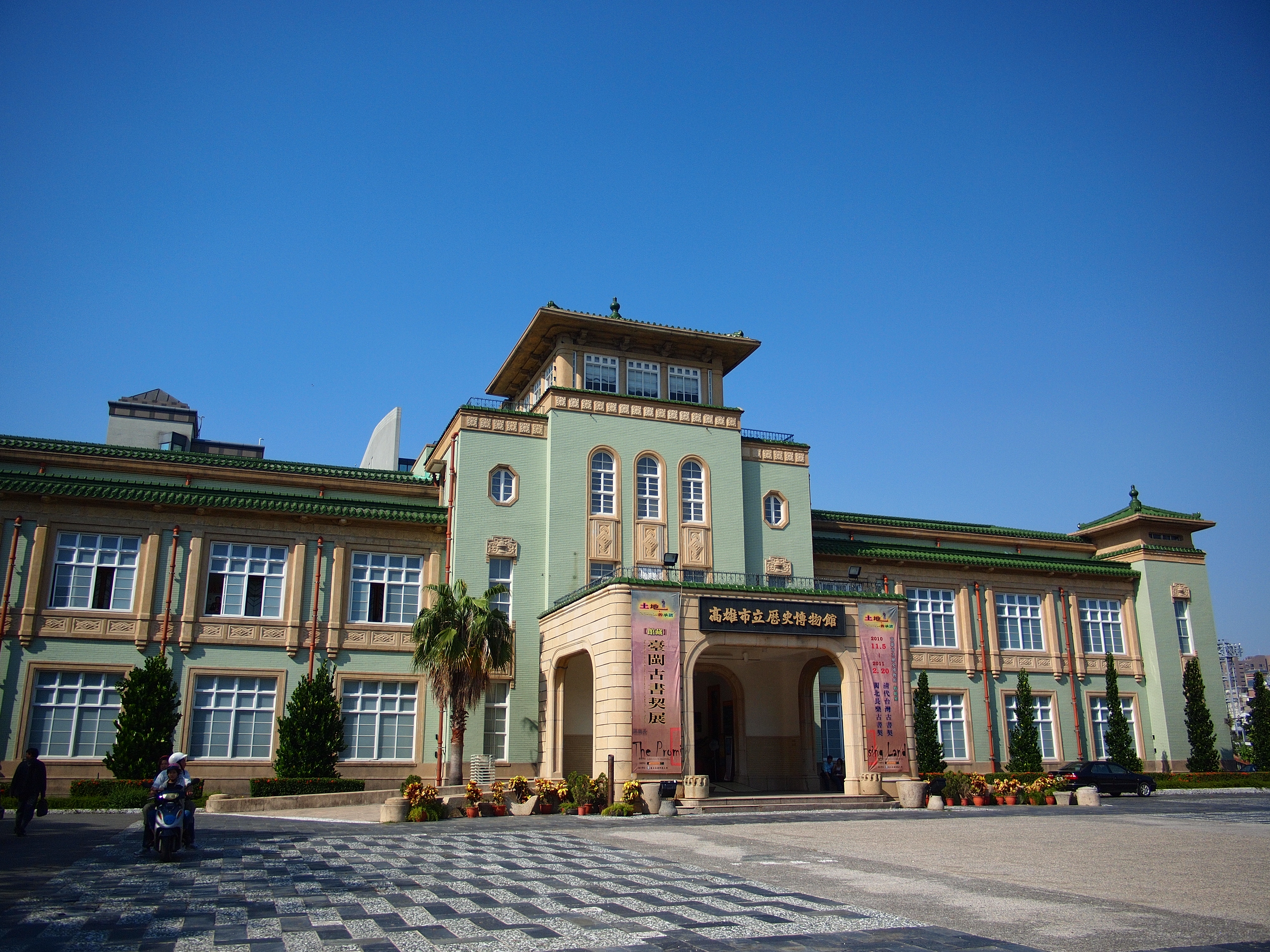
Kaohsiung Museum of History, Kaohsiung City (1939)

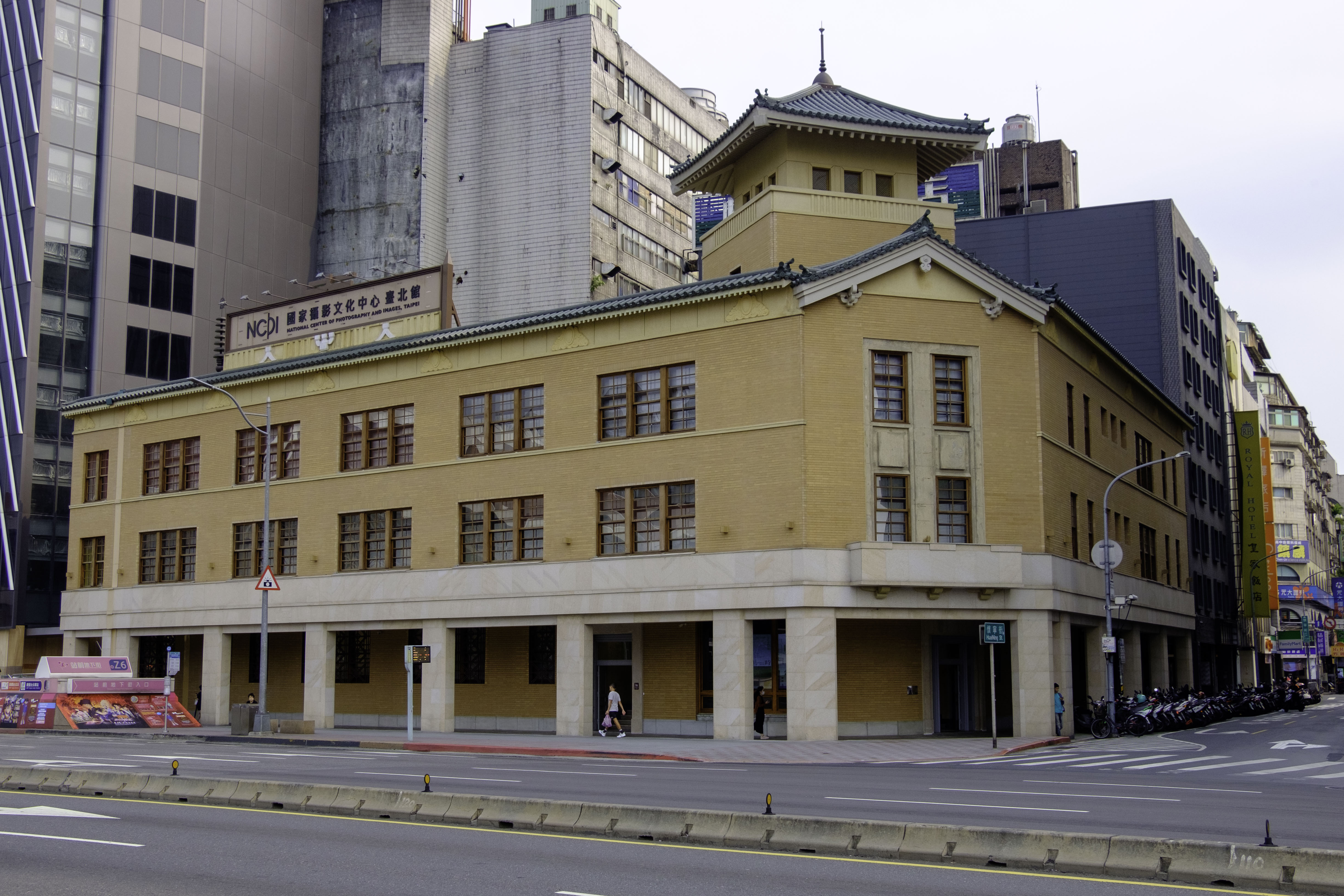
National Center of Photography and Images (國家攝影文化中心), Taipei City (1937)

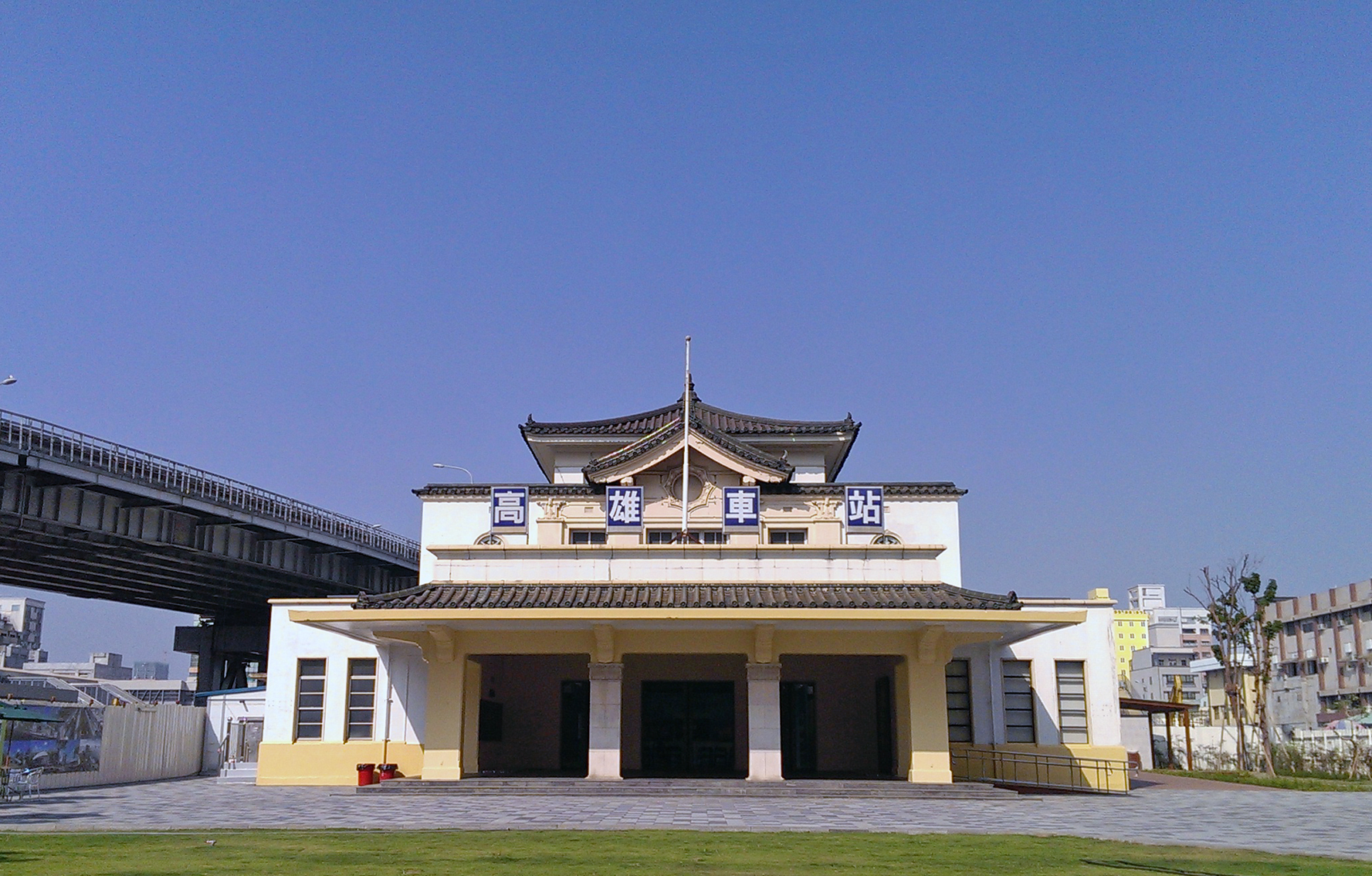
Former Takao Station, Kaohsiung City (1941)

== Republic of China (1946–present) ==
The Second World War served as a dividing point in Taiwanese architecture, bringing both political change and significant physical destruction. After the war a wave of new buildings was built with American aid, this influence lead to the dominance of the International Style. More contemporary architecture focuses on preserving the past as well as building new spaces, often finding ways to re-use historical or disused spaces.

Chinese Cultural Renaissance

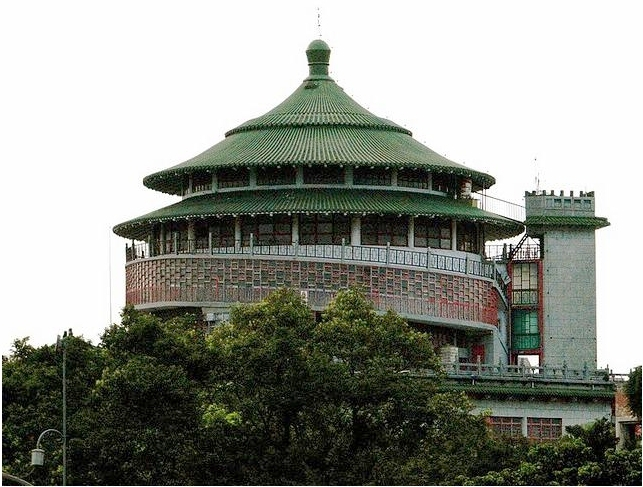
Nanhai Academy, Taipei City

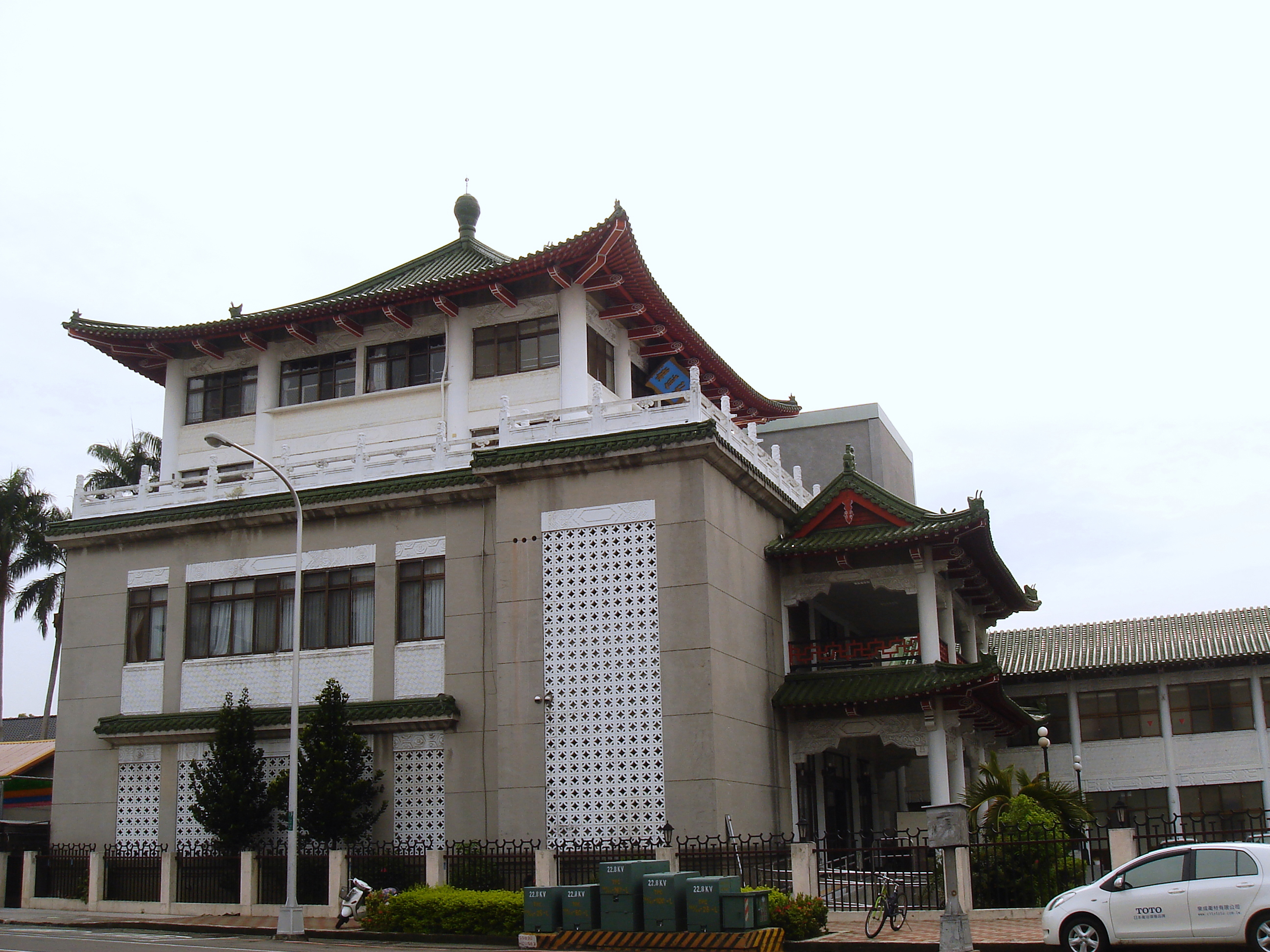
Internship Youth Hostel at Taichung Agricultural Senior High School (台中高農實習旅館), Taichung City

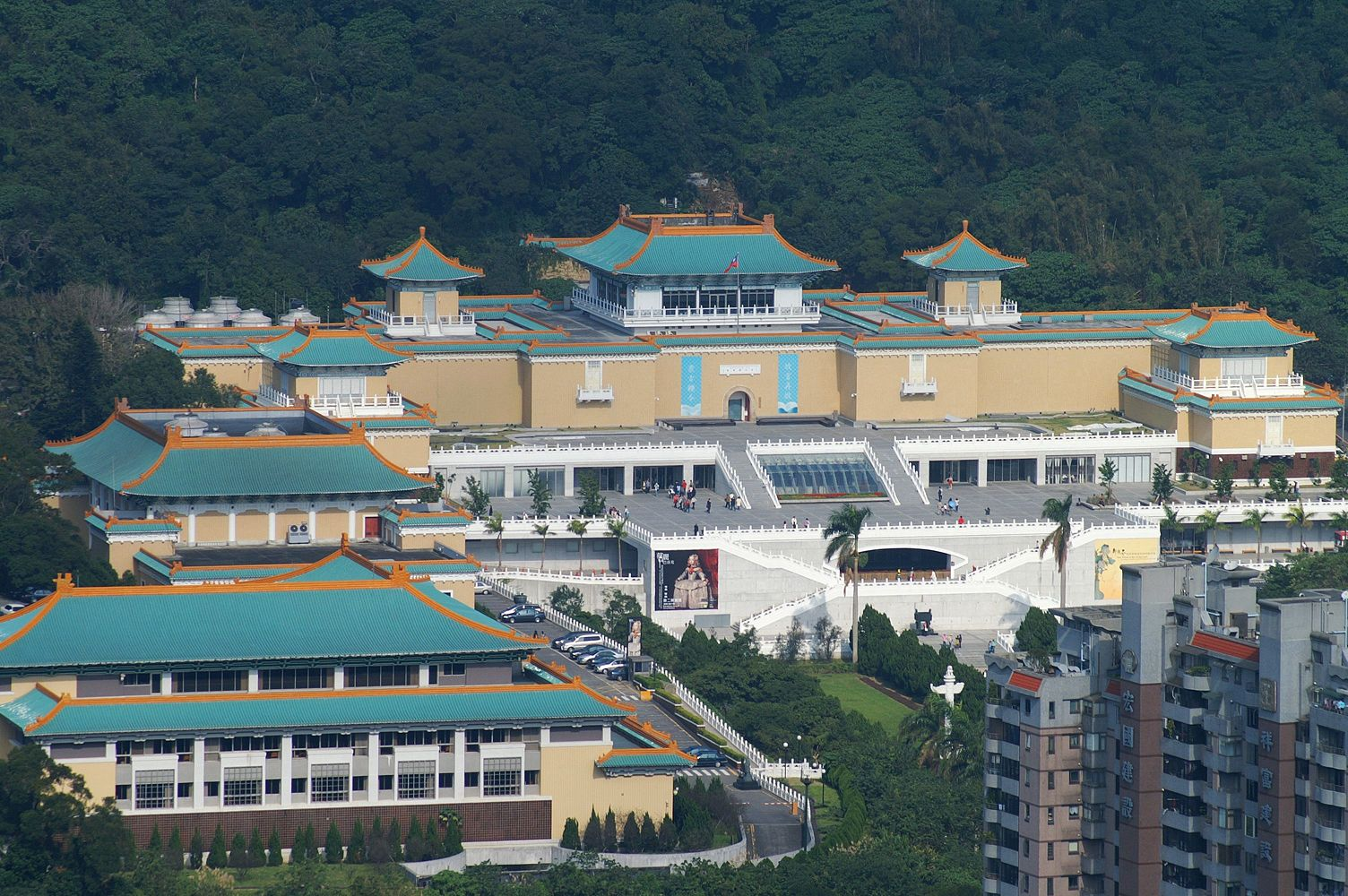
National Palace Museum, Taipei City

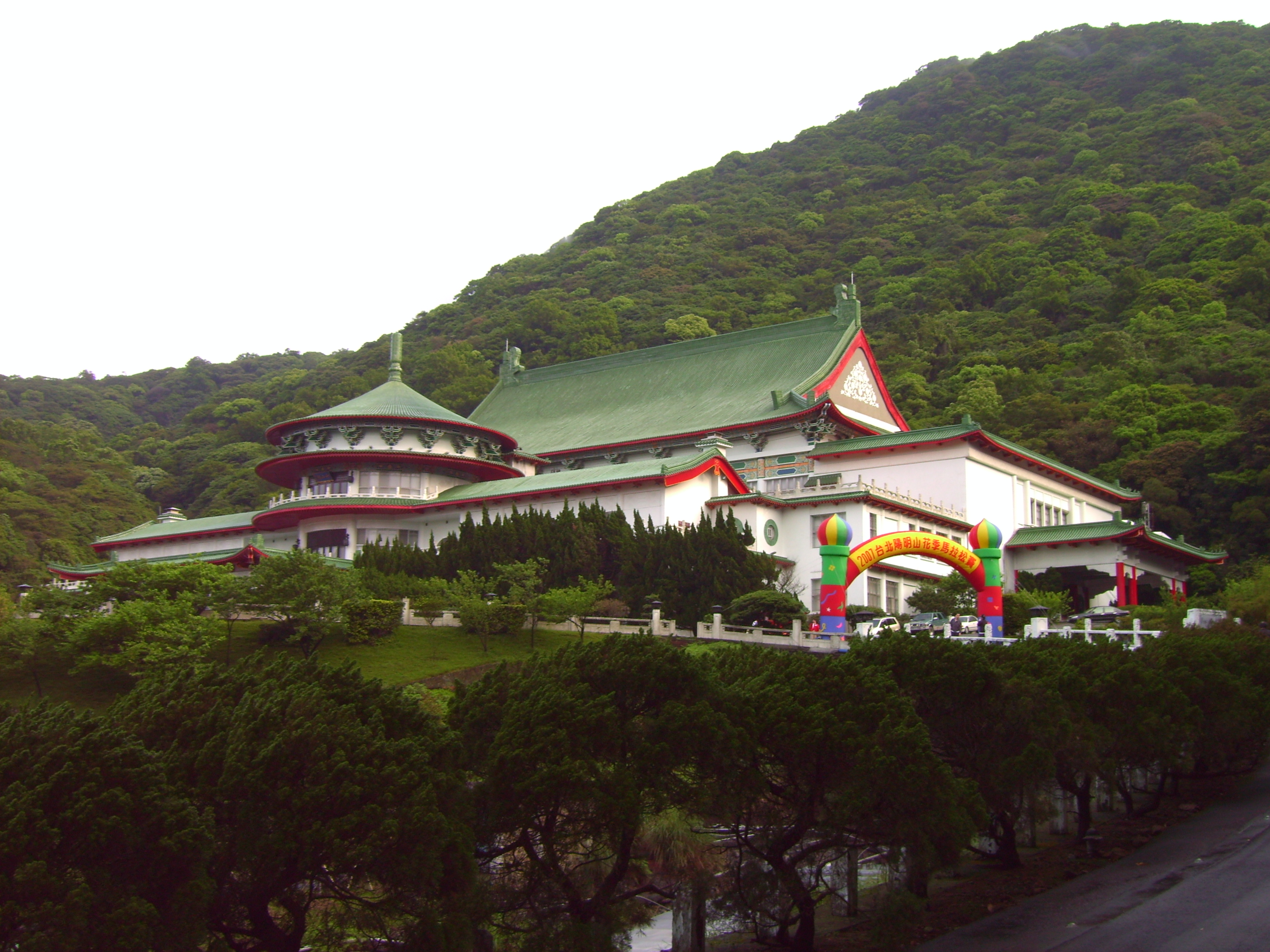
Chung-Shan Building, Taipei City, designed by Xiu Zelan.

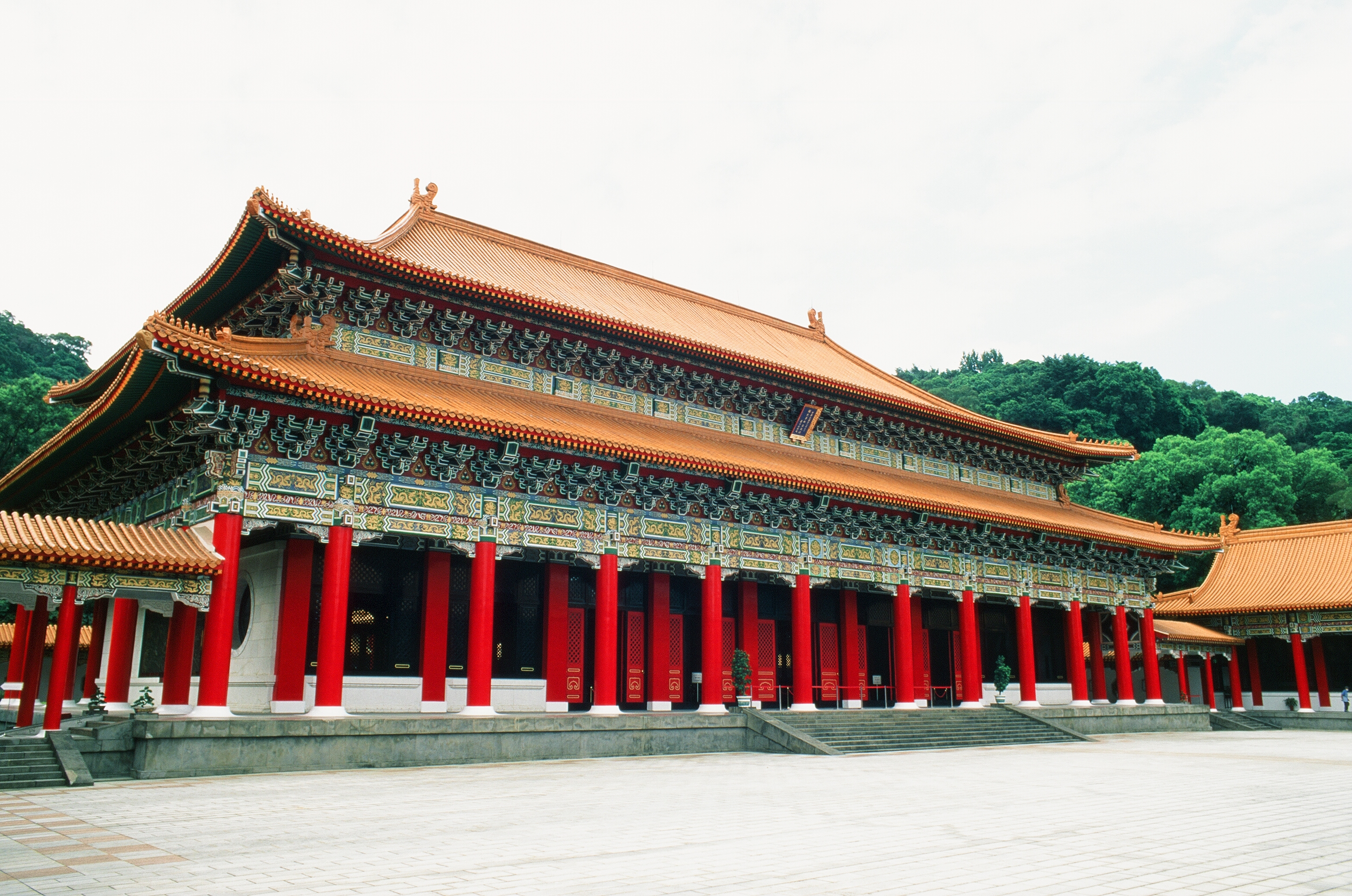
National Revolutionary Martyrs' Shrine, Taipei City

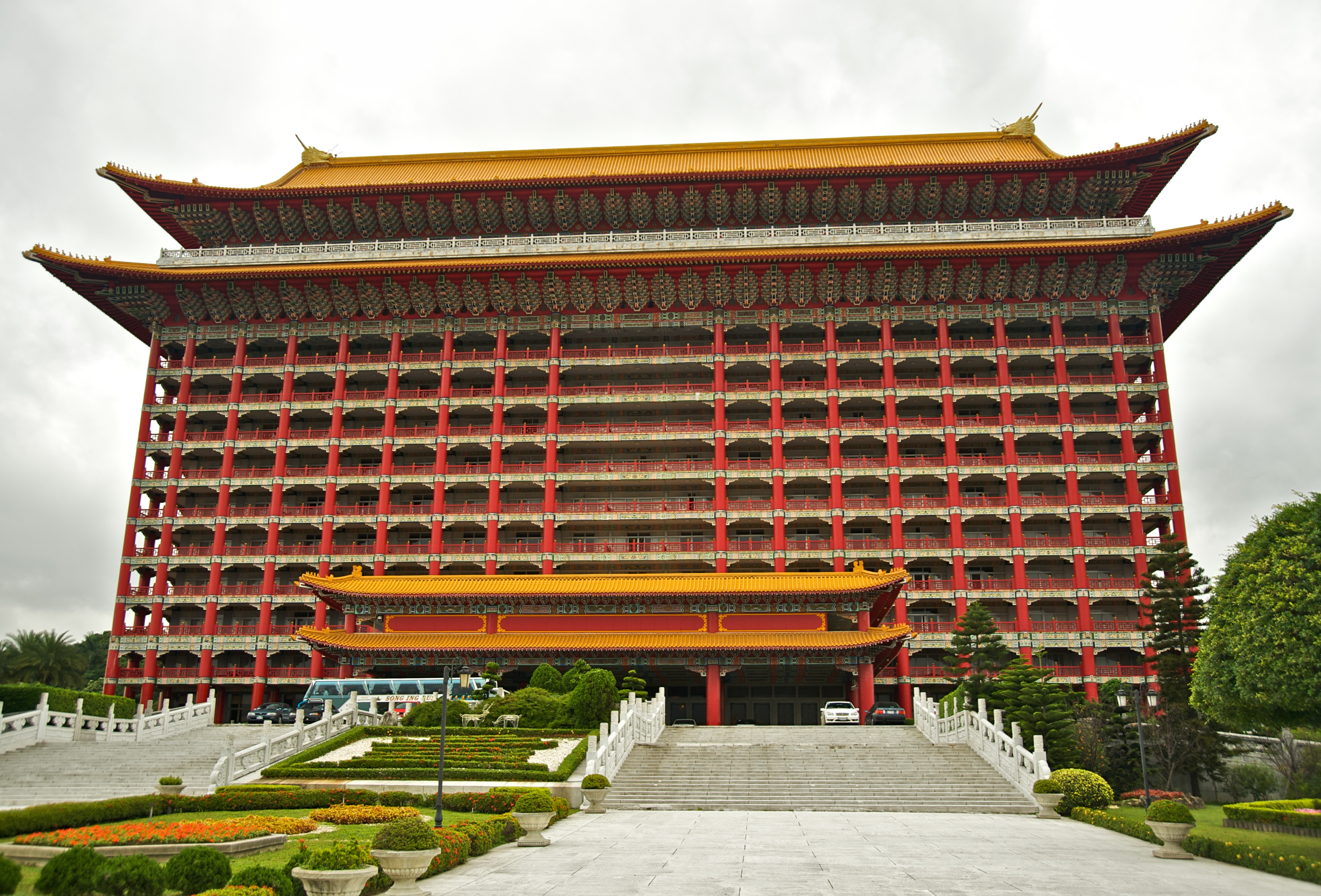
The expansion designs implemented in the Taipei Grand Hotel from 1952 to 1973.

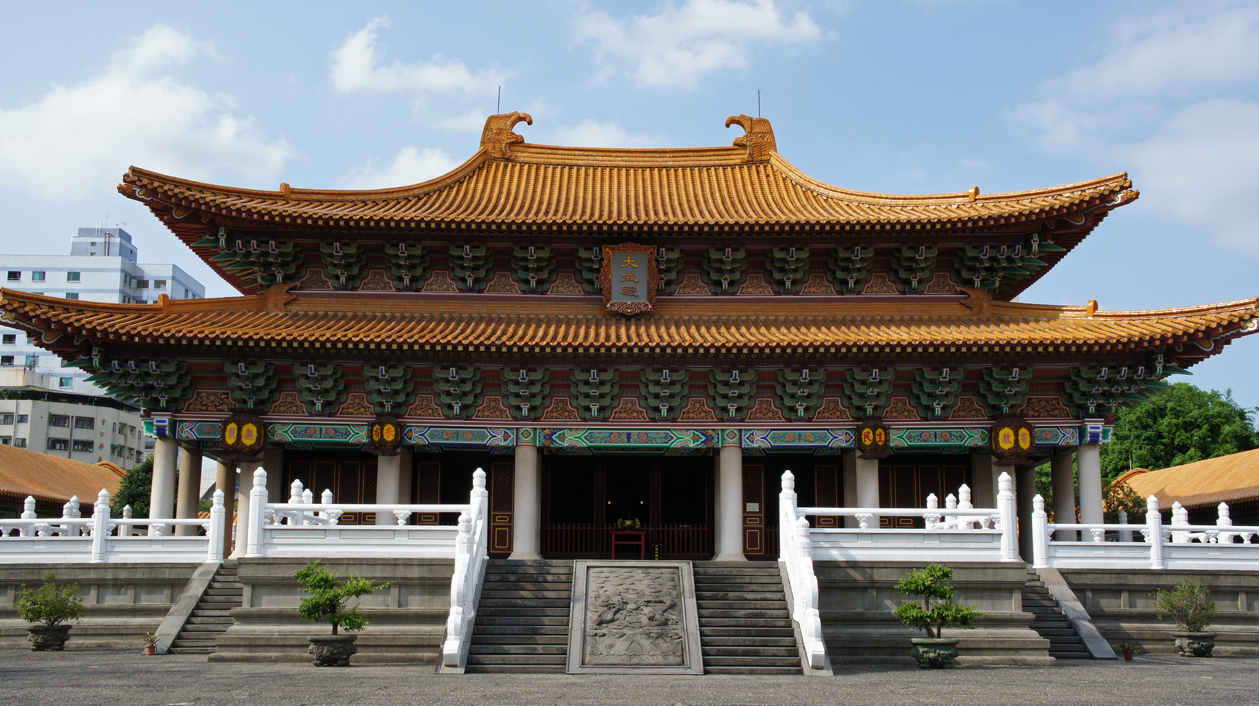
Dachengdian(大成殿) of Taichung Confucius Temple, Taichung City

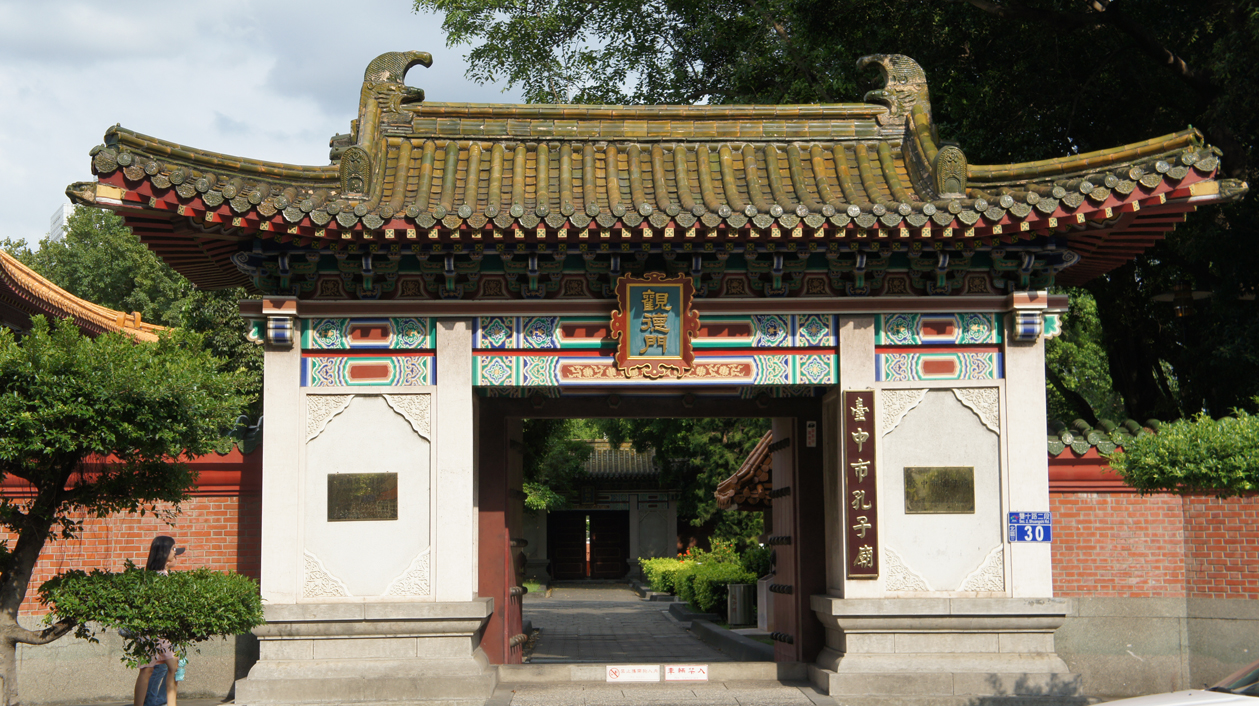
Guandemen(觀德門) of Taichung Confucius Temple, Taichung City

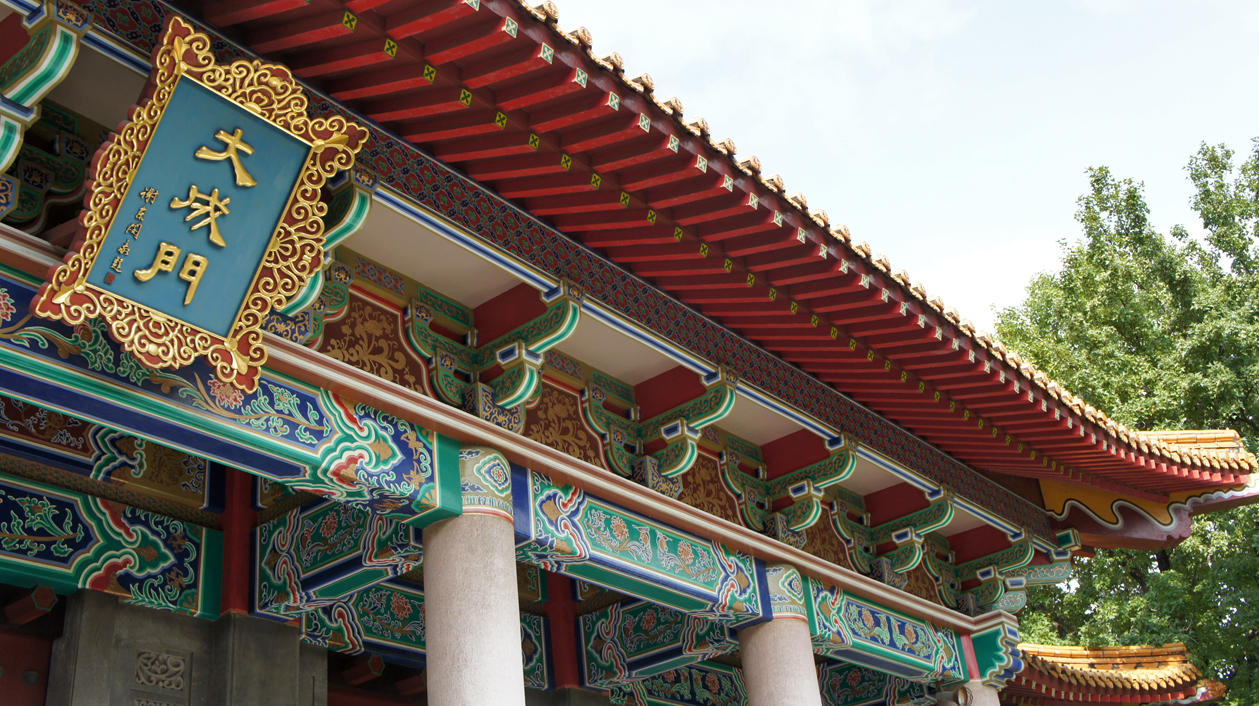
Hip and gable roof of Dachengdian (大成殿) of Taichung Confucius Temple, Taichung City

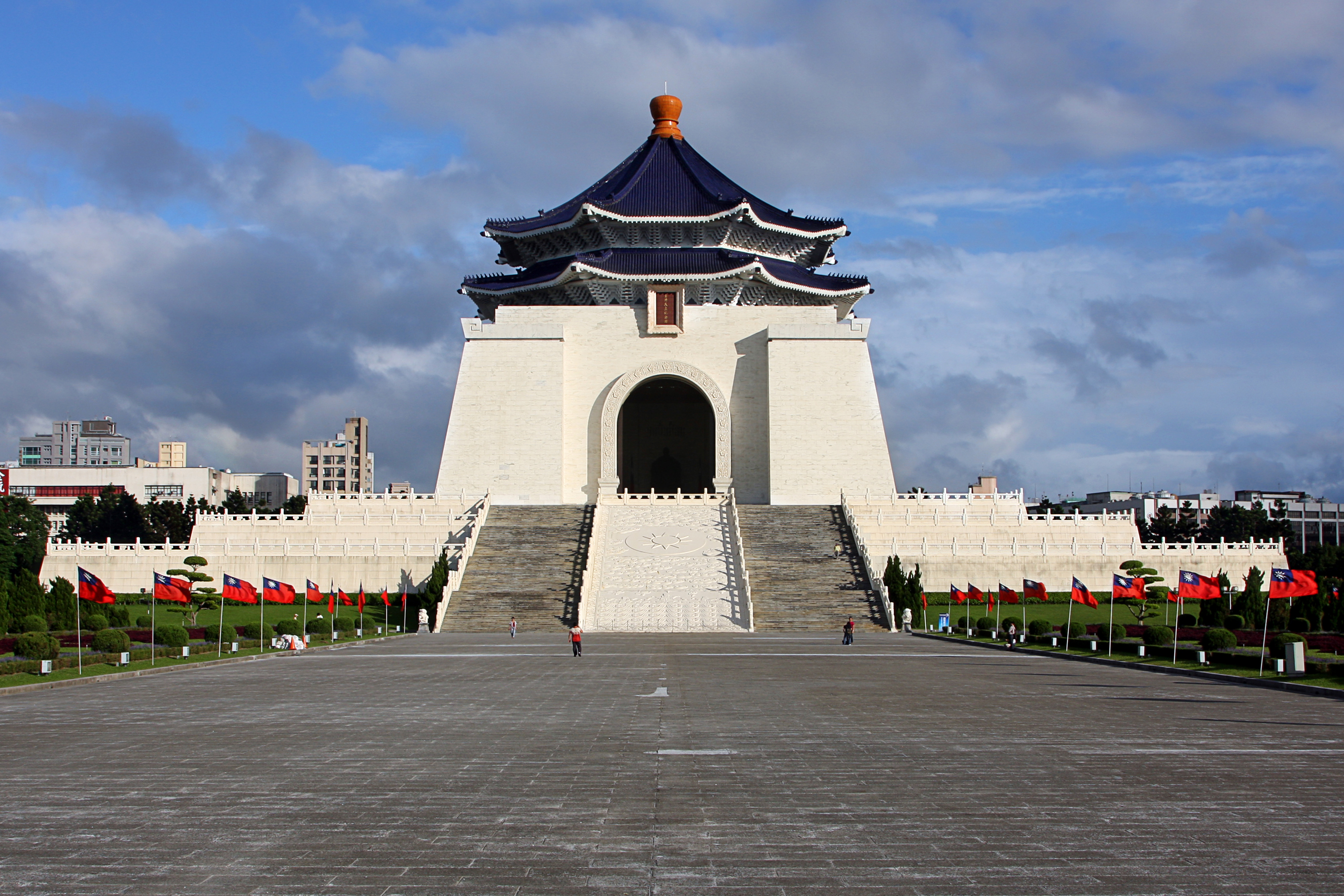
Chiang Kai-shek Memorial Hall, Taipei City

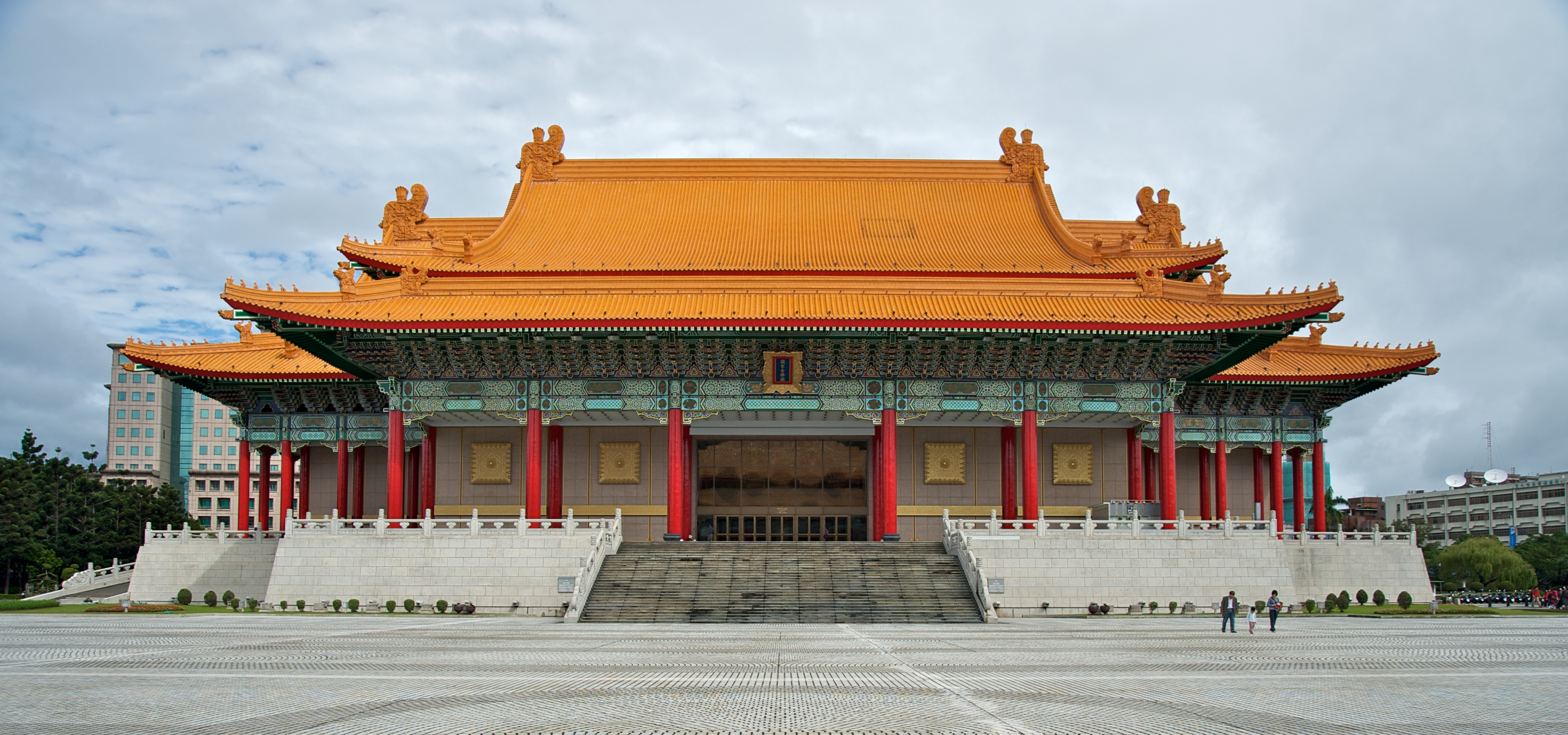
National Concert Hall, Taipei City

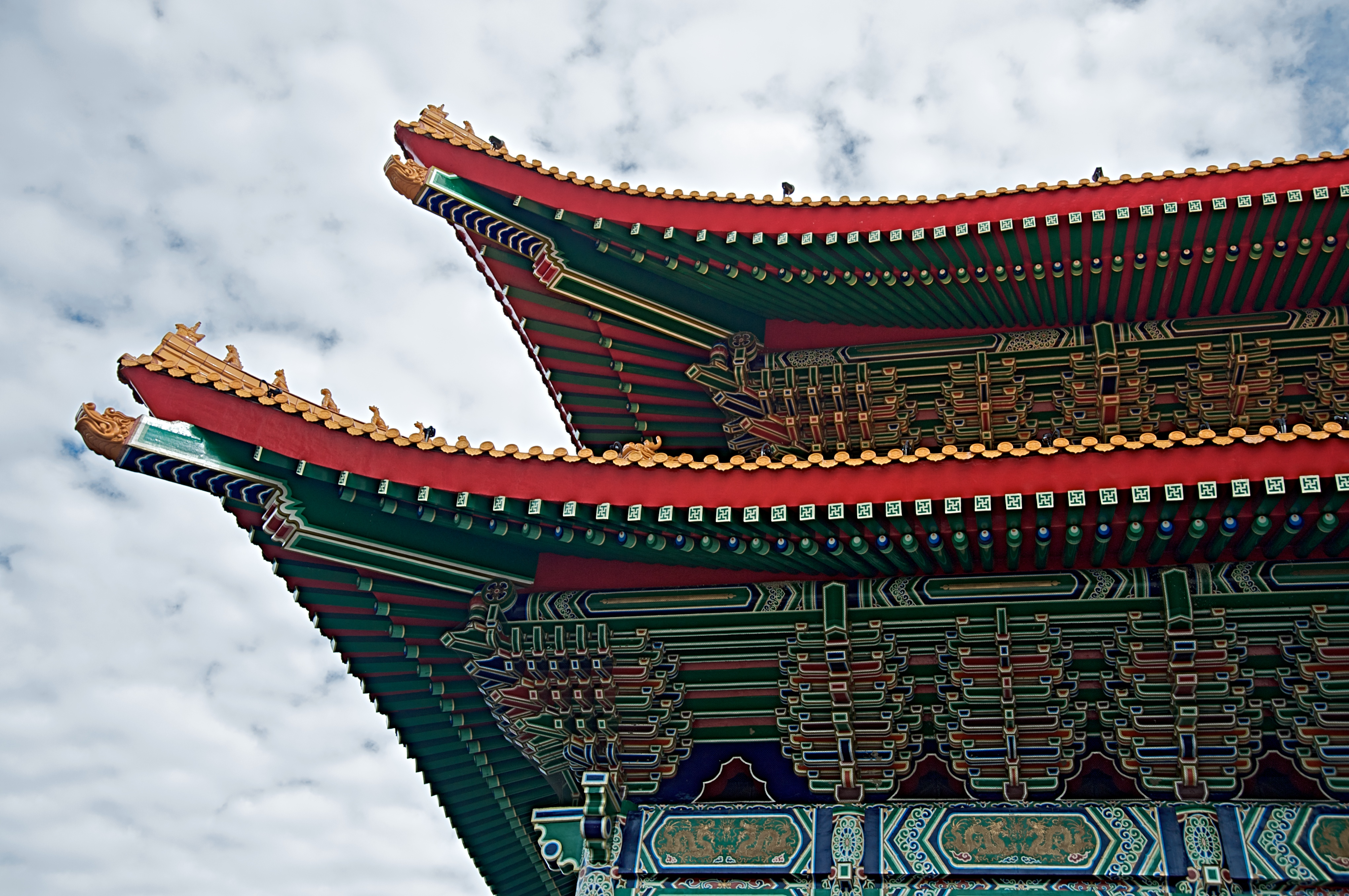
The wooden brackets used on the National Theater, Taipei City

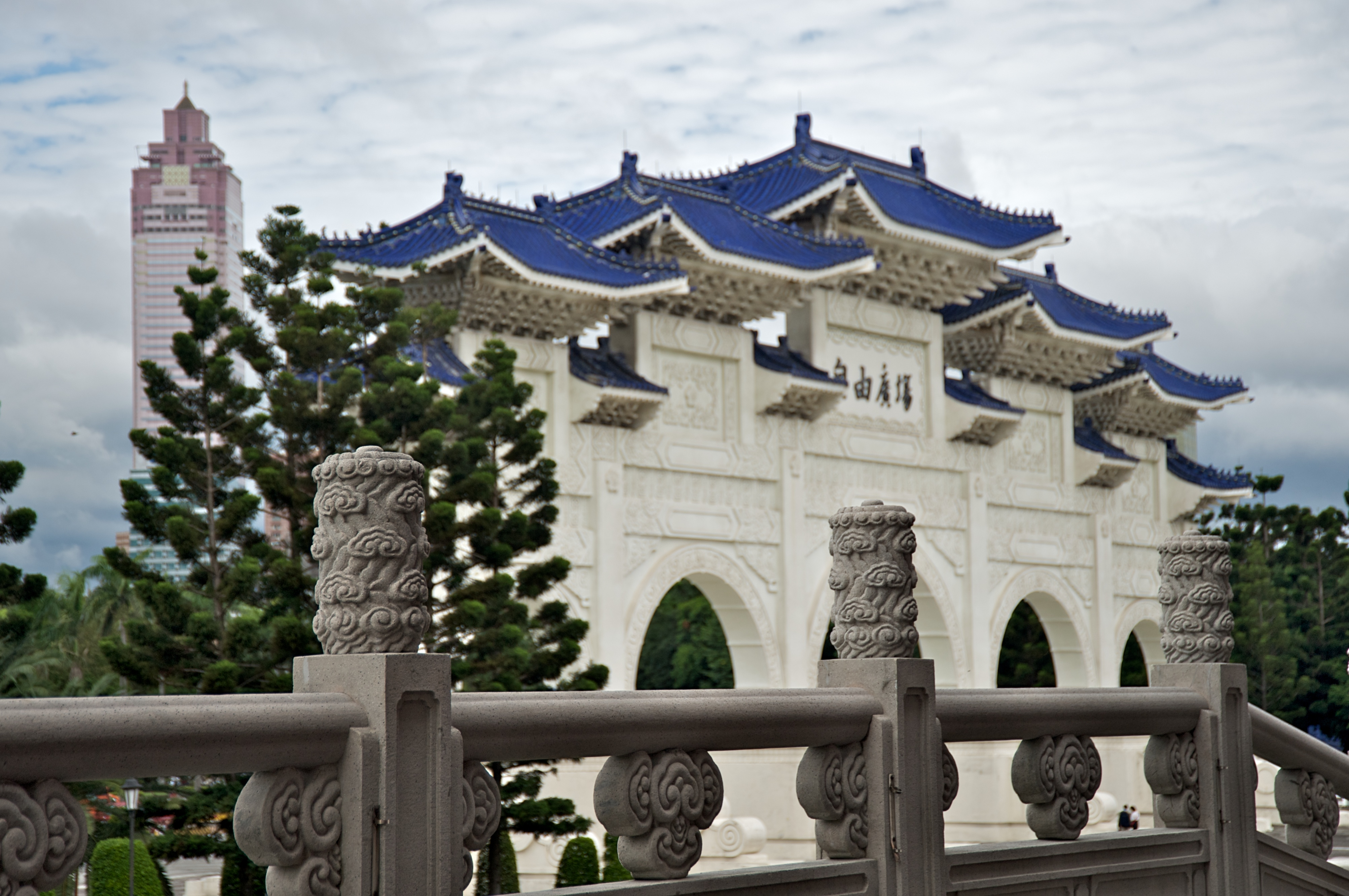
The railings at National Theater, Taipei City

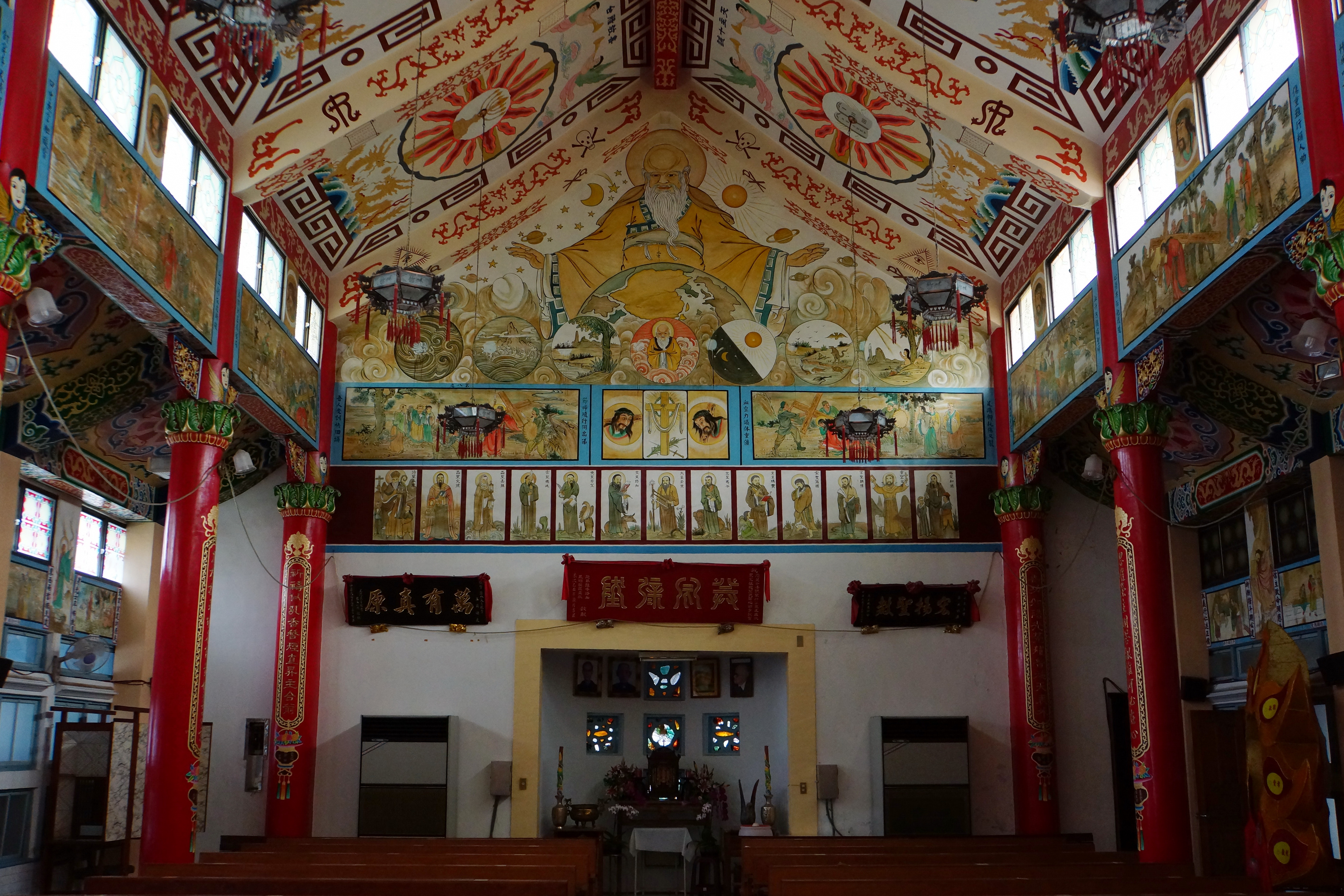
Yanshui Holy Spirit Church (鹽水天主聖神堂), Tainan City

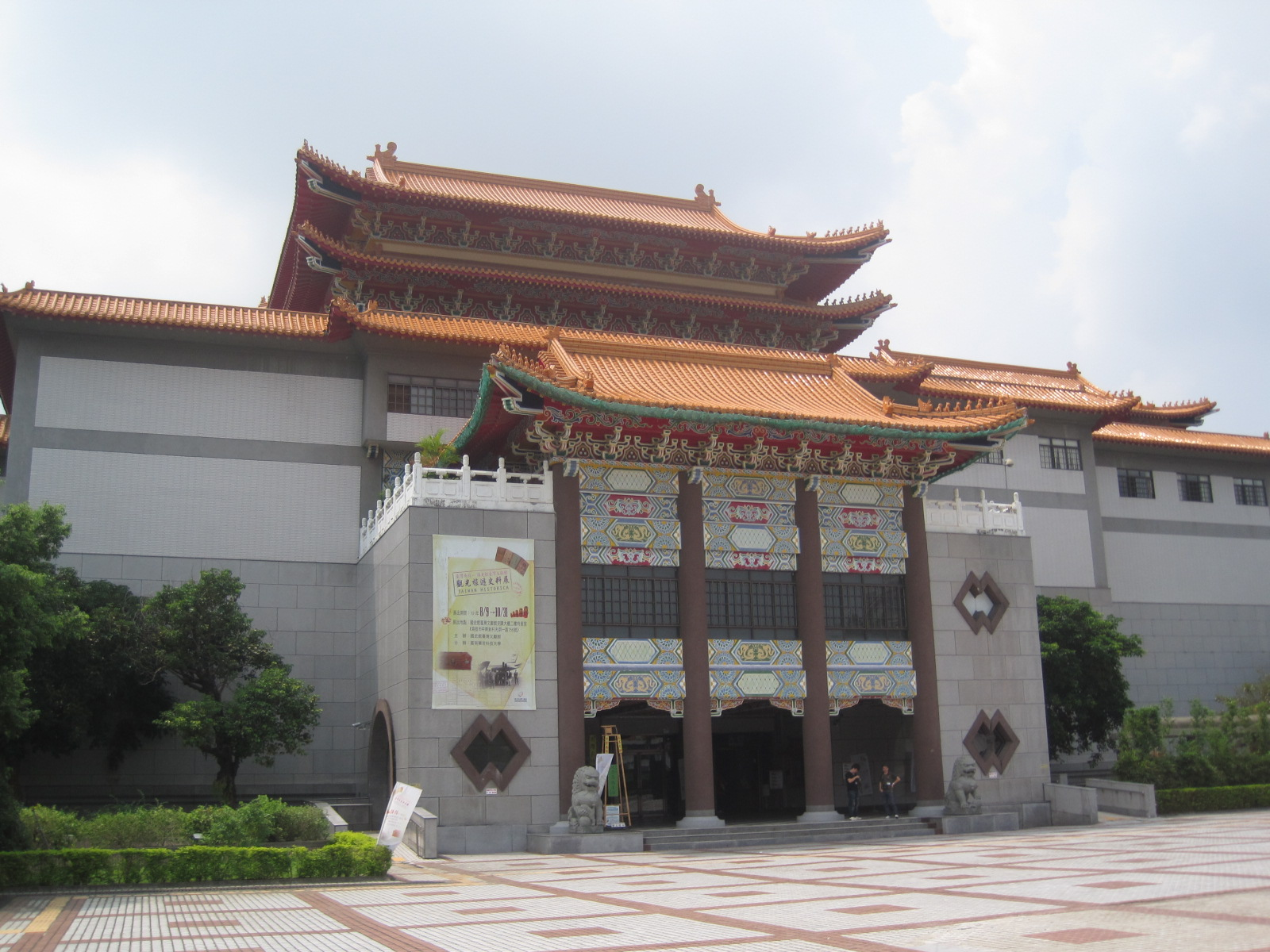
Taiwan Historica's Historical Documents Exhibition Hall

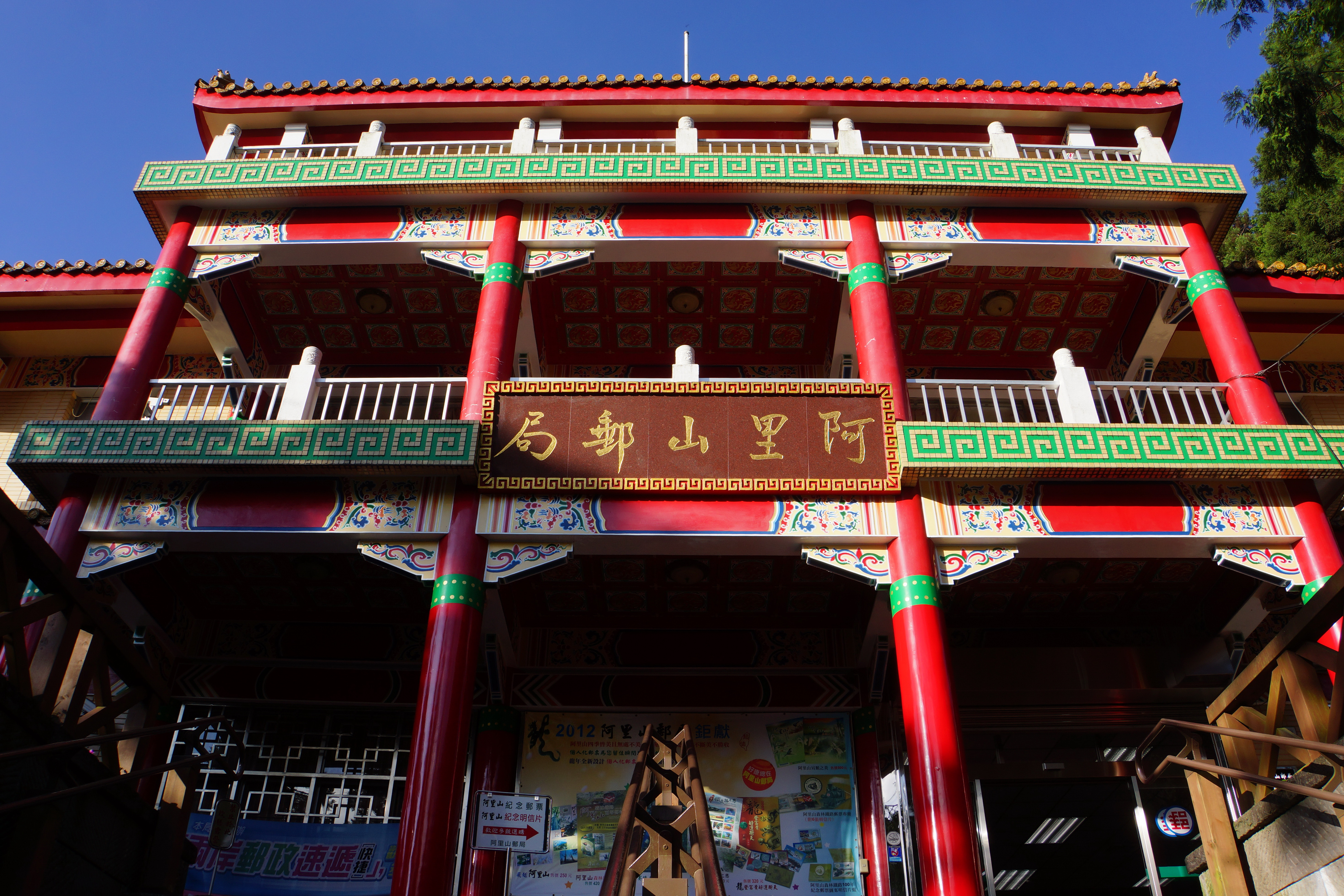
Alishan Post Office

Newly built traditional Taiwanese architecture

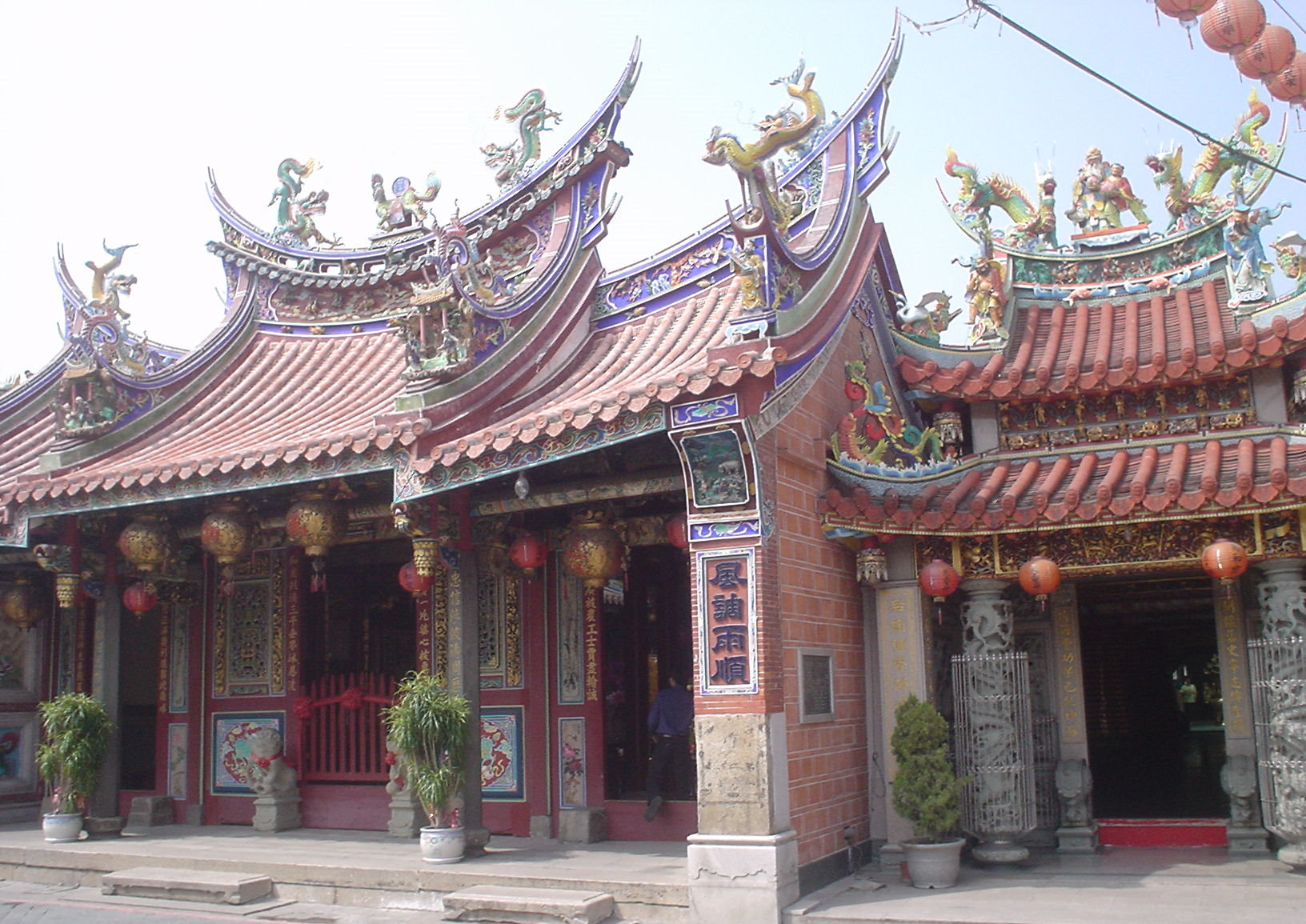
Wan He Temple, Taichung City (1684)

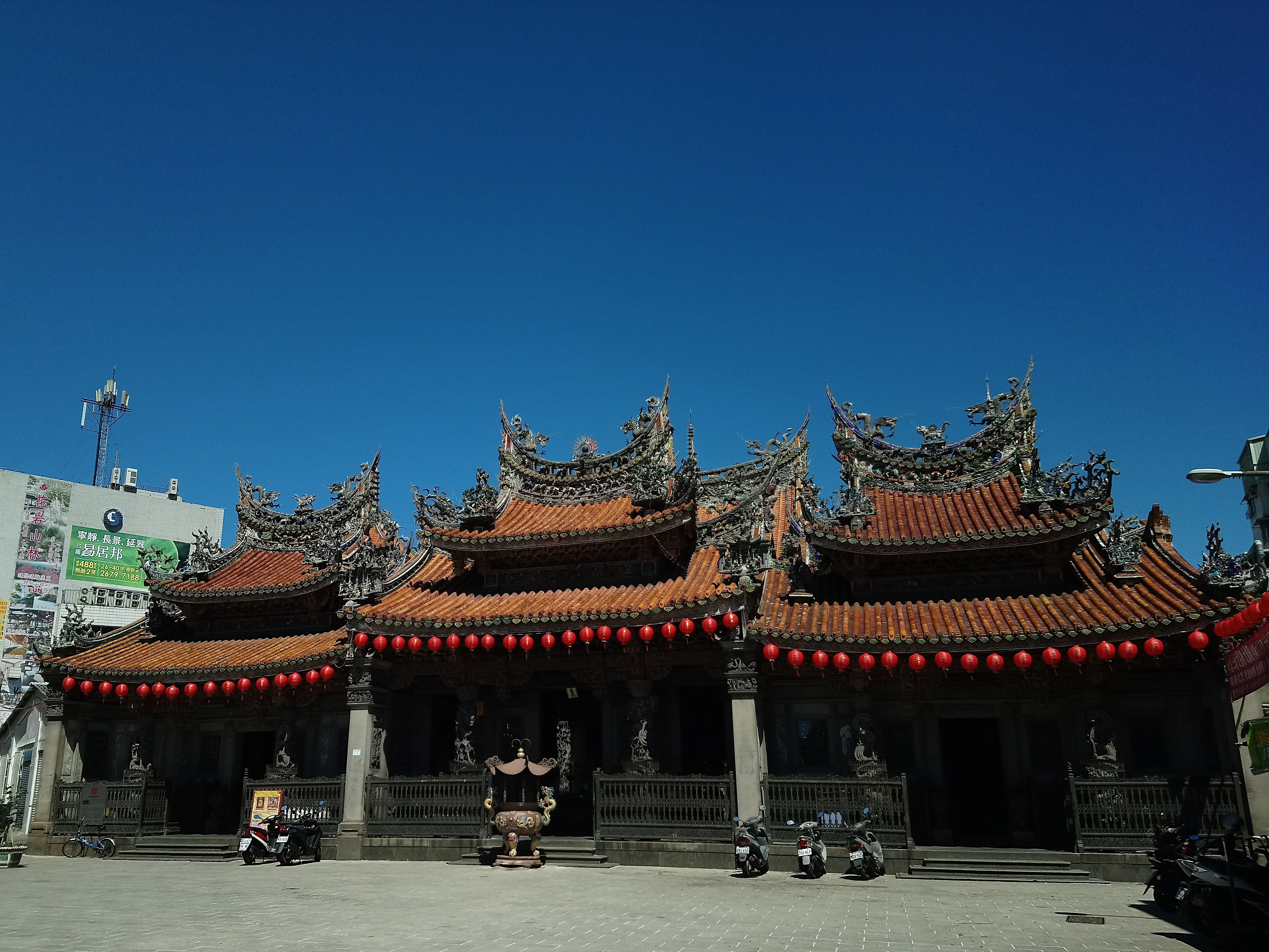
Changfu Temple, New Taipei City, rebuilt in 1947.

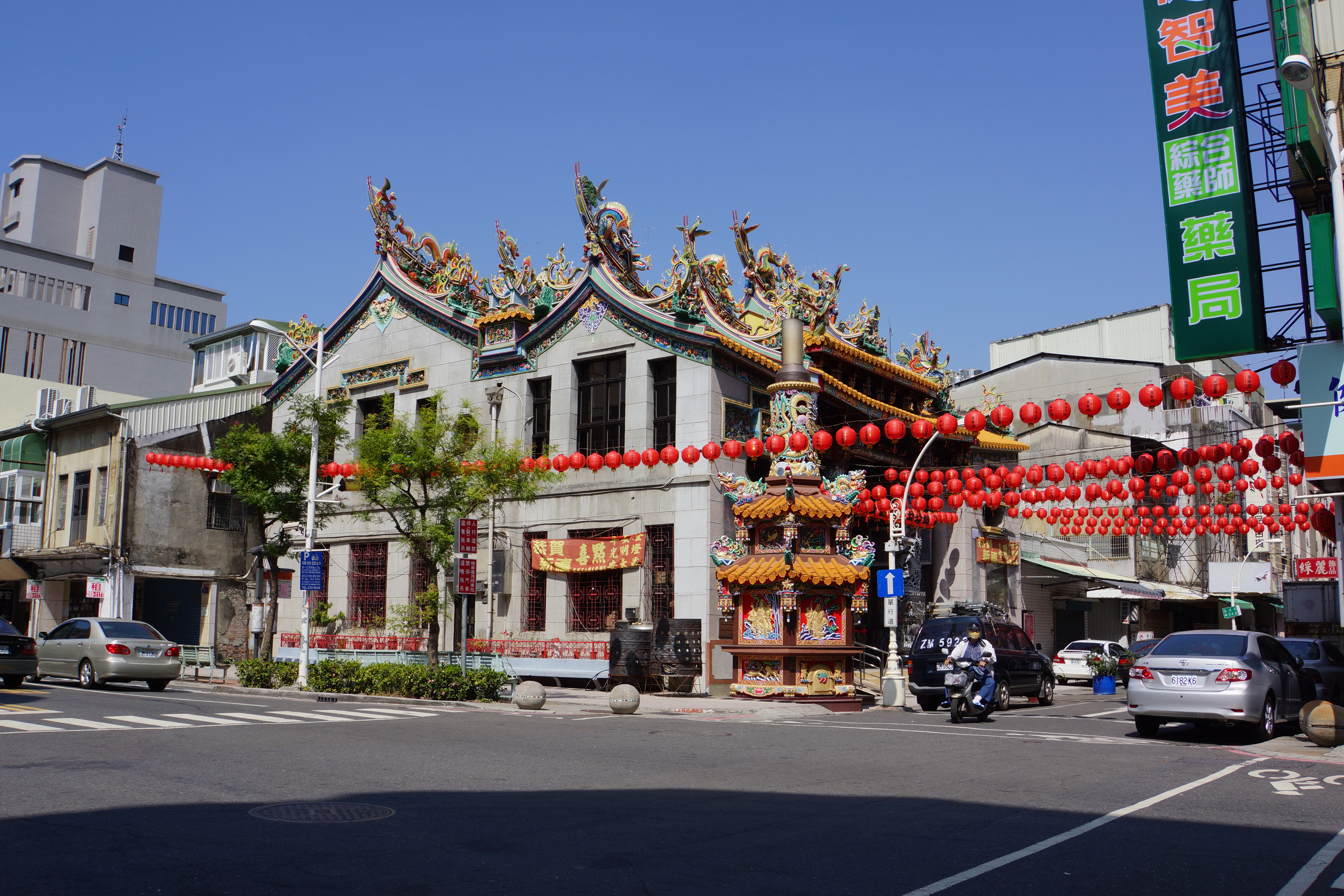
Yancheng Sanshan Guowang Temple (鹽埕三山國王廟), Kaohsiung City (1949)

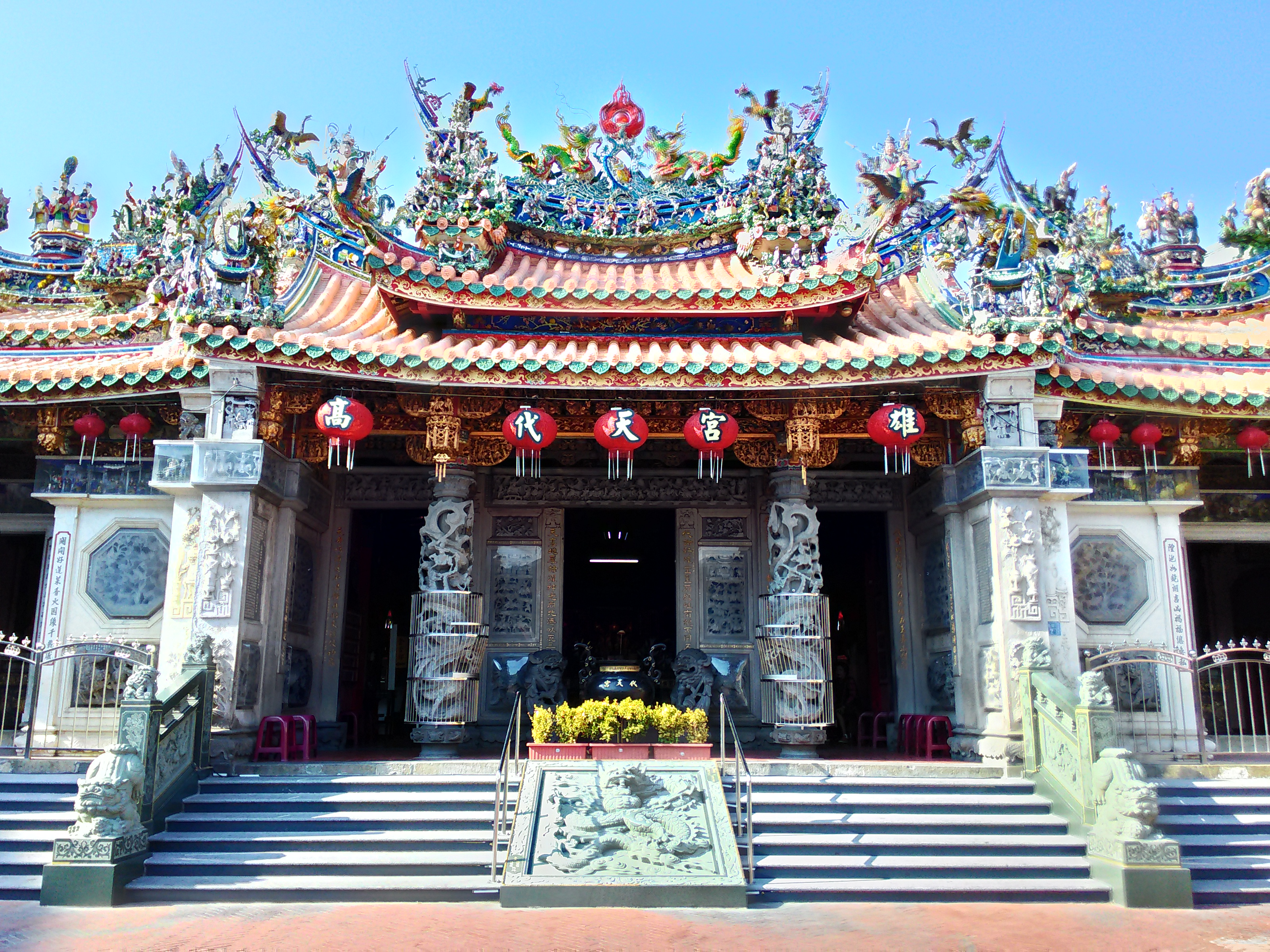
Gushan Daitian Temple, Kaohsiung City (1949–1951)

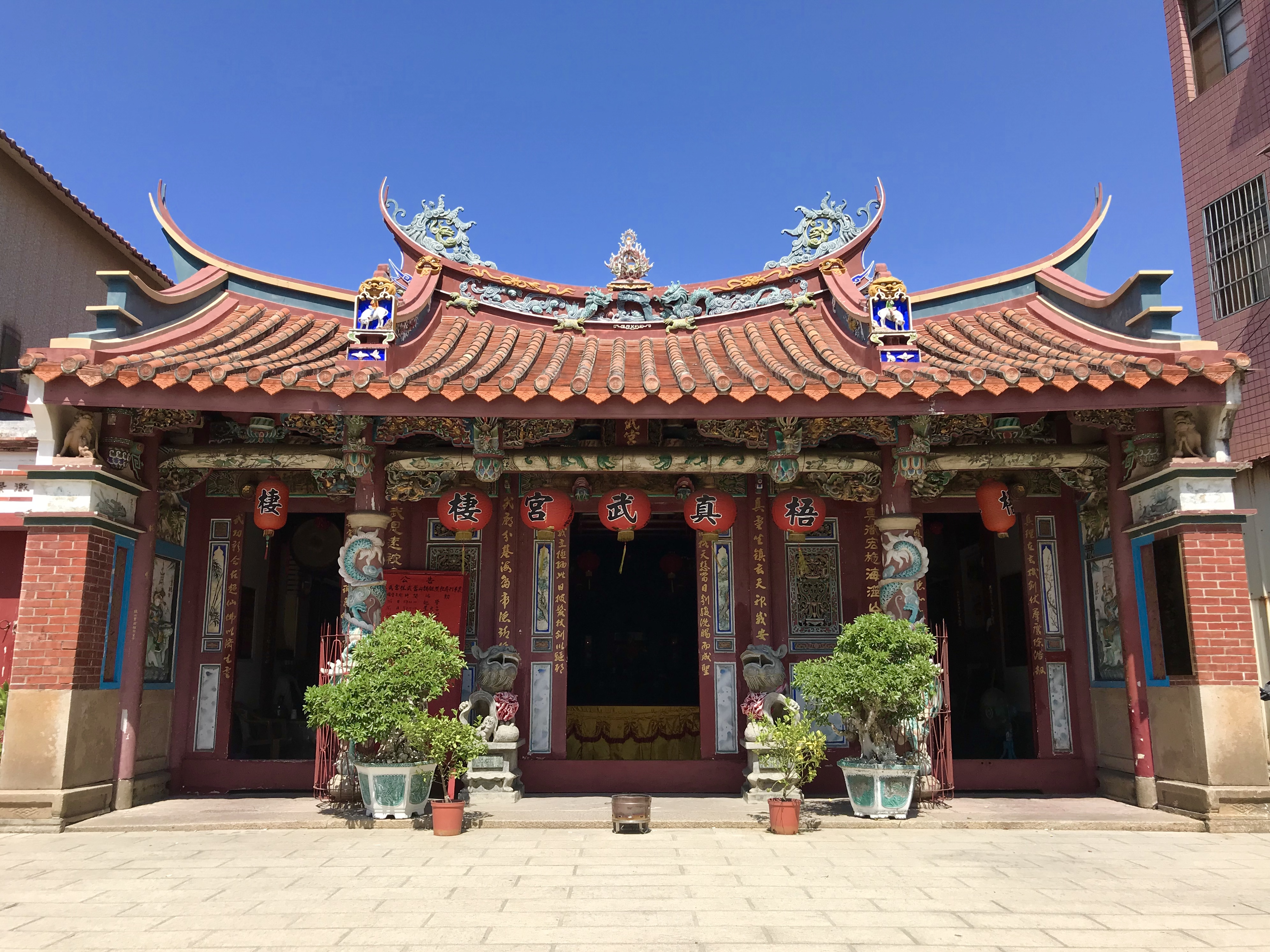
Wuqi Zhenwu Temple, Taichung City (1849), restored in 1953

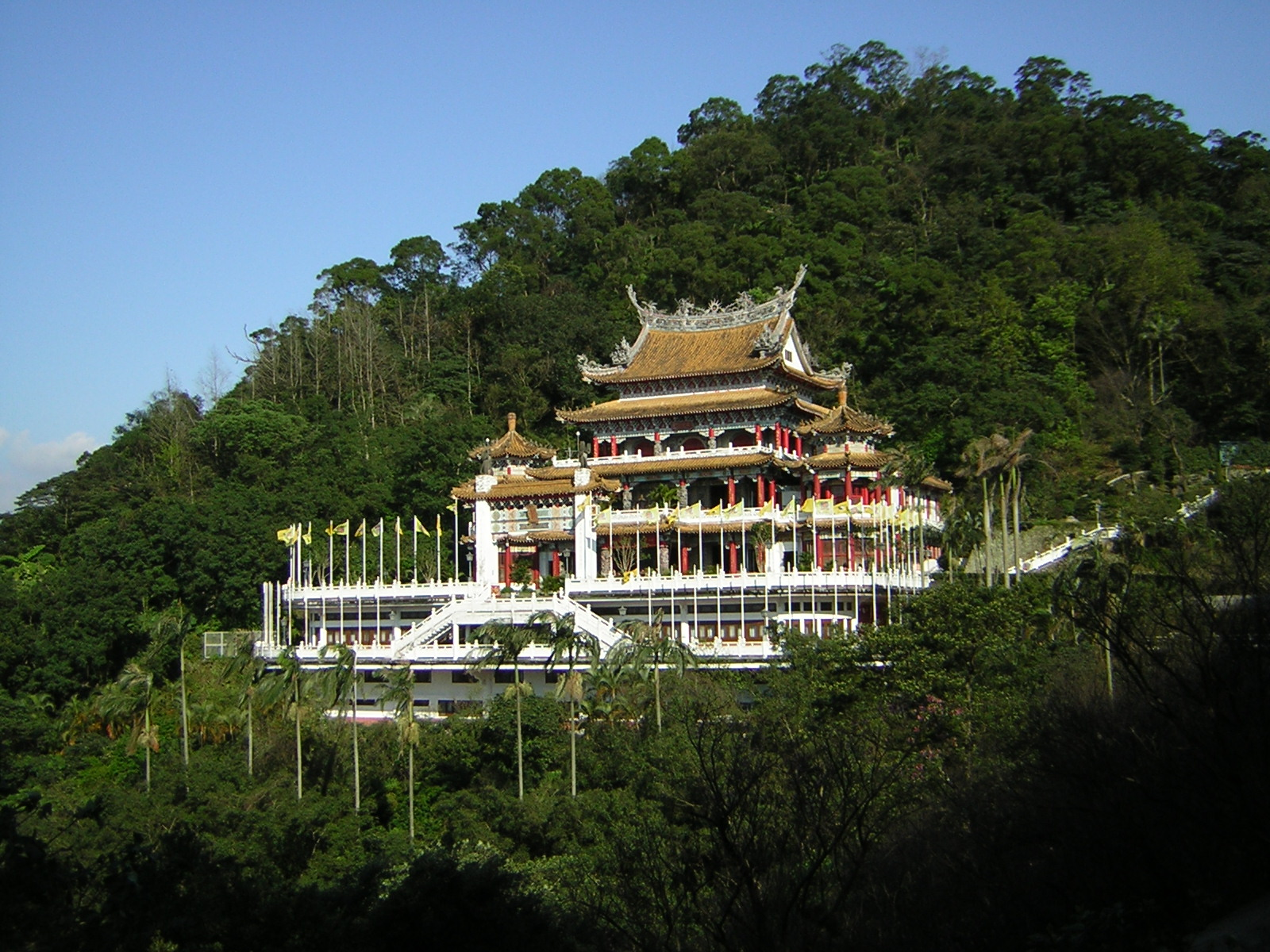
Lingxiao Chapel (凌霄寶殿) of Zhinan Temple (指南宮), Taipei City (1963)

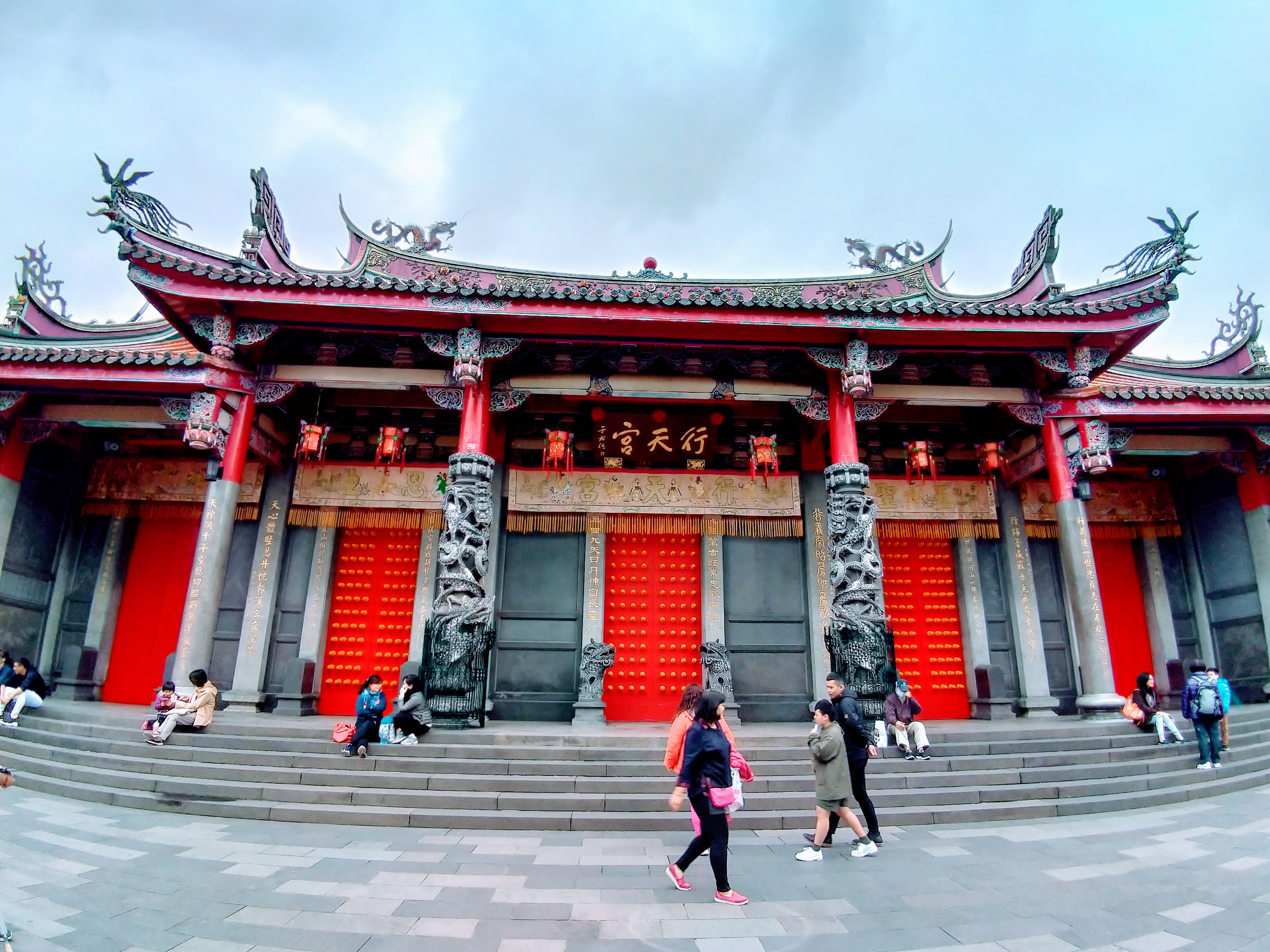
Xingtian Temple, Taipei City (1968)

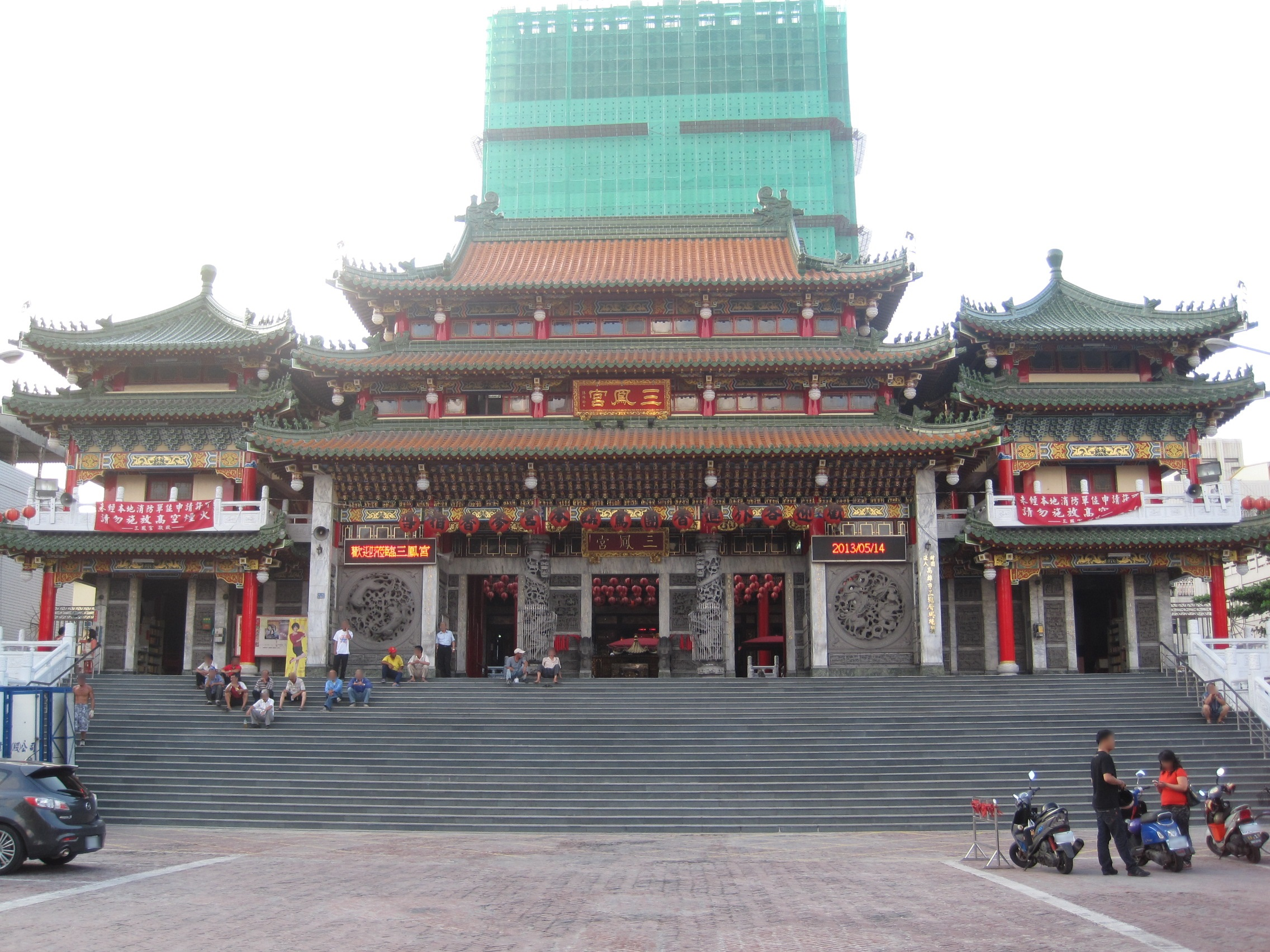
Sanfong Temple (三鳳宮), Kaohsiung City (1971)

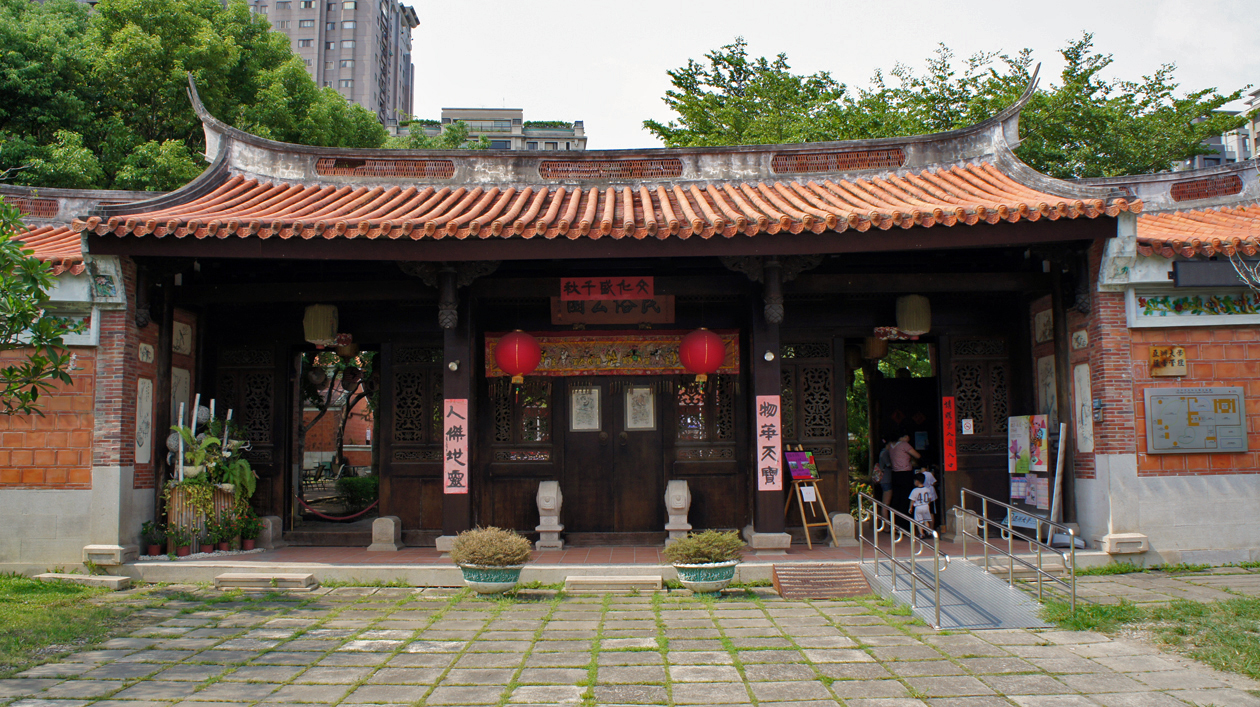
Taichung Folklore Park, Taichung City (1990)

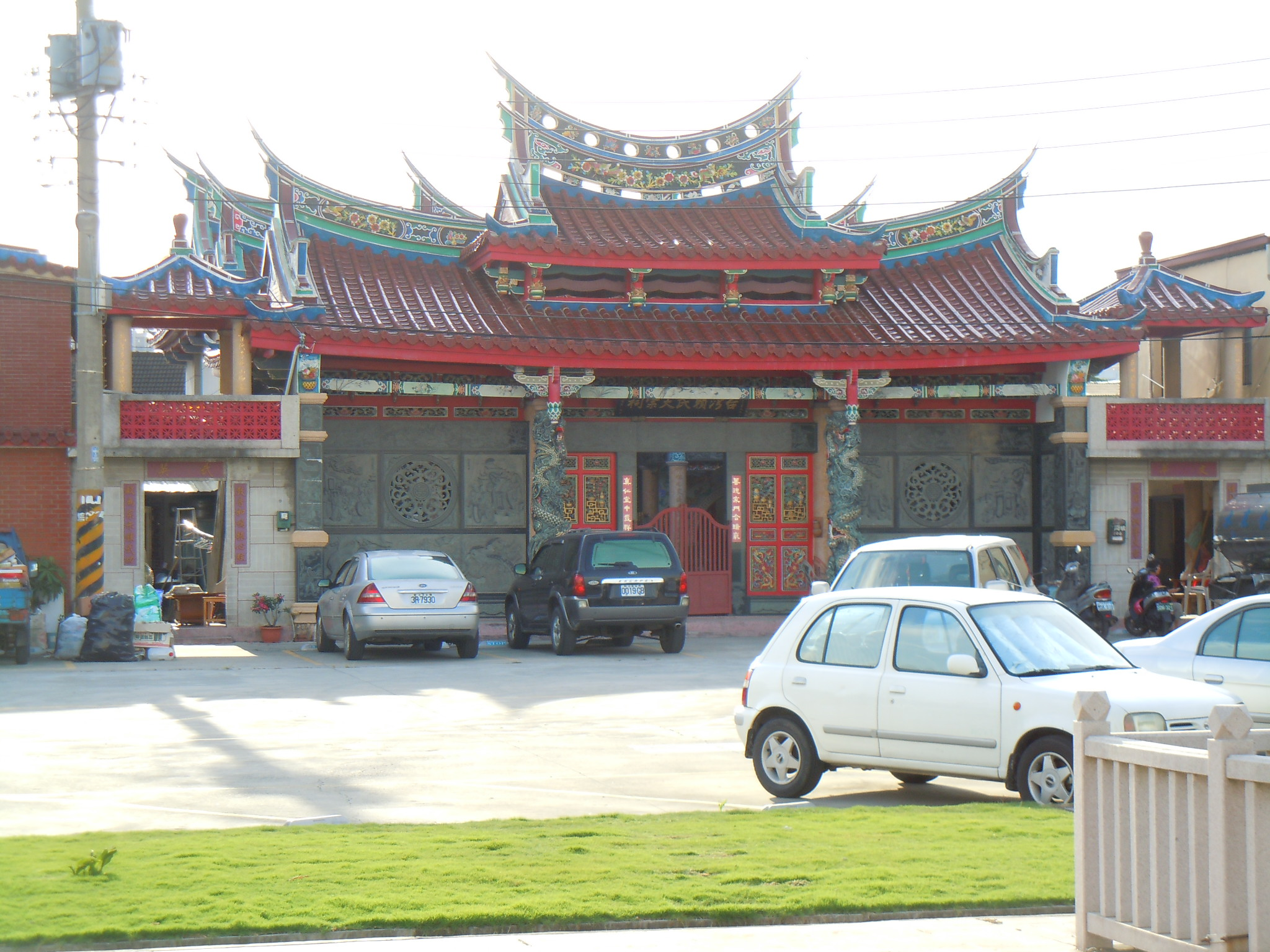
Taiwan Lai Family Ancestral Hall (台灣賴氏大宗祠), Taichung City (2006)

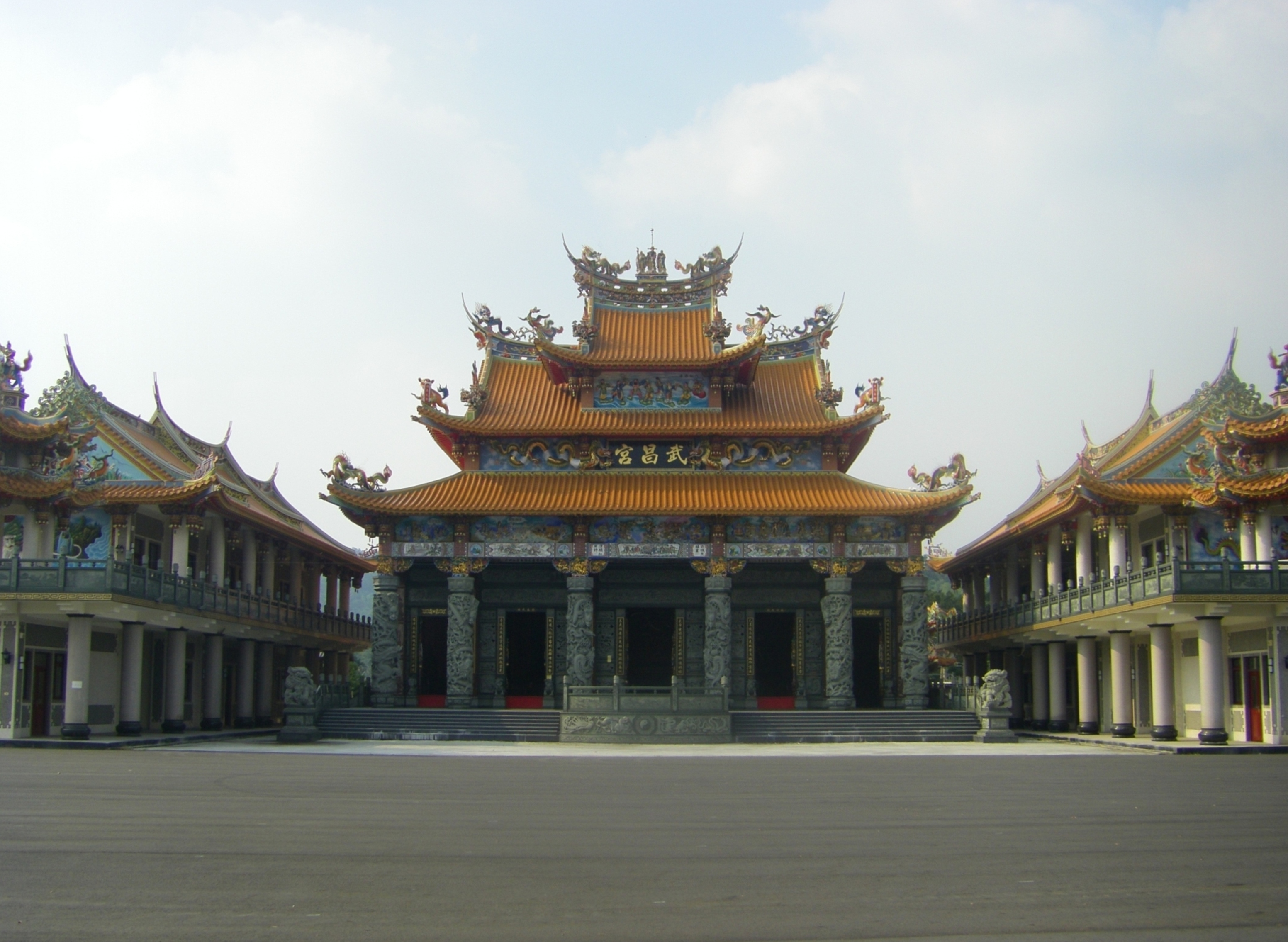
Wu Chang Temple (武昌宮), Nantou County (1903, rebuilt 2010)

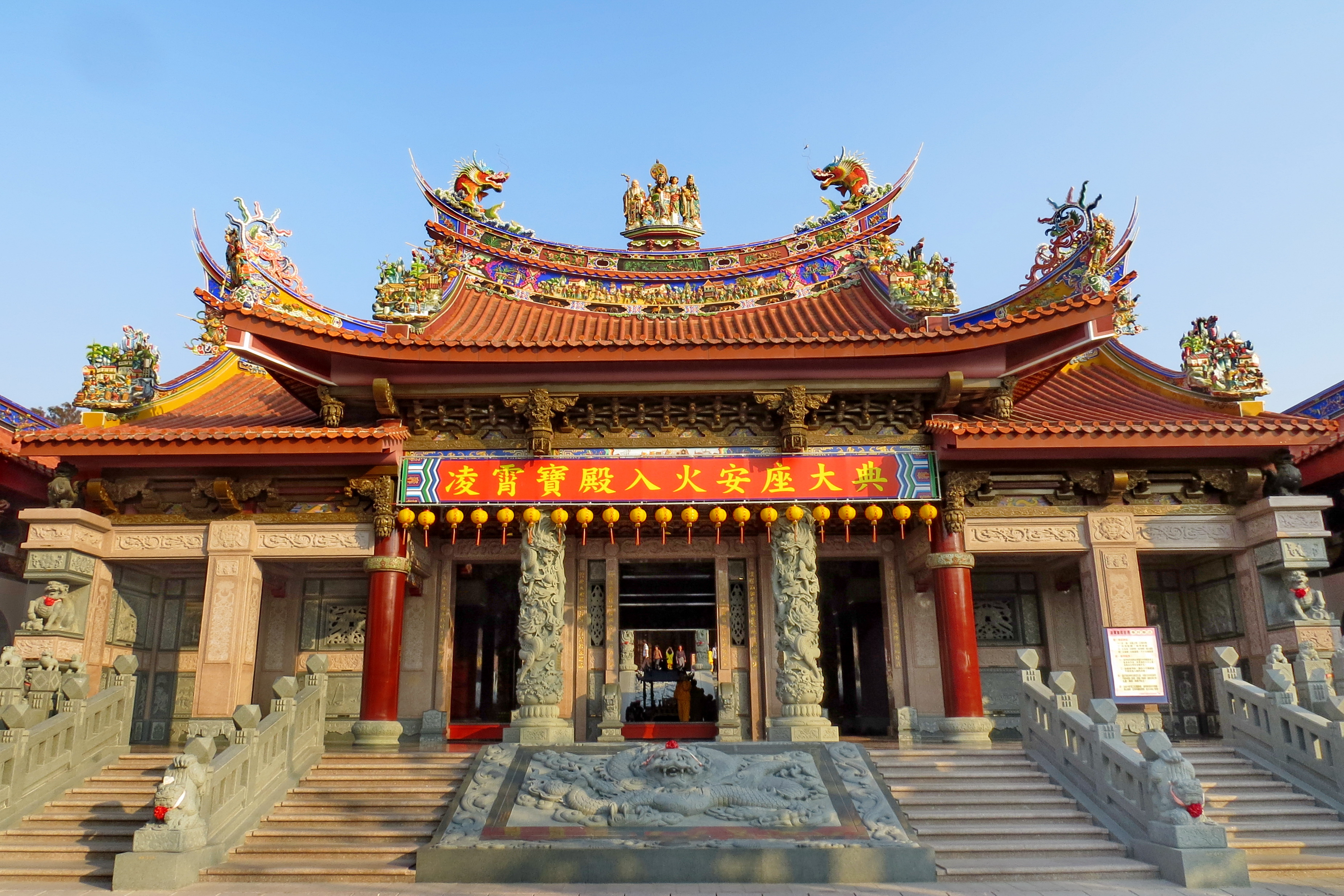
Lingxiao Main Hall (凌霄寶殿) of Nankunshen Daitian Temple (南鯤鯓代天府), Tainan City (2012)

Modern architecture

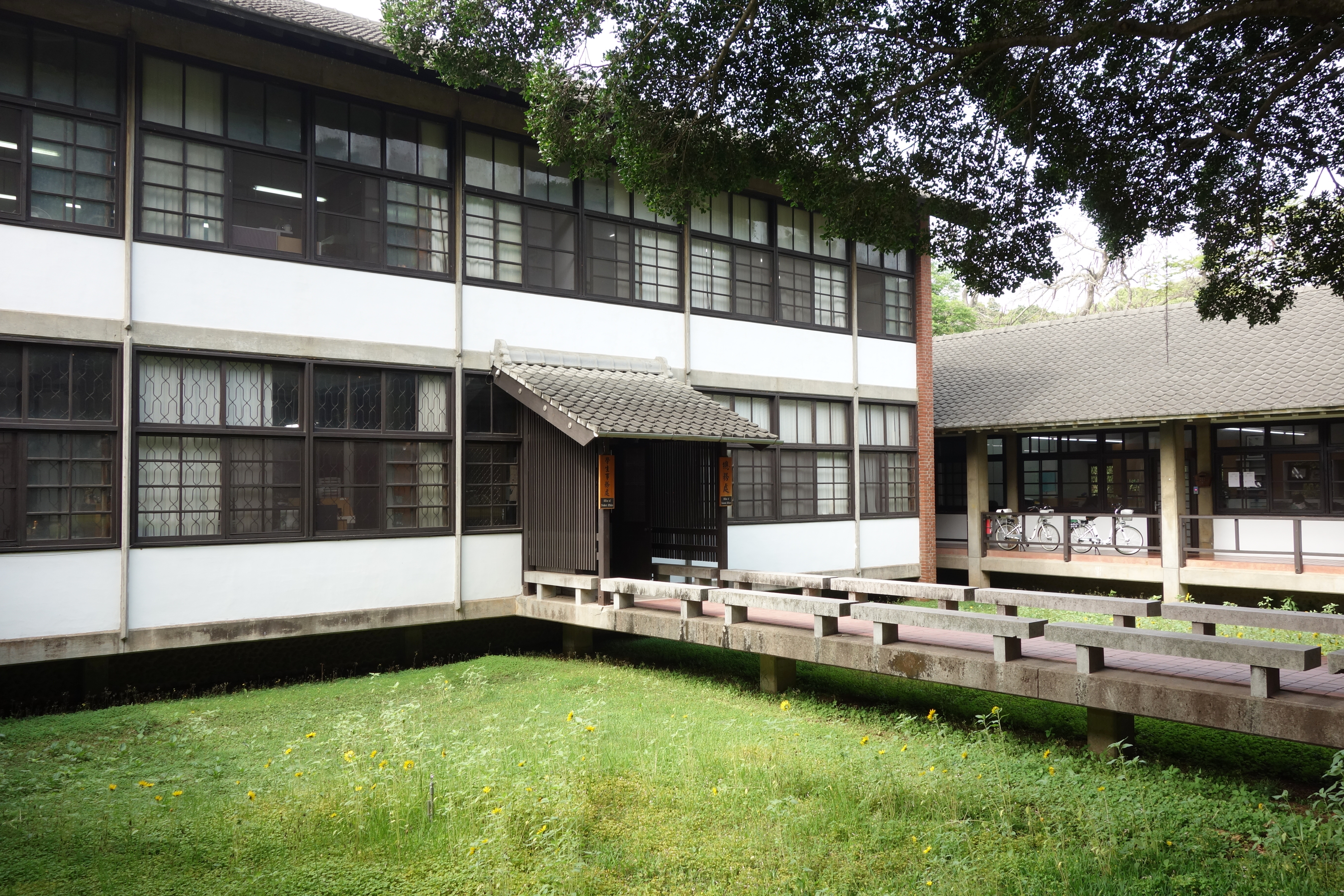
Administration of Tunghai University, Taiching City (1957), designed by Chen Chi-kwan.

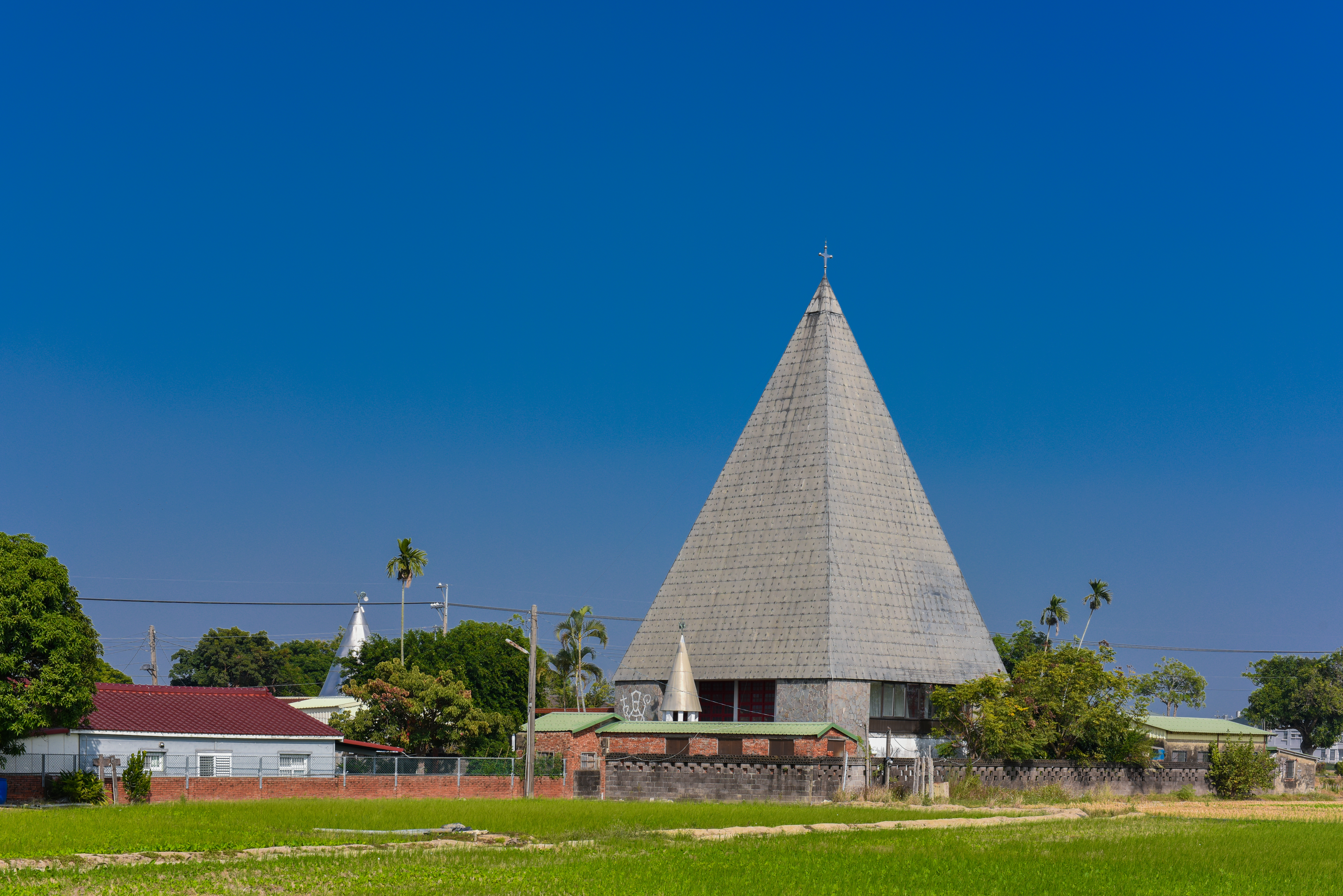
Saint Cross Church, Tainan City (1960), designed by Gottfried Boehm.

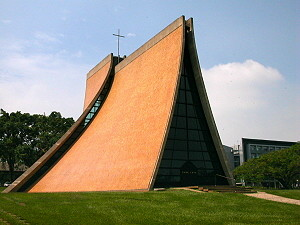
Tunghai University Luce Memorial Chapel, Taichung City(1963), designed by I. M. Pei and Chen Chi-kwan.

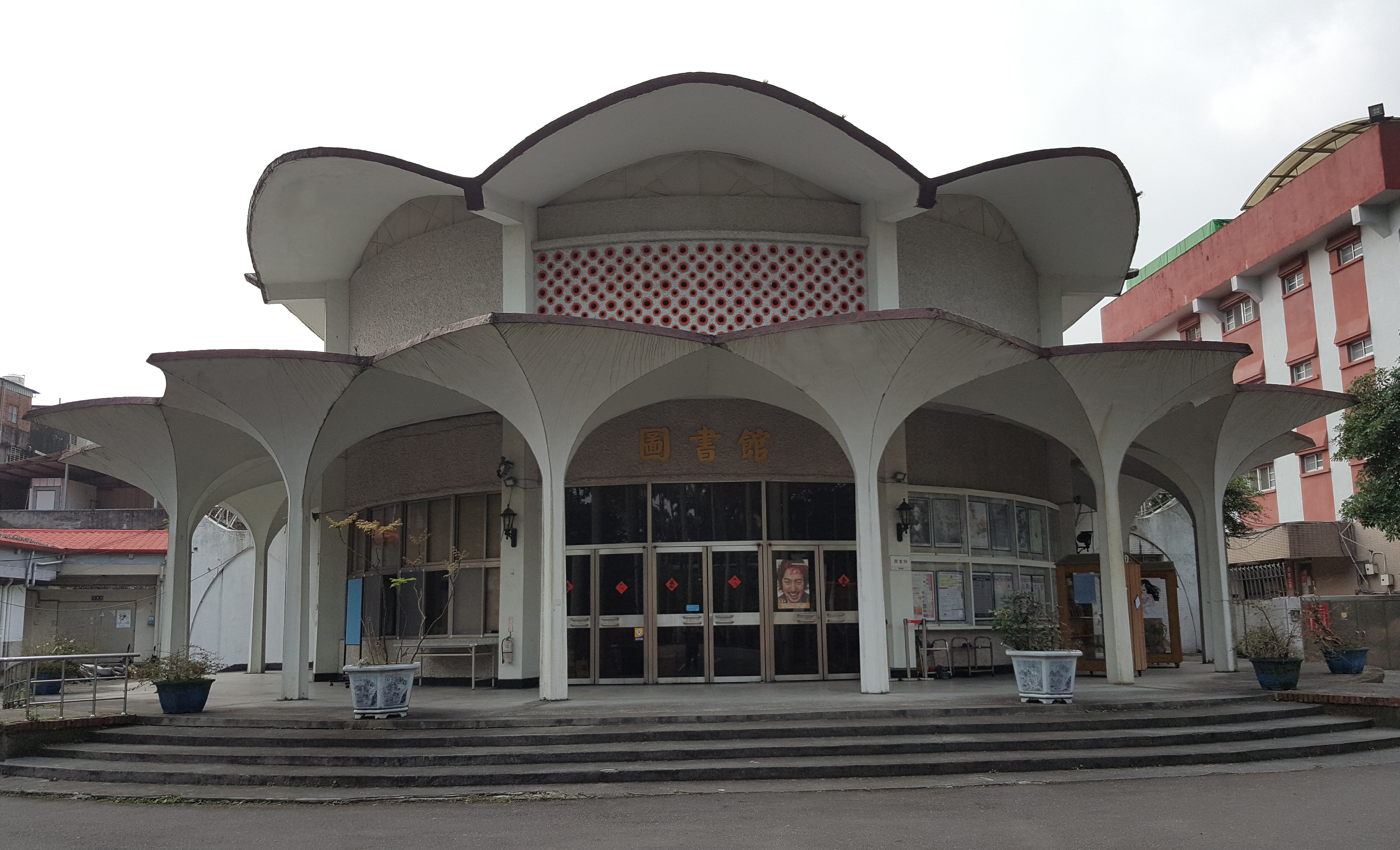
Library of Taipei Municipal Jingmei Girls' High School (台北市景美女中圖書館), Taipei City, designed by Xiu Zelan.

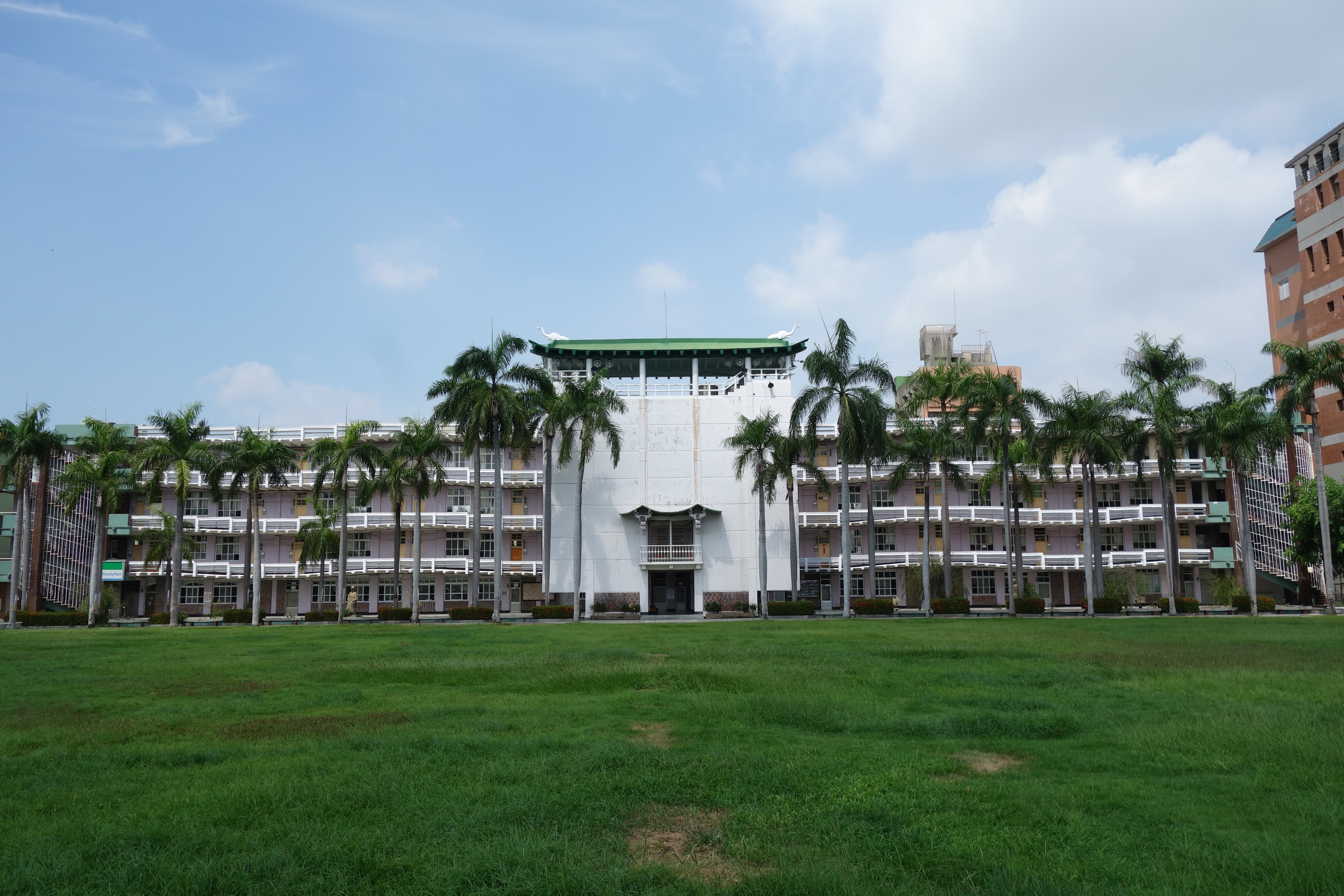
The Wave Classroom (波浪大樓) of Sansin High School of Commerce And Home Economics, Kaohsiung City (1964), designed by Jen-Ho Chen (陳仁和).

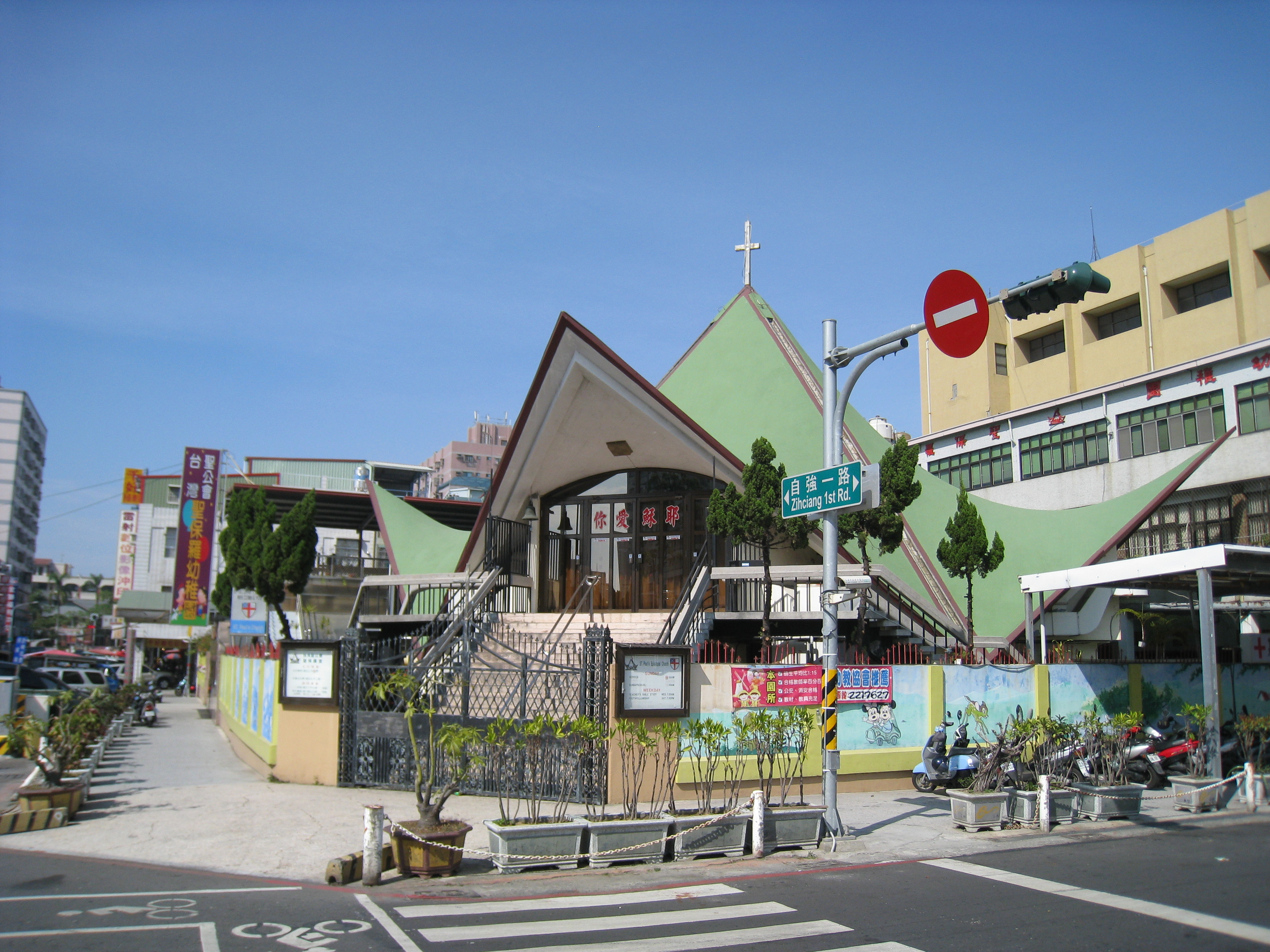
St Paul's Church (聖公會聖保羅堂), Kaohsiung City (1965), designed by Chen Chi-kwan and Haigo T. H. Shen(沈祖海).

Asia Cement Building (亞洲水泥大樓), Taipei City (1966), designed by Wang Da-hong.

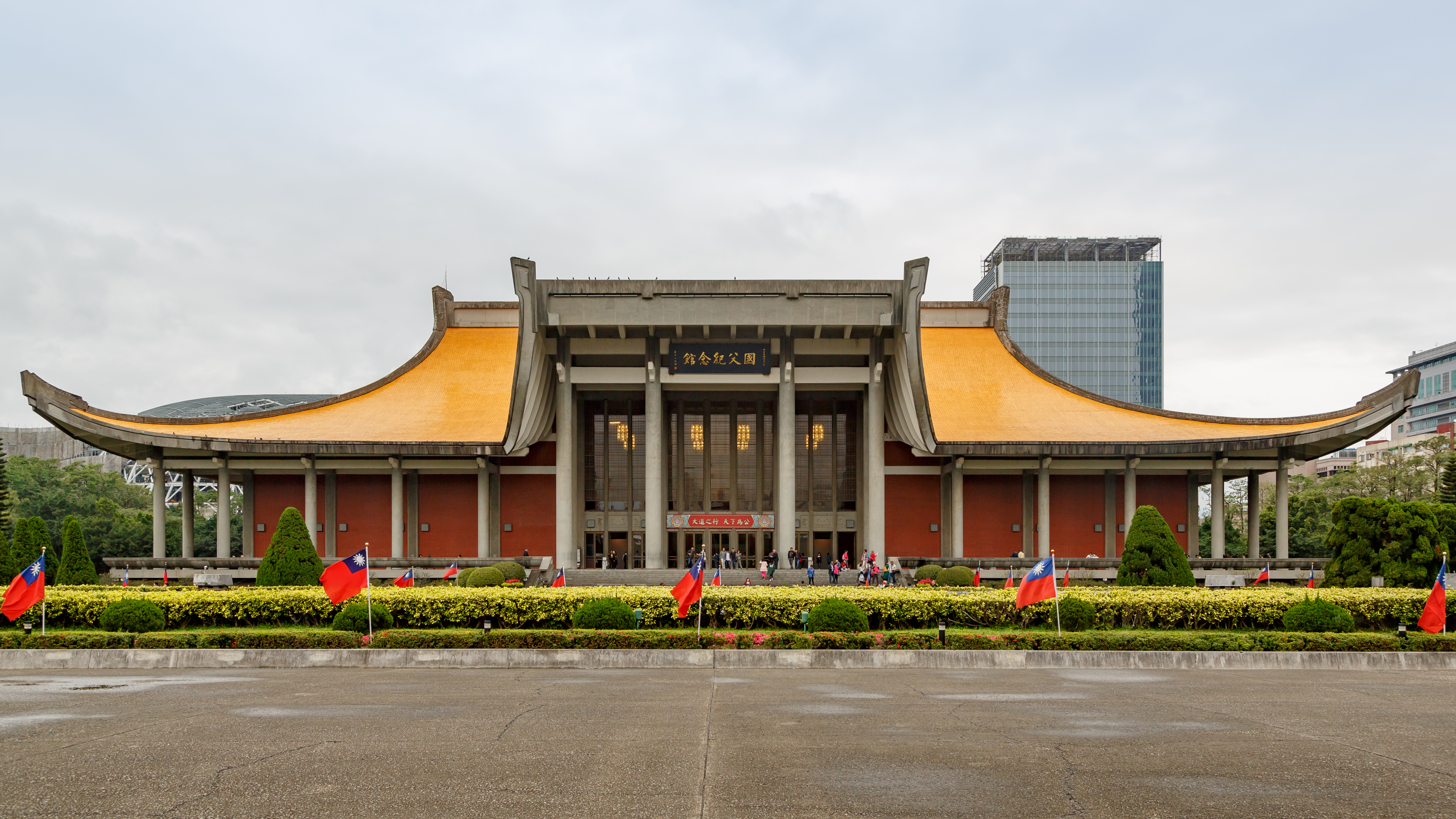
Sun Yat-sen Memorial Hall, Taipei City (1972), designed by Wang Da-hong.

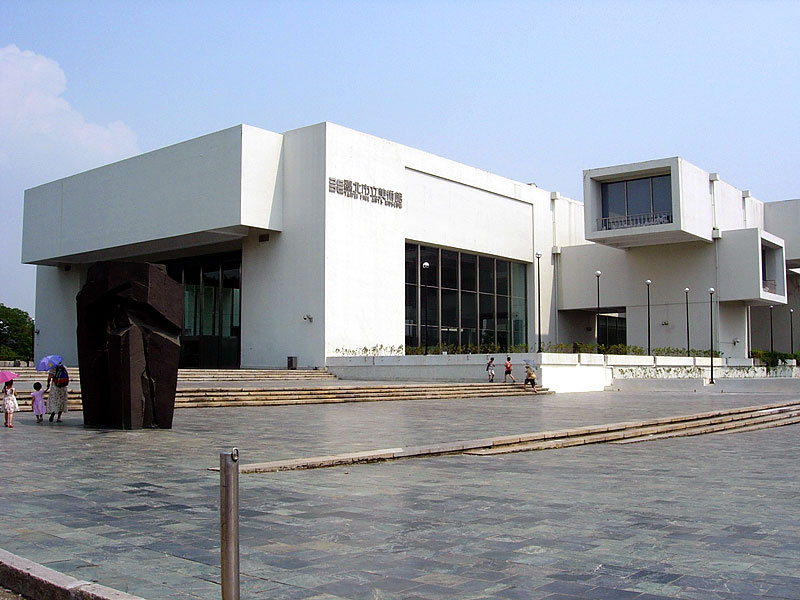
Taipei Fine Arts Museum, Taipei City(1983)

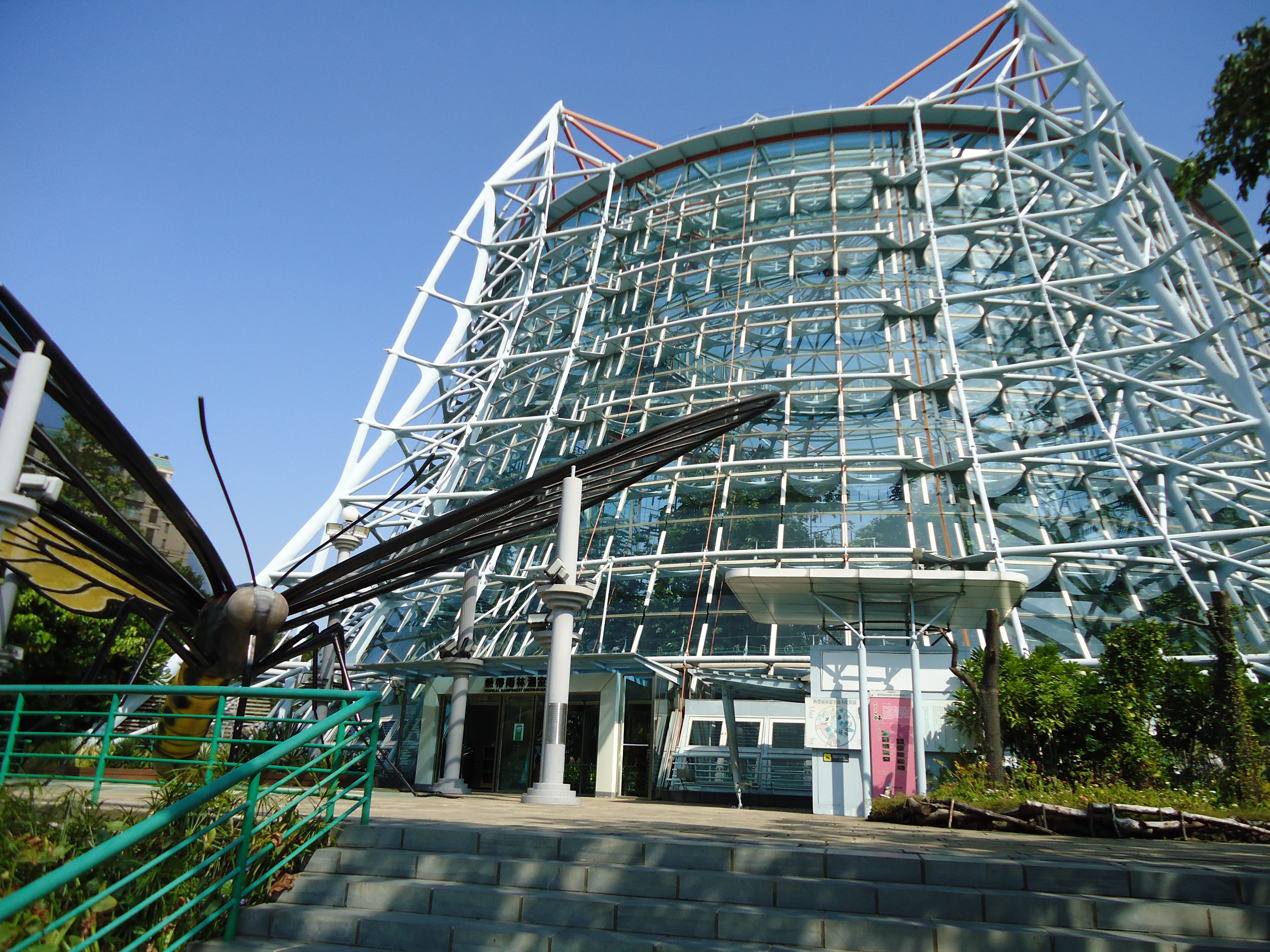
National Museum of Natural Science, Taichung City (1986)

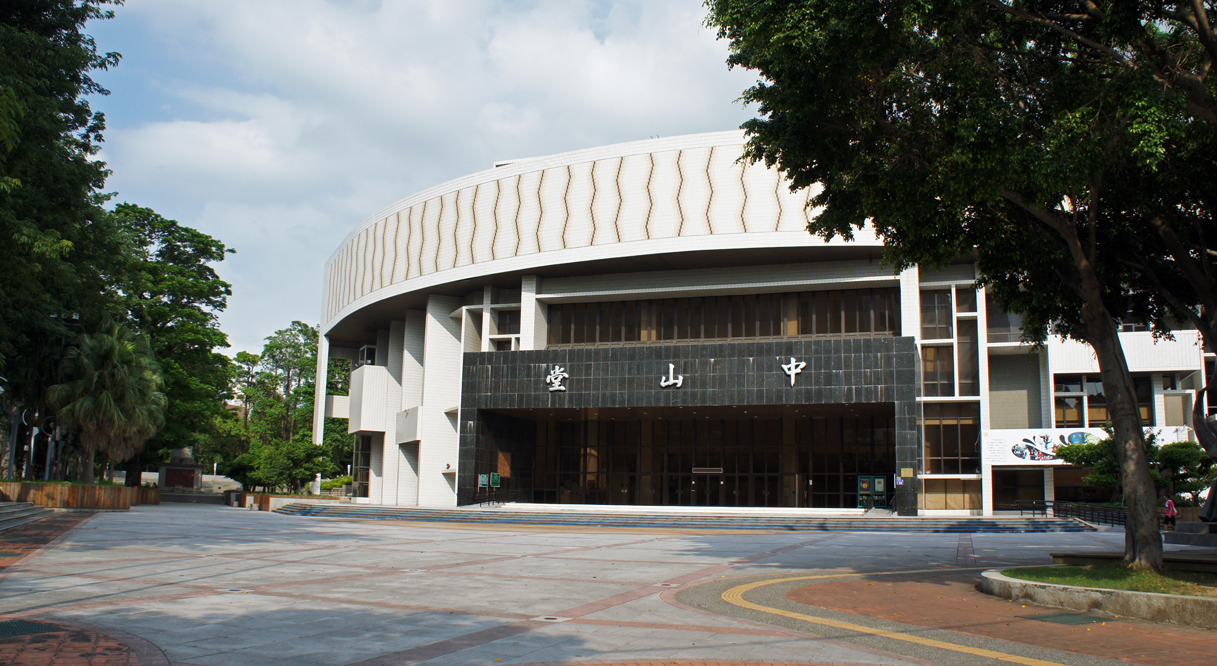
Chung Shan Hall (中山堂), Taichung City (1989)

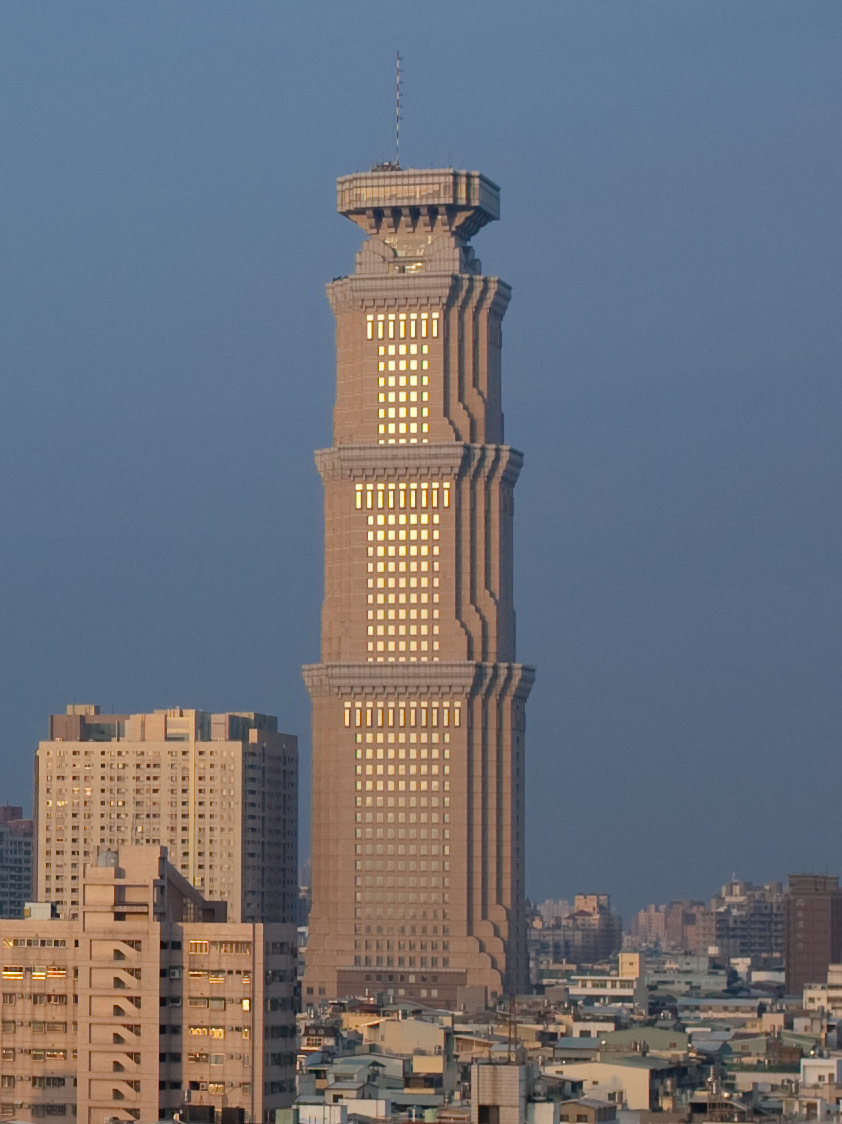
Chang-Gu World Trade Center, Kaohsiung City (1992)

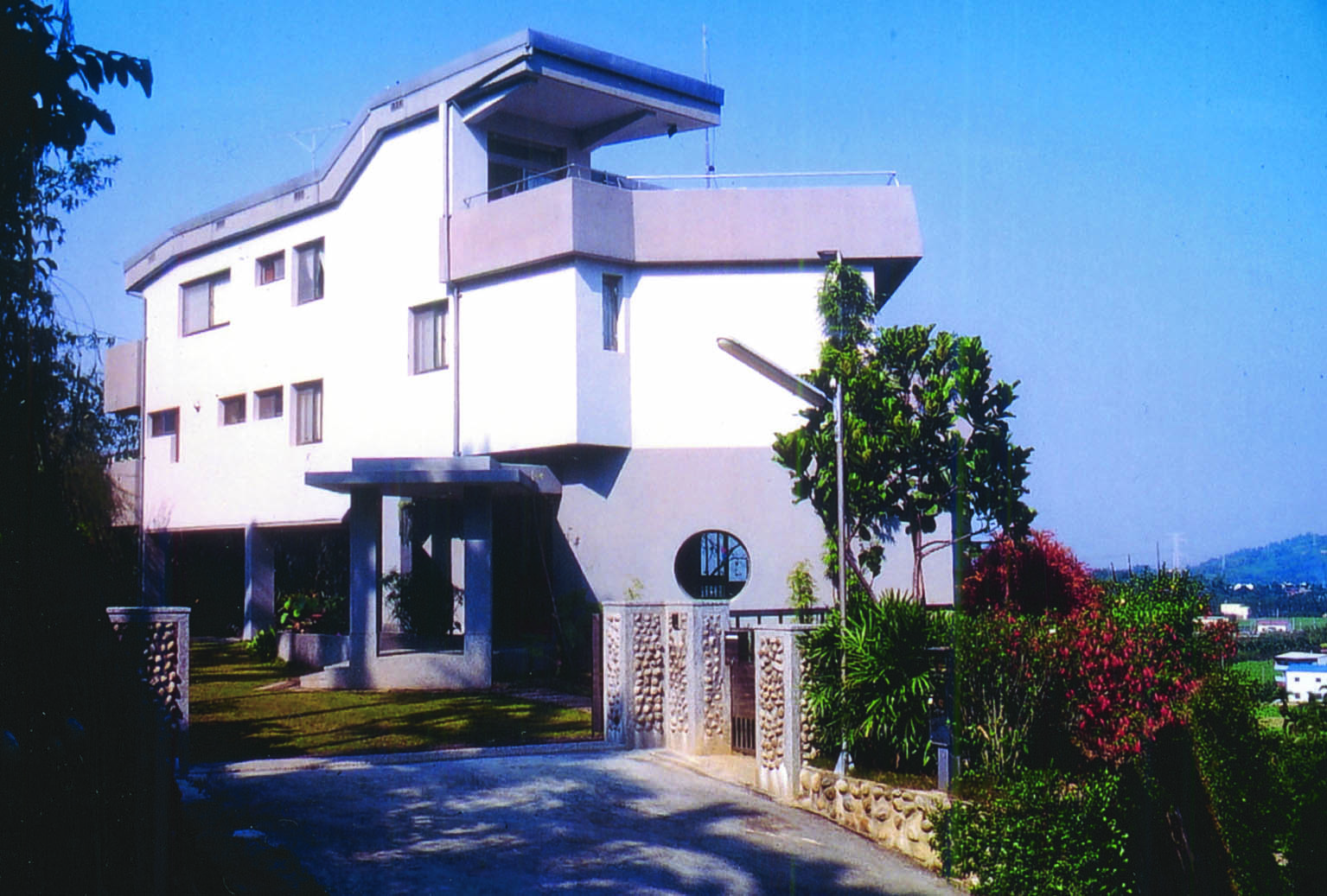
Haus Lin in Nanpu (南埔林宅), Nantou County (1997), designed by Chen Kuen Lee.

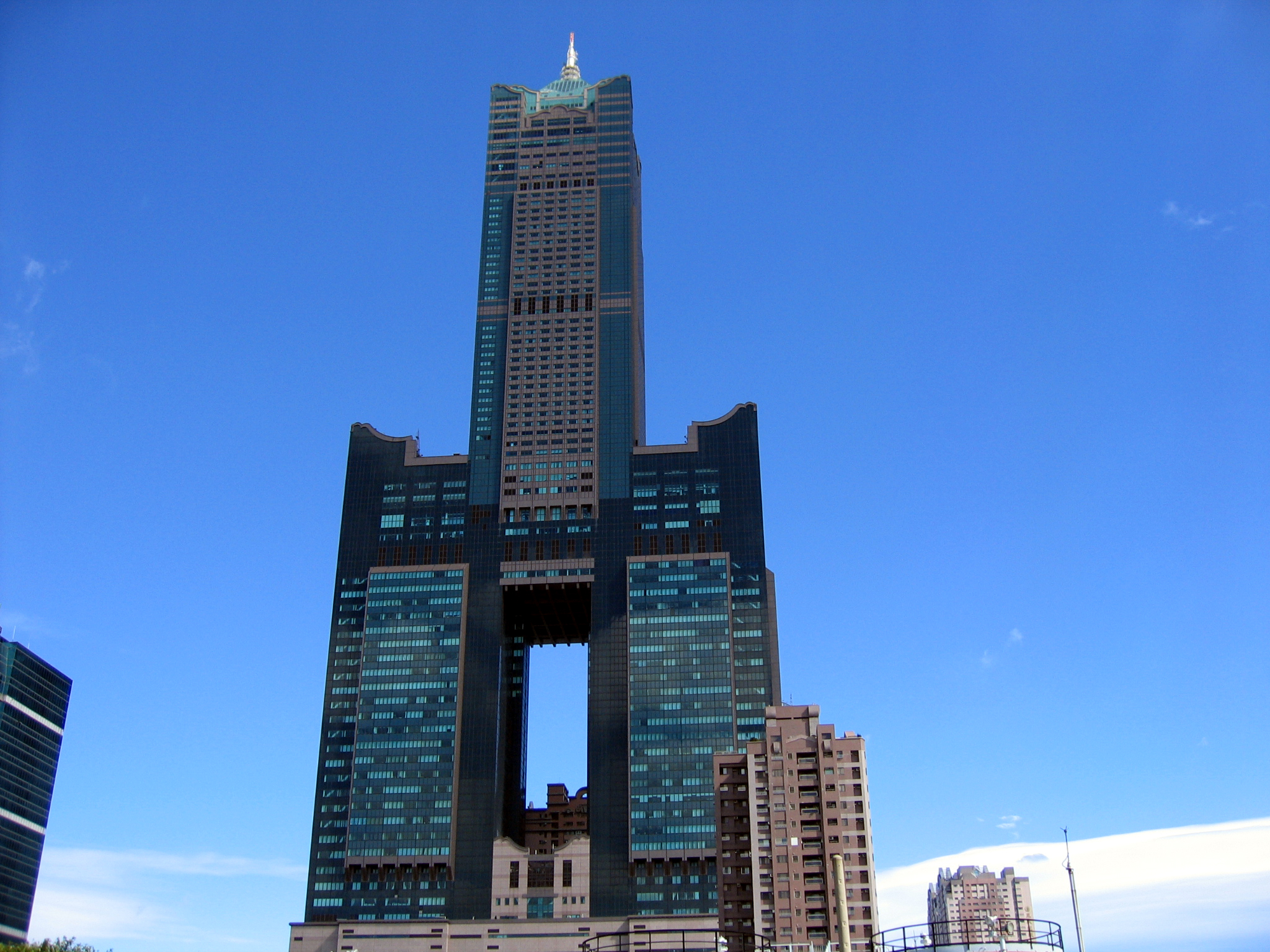
85 Sky Tower, Kaohsiung City (1997)

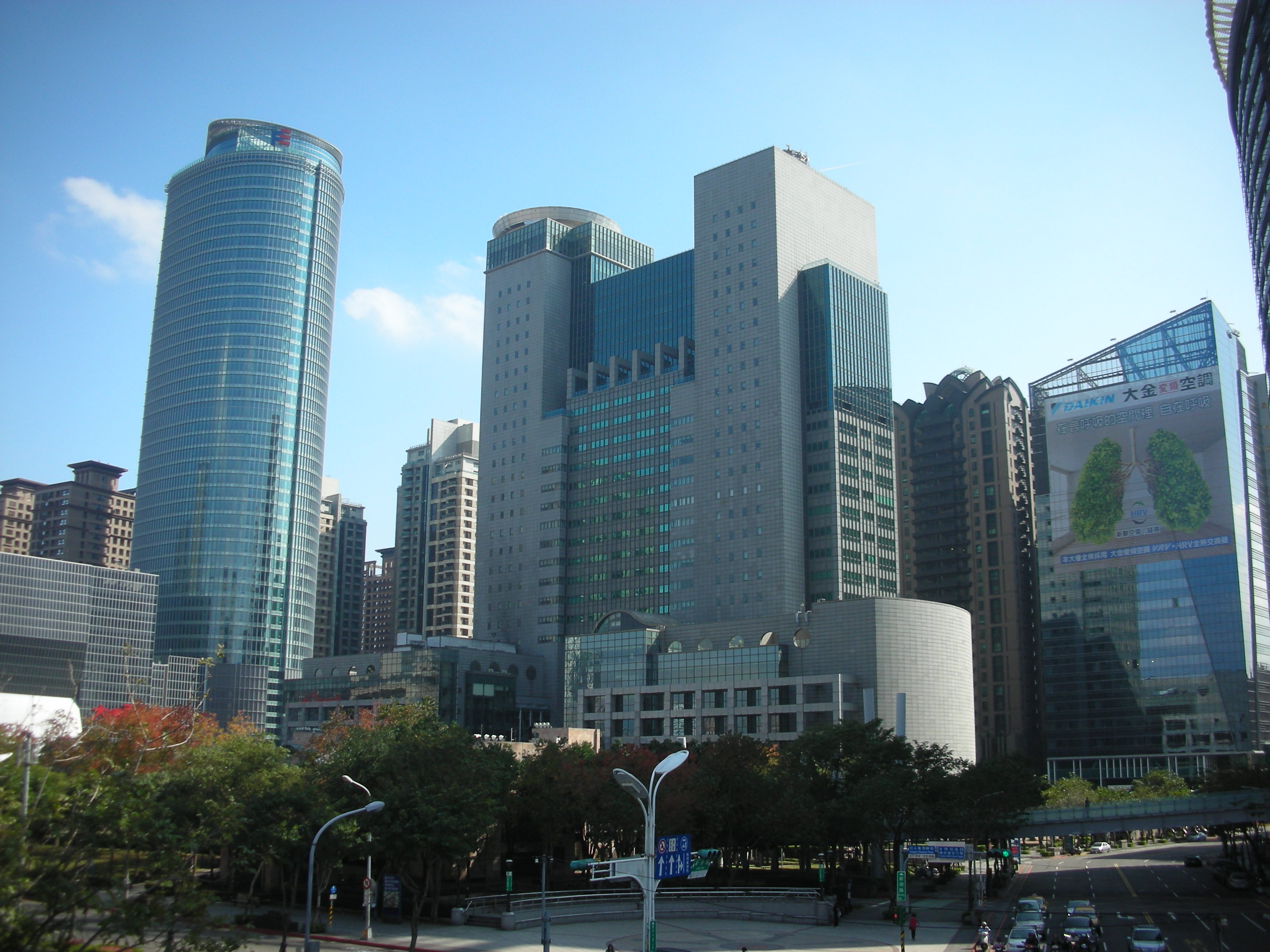
New Taipei City Hall, New Taipei City (2003)

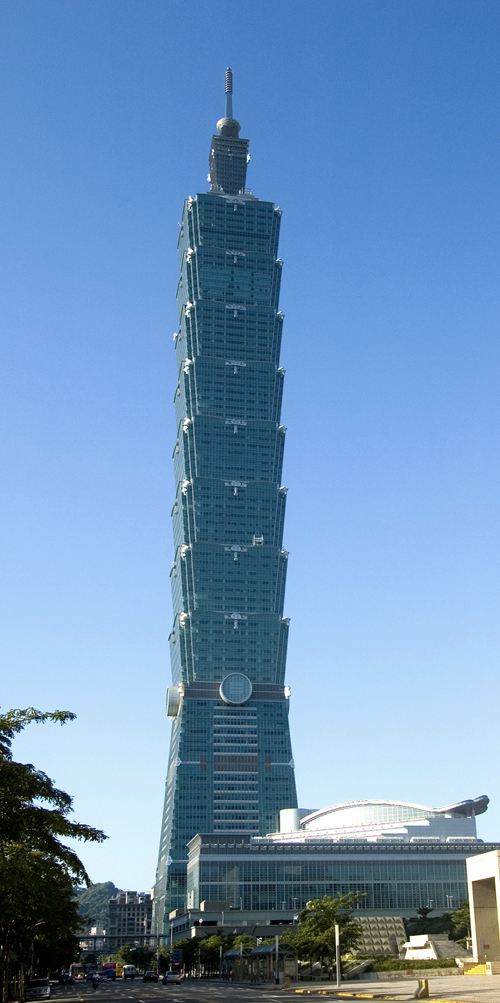
Taipei 101, Taipei City (2004)

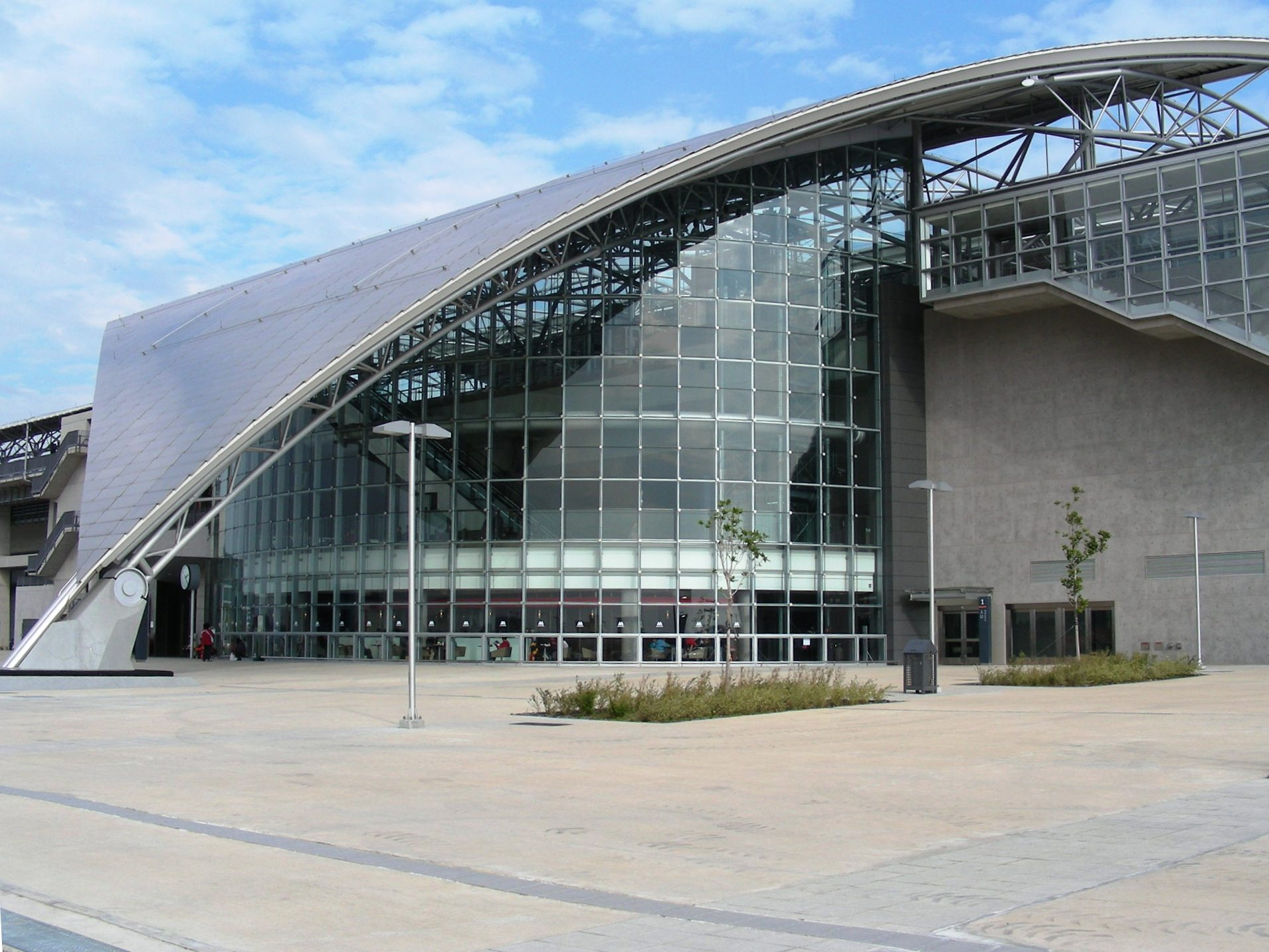
Hsinchu HSR station, Hsinchu County (2006)

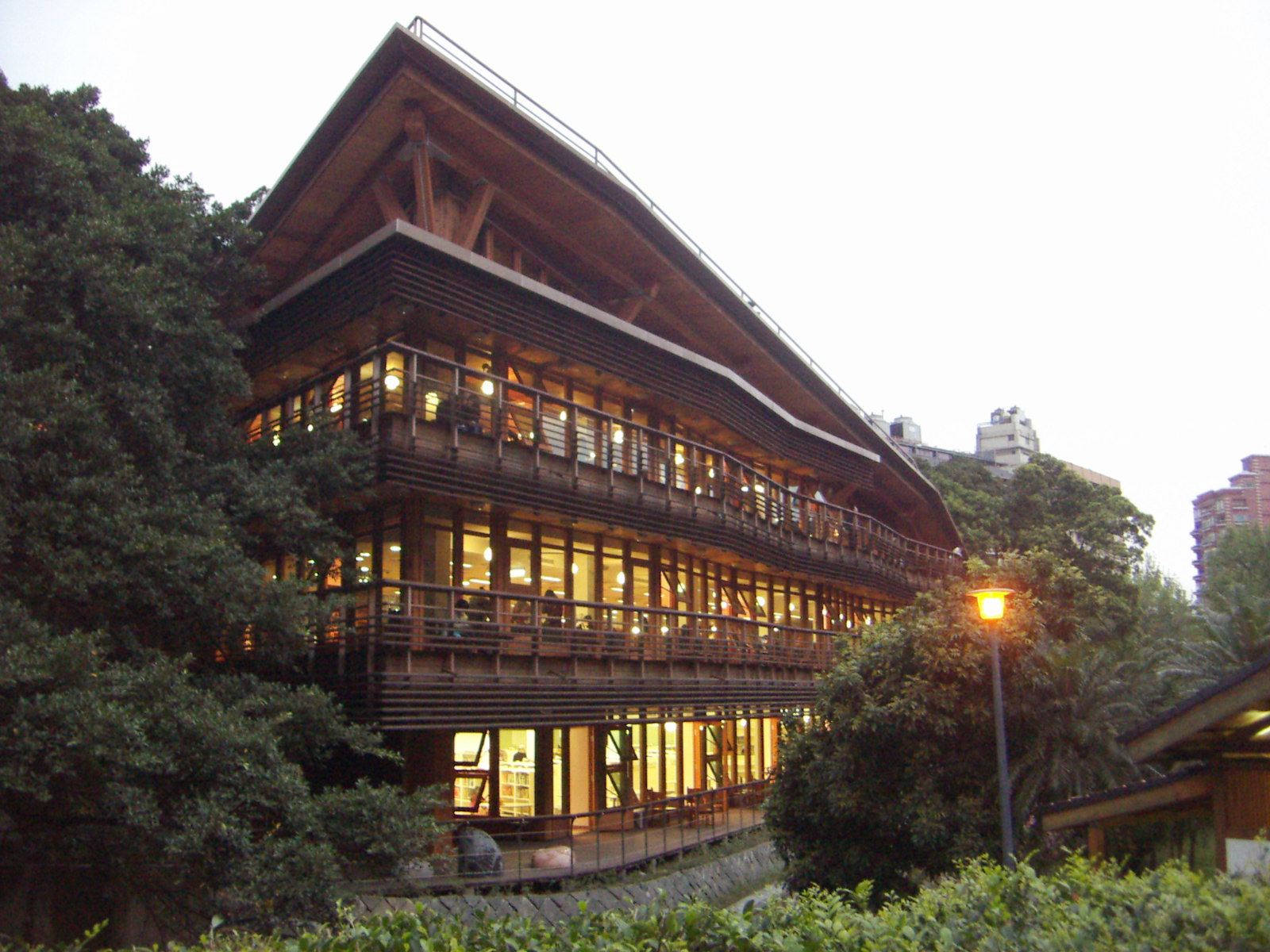
Taipei Public Library, Taipei City (2006)

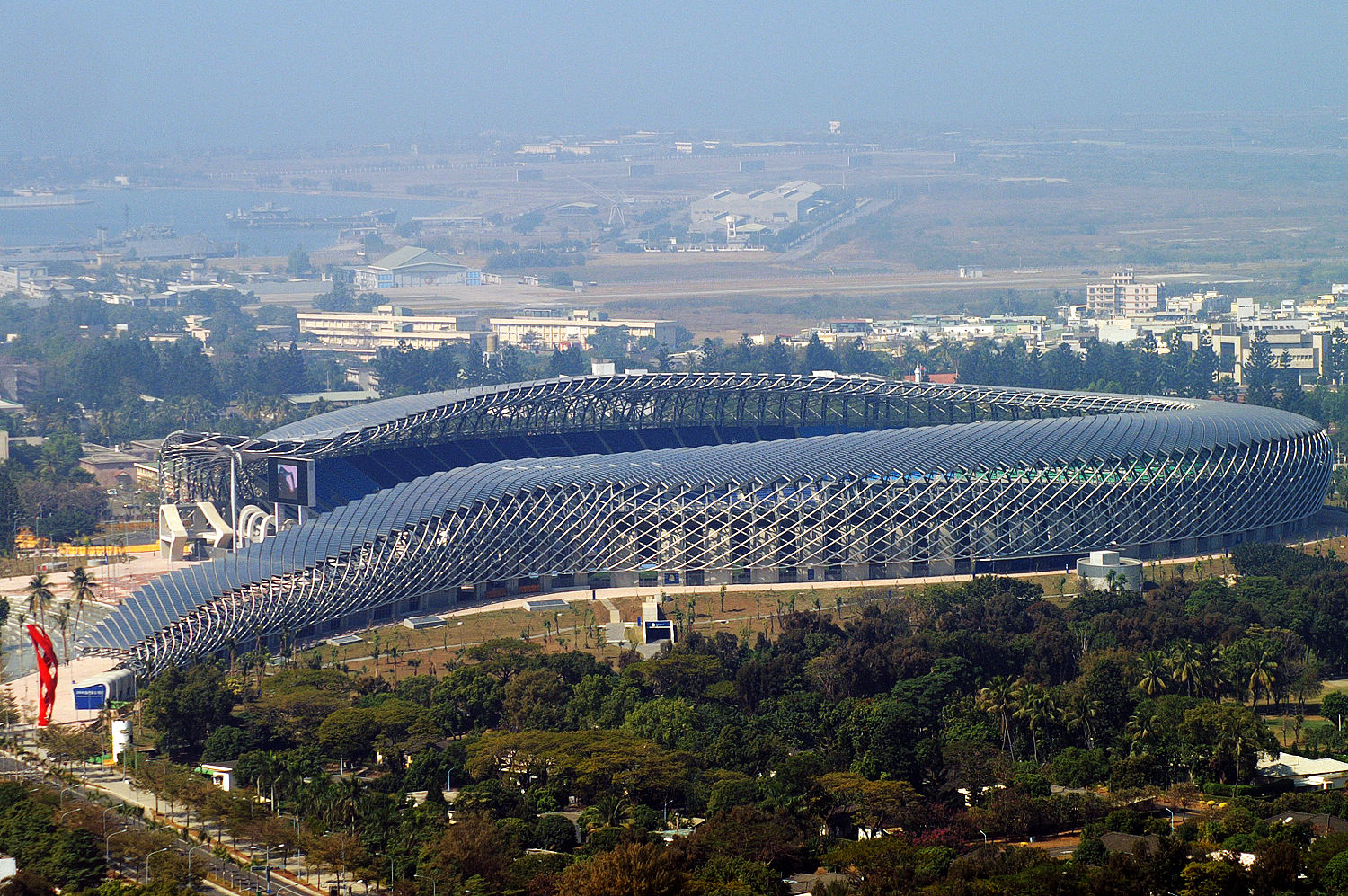
National Stadium, Kaohsiung City (2009)

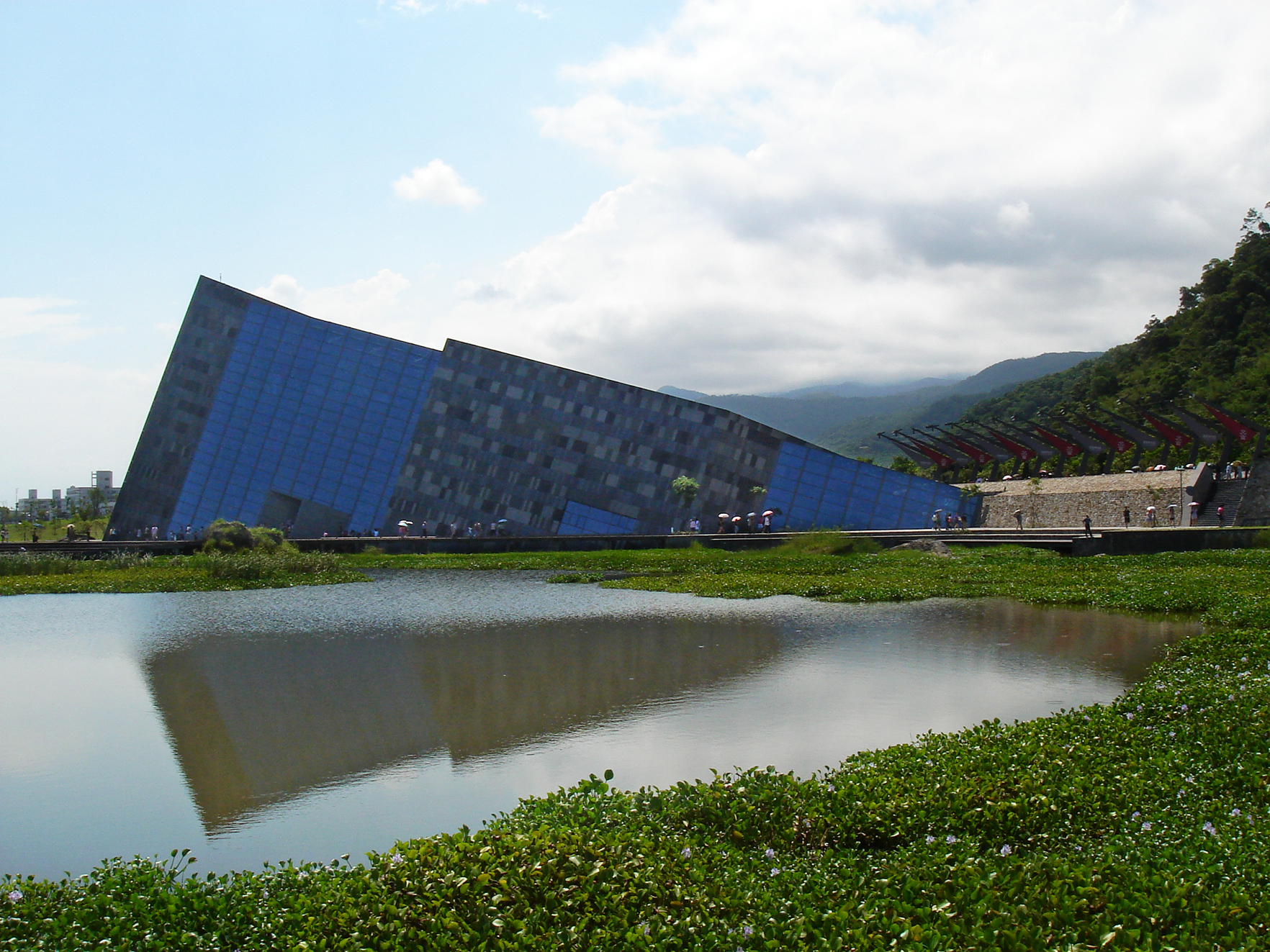
Lanyang Museum, Yilan County(2010)

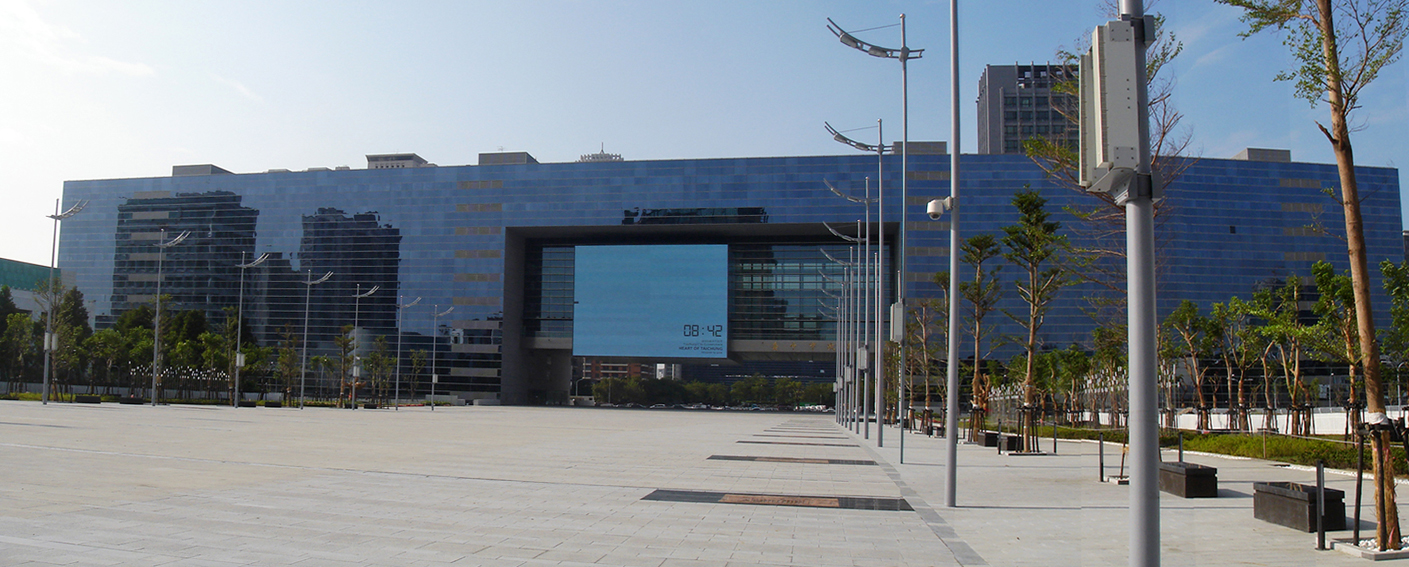
Taichung City Government Building, Taichung City (2010)

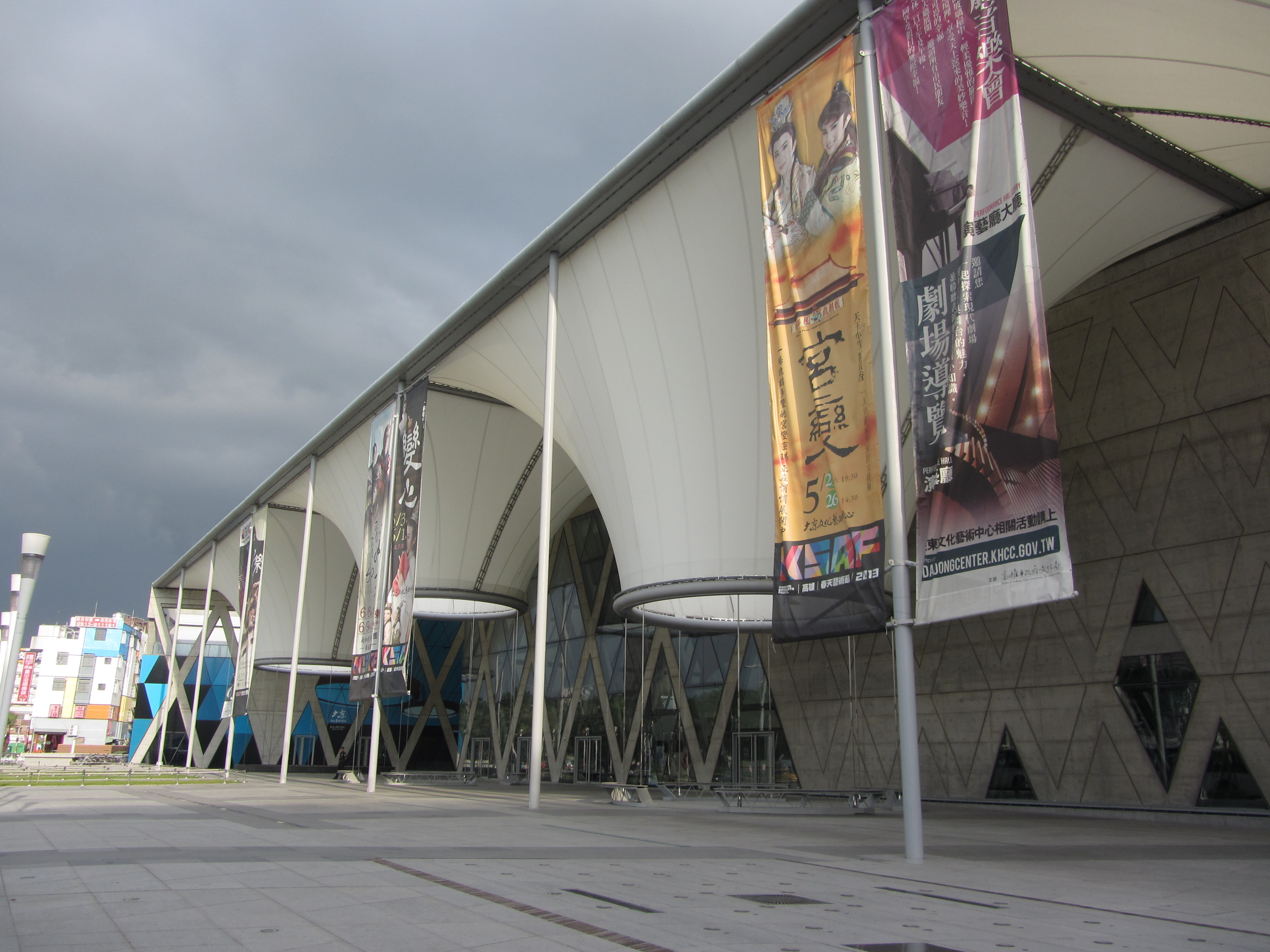
Dadong Arts Center, Kaohsiung City (2012)

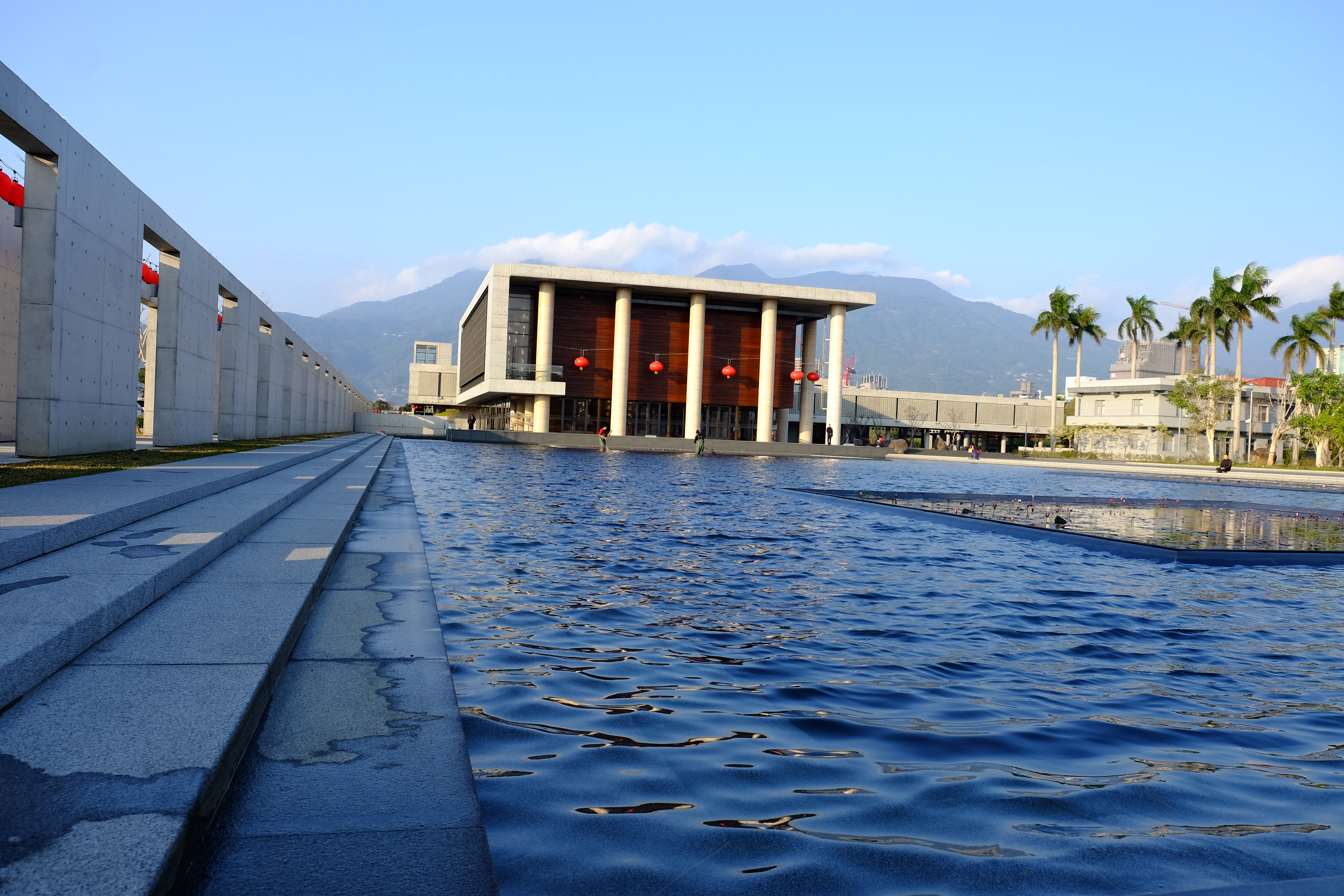
Water Moon Monastery (水月道場) of Nung Chan Monastery (農禪寺), Taipei City (2012), designed by Kris Yao.

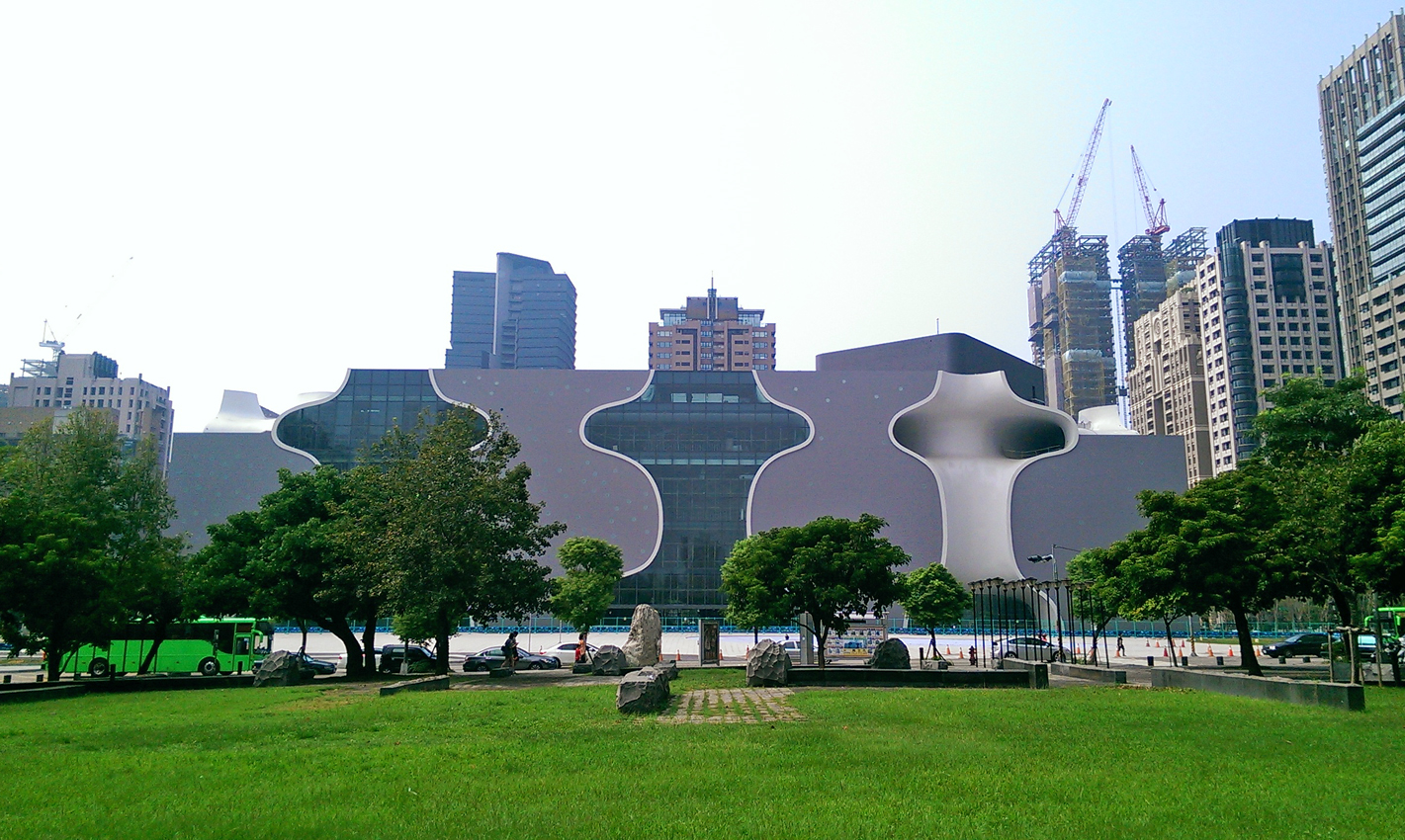
National Taichung Theater, Taichung City (2014)

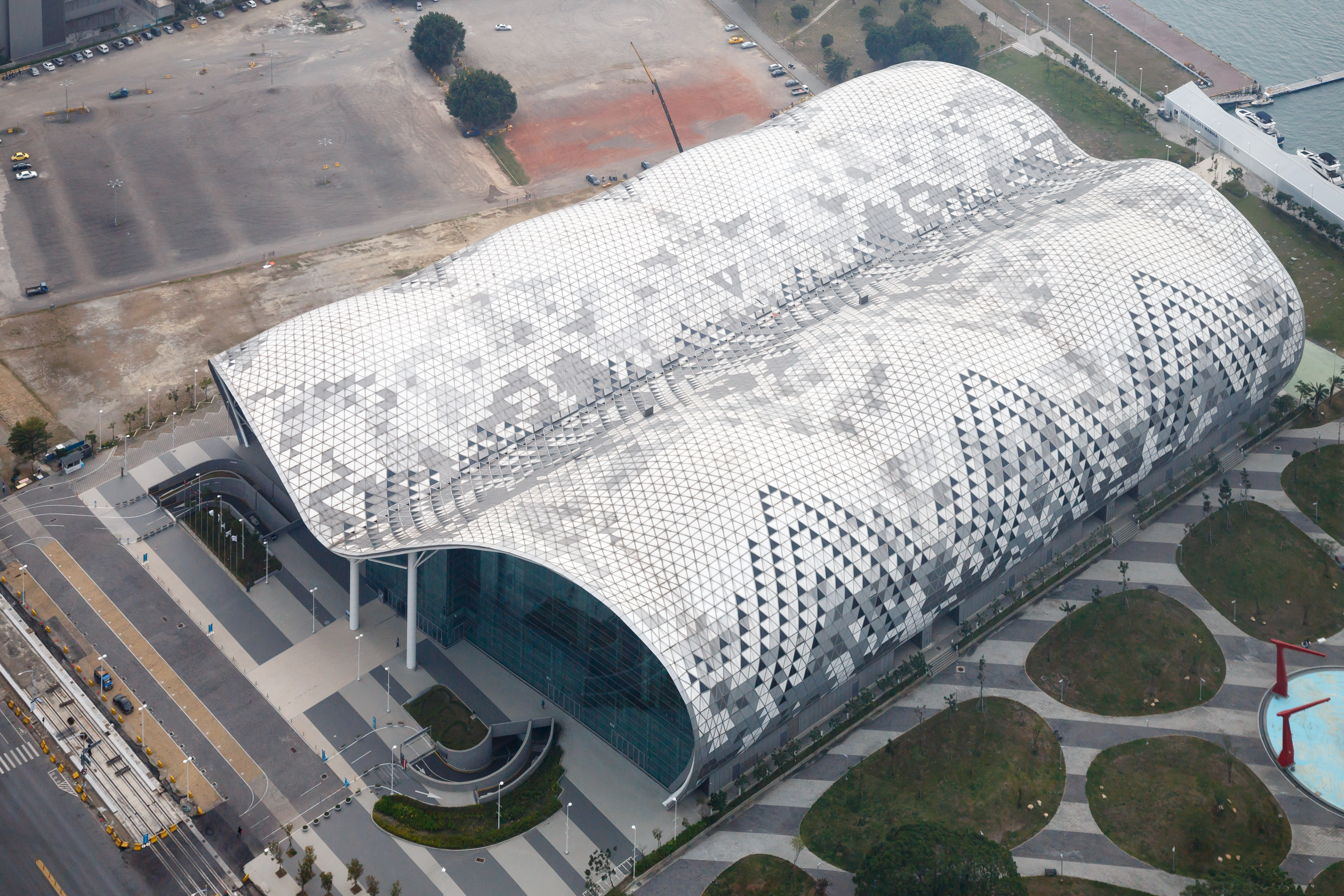
Kaohsiung Exhibition Center, Kaohsiung City (2014)

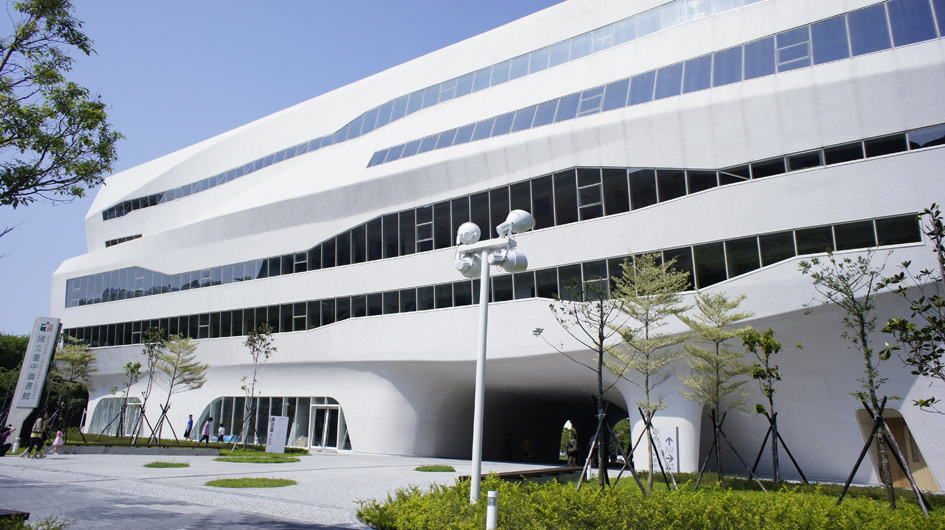
National Library of Public Information, Taichung City (2012)

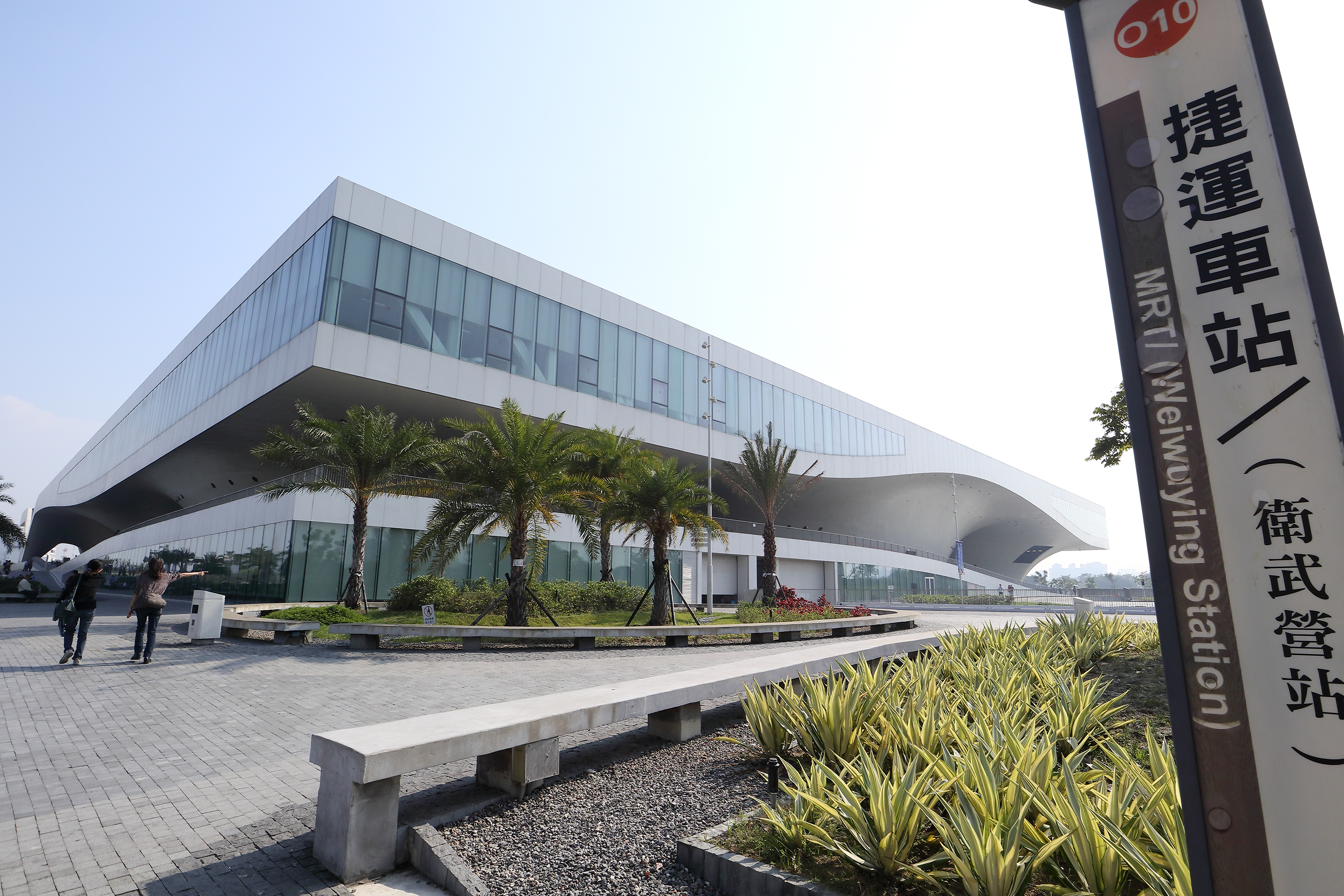
National Kaohsiung Center for the Arts, Kaohsiung City (2017)

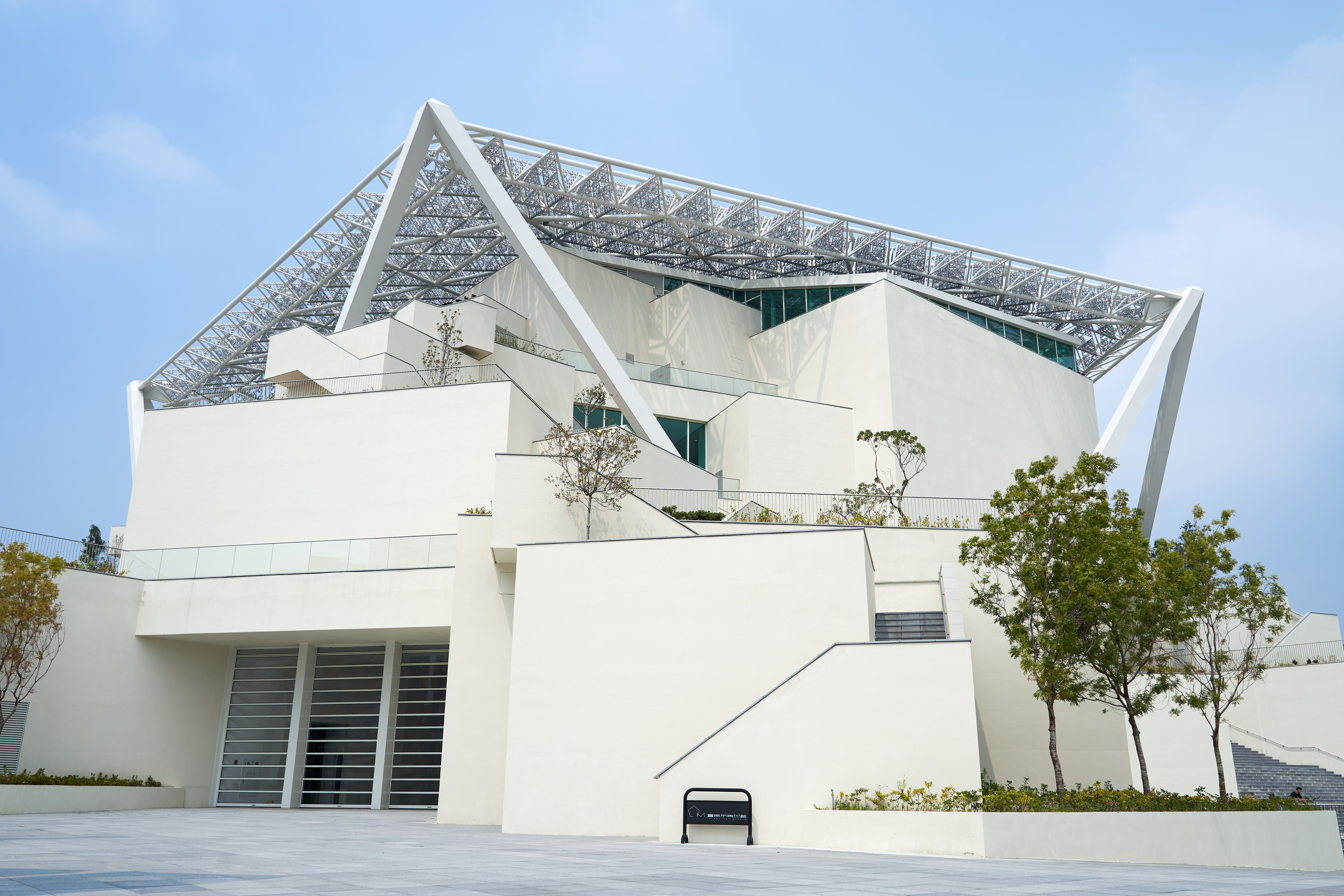
Tainan Art Museum, Tainan City (2018)

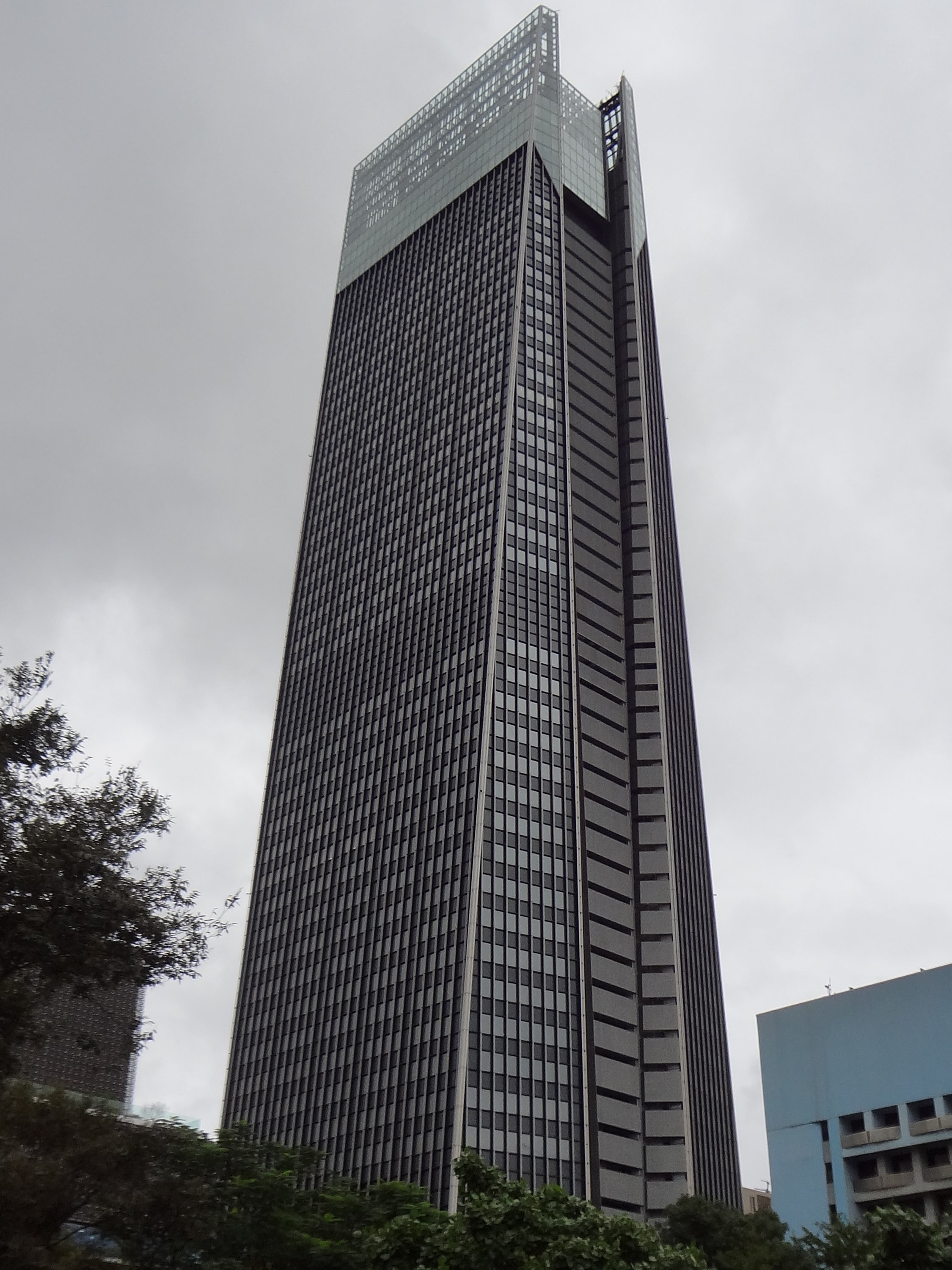
Taipei Nan Shan Plaza, Taipei City(2018)

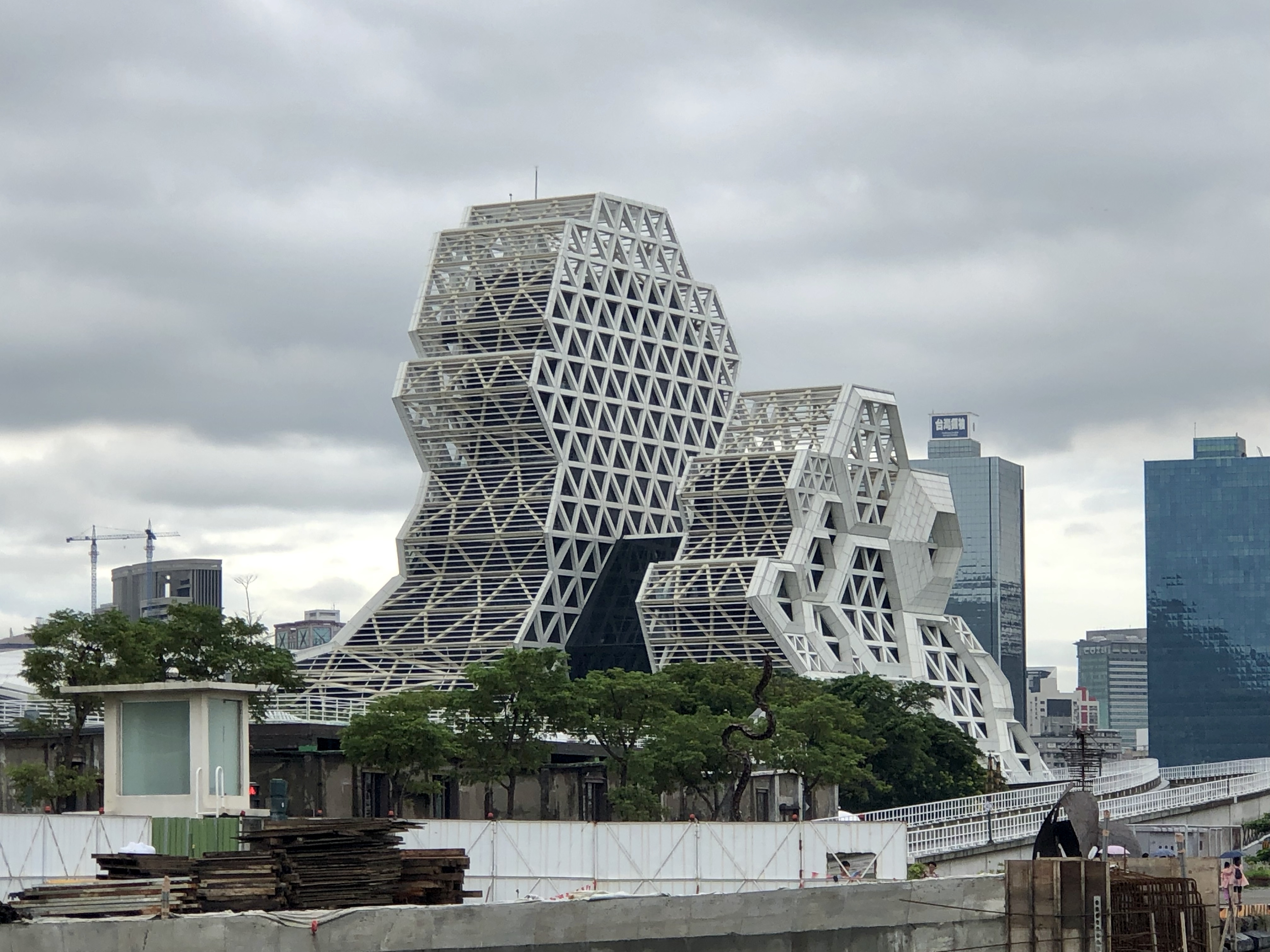
Kaohsiung Music Center, Kaohsiung City

== See also ==
- List of Taiwanese architects
- List of tallest buildings in Taiwan
- List of temples in Taiwan
- List of cities with most skyscrapers
