= Tainan =

Special municipality and oldest city in Taiwan

Tainan City 臺南市 (Note: In local languages: Traditional Chinese script: 臺南市; Mandarin Pinyin: Táinán Shì; Hokkien: Tâi-lâm Tshī; Sixian Hakka: Tǒi-nǎm Sii; Hailu Hakka: Toi-nam Shi^{+}) Tâi-lâm
- Special municipality
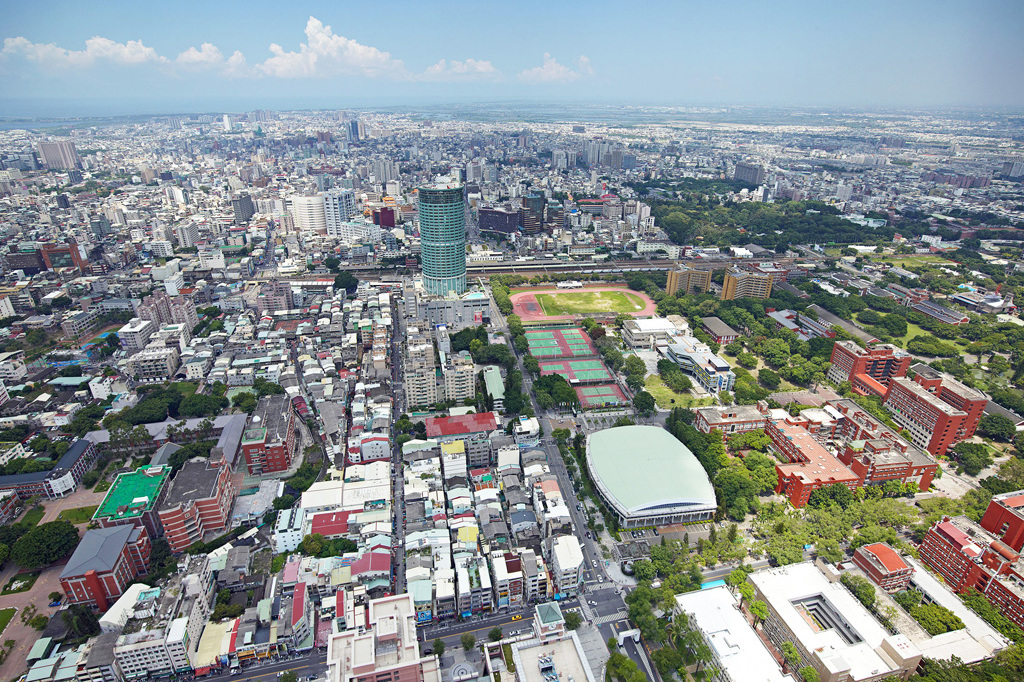
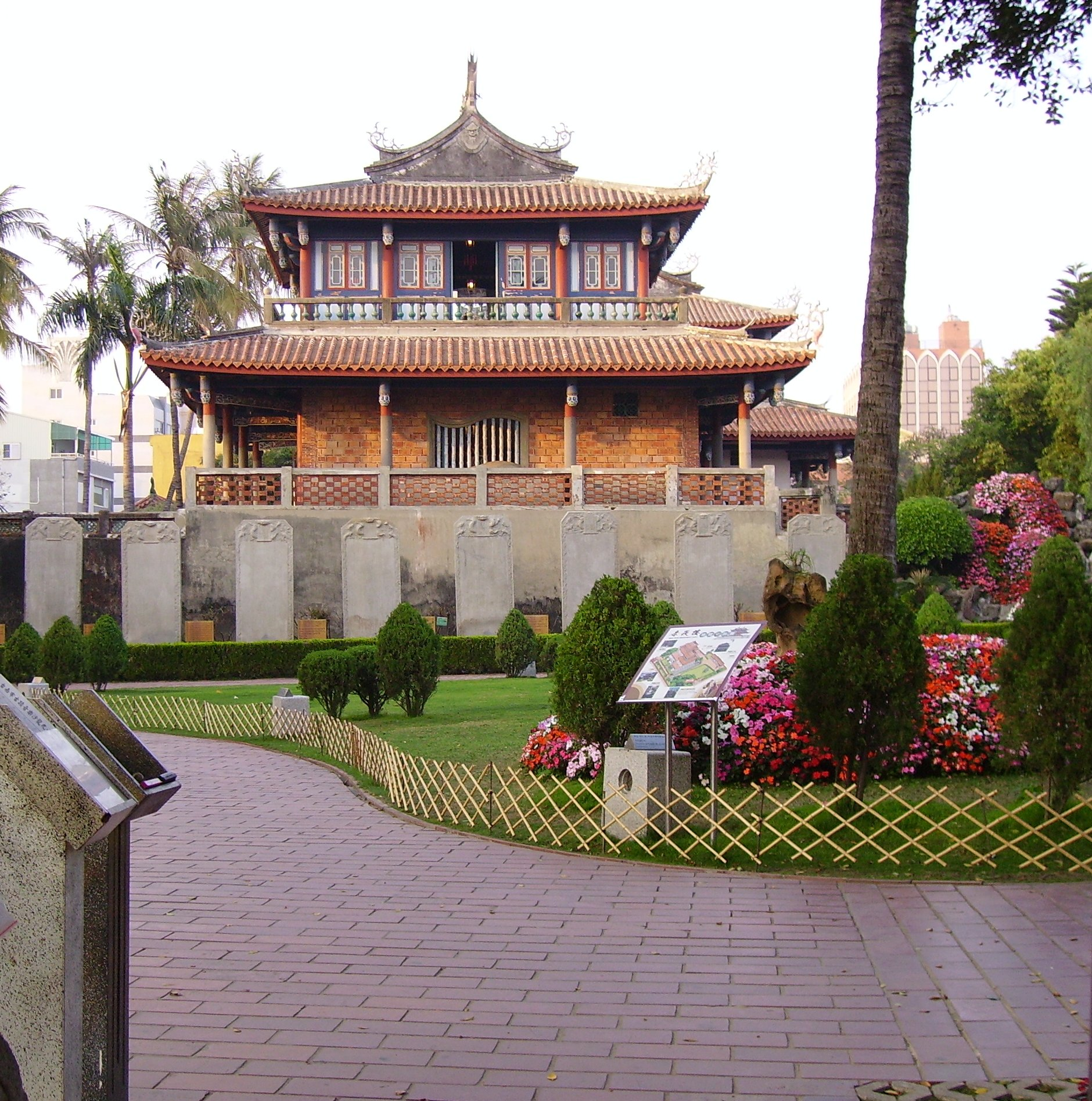
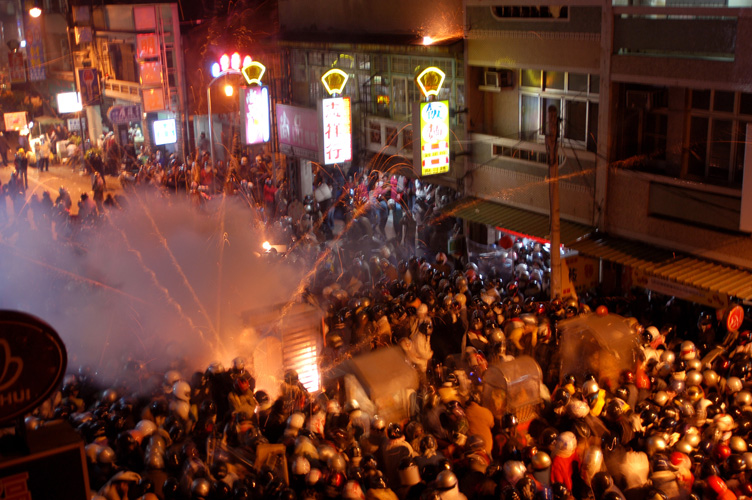
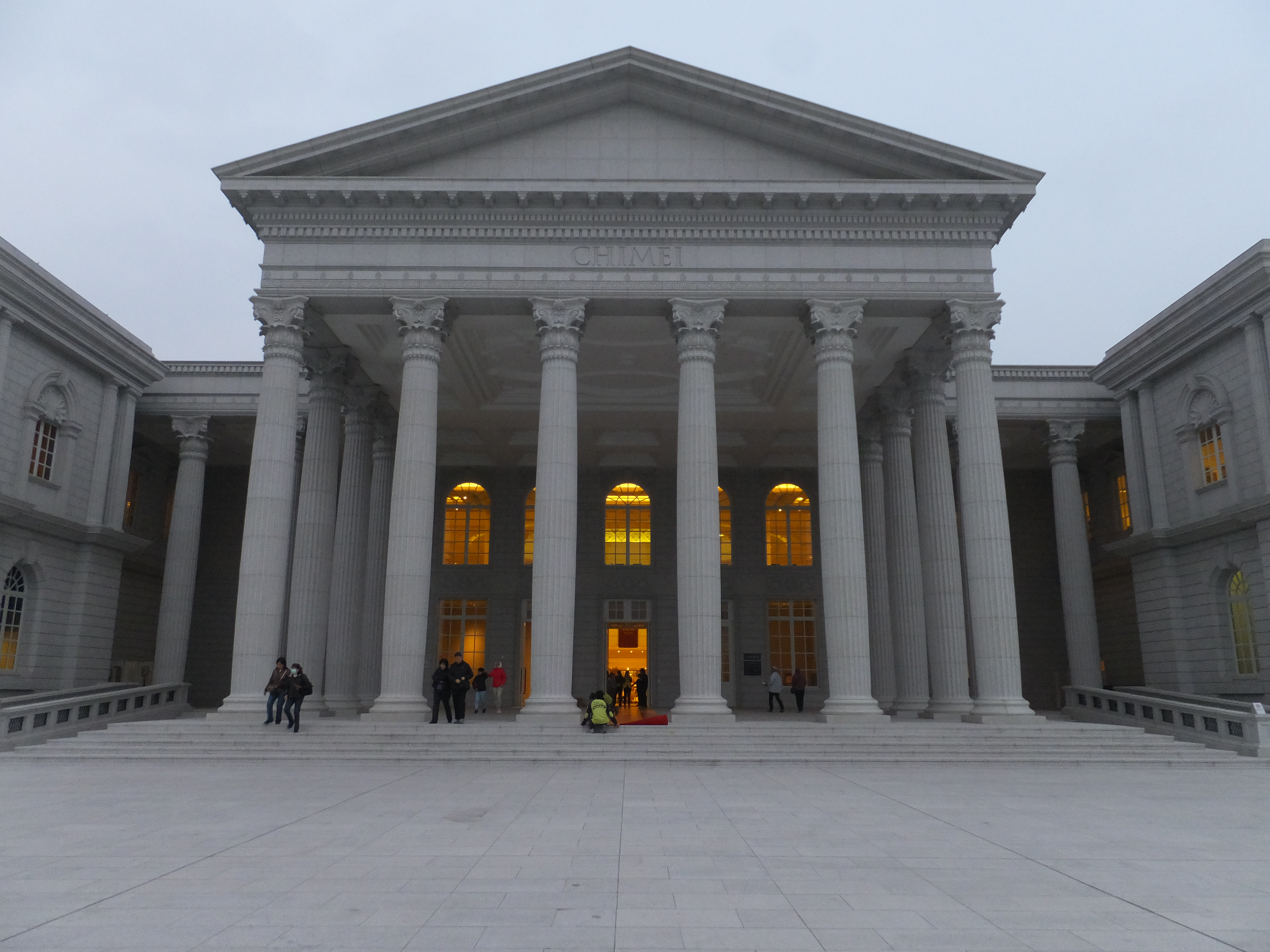
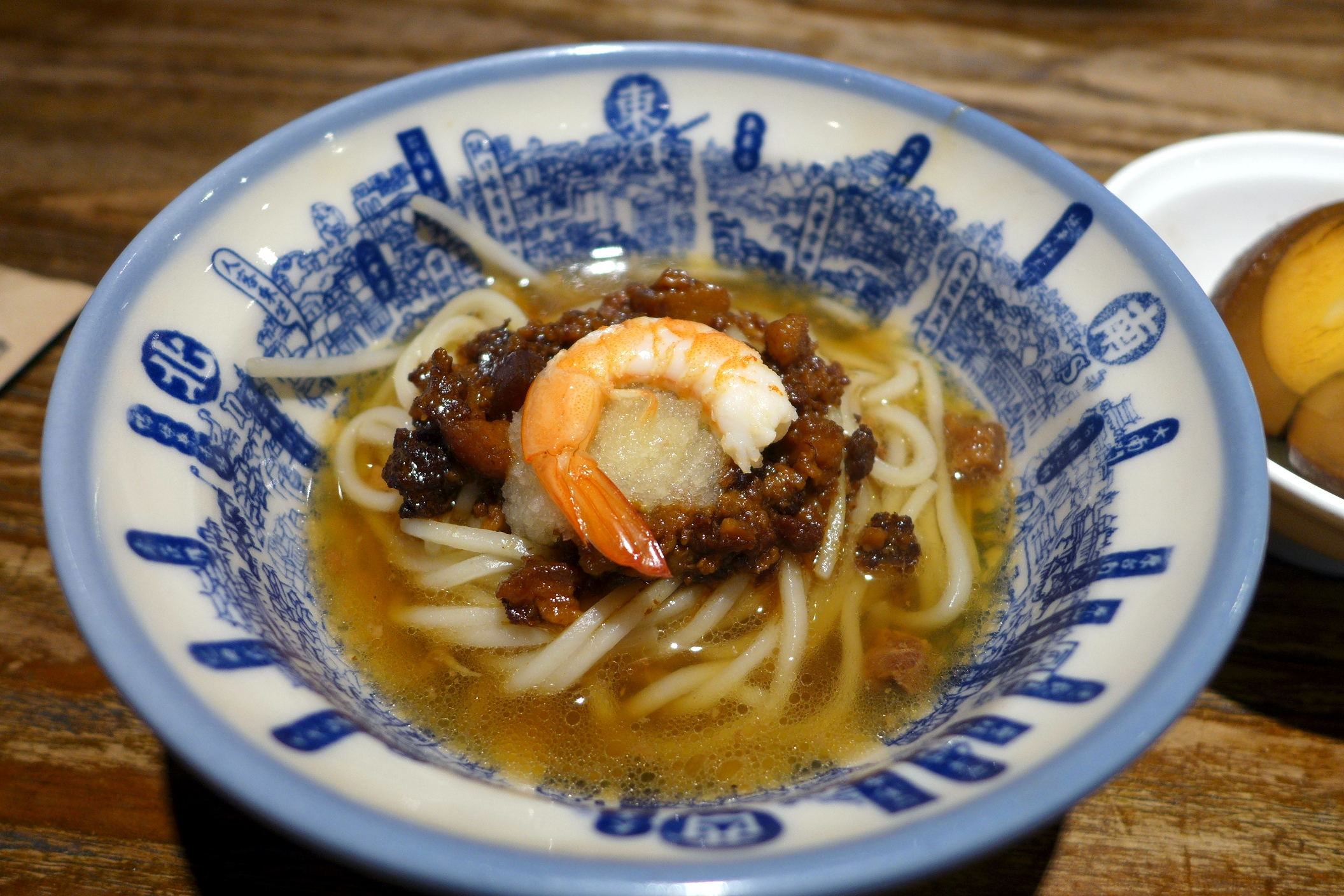
- Skyline of Tainan Fort Provintia Fireworks in Yanshuei Chimei Museum Danzai noodles Clockwise from top: Downtown Tainan, statue of Yoichi Hatta, THSR Tainan Station, danzai noodles, Fort Provintia, beehive firework in Yanshuei

- Flag Logo
- Etymology: pinyin: Táinán; lit. 'South of Taiwan'
- Nicknames: The Phoenix City (鳳凰城), The Prefecture City (府城), Nanying (南瀛)
- Coordinates: 22°59′24″N 120°11′6″E
- Country: Republic of China (Taiwan)
- Formed under Fort Zeelandia: 1624
- Capital of Kingdom of Tungning: 1661
- Tainan Prefecture: 1895
- Provincial city status: October 25, 1945
- Upgraded to special municipality and merger with Tainan County: December 25, 2010
- Seat: Anping, Xinying
- Districts: 37: Xinying; Yanshuei; Baihe; Liouying; Houbi; Dongshan; Madou; Xiaying; Lioujia; Guantian; Danei; Jiali; Syuejia; Sigang; Cigu; Jiangjun; Beimen; Sinhua; Shanhua; Sinshih; Anding; Shanshan; Yujing; Nansi; Nanhua; Zuojhen; Rende; Gueiren; Guanmiao; Longci; Yongkang; East; South; North; Annan; Anping; West Central

Government
  - Body: Tainan City Government; Tainan City Council
  - Mayor: Huang Wei-che (DPP)

Area
  - Special municipality: 2,191.65 km^{2} (846.20 sq mi)
  - Urban: 259 km^{2} (100 sq mi)
  - Rank: 7 out of 22

Population (March 2023)
  - Special municipality: 1,856,642
  - Rank: 6 of 22
  - Density: 847.143/km^{2} (2,194.09/sq mi)
  - Urban: 1,205,000
  - Urban density: 4,650/km^{2} (12,000/sq mi)
- Time zone: UTC+8 (National Standard Time)
- Postal code: 700–745
- Area code: (0)6
- ISO 3166 code: TW-TNN
- Bird: Pheasant-tailed jacana
- Flower: Phalaenopsis
- Tree: Delonix regia
- Website: www.tainan.gov.tw/en/ (in English)

Tainan City

Chinese name
- Traditional Chinese: 臺南市
- Simplified Chinese: 台南市
Transcriptions
Standard Mandarin
- Hanyu Pinyin: Táinán Shì
- Bopomofo: ㄊㄞˊ ㄋㄢˊ ㄕˋ
- Gwoyeu Romatzyh: Tairnan Shyh
- Wade–Giles: T'ai^{2}-nan^{2} Shih^{4}
- Tongyong Pinyin: Táinán Shìh
- MPS2: Táinán Shr̀
- IPA: [tʰǎɪ.nǎn ʂɻ̩̂]
Hakka
- Pha̍k-fa-sṳ: Thòi-nàm-sṳ
Southern Min
- Hokkien POJ: Tâi-lâm-chhī
- Tâi-lô: Tâi-lâm-tshī

Japanese name
- Hiragana: たいなんし
- Katakana: タイナンシ
- Kyūjitai: 臺南市
- Shinjitai: 台南市
Transcriptions
- Revised Hepburn: Tainan-shi
- Kunrei-shiki: Tainan-si

Tainan (/ˈtaɪˈnɑːn/), officially Tainan City, is a special municipality in southern Taiwan, facing the Taiwan Strait on its western coast. Tainan is the oldest city on the island and commonly called the "prefectural capital" (Note: In local languages: Traditional Chinese script: 府城; Mandarin Pinyin: Fǔchéng; Hokkien: Hú-siâⁿ) for its 263-year history as the capital of Taiwan under Dutch rule, the Kingdom of Tungning and later Qing dynasty rule until 1887. Tainan's complex history of comebacks, redefinitions and renewals inspired its popular nickname "the Phoenix City". Tainan was classified as a "Sufficiency"-level global city by the Globalization and World Cities Research Network in 2020, but was not classified in 2022 and 2024.

As Taiwan's oldest urban area with over 400 years of history, Tainan was initially established by the Dutch East India Company (VOC) as a ruling and trading base called Fort Zeelandia during the Dutch colonial rule on the island. After Koxinga seized the Dutch fort in 1662, Tainan remained as the capital of the Tungning Kingdom ruled by the House of Koxinga until 1683 and afterwards the capital of Taiwan Prefecture under the Qing dynasty until 1887, when the new provincial capital was first moved to present-day Taichung, and then eventually to Taipei. Following the cession of Taiwan, Tainan became the second capital of the short-lived Republic of Formosa from June to October 1895 until the Capitulation of Tainan by the invading forces of the Japanese Empire. Under Japanese rule, the city was the seat of Tainan Prefecture. After the surrender of Japan in World War II, the Republic of China took control of Taiwan in 1945 and reorganized the city as a provincial city in Taiwan Province, a role that would remain in place until 2010 when the city was merged with nearby Tainan County into a new special municipality.

The legacy of Tainan's long history of establishment has left significant impact on Taiwan, and its former name, Tayouan, has been claimed to be the origin of the name "Taiwan". It is also one of Taiwan's cultural capitals, for its rich folk cultures including the famous local street food and traditional cuisine, extensively preserved Taoist rites and other living local traditions covering everything from childbirth to funerals. The city houses the first Confucian school–temple in Taiwan, built in 1665, the remains of the Eastern and Southern gates of the old city, and countless other historical monuments. In recent decades, the city has become a major global hub for the semiconductor industry, driven by the development of the Southern Taiwan Science Park, where advanced manufacturing facilities (notably TSMC's) produce nearly all of the world's high-end AI chips.

== History ==
=== Early history ===
Archaeological excavations in Zuojhen District suggest that the Tainan region has been inhabited for at least 20,000 to 31,000 years. The indigenous Siraya tribe dominated the region by the 16th century. The Sakam people of the Sinkan sub-tribe inhabited the area of the present-day city. Other Sirayan sub-tribes, including the Soelangh, Mattauw and Baccloangh inhabited the surrounding area.

By the late 16th century, Chinese merchants and fishermen had set up several bases along the west coast of the island, including a sandbar across the Taikang Inner Sea (Chinese: 臺江內海; Pe̍h-ōe-jī: Tâi-kang lāi-hái) off the bay of Sakam village (modern-day Fort Provintia). The Chinese adopted Taioan (modern-day Anping) as the name of the sandbar. Slightly north of Taioan, along the shoreline near Bassemboy (北線尾; Pak-siàn-bóe), Japanese traders established bases for trade with China. The early Chinese and Japanese also traded with the Sirayan people. Salt and food was exchanged for deer hides and dried deer meat. The Siraya people were influenced by both Chinese and Japanese cultures and lifestyles. They started to use Chinese words in their language, use Japanese tantō in ritual events, and also migrated inland due to the influx of newcomers. By the time the Europeans arrived, the influence of Chinese and Japanese traders and fishermen was already prominent.

=== Dutch colony ===
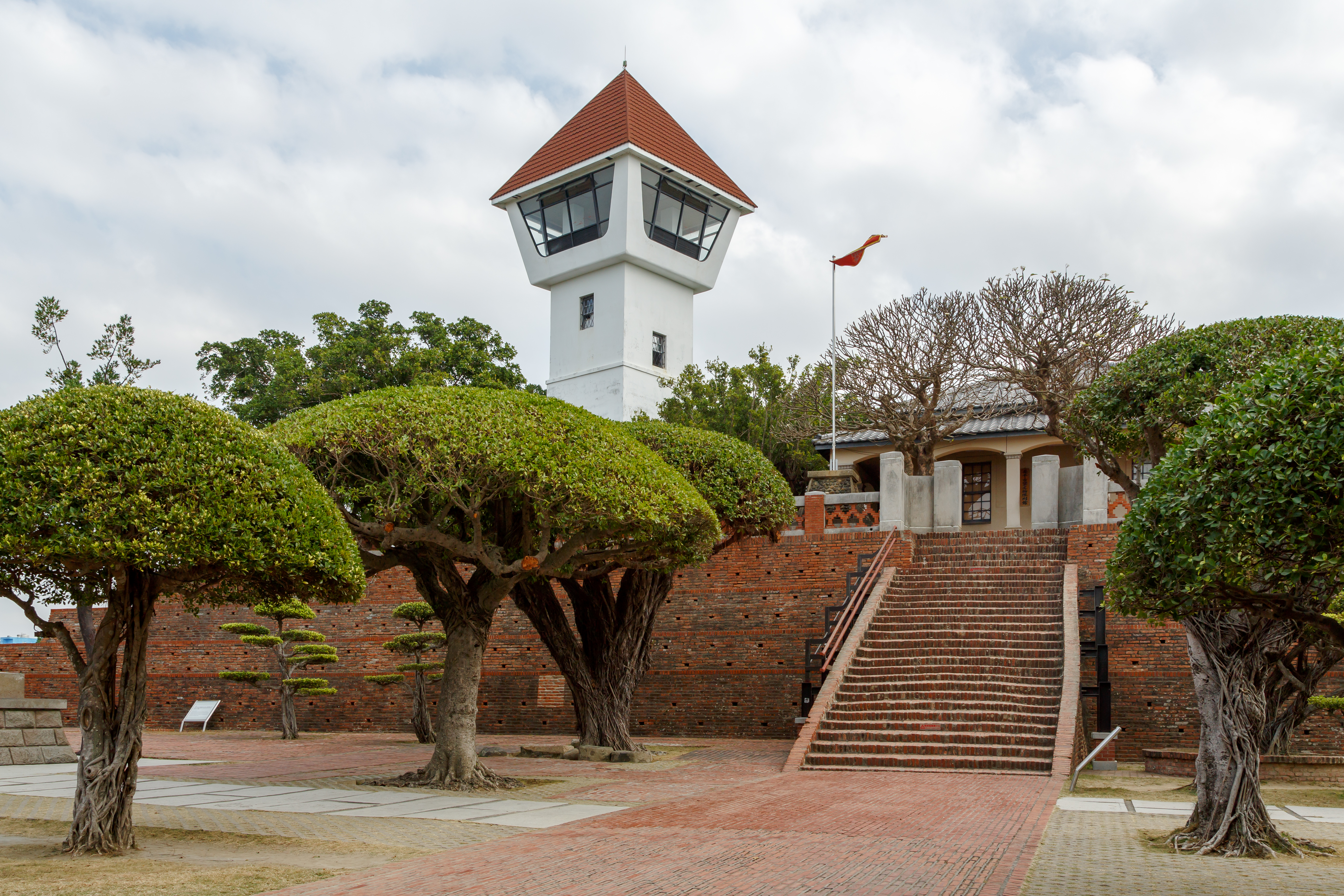
Anping Fort (site of the Fort Zeelandia)

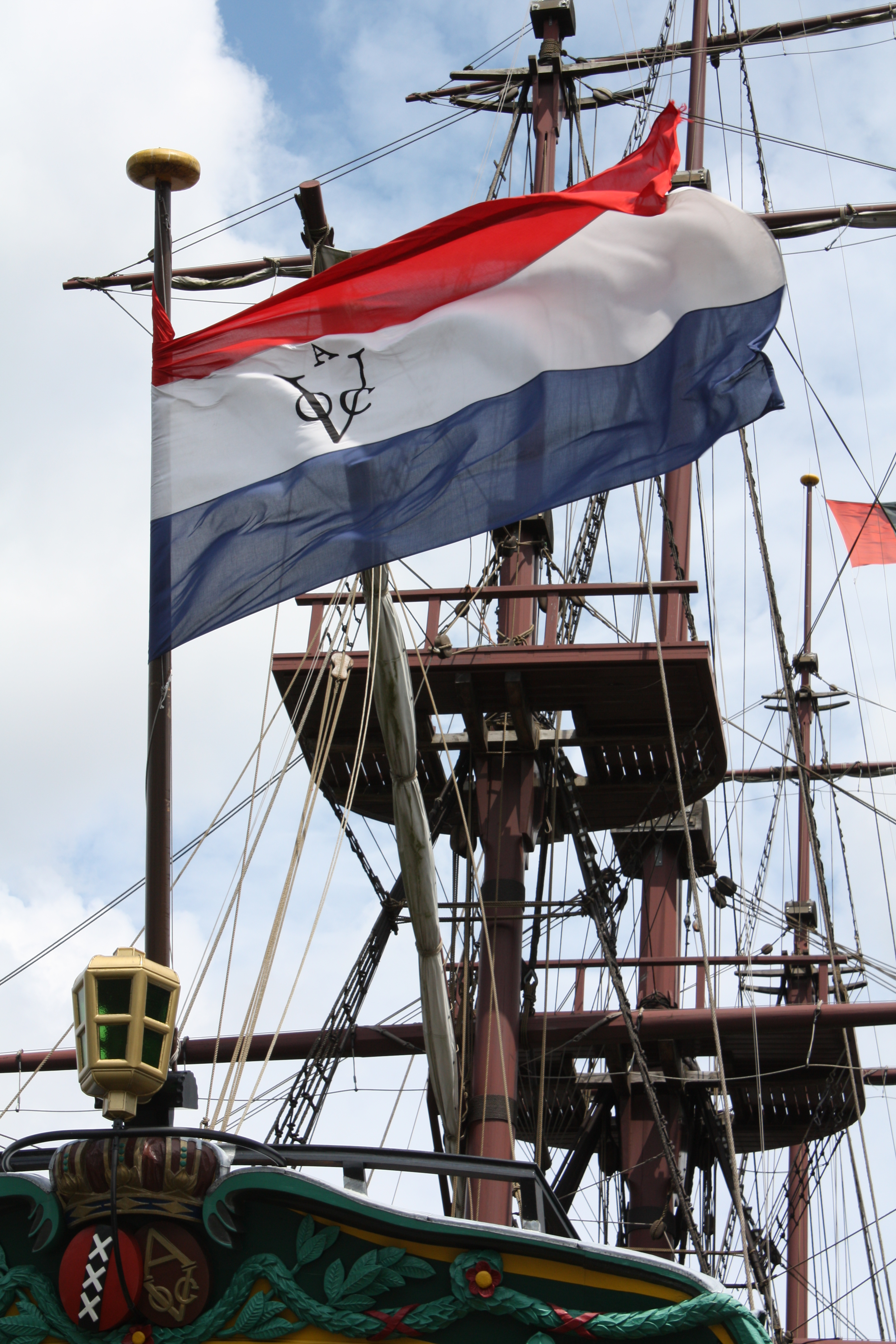
Replica of an East Indiaman of the Dutch East India Company/United East Indies Company (VOC).

Early Dutch colonists had attempted but failed to control Macau and the Penghu islands. In July 1622, the Dutch East India Company textile merchant Cornelis Reyersz sailed to Taiwan in search of a suitable location to build a trading post. In 1624 he established a small fort named 'Orange' on the sandy peninsula they called Tayouan (modern-day Anping). The fort was then expanded and renamed Fort Zeelandia. The settlement was initially designed as a base to attack their Spanish rivals and as a trading post between China and Batavia in Indonesia. Later the post became the center of Dutch trade between China, Japan and Europe. During the governorship of Pieter Nuyts (1627–29), there was hostility between the Dutch and Japanese merchants, leading at one point to Nuyts being held hostage by a Japanese trader, Hamada Yahee.

The Dutch pacification campaign on Formosa was a series of military actions and diplomatic moves undertaken in 1635 and 1636. They aimed at subduing hostile aboriginal villages in the south-western region of the island. In 1642 the Dutch seized the Spanish garrison at Santisima Trinidad in Keelung. The Dutch East India Company became the first authority to claim control of the whole of Formosa, with Fort Zeelandia as the seat of government.

Tensions arose between the Dutch and the Chinese inhabitants of Taiwan due to heavy Dutch taxation and Dutch participation in plunder during the collapse of the Ming dynasty. Eventually, this led to the brief, but bloody, Guo Huaiyi Rebellion in 1652. The Dutch crushed the revolt only with the help of the local Sinkanese.

The settlements near to Fort Zeelandia expanded as a result of the Dutch trading post in the area. In 1653, the Dutch built a new fort, Fort Provintia, in the Sakam area as a center for an agricultural colony. The Dutch encouraged Chinese farmers to migrate to Taiwan to grow rice and sugar cane. The Dutch settlement in southern Taiwan was so successful that, by the 1650s, it had overtaken Batavia.

=== Kingdom of Tungning ===
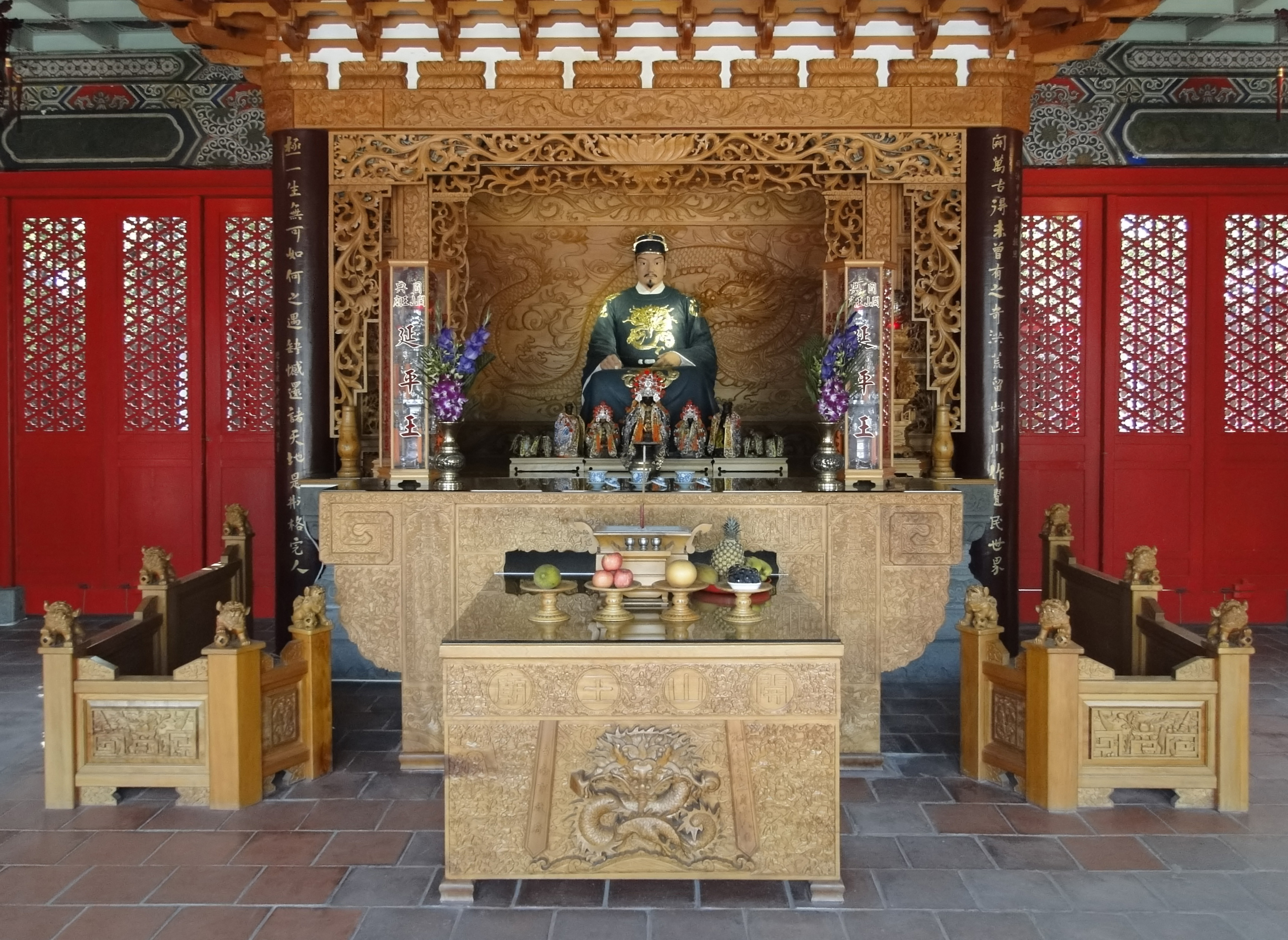
Statue of Koxinga in Koxinga's Shrine

Koxinga (also known as Zheng Chenggong) was a Ming loyalist and chief commander of the Ming troops on the maritime front for the later emperors of the withering dynasty. In 1661, Koxinga attacked the Dutch colonists in Taiwan. After a nine-month siege, the Dutch Governor of Taiwan, Frederik Coyett, surrendered Fort Zeelandia to Koxinga on February 1, 1662. This effectively ended 38 years of Dutch rule on Taiwan. Koxinga then devoted himself to transforming Taiwan into a military base for loyalists who wanted to restore the Ming dynasty.

Koxinga set about making Taiwan a base for the Ming loyalist movement. Fort Provintia was renamed Tungtu, and Fort Zeelandia became Anping. Koxinga set up military colonies on the surrounding plains to help feed his forces. Many suburbs surrounding Tainan City today include in their names "Ying", "Jia", and "Tian", all derived from this event. After the death of Koxinga in 1662, his son, Zheng Jing, changed the name of Dongdu to Dong Ning. His chief minister, Chen Yonghua, introduced Chinese bureaucracy, built the first Confucian temple on the island, and introduced the method of salt production to coastal areas. The British were invited to set up a trading post in Anping to continue trade between Taiwan, Japan, and South East Asia. This helped to maintain the region as a center of trade.

=== Qing dynasty ===
Jieguanting (接官亭) in Go-tiau-kang, Tainan gateway to the sea during the Qing dynasty

The death of Zheng Jing in 1681 was followed by a struggle for succession. Seizing the advantage presented by the infighting, on July 17, 1683, Qing naval commander Shi Lang defeated the Tungning fleet in the Battle of Penghu. Two days later, Qing troops landed at Tungning and encountered little resistance. In 1684 the kingdom was incorporated into the Qing Empire as part of Fujian province, ending two decades of rule by the Zheng family. Taiwan Prefecture was established, with its prefectural seat Taiwanfu at modern-day Tainan. Taiwan County is also established as the first county of the Prefecture, located around the prefecture seat.

In 1721, Chinese peasants and indigenous tribes rose in rebellion against Qing misrule. The rebels, led by Zhu Yigui, captured Tainan without a fight. Turmoil ensued as the rebels soon fought amongst themselves. It was only after a Qing army was dispatched from mainland China that order was restored. Zhu was captured and executed. As Qing law prohibited the building of city walls in Taiwan, Qing authorities decided to create a defensive boundary around the city by growing bamboo around the perimeter. After several further uprisings across the island, work on a city wall began in the late 1780s.

A flood in 1823 brought rich silt from nearby rivers, which formed a widespread new fertile plain across the Taijiang bay area between Tainan and Anping. A canal system called Go-tiau-kang (五條港; Pe̍h-ōe-jī: Gō͘-tiâu-káng) was built to keep the port in Tainan functioning but prevented large ships from entering the bay.

From 1825 until 1866 a shipyard in Tainan produced warships for the Qing navy from native wood.

After 174 years of restrictions on trade with the Europeans, the Qing reopened Anping port as part of the Tianjin treaty following the Second Opium War in 1858. The Anping Customs house was established in 1864. Western merchants built trading posts near the remains of Fort Zeelandia.

Following the murder of 54 Japanese sailors by Paiwan aborigines near the southwestern tip of Taiwan in 1871, the punitive Japanese Expedition of 1874 to Taiwan revealed the fragility of the Qing dynasty's hold on Taiwan. As a result, the Qing sent the imperial commissioner Shen Baozhen to Taiwan to strengthen its defense. In Tainan, Shen made several efforts to modernize the defenses including inviting French engineers to design the Eternal Golden Castle in Erkunshen. He also recommended setting up a telegraph cable link between Tainan and Amoy. Some parts of the castle were built using bricks taken from Fort Zeelandia.

After over 200 years of development, Tainan had become the largest city in Taiwan and a Chinese city with foreign influence. The following is a description of the city by the Scottish missionary William Campbell upon his first arrival to the island in 1871:

As to Taiwan-fu itself, I may say that the brick wall which surrounds it is about fifteen feet in thickness, twenty-five in height, and some five miles in circumference. Lofty watch-towers are built over the four main gateways, and large spaces within the city are given to the principal temples and yamens—or quarters occupied by the civil and military mandarins. There is much need in Taiwan-fu for the carrying out of a City Improvement Scheme. Pleasant walks, no doubt, there are, and some of the shops have an appearance which is decidedly attractive; but, as a rule, the streets are narrow, winding, ill-paved, and odorous.

In 1885, the Qing government commenced work to develop the island into Taiwan Province. The capital of the island (and its designation as "Taiwanfu") was moved to Toatun (modern-day Taichung). The name of the old Taiwanfu was changed to Tainanfu, the seat of Tainan Prefecture.

=== Japanese rule ===
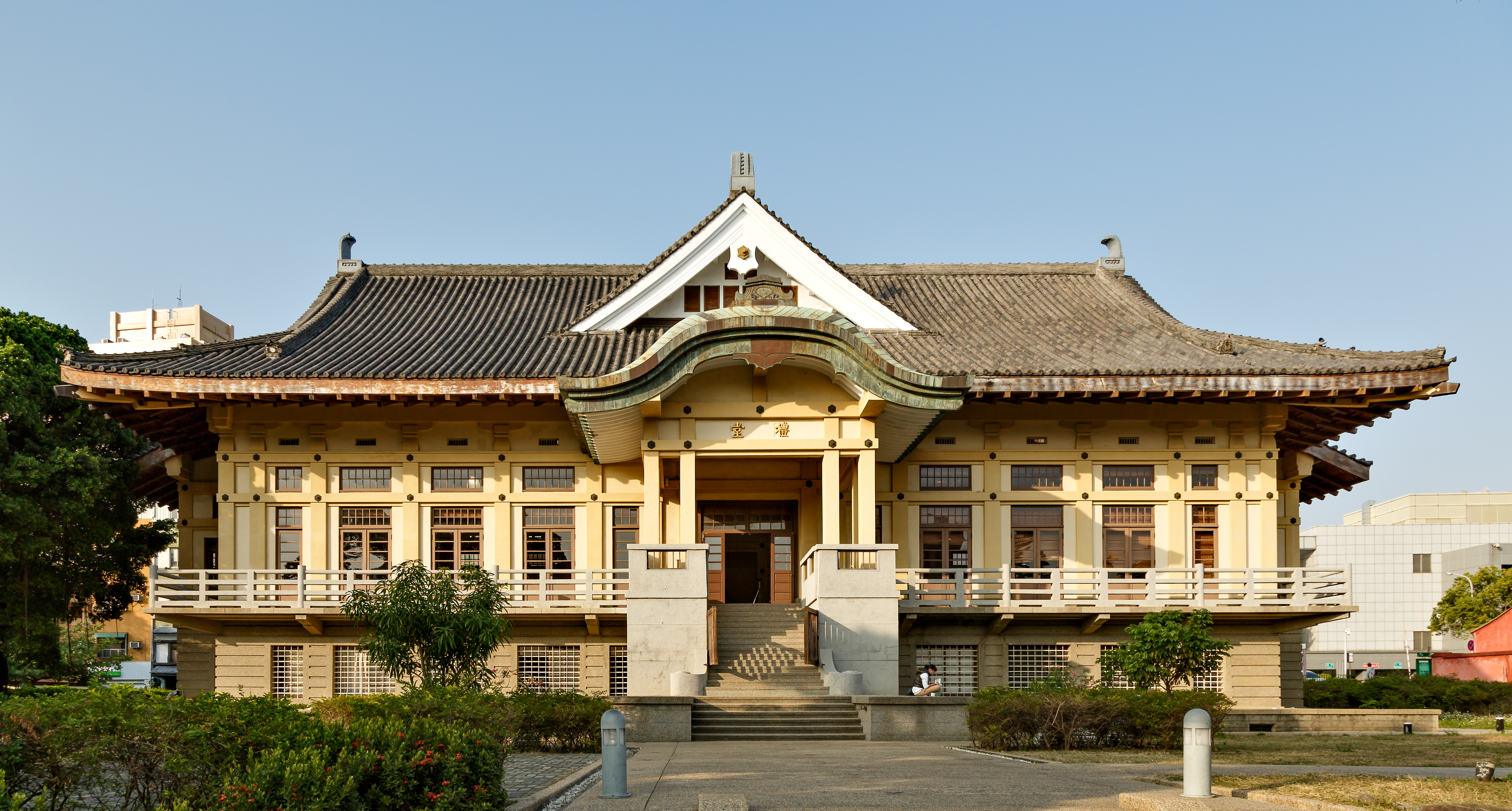
Tainan Butokuden (Martial Arts Hall)

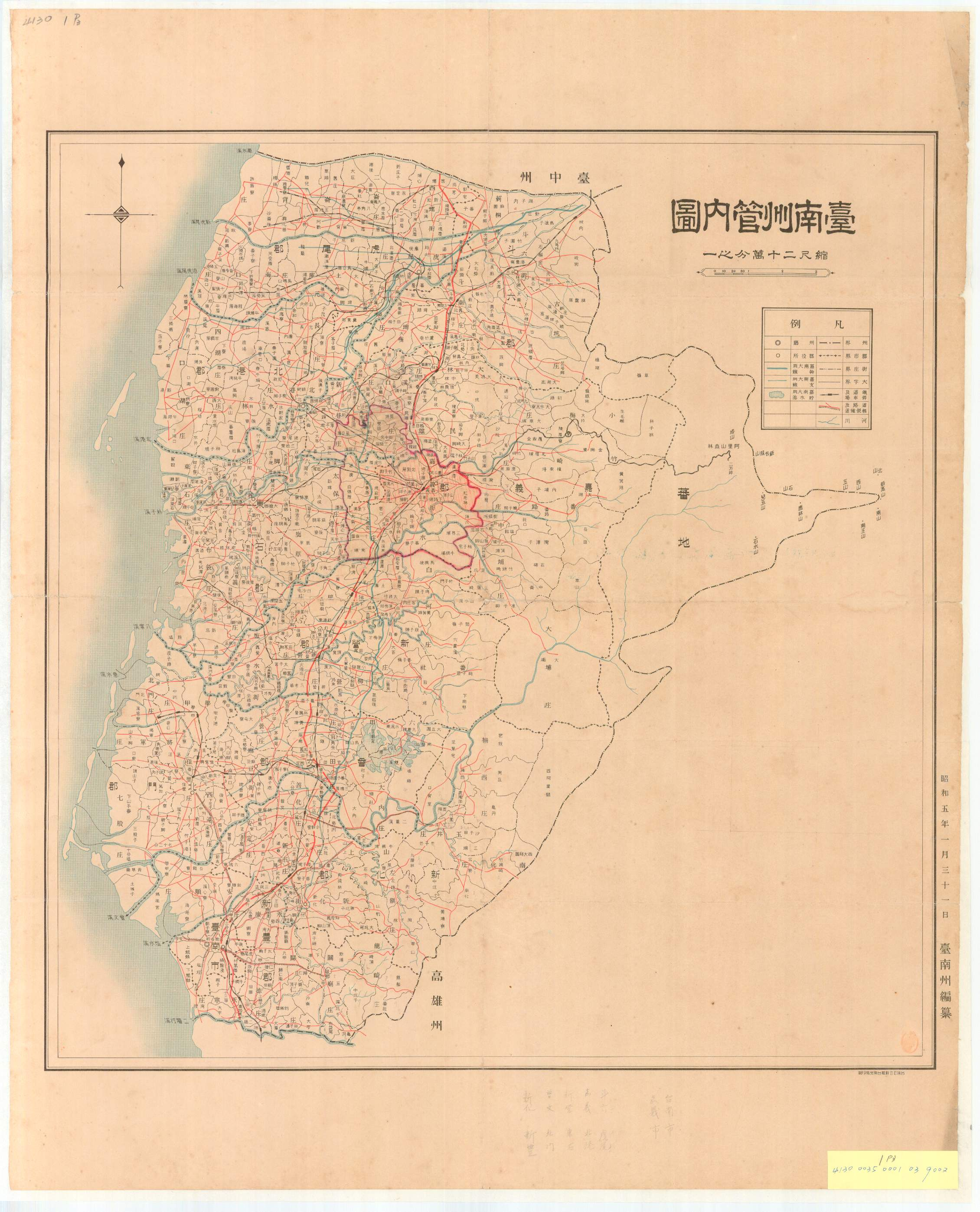
Tainan Prefecture

As a consequence of the Chinese losing the First Sino-Japanese War in 1895, Taiwan and the Penghu Islands were ceded to Japan by the Treaty of Shimonoseki. The Republic of Formosa was proclaimed in Tainan in May 1895, in an effort to forestall the incoming Japanese occupation. A Japanese army arrived at Tainan in October 1895. Liu Yongfu and the other Republican leaders fled, leaving the city in disarray. A Scottish missionary, Thomas Barclay, was chosen by local elites and foreign merchants to negotiate the Japanese entry into the city. As a result, Tainan was taken without resistance. Under Japanese rule, Tainan was initially administered under Tainan Ken (臺南縣). With a population of about 50,000 in 1904, Tainan was Taiwan's most populous city.

The anti-Japanese uprising known as the Tapani Incident began in Ta-pa-ni (modern-day Yujing) on April 9, 1915. The revolt, led by Yu Qingfang, spread quickly across the whole island and was supported by both Chinese and indigenous Taiwanese. The Japanese crushed the uprising. Many villages were destroyed and thousands of people were killed during the repression which followed. Yu Qingfang was captured on August 22, 1915. More than 800 people were sentenced to death in Tainan. Over 100 of them were executed while the rest were pardoned by the new Taishō Emperor. The place where the rebellion began, Xilai Temple in Tainan (臺南西來庵), was demolished. The event marked a turning point in Japanese policy from forced pacification to full integration of Taiwan into the Japanese Empire.

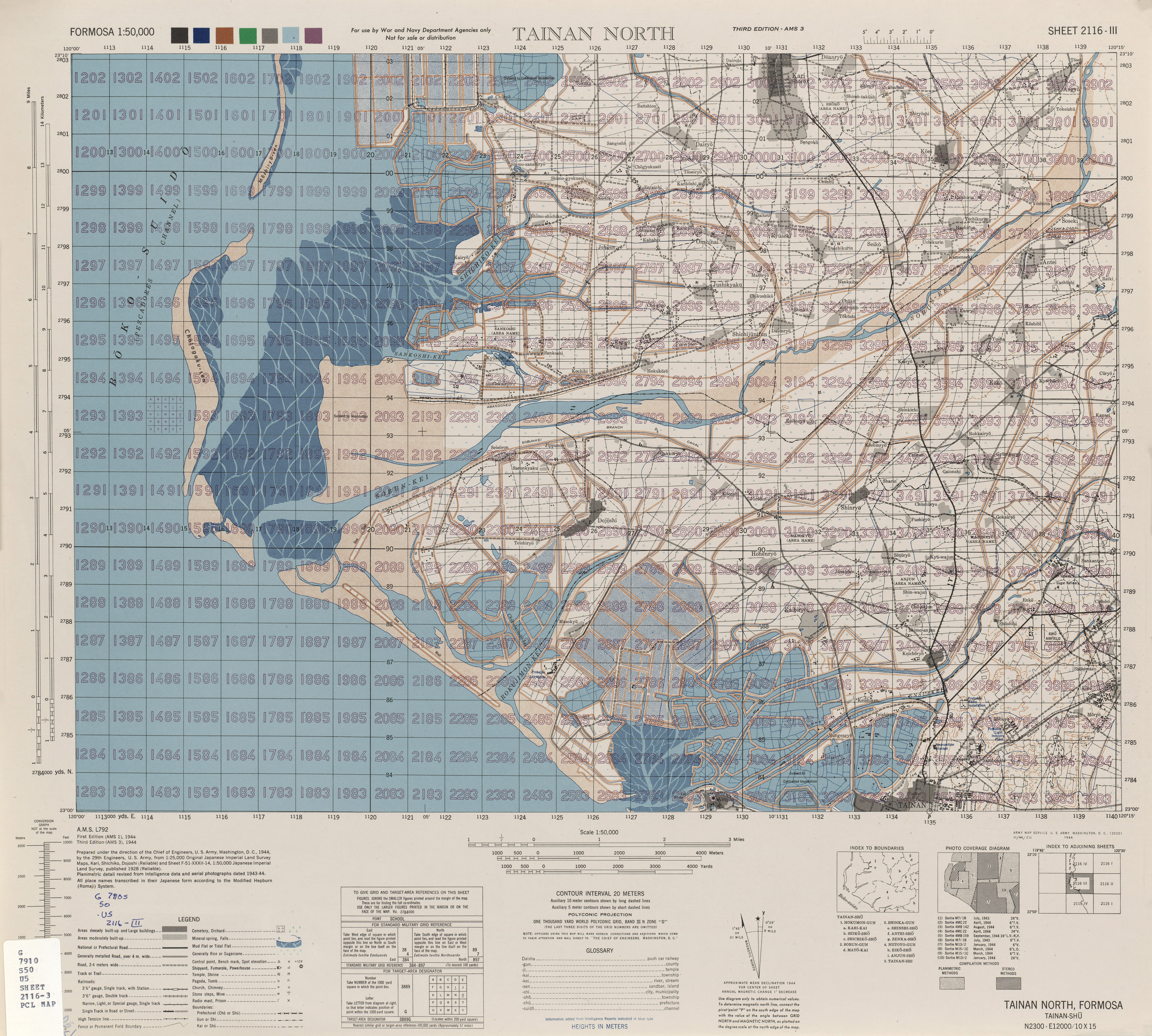
Map of northern Tainan and surrounding region (1944)

The Japanese renamed the city to Tainan Chō (臺南廳) in 1901, and then Tainan Shū (臺南州) in 1920. Tainan Prefecture included modern-day Yunlin, Chiayi, and the wider region of Tainan. Tainan served as the capital city. The Japanese transformed Tainan by building modern infrastructure, including schools, a courthouse, city hall, new telecommunication facilities, an extensive freight and passenger rail network, a new Anping canal replacing the Go-tiau-kang, an airport, and an irrigation system across the Tainan and Chiayi regions. Modern urban designs were introduced; old narrow streets and city walls were demolished and replaced with wide streets that form the cityscape of the modern-day Tainan city center. They also introduced much needed sanitary reforms.

=== Republic of China ===
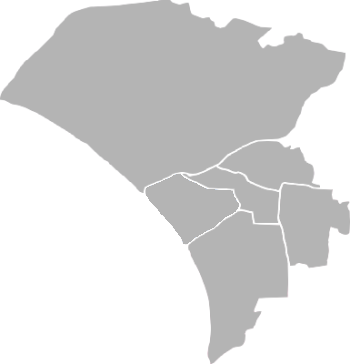
Tainan City in 1945–2010

The Republic of China (ROC) took over Taiwan on October 25, 1945, after World War II. Tainan City and Tainan County were established and became separate local entities under Taiwan Province in 1946. There was civil unrest in Tainan as part of the February 28 Incident in 1947. Tang De-Jhang, an ethnic Japanese man and Japanese educated lawyer, was a member of government which set up "The February 28 Incident Commission" and a popular candidate for city mayor, was accused of being a separatist and arrested by the ROC army on March 11. He was tortured and executed the next day in the park in front of Tainan City Hall (now named Tang Te-chang Memorial Park). Tang was posthumously pronounced not guilty by court later in March. Like other regions in Taiwan, many people in Tainan suffered for their real or perceived opposition to the Kuomintang (KMT, Chinese Nationalist Party) during the autocratic era.

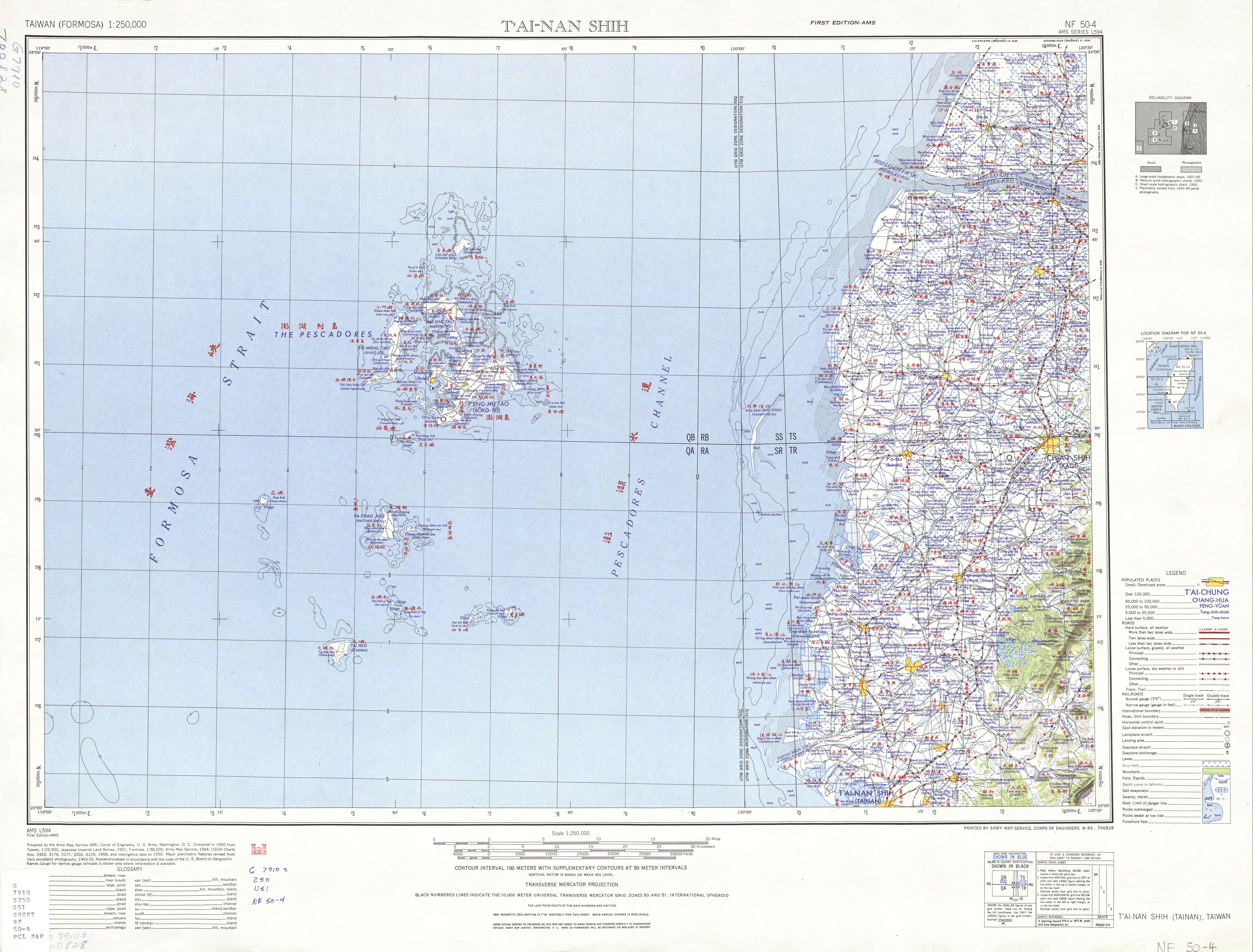
Map of northern Tainan and surrounding region (1950)

The city held its first councilor and mayoral elections in 1950. In the 1960s, Tainan was overtaken by Kaohsiung as the economic center of southern Taiwan due to the redevelopment of Kaohsiung port. While Tainan City struggled through the second half of twentieth century, the county, especially the river south region, benefited from prioritization by national programs. The completion of the National Highway No. 1 was followed by the building of many industrial parks and other road improvements. As a result, the city sprawled inland into North, East and then the Yongkang and Rende districts.

In 1992, a redevelopment plan in the West district, to widen Haian Rd and build an underground plaza proved a failure as lack of geological surveying and overall planning meant that the works ran into a layer of groundwater. The development destroyed part of the historic Go-tiau-kang area. As a consequence, the Zhongzheng Road district, previously the most popular shopping precinct in Tainan since Japanese rule, went into decline due to the poor quality of the environment. By the mid-1990s, there was a growing awareness of the need to protect Tainan's historical and cultural treasures. Since then, the government and civil societies have worked to protect Tainan's heritage. It is an ongoing issue for Tainan to protect its past while reviving its old business center.

Following the establishment of the Southern Taiwan Science Park in 1995, the outskirt of the city saw a rapid growth in population through the 2000s. The city became more prosperous after the completion of several major transport infrastructure plans. The city center shifted eastward in the mid-1990s, closer to the densely populated Yongkang, East and North districts. There are several redevelopment plans to transform these districts into the new business centers of the city.

On March 19, 2004, President Chen Shui-bian was shot while campaigning for reelection in Tainan, a city that has been a major center for the pro-independent movement since the end of Japanese rule. On October 21, 2008, Chinese ARATS Vice President Zhang Mingqing was injured when he encountered protesters in Tainan Confucius Temple.

Map of Tainan City before and after December 25, 2010

In June 2009, the Executive Yuan approved the plan to merge Tainan County and Tainan City to form a larger municipality of Tainan City. On December 25, 2010, Tainan County and Tainan City merged to become Tainan special municipality.

On February 6, 2016, the area was hit by a 6.4 magnitude earthquake, causing 116 fatalities and major damage, including building collapses (see 2016 Kaohsiung earthquake).

== Culture ==
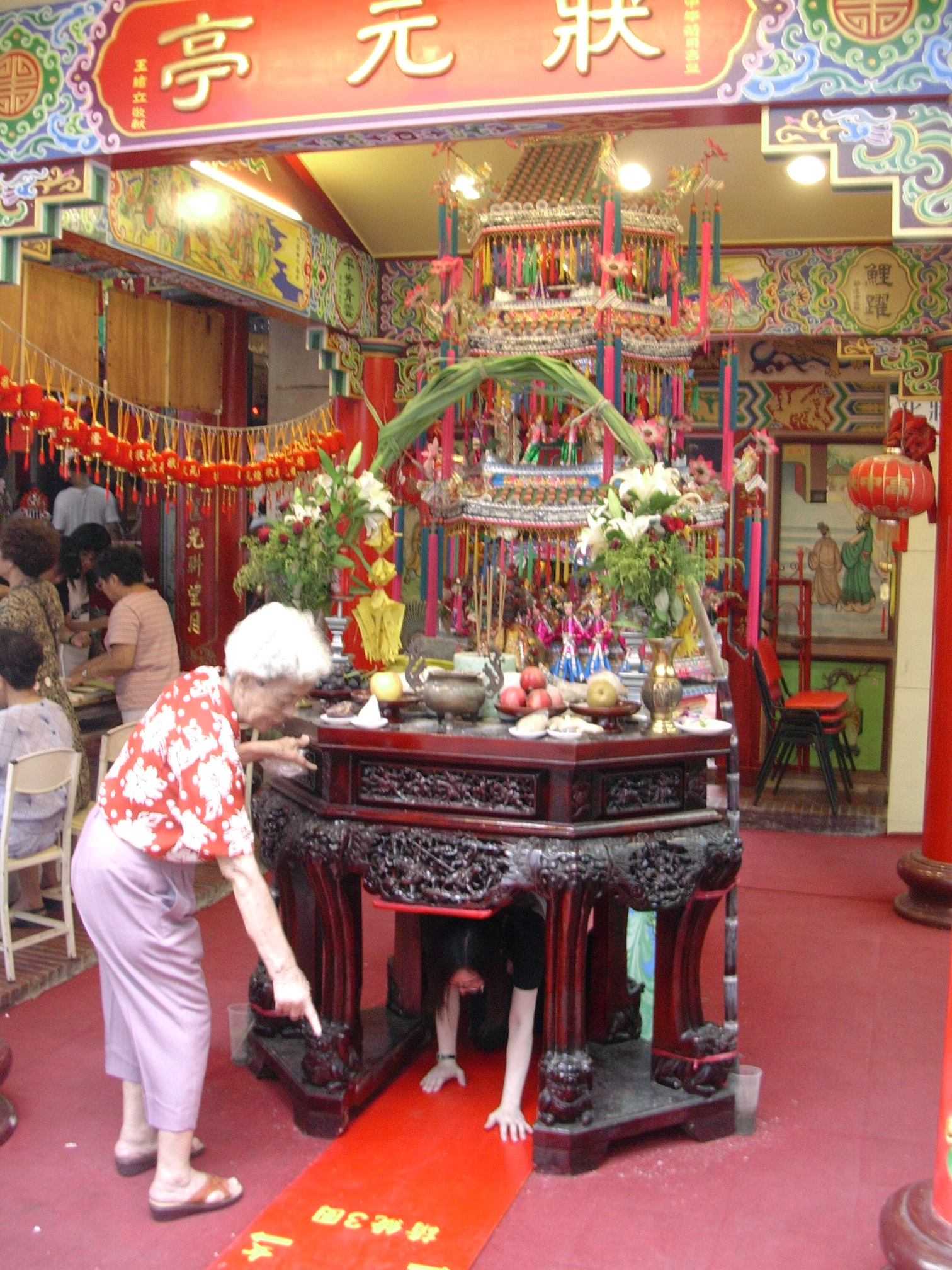
Ritual adulthood celebration for all 16-year-olds

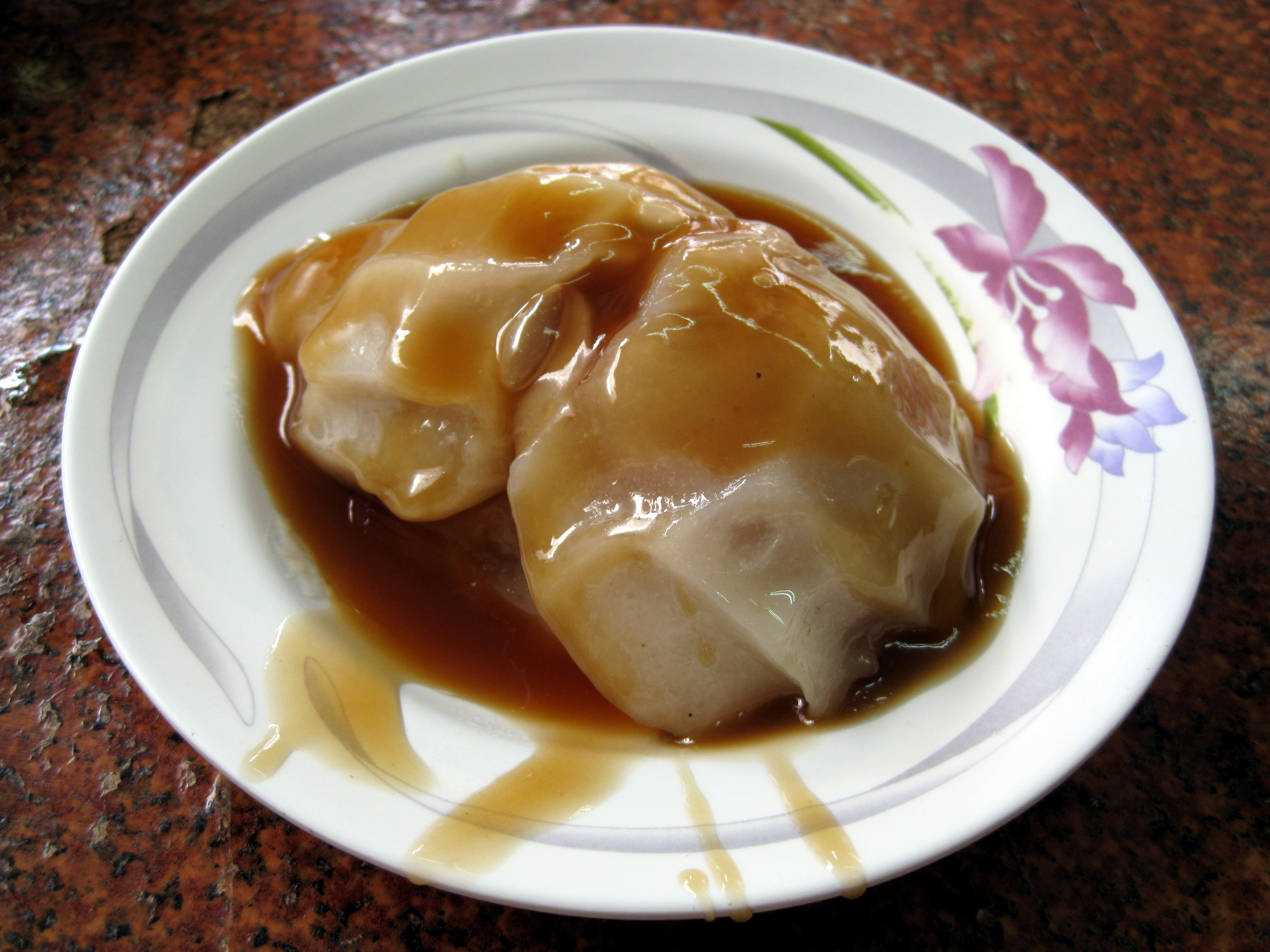
Ba-wan served with sweet sauce

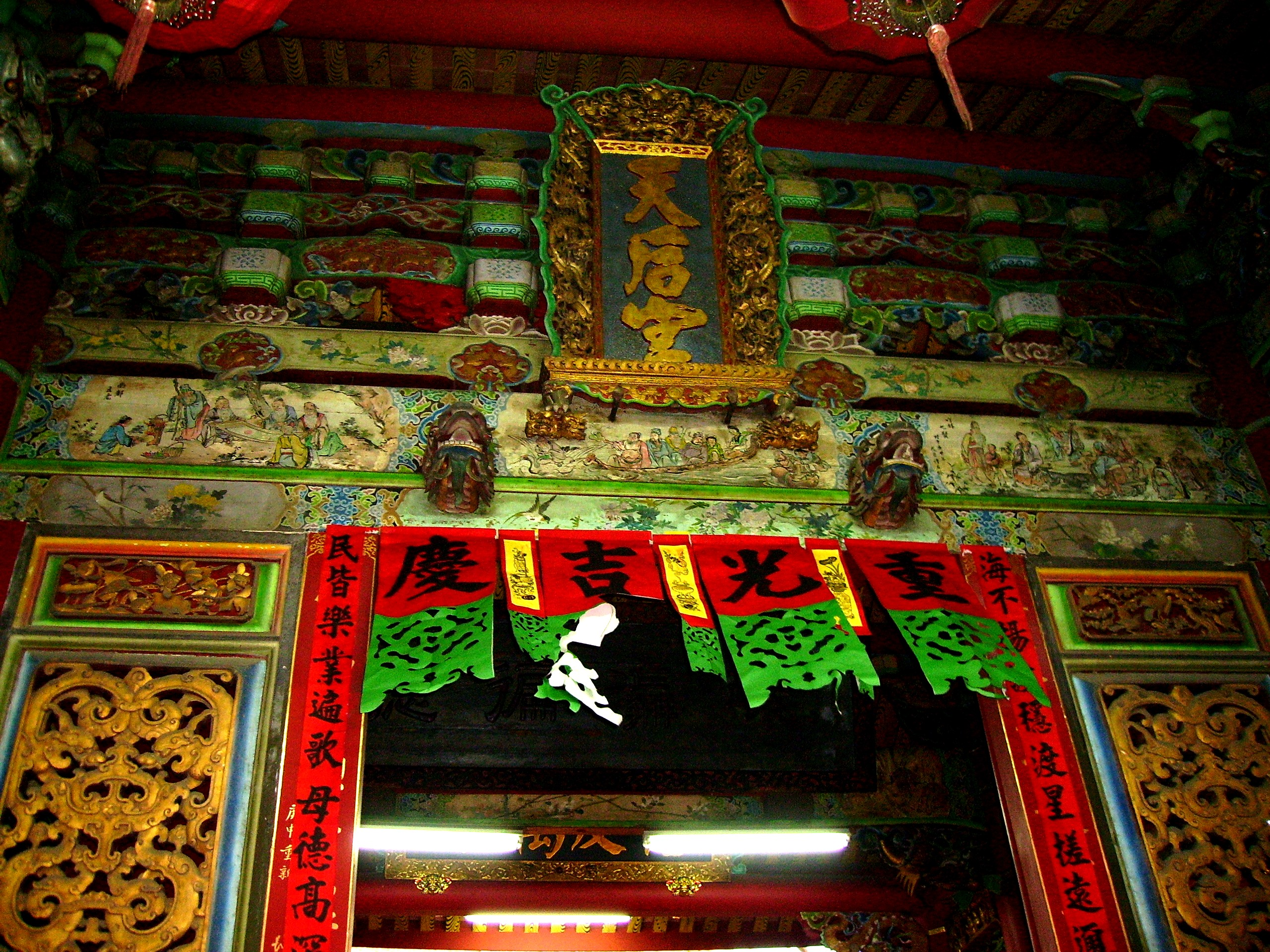
Datianhou Gong, built in 1664

Tainan claims its name as one of the Taiwanese cultural capitals for its abundant historic monument and citizen lifestyle. The city is dotted by Taoist temples, Buddhist temples and churches. Many of them are among the oldest in Taiwan. The city also has its own unique traditions and cuisines developed by Chinese frontiers over its long history.

=== Folk cultures ===
The lives of Tainan citizens are closely related to many Chinese Deities and temples. Parents bring their children to the "Weaving Maid Goddess" (Chinese: 七娘媽; Pe̍h-ōe-jī: Chhit-niû-má), the children's goddess, to wish for goodwill. Traditionally Chinese people step into adulthood when they are 20. In Tainan, there is a large ritual celebration for all 16-year-olds on the seventh day of the seventh lunar month, the goddess's birthday. This extended celebration is unique to Tainan: In the past, families with children working in the harbour took the advantage of this ceremony to show the employers that their children should be paid in adult rate after this day.

Before any form of examination, people visit the temple of Wenchangdijun, the God of Literature, to pray for blessings of good grades. One of the Wenchang temples is on the top floor of the Fort Provintia. Many final-year high school students preparing for university exams visit the temple in June, before the exam. Those seeking for good marriage will worship Yuelao, the God of Marriage. People also visit temples for many reasons, from simply praying for good luck to celebrating particular Deity's birthday to even communicating with the Netherworld.

A wedding ceremony in Tainan is a series of complex processes that are very exact and detailed. Both groom and bride need to prepare 12 specific gifts representing different meanings during their engagement ceremony with more to come in the wedding. People believe this complexity is a sign of being civilized.

Anping residents use a special symbol called Sword Lion to keep bad spirits away. During Zheng's regime, Anping was one of Koxinga's main naval stations. When returning home from military drills, soldiers would put lion-face shields on the main gates of their houses and insert their swords crosswise in the lion's mouth. Locals incorporate this symbol into the design of their houses as a symbol of spiritual security.

=== Cuisine ===
During the more than 200 years that Tainan spent as the local capital the population developed cosmopolitan tastes due to exposure to food from around the world. Portions are often larger than elsewhere in Taiwan.

Many well-known Taiwanese food dishes originated in Tainan. Since Tainan was a center of sugar production, Tainan cuisine tends to be sweeter than other Taiwanese cuisines. For example, eel noodle soup has a distinctive sweet and sour taste. Milkfish dishes are very popular in Tainan, where locals also call it "Koxinga's fish" (Chinese: 國姓魚; Pe̍h-ōe-jī: kok-sèng-hî). People believe the Chinese name of the fish (虱目魚; sat-ba̍k-hî) was given by Koxinga, and this name has been loaned into Japanese as sabahī (サバヒー). The fish are bred in farms located in the coastal outskirts of the city. Many Tainan restaurants and snack stands have histories that trace back to the Qing or Japanese eras.

On Guo Hua Street (國華街), a lot of restaurants and street vendors sell local cuisine, including such dishes as "savory rich pudding" (碗粿), o-a-tsian (oyster omelet), gua bao, and popiah. Local people tend to have these dishes either in the morning or at noon.

Tainan is considered the center of Taiwanese coffee culture with a number of coffee producers in the hills around the city. Coffee plants were first brought to Tainan in 1884 by the British.

=== Temples ===
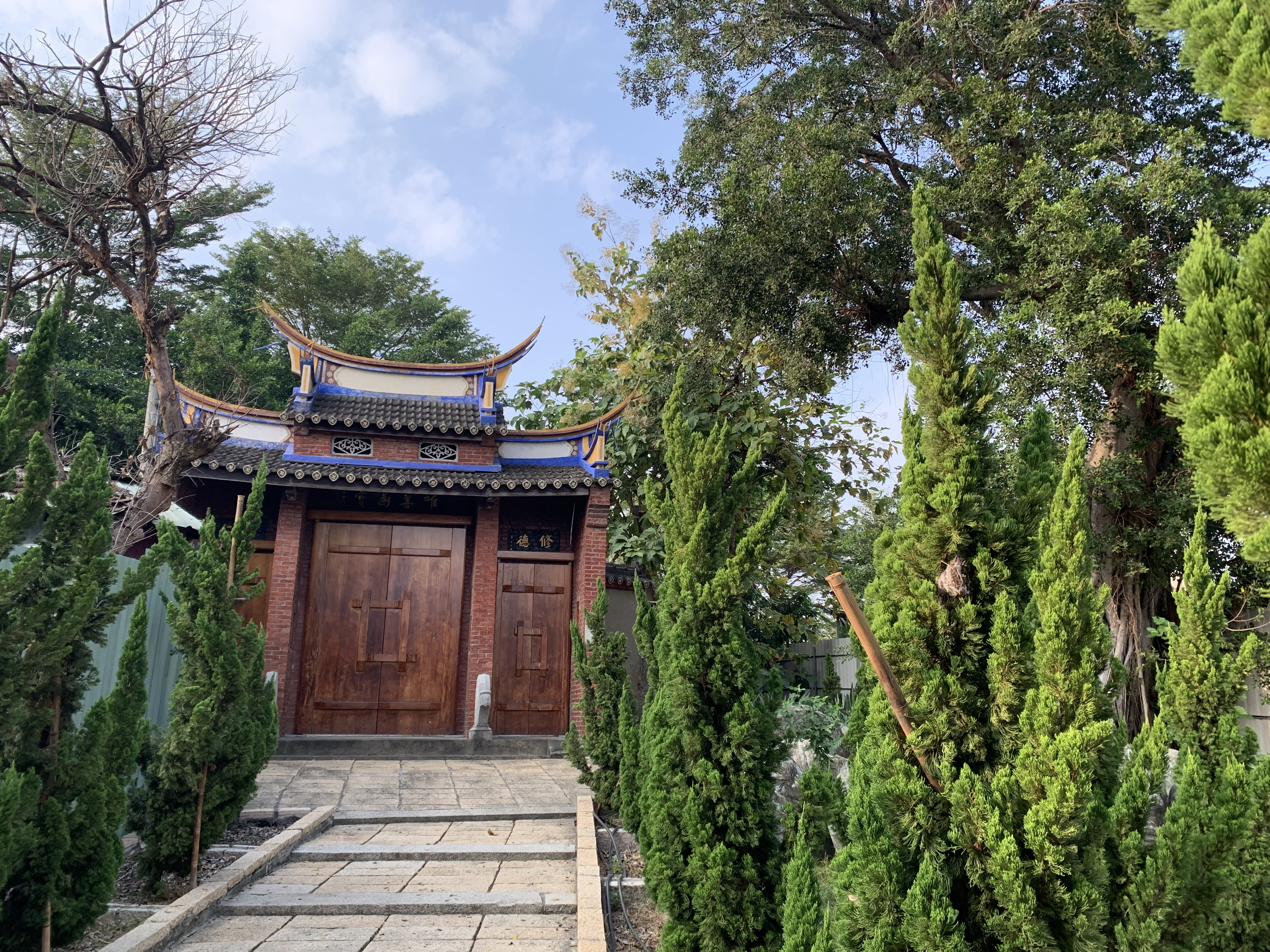
Zhuxi Temple

Tainan is famous for its diversity and density of temples and shrines. Some of them are the only of its kind in Taiwan. In all, there are officially listed seven Buddhist temples and eight Taoist shrines (七寺八廟). As of 2015, Tainan has the most numbers of registered temples among other municipalities, cities or counties in Taiwan, reaching 1,613 temples.

The seven Buddhist temples are:

- Kaiyuan Temple, originally the royal gardens of the Tungning Kingdom, became a Buddhist temple in 1690.
- Zhuxi Temple, founded in the Tungning Kingdom period.
- Fahua Temple, founded in the Tungning Kingdom period.
- Mituo Temple, founded in the Tungning Kingdom period.
- Longshan Temple, founded in the Qing dynasty.
- Chongqing Temple, founded in the Qing dynasty.
- Huangbo Temple, founded in the Qing dynasty but demolished by the Japanese. The worshiped statues were migrated to the Altar of Heaven temple.

The eight Taoist shrines are:

- Grand Matsu Temple (大天后宮), dedicated to the Goddess of Sea, Mazu. Originally the residence of the King Ningjing of the Tungning Kingdom.
- Sidian Wumiao (祀典武廟), the Official Martial God temple, dedicated to Lord Guan, was built in 1665.
- Dongyue Dian (東嶽殿), the Lord of Underworld temple, dedicated to Dongyue Dadi, was built in 1673.
- Fuchenghuang Temple (府城隍廟), the temple of the Prefecture City God, was built in 1669.
- Longwang Temple (龍王廟), the shrine dedicated to the Dragon King of Eastern Sea, was built in 1716 but demolished by the Japanese.
- Fongshen Temple (風神廟), the God of Wind temple, was built in 1739. This is the only temple in Taiwan that dedicated to the God of Wind.
- Yaowang Temple (藥王廟), the God of Medicine temple, was built in 1685.
- Shuisian Temple (水仙宮), the Water Deities temple, built during the Qing dynasty after Go-tiau-kang was constructed.

There are many other well-known temples and shrines not on this list, such as Anping District's Tianhou Temple (supposedly the oldest on Taiwan proper), the Altar of Heaven temple (天壇), and the re-built Xilai temple (西來庵) etc. They are all the centers of faith in Tainan.

Due to its abundant numbers of temples and shrines, the traditional temple decoration crafters and their business flourishes in Tainan. There are existing masters still passing on their knowledge and skills to preserve the temples in the traditional way.

=== Music ===
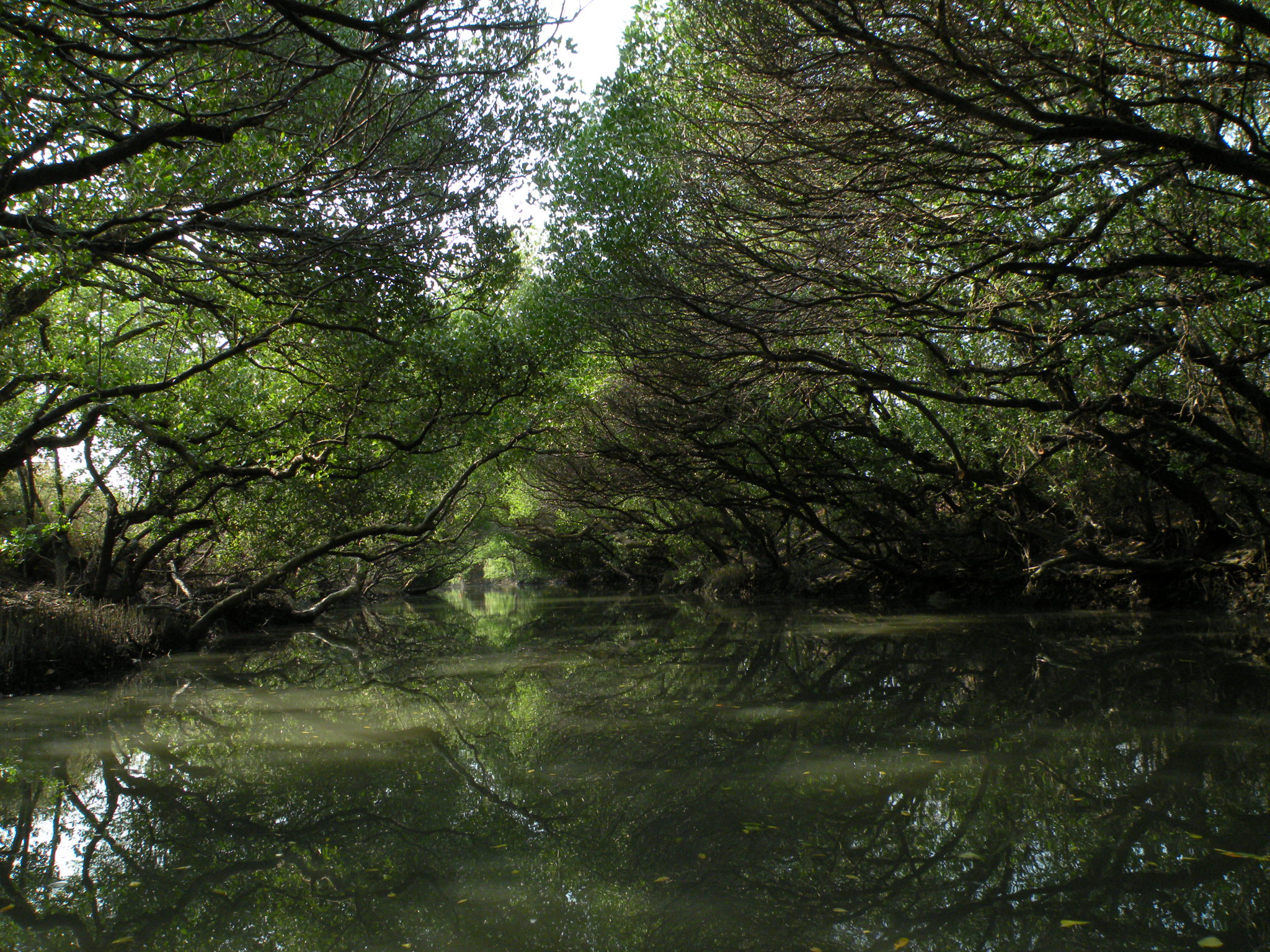
Taijiang National Park, Sicao green tunnel of Manggroves

Nanyin and Shisanyin were the first types of Chinese music introduced to Tainan; Nanyin is performed mostly for entertainment while Shisanyin is performed in the Confucius worship ceremony. There are two Nanyin clubs in Tainan: Zhenshengshe, a 200-year-old club once dissolved in the 1980s for ten years which then returned with the support from younger generation musicians and Nanshengshe, a 95-year-old club performing globally.

Music performance is being promoted in Tainan. Tainan City has its own Chinese orchestra and symphony orchestra. There are also private performance groups such as Chimei Mandolin Performance Group, Chimei Philharmonic Orchestra and Chang Jung Christianity University Symphony Orchestra.

Ten Drum Art Percussion Group (十鼓擊樂團) is a percussion performance group established in the year 2000. The group is dedicated in producing percussion performances that highlights the history, the culture and the image of Taiwan. The group first performed internationally in the festivals during the 2000 Sydney Olympic Games. Following this event, the group has performed in many occasions both internationally and domestically. The group has its own campus located in an old sugar factory in Rende District. The campus provides education on percussion performances at all levels and regular performances to general public.

=== Museums and parks ===
On top of its plentiful living culture, Tainan host several museums and parks. The National Museum of Taiwan Literature is in the former city hall; National Museum of Taiwan History is in the Annan district; Chimei Museum is in the Rende district; Taijiang National Park follows the coast; Anping Historic Scenic Park includes the entire old Anping town and the north ward of Anping harbor; and Siraya National Scenic Area includes the Wusanto Reservoir built by Yoichi Hatta. In the city center, many historic monuments from Zheng's regime, the Qing dynasty, and the Japanese colonial era are preserved including the Confucius temple, two major city gates and former city hall.

== Tourism ==
Tourism in Tainan is tied to its status as the first capital of Taiwan and its abundance of heritage and cultural assets. The city contains multiple historical locations such as the island's first Confucian temple and first Taoist temple, and several old Dutch forts. The city is also the site of several religious festivals.

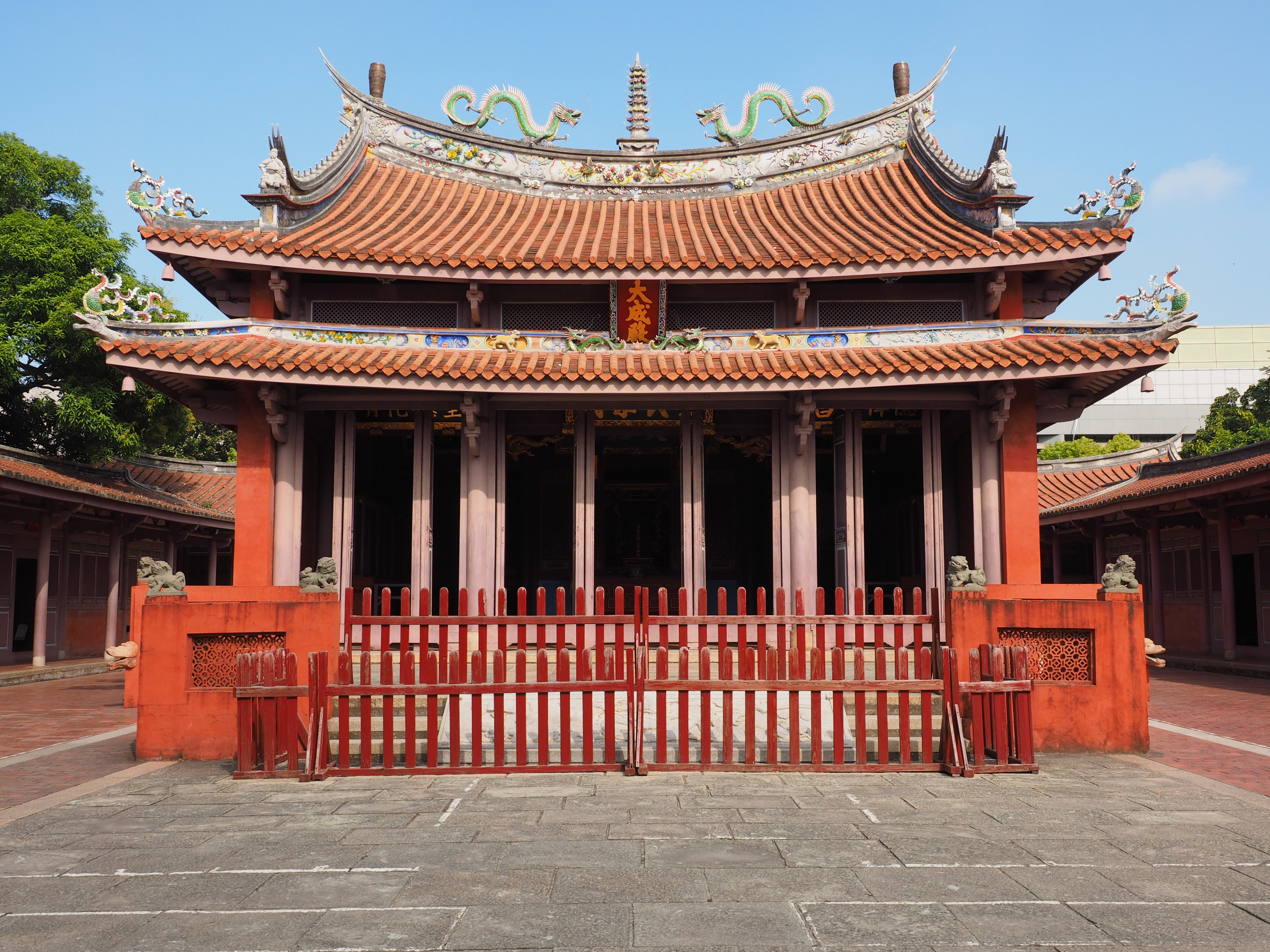
Tainan's Taiwan Confucian Temple

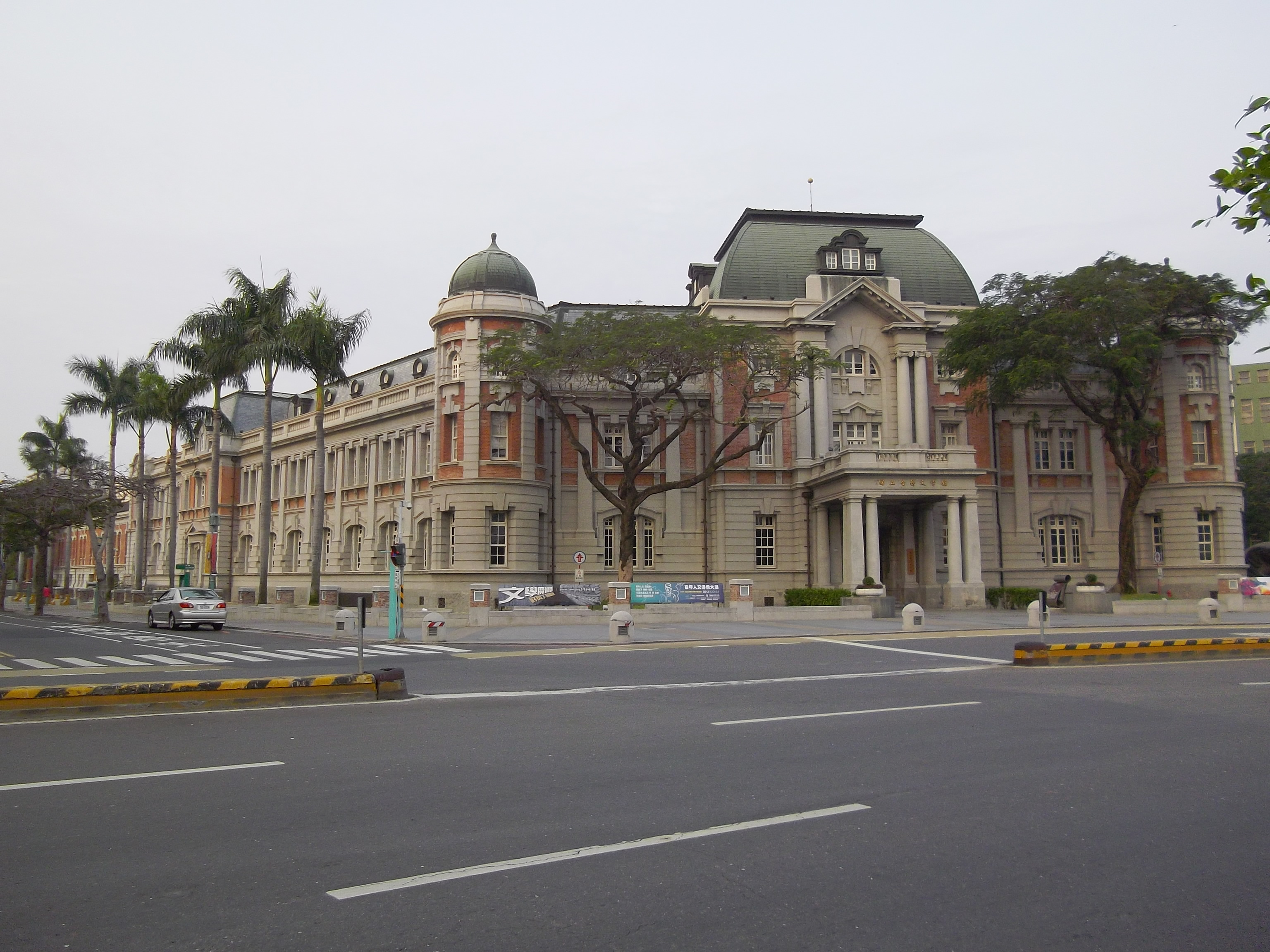
National Museum of Taiwan Literature

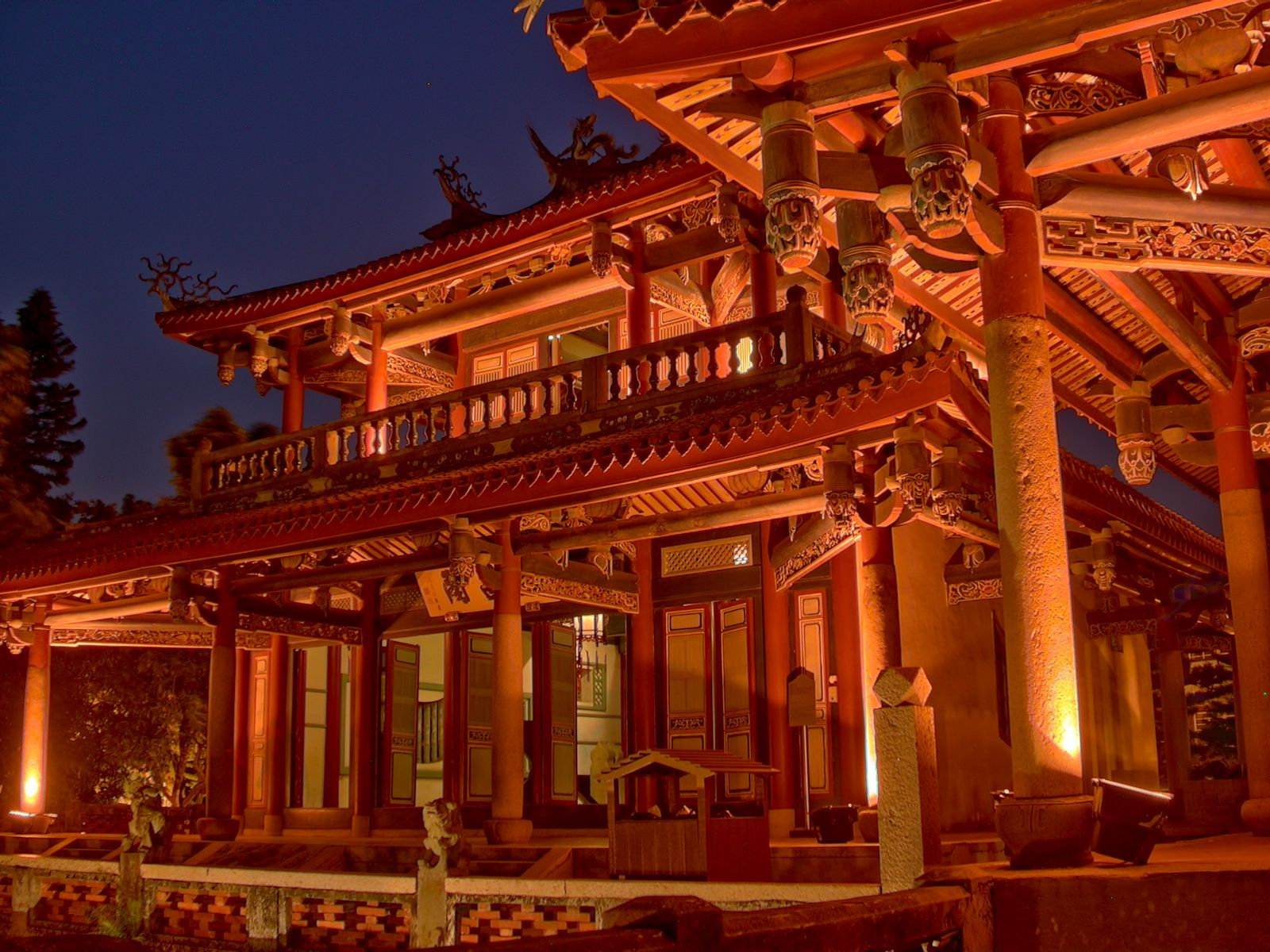
Fort Provintia is located at West Central District.

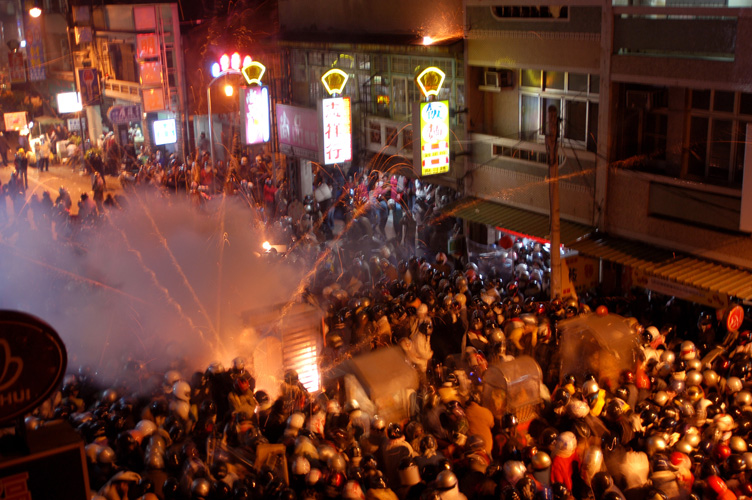
Bee hives shoot out rapidly in the downtown of Yanshuei District.

=== Taiwan Confucian Temple ===
The Taiwan Confucian Temple (or the Scholarly Temple) was built in 1665 by Cheng Ching, son of Koxinga, to offer lectures and cultivate intellectuals. It was the first learning institute for children when Taiwan was ruled by the Qing dynasty. As a result, it is also called the First Academy of Taiwan.

The temple is a popular tourist attraction and preserves ancient Confucian ceremonies, which are conducted regularly. The grounds include storerooms for the ritual implements and musical instruments that are used in these ceremonies.

=== National Museum of Taiwan History ===
The National Museum of Taiwan History is located in the Annan District. The construction of the Exhibition and Education Building began in 2005, and opened on October 29, 2011. The main objectives of this museum include collection, categorization, preservation, research, exhibition, education and promotion of artifacts related to Taiwan's history and culture for both locals and visitors.

=== National Museum of Taiwan Literature ===
The National Museum of Taiwan Literature researches, catalogs, preserves, and exhibits local literary artifacts as part of its multilingual, multi-ethnic focus. The museum is housed in the former Tainan City Hall, constructed in 1916 and famous for its historical significance.

=== National Cheng Kung University Museum ===
The National Cheng Kung University Museum is located at the National Cheng Kung University. One of the youngest museums in Tainan. Exhibits important objects from the history of education in southern Taiwan. The museum is ICOM member since 2016.

=== Fort Provintia ===
Fort Provintia was built in 1653 by the Dutch during their colonization of Taiwan and was eventually surrendered to Koxinga. Since 1945, the site has been known as "Chihkan Tower", a phonetic derivation from "Sakam" (also spelled "Chakam" or "Sakkam"). In addition to the site's architectural and artistic significance, its library of dictionaries and business transactions documents the Siraya language spoken by the native inhabitants of the region during Dutch rule.

=== Shopping and recreation ===
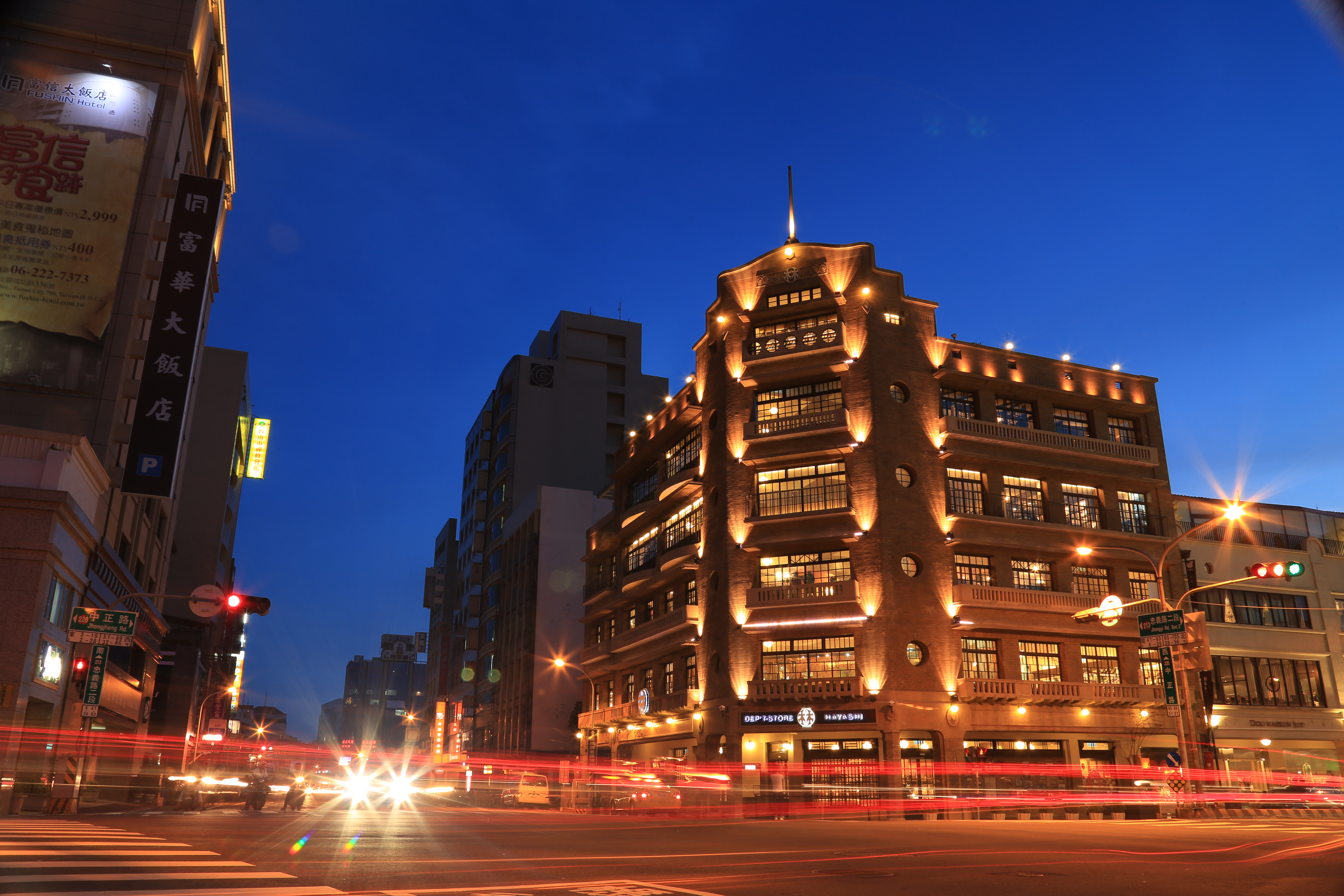
One of the oldest department stores in Tainan, built during Japanese Taiwan era.

As Tainan is one of the larger metropolitan areas in Taiwan, it has many department stores, shopping malls and prestigious boutiques. Several of the best-known luxury brands have branches or counters in Tainan. Flower Night Market is one of the most famous Night markets in Taiwan and it is often considered to be the largest night market in Taiwan; however, unlike the others, this night market is open for business three days a week – Thursday, Saturday and Sunday.

=== Beehives ===
In Yanshuei District, the most important and prominent fireworks in Lantern Festival are the so-called "beehives", essentially multiple launchers of bottle rockets. These rocket forts are actually thousands of bottle rockets arranged row atop row in an iron-and-wooden framework. The set-up looks like a beehive full of unleashed gunpowder. When the contraption is ignited, rockets shoot out rapidly in all directions. Dazzling explosives whiz and whirl across the sky and often into the crowd itself, both thrilling and intimidating the spectators.

== Climate ==
Tainan has a warm humid subtropical climate, tropical wet and dry climate near (Köppen Aw) with mild, dry winters and hot, humid summers. Beyond south of the city, the climate transitions from subtropical to tropical.

Climate data for Tainan (1991–2020 normals, extremes 1897–present）
Month	Jan	Feb	Mar	Apr	May	Jun	Jul	Aug	Sep	Oct	Nov	Dec	Year
Record high °C (°F)	32.4 (90.3)	32.8 (91.0)	36.1 (97.0)	35.4 (95.7)	37.2 (99.0)	37.8 (100.0)	37.2 (99.0)	37.2 (99.0)	36.6 (97.9)	36.0 (96.8)	35.2 (95.4)	32.9 (91.2)	37.8 (100.0)
Mean daily maximum °C (°F)	22.9 (73.2)	24.0 (75.2)	26.5 (79.7)	29.3 (84.7)	31.4 (88.5)	32.4 (90.3)	33.1 (91.6)	32.6 (90.7)	32.5 (90.5)	30.8 (87.4)	28.1 (82.6)	24.4 (75.9)	29.0 (84.2)
Daily mean °C (°F)	17.8 (64.0)	18.9 (66.0)	21.6 (70.9)	24.9 (76.8)	27.5 (81.5)	28.9 (84.0)	29.4 (84.9)	28.9 (84.0)	28.6 (83.5)	26.3 (79.3)	23.4 (74.1)	19.6 (67.3)	24.7 (76.4)
Mean daily minimum °C (°F)	14.5 (58.1)	15.5 (59.9)	18.0 (64.4)	21.7 (71.1)	24.7 (76.5)	26.3 (79.3)	26.7 (80.1)	26.3 (79.3)	26.0 (78.8)	23.3 (73.9)	20.3 (68.5)	16.3 (61.3)	21.6 (70.9)
Record low °C (°F)	2.6 (36.7)	2.4 (36.3)	5.1 (41.2)	8.9 (48.0)	14.7 (58.5)	18.9 (66.0)	21.1 (70.0)	19.3 (66.7)	15.4 (59.7)	12.6 (54.7)	2.9 (37.2)	4.3 (39.7)	2.4 (36.3)
Average precipitation mm (inches)	20.9 (0.82)	23.7 (0.93)	31.1 (1.22)	69.1 (2.72)	160.1 (6.30)	369.5 (14.55)	353.5 (13.92)	478.9 (18.85)	167.6 (6.60)	24.6 (0.97)	26.9 (1.06)	15.6 (0.61)	1,741.5 (68.55)
Average precipitation days (≥ 0.1 mm)	3.9	4.2	4.3	5.7	9.0	12.2	12.5	15.8	8.0	2.4	2.6	2.7	83.3
Average relative humidity (%)	75	75.5	73.8	74.6	75.3	77.2	76.1	78.3	75.2	72.8	74.5	73.7	75.2
Mean monthly sunshine hours	177.5	163.4	180.7	178.2	195.8	196.3	208.8	175.4	184.8	201.1	170.6	170.3	2,202.9
Source: Central Weather Bureau

== Cityscape ==
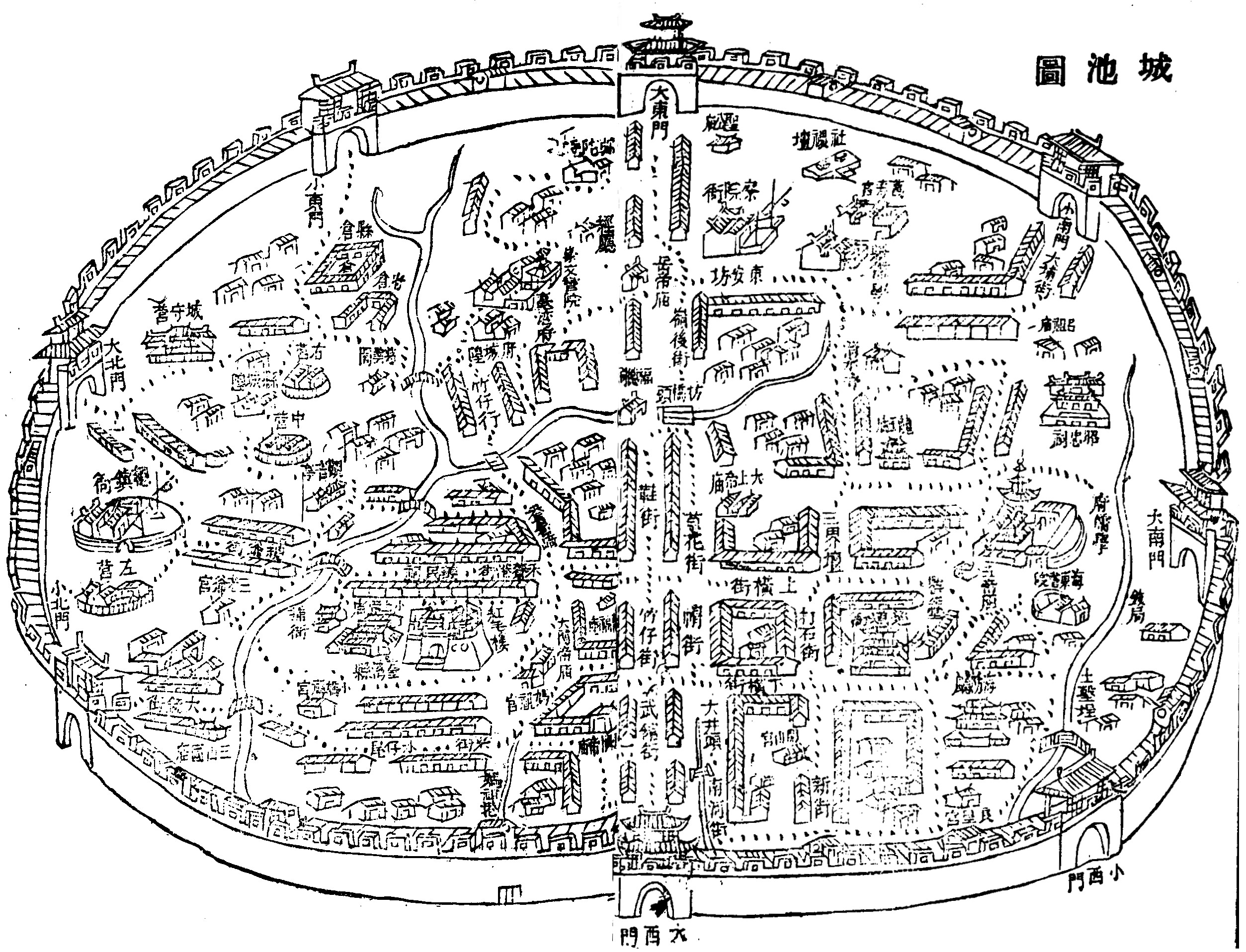
Map of Tainan during the Qing dynasty

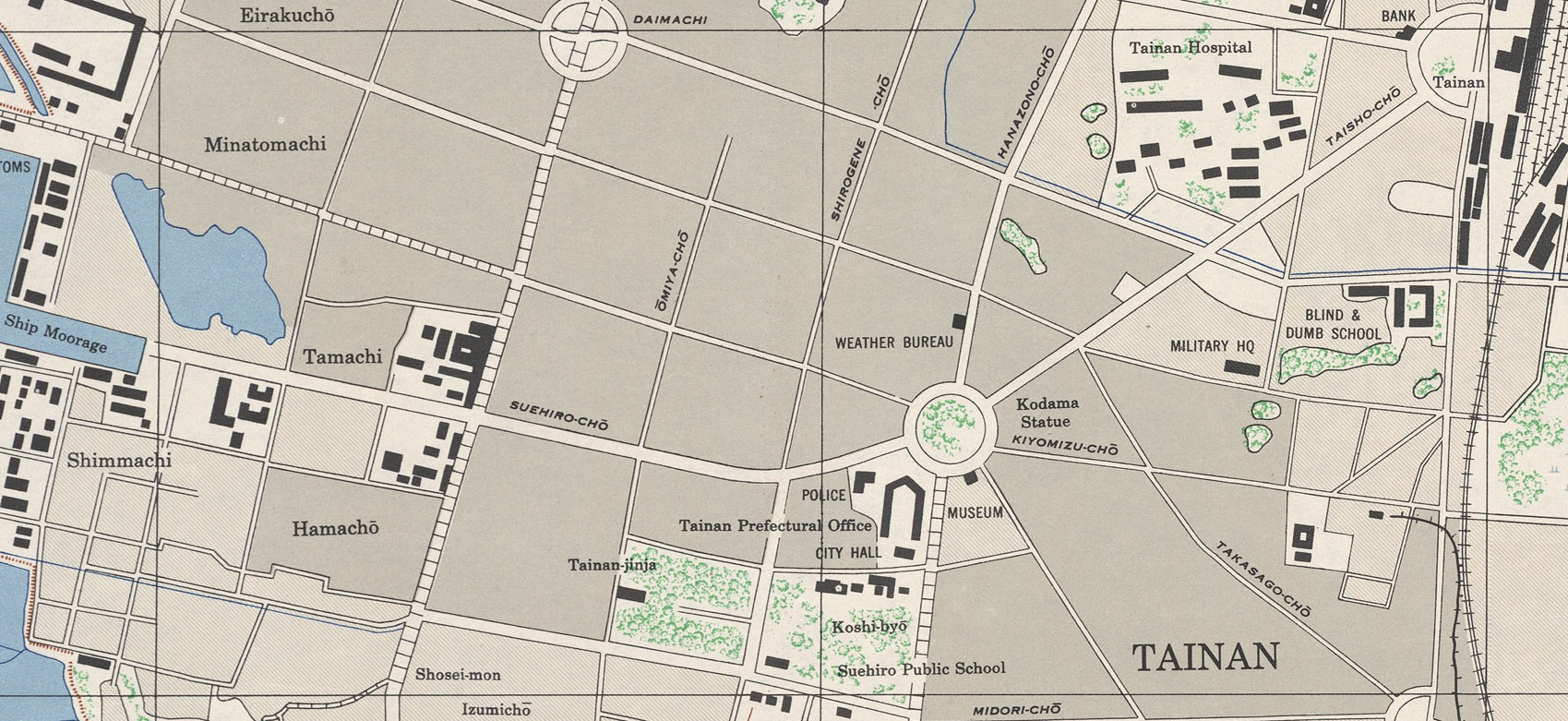
Tainan city center during WWII

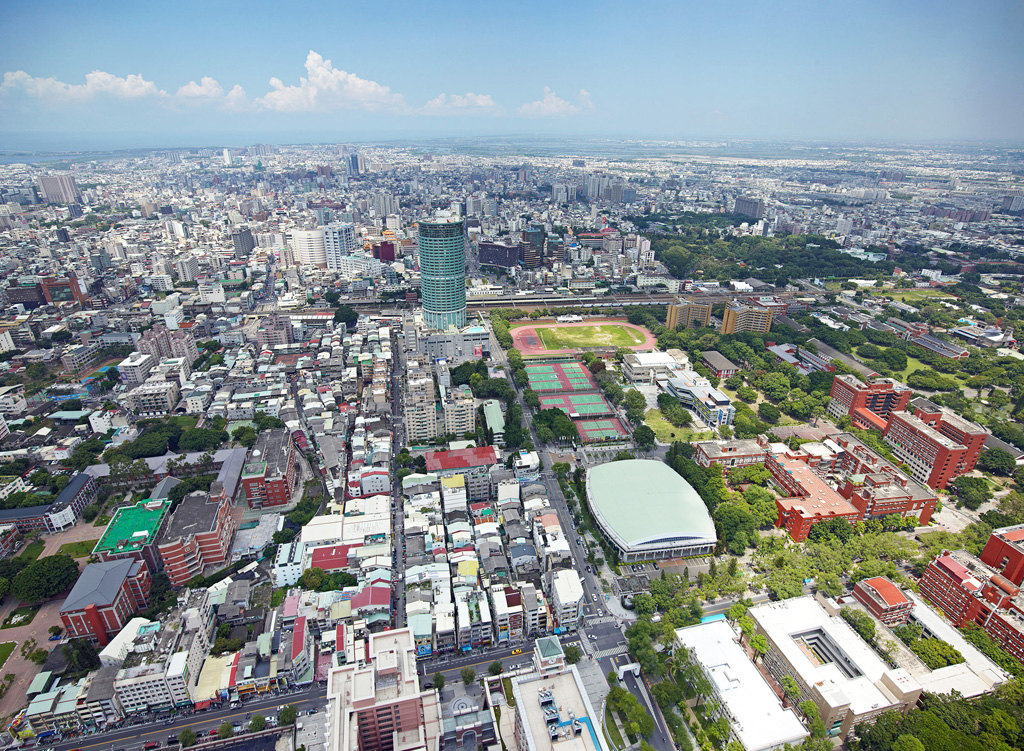
Downtown Tainan

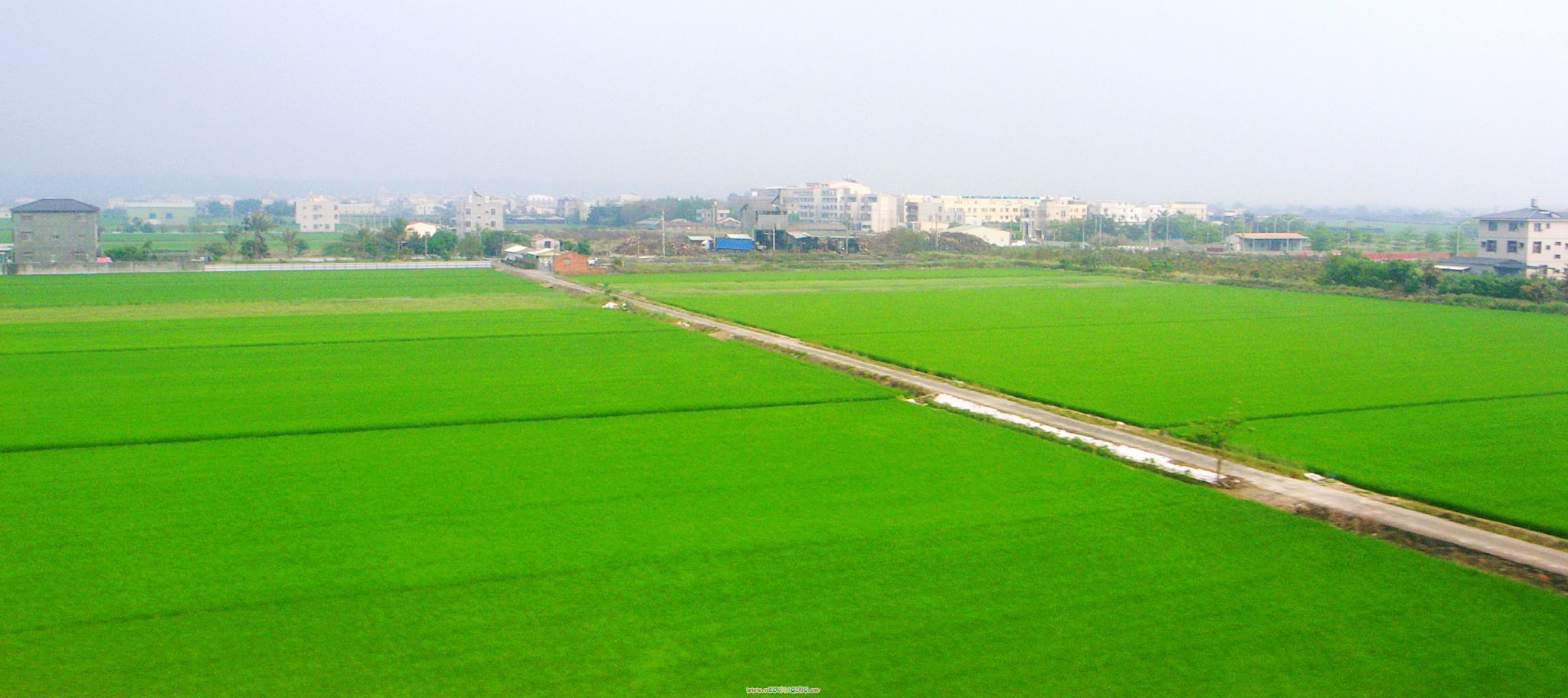
A typical scene of River North Region

=== The Great Cross Street ===
The earliest plan of the city was designed by Dutch colonist Cornelis Jansz. Plockhoy, the designer of this new settlement, laid a 25-30m wide main street (on today's Minquan Rd Sec. 2) across the settlement and radial roads than ran deep into agricultural developments. The Han Chinese settlement “Heliaogang Jie” (today's Zhongyi Rd) later crossed the main street of Provintia and formed the so-called Shizi Dajie (十字大街) or The Great Cross Street. With the fall of the Ming dynasty, new migrants flooded into the settlement. Chinese population boomed from 5,000 to 35,000 between 1640 and 1661. As a result, farmers, deer hunters, traders and craftsmen each formed a colony on the cross street.

Due to the Chinese tradition where different trades and regions worship different Taoist gods, the city later developed into neighborhoods, each with own center temple. Now, after 300 years of Chinese migration, the city has become a showcase of both Taoist and Chinese Buddhist temples. Although the city has transformed dramatically since the late 19th century, the temples remain because of their importance to the locals. Some of the early administration centers have also been transformed into temples for political and social reasons. An administrative building of the Tungning Kingdom became temple of the sea goddess, and the location where Tungning Kingdom performed annual ceremonies of prayer to Heaven is now the Altar of Heaven Temple. Castle Provintia, one of two Dutch forts in Tainan, now has a sea god temple and a literacy god temple built on top of it, creating East-West fusion architecture. Many Han Chinese religious and historic monuments can be found near the old cross street centered by the Castle Provintia.

=== Japanese Redevelopment Program ===
The cityscape of modern Tainan was founded under the urban redevelopment programs carried out by Japanese colonial government. The city center adopted a Baroque design similar to the Paris renovation in mid 19th century, the plan connected major facilities via a system of wide streets and five square-roundabouts. Among the five squares, Taishō Park (大正公園; modern-day Tang Te-chang Memorial Park) at the center is the most important crossing point. The square is surrounded by the city hall, the fire brigade and the weather bureau. It is connected by a number of avenues heading towards the train station, the airport, military bases and the dock at the end of the Anping cannel. With the police station and the court nearby, this area demonstrated the power of the colonial government within the city. The financial district was located in Shirokanechō (白金町) and Ōmiyachō (大宮町) between Taishō park and Anping cannel along Ginzadōri (銀座通り), the modern day Zhongzheng Rd. It was the busiest street of the city from Japanese rule to the mid-1990s. Many Colonial Baroque style historic buildings from Japanese era can be found in this part of the city.

=== Three Ring Belts ===
A three-belt system was adopted by the provincial city official: the green boulevard ring, the blue belt Anping cannel and the Zhonghua road system. The green boulevard ring and Zhonghua road system first appeared on the 1937 city redevelopment plan proposed by the Japanese colonial government.

The green boulevard was a Japanese response to the garden city trend of early 20th century urban planning. This system connects the Shuipingwen Park to the west, Tainan Park to the north, NCKU to the east and the Athletic park complex to the south. Zhonghua Rd system is an arterial road system, the system now connects major new development areas surrounding the old city center. The Anping cannel blue belt was created after the completion of the Fifth redevelopment area. The project of Fifth redevelopment area filled the floodplain of old Taijiang lagoon and extended the Japanese Anping cannel into Kunshen lagoon to form an artificial island, this area is also known as New Anping. In contrast to the low rise old city center, many high rise buildings are built along these three rings.

=== The River South Region ===
Beyond the city center, Tainan city can be divided into two: the River South Region and the River North Region, bounded by the Zengwen River.

River South Region belongs to the Tainan metropolitan area. Satellite towns spread across the region in a radial pattern from the city center. Southern Taiwan Science Park Tainan campus is located at the north of the region. According to the Council for Economic Planning and Development, this region is designated to grow further into suburban sprawl.

=== The River North Region ===
This region is one of the major agricultural centers in Taiwan. There are several regional centers; some of them are as old as Tainan city. These centers are: Xinying, Yujing, Jiali, and Madou.

Xinying was the seat of the former Tainan County Government and currently serves as the administration center for the region. Yujing is a regional center for the hilly districts east of the city; it is famous for its mango and was the scene of the Tapani incident. Jiali is the regional center of the coastal Tainan. It was the base of the Soelangh sub-tribe. Near the bank of the Zengwen River, Madou is the regional center of the lower plain area that bears the name of the river. The town was home to the Mattauw sub-tribe.

== Government and politics ==
Tainan City is a special municipality, which is the highest level local government under Local Government Law of Republic of China. Technically it is at the same level as Province, although Province is being streamlined. The city is led by the elected city mayor and supervised by the city council. Its subdivisions qu or districts do not have the autonomy power, instead they are administration units only. Further to the citywide election, there are urban villages (里 li) and neighborhood (鄰 lin) functioning as primary local autonomy entity.

Currently there are two administration centers, one in Anping District and another in Xinying District. They are former Provincial Tainan city government and Tainan county government respectively. Administration centers manages citywide affairs and developments such as education and city planning. Apart from administration centers, there are district offices functioning as local access point to the governmental services.

The city has generally been seen as a powerbase for the Democratic Progressive Party, especially in nationwide elections. Although before the merger, the Kuomintang (KMT) have always had more seats in the provincial Tainan city council and KMT won the presidential elections (2008) by a narrow margin in the city. On the other hand, Democratic Progressive Party always dominated former Tainan county. In the first municipal election, after the merger, DPP dominated the political demographics of the city. William Lai, a former member of the Legislative Yuan from the DPP won the first mayoral election in 2010.

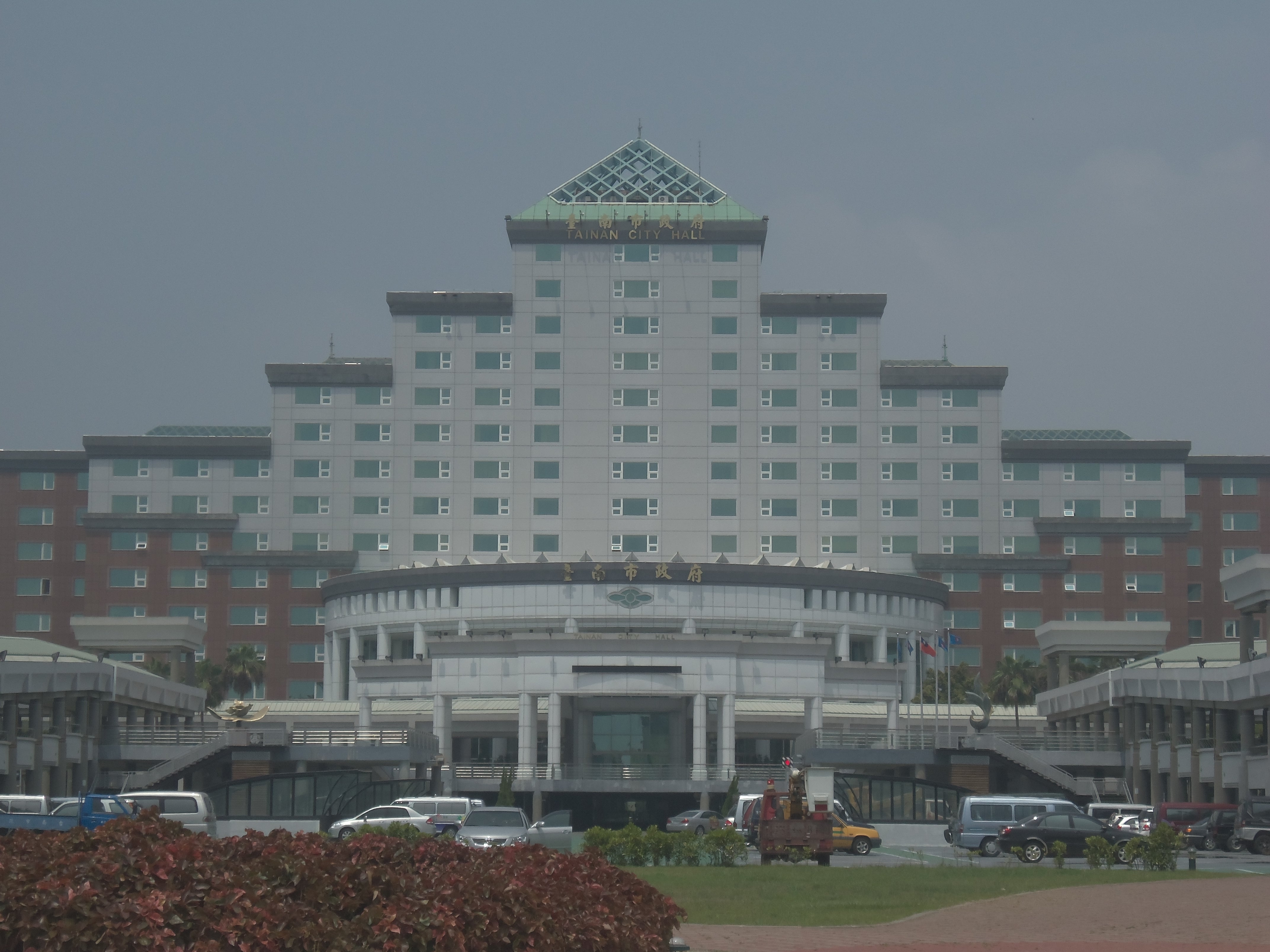
Tainan City Government – Yonghua Civic Center

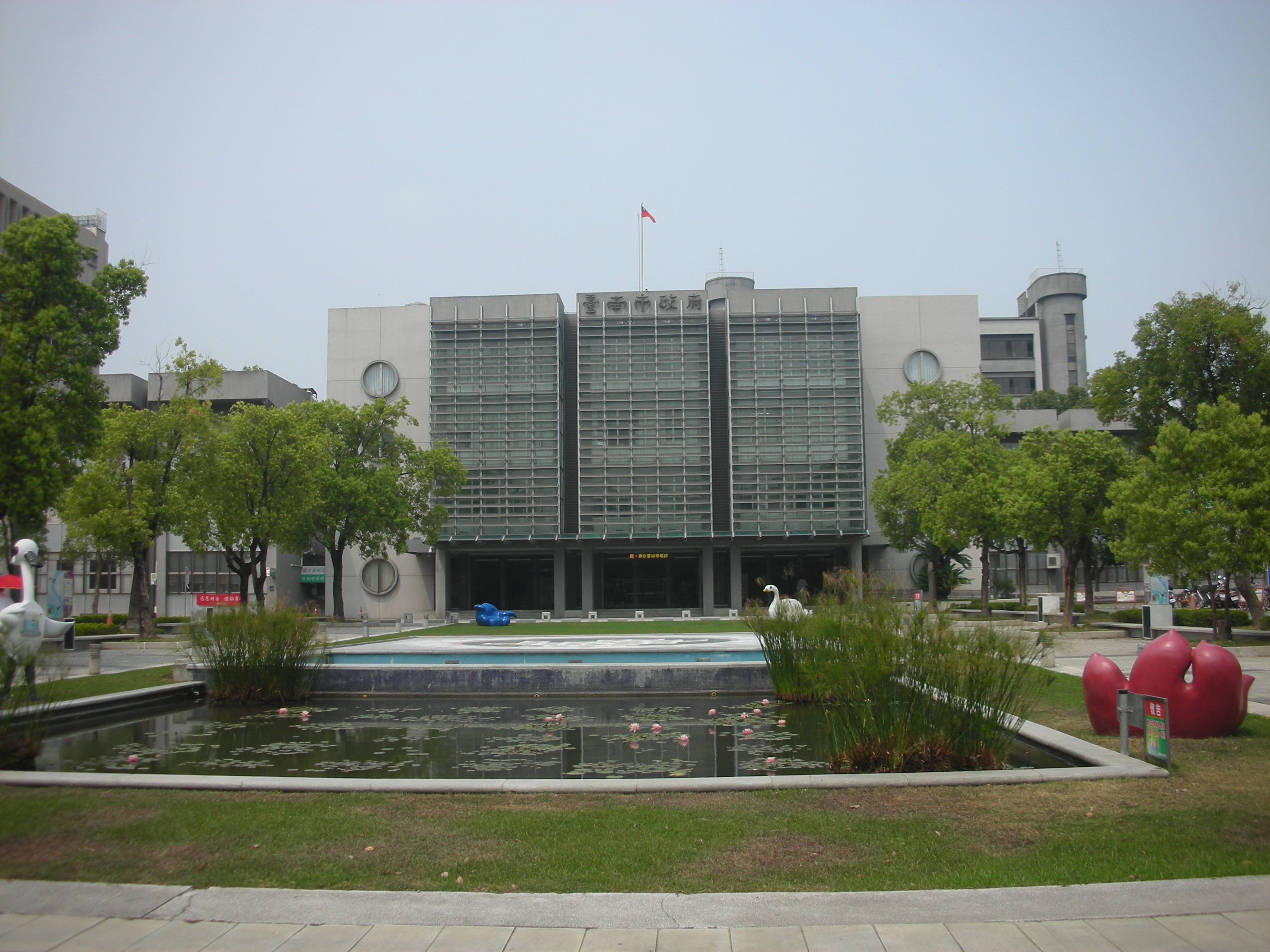
Tainan City Government – Minjhih Civic Center

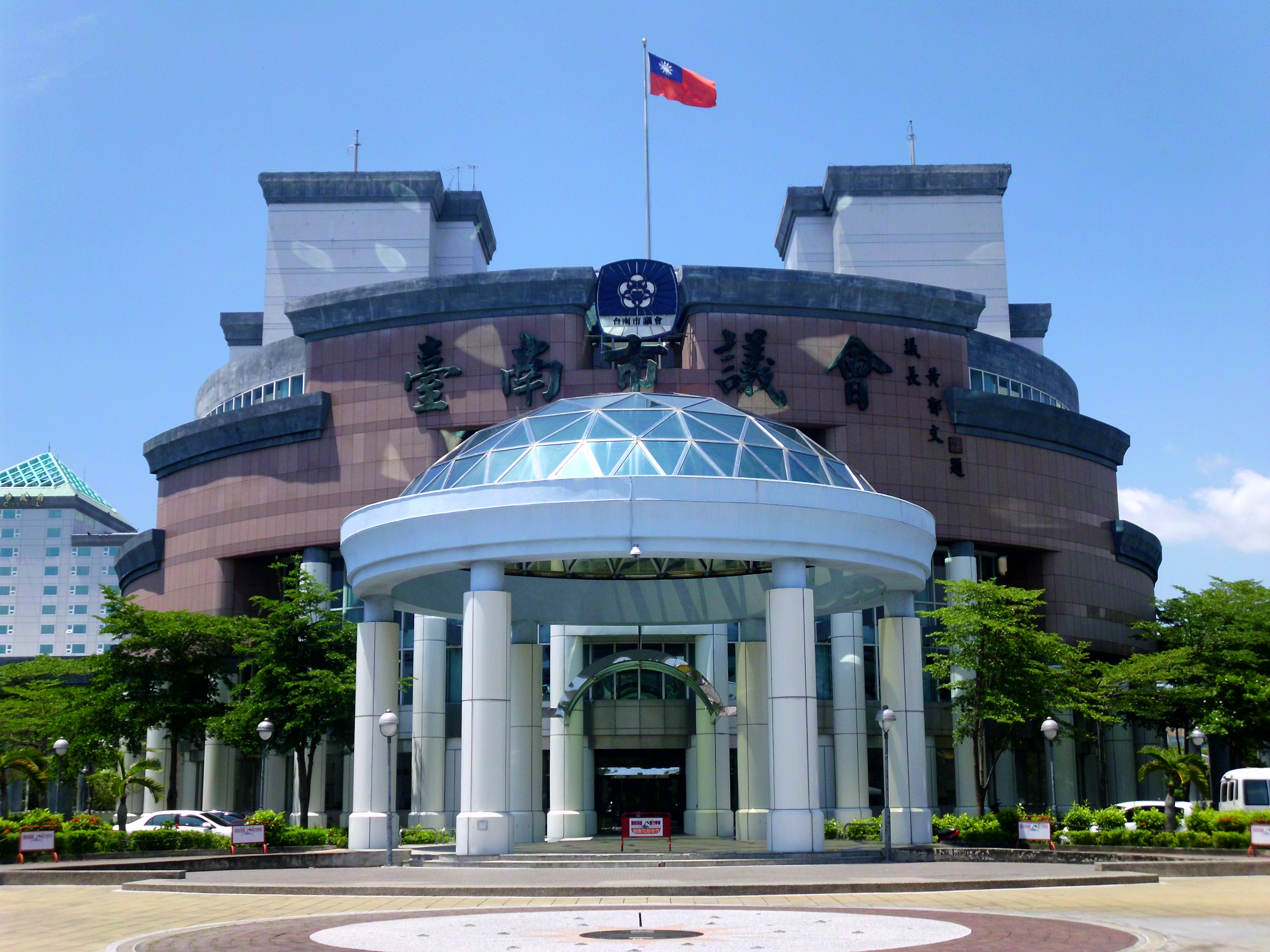
Tainan City Council

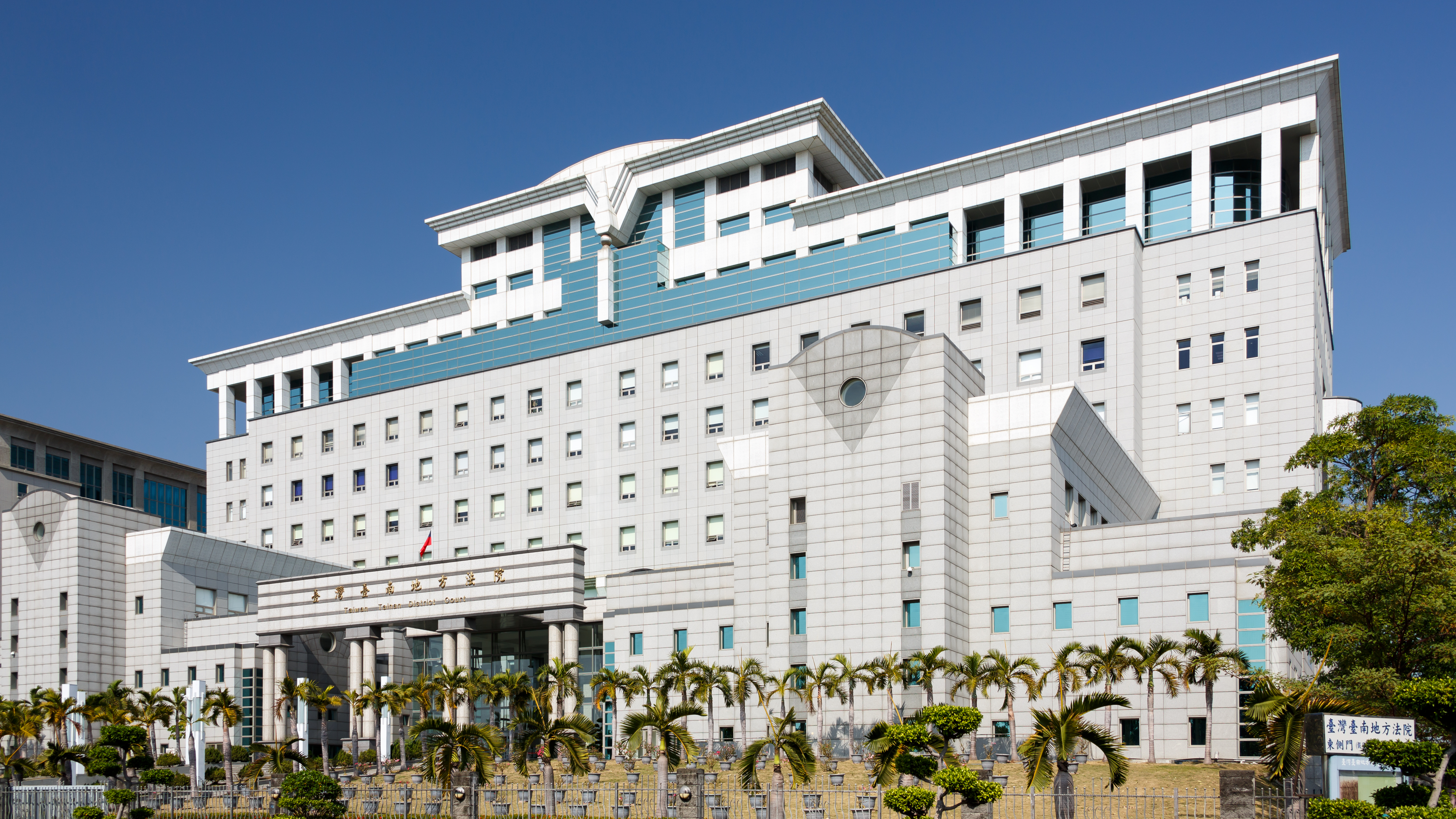
Tainan District Court

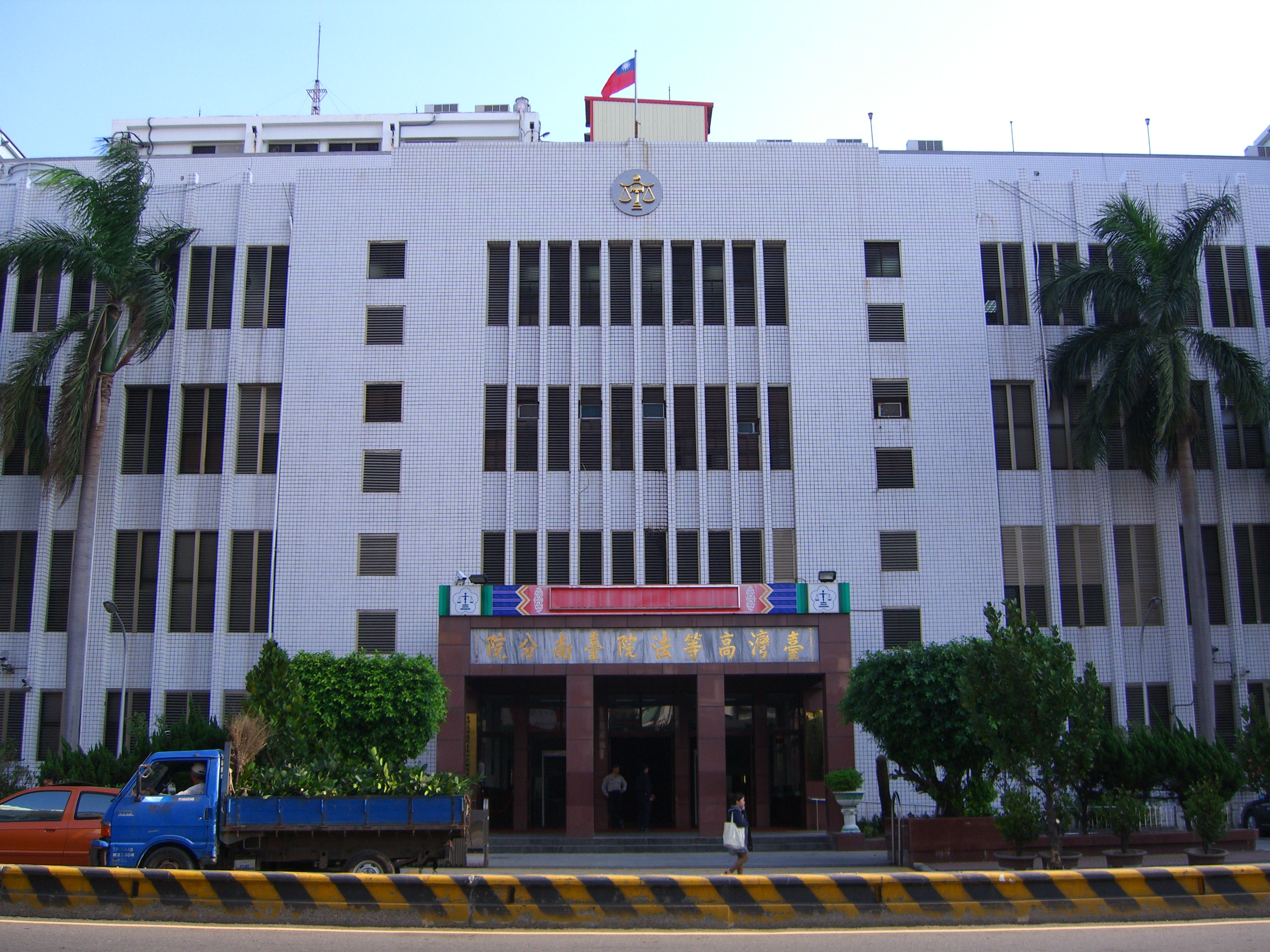
Taiwan High Court Tainan Branch Court

=== City mayor ===
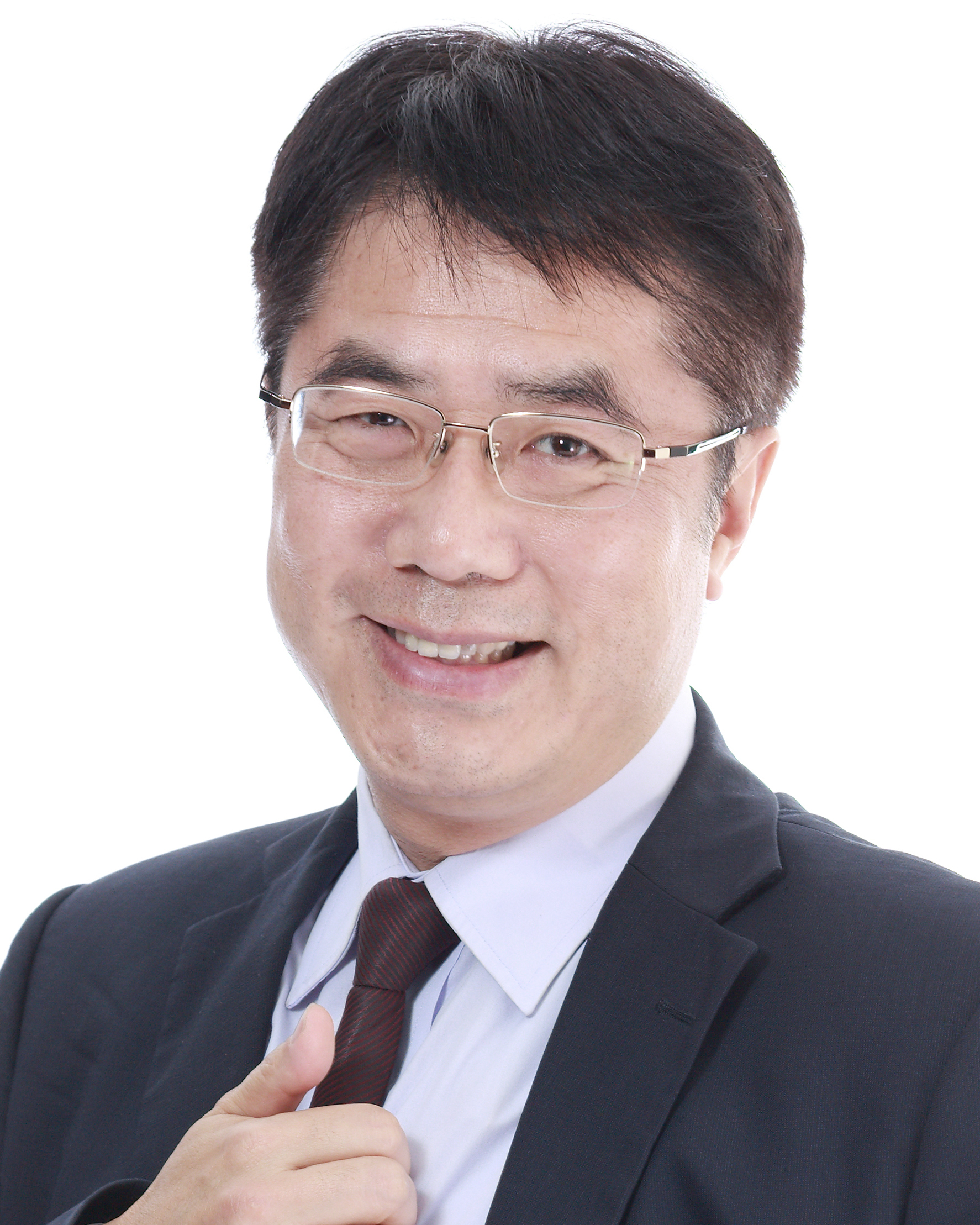
Huang Wei-cher, Mayor of Tainan.

In 2001, Hsu Tain-Tsair of the Democratic Progressive Party was elected with 43% of the vote. His closest rival was Kuomintang legislator Chen Rong-sheng, who garnered 37%. In 2005. Mayor Hsu was re-elected, polling 46% to Chen Rong-sheng's 41%. In 2010, William Lai of the DPP was elected mayor. However, after Lai's appointment as Premier of the Republic of China in September 2017, the mayor position was filled by Li Meng-yen as acting mayor.

=== Presidential elections ===
A majority of city residents have voted for the winning candidates in many presidential elections since the position was first chosen by popular vote in 1996.

==== 1996 presidential election ====
In common with every other city and county in the Republic of China, with the exception of Nantou, a majority of Tainan residents voted for eventual winner Lee Teng-hui and vice-president Lien Chan.

== Administrative districts ==
Historical population
Year	Pop.	±%
1950	827,827	—
1955	969,479	+17.1%
1960	1,124,805	+16.0%
1965	1,272,994	+13.2%
1970	1,409,698	+10.7%
1975	1,466,643	+4.0%
1980	1,546,626	+5.5%
1985	1,640,669	+6.1%
1990	1,710,234	+4.2%
1995	1,788,612	+4.6%
2000	1,842,337	+3.0%
2005	1,862,918	+1.1%
2010	1,873,794	+0.6%
2015	1,885,541	+0.6%
2020	1,874,917	−0.6%
2025	1,852,477	−1.2%
Source: 1. "改制前臺南縣31鄉鎮市人口統計資料 － 各項人口統計資料(35至99年)". 台南市: 臺南市政府民政局. July 1, 2024.; 2. "歷年人口統計資料(35年至99年11月止)" (XLS). 台南市: 臺南市政府民政局. December 24, 2013. Archived from the original on January 12, 2021.; 3. "人口統計資料-縣市人口按性別及五齡組(63)". 內政部戶政司全球資訊網 (in Chinese (Taiwan)).

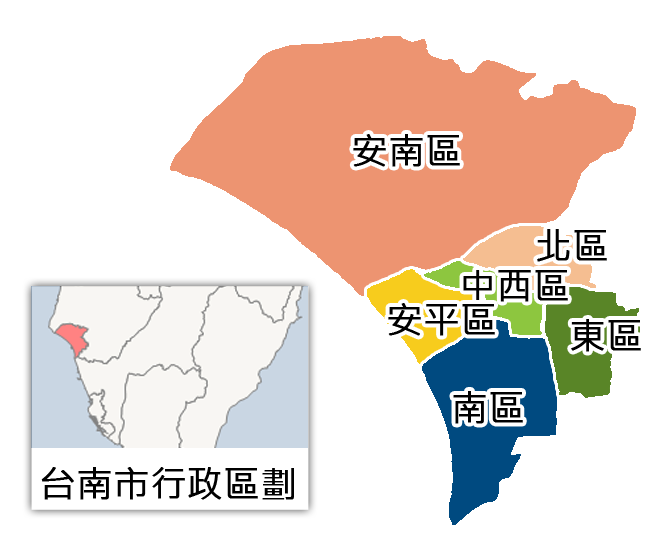
Tainan City with its districts before merger with Tainan County in 2010

Population density map of Tainan.

Tainan uses romanizations derived from Tongyong Pinyin in street and district names. Tainan has a total of 37 districts, the second most districts after Kaohsiung City.

Map of Tainan
Region	Name	Chinese	Taiwanese	Hakka	Population (January 2023)	Area (km^{2})
Inner; Tainan	West Central	中西區	Tiong-se	Chûng-sî	77,487	6.2600
Inner; Tainan	East	東區	Tang	Tûng	180,828	14.4281
Inner; Tainan	South	南區	Lâm	Nàm	121,212	27.2681
Inner; Tainan	North	北區	Pak	Pet	126,229	10.4340
Inner; Tainan	Anping	安平區	An-pêng	An-phìn	68,217	11.0663
Inner; Tainan	Annan	安南區	An-lâm	An-nàm	199,502	107.2016
River; South; Region	Yongkang	永康區	Éng-khong	Yún-không	234,351	40.275
River; South; Region	Gueiren (Guiren)	歸仁區	Kui-jîn	Kûi-yìn	68,140	55.7913
River; South; Region	Sinhua (Xinhua)	新化區	Sin-hòa	Sîn-fa	42,523	62.0579
River; South; Region	Zuojhen (Zuozhen)	左鎮區	Chó-tìn	Tsó-tsṳ́n	4,361	74.9025
River; South; Region	Yujing	玉井區	Gio̍k-chéⁿ	Ngiu̍k-tsiáng	13,121	76.366
River; South; Region	Nansi (Nanxi)	楠西區	Lâm-se	Nàm-sî	8,853	109.6316
River; South; Region	Nanhua	南化區	Lâm-hòa	Nàm-fa	8,112	171.5198
River; South; Region	Rende	仁德區	Jîn-tek	Yìn-tet	76,983	50.7664
River; South; Region	Guanmiao	關廟區	Koan-biō	Kûan-meu	33,436	53.6413
River; South; Region	Longci (Longqi)	龍崎區	Liông-kiā	Liùng-khì	3,600	64.0814
River; South; Region	Shanhua	善化區	Siān-hòa	San-fa	51,900	55.309
River; South; Region	Shanshang	山上區	San-siōng	Sân-song	6,975	27.8780
River; South; Region	Sinshih (Xinshi)	新市區	Sin-chhī	Sîn-sṳ	37,534	47.8096
River; South; Region	Anding	安定區	An-tēng	Ôn-thin	29,914	31.2700
Coastal; Tainan	Jiali	佳里區	Ka-lí	Kâ-lî	58,124	38.9422
Coastal; Tainan	Sigang (Xigang)	西港區	Sai-káng	Sî-kóng	24,716	33.7666
Coastal; Tainan	Cigu (Qigu)	七股區	Chhit-kó͘	Tshit-kú	21,471	110.1492
Coastal; Tainan	Jiangjun (Jiangjyun)	將軍區	Chiong-kun	Tsiông-kiûn	18,620	41.9796
Coastal; Tainan	Syuejia (Xuejia)	學甲區	Ha̍k-kah	Ho̍k-kap	24,747	53.9919
Coastal; Tainan	Beimen	北門區	Pak-mn̂g	Pet-mùn	10,191	44.1003
River; North; Region	Guantian	官田區	Koaⁿ-tiān	Kôn-thièn	20,866	70.7953
River; North; Region	Madou	麻豆區	Môa-tāu	Mà-theu	42,956	53.9744
River; North; Region	Xinying (Sinying)	新營區	Sin-iâⁿ	Sîn-yàng	74,972	38.5386
River; North; Region	Houbi	後壁區	Āu-piah	Heu-piak	21,865	71.2189
River; North; Region	Baihe	白河區	Pe̍h-hô	Pha̍k-hò	26,210	126.4046
River; North; Region	Dongshan	東山區	Tong-san	Tûng-sân	19,367	124.91
River; North; Region	Lioujia (Liujia)	六甲區	La̍k-kah	Liuk-kap	21,360	64.5471
River; North; Region	Xiaying (Siaying)	下營區	Ē-iâⁿ	Ha-yàng	22,649	33.5291
River; North; Region	Liouying (Liuying)	柳營區	Liú-iâⁿ	Liú-yàng	20,408	61.2929
River; North; Region	Yanshuei (Yanshui)	鹽水區	Kiâm-chúi	Yàm-súi	24,447	52.2455
River; North; Region	Danei	大內區	Tōa-lāi	Thai-nui	8,845	70.3125

- Annan District was originally the An-Shun township of Tainan County, but was merged into Tainan City in 1946. In 2004, Central District and West District were merged into the new West Central district.
View source data.

== Economy ==
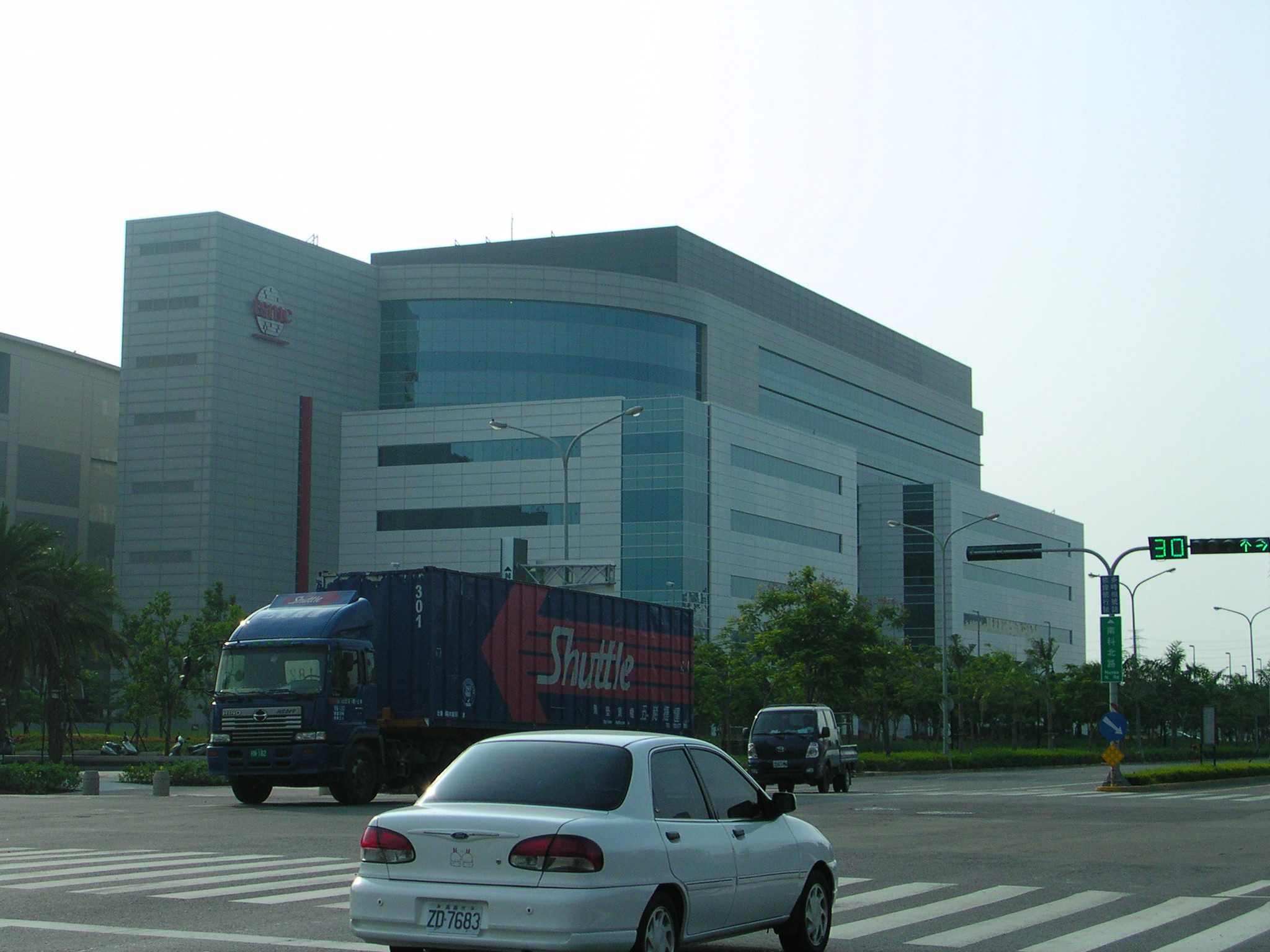
TSMC in Tainan Science Park

=== Industry ===
Once reliant on traditional manufacturing industries, the region became a major high-tech industrial hub after the establishment of Southern Taiwan Science Park in 1995. Optoelectronics, integrated circuits, green energy and biotechnology are the park's dominant industries. Prominent companies are Chimei-Innolux, United Microelectronics and TSMC. With the establishment of Tainan Technology Park, Shugu (Tree Valley) LCD Park and Yonkang Technology Park, the city became a major center for the optoelectronics industry in Taiwan with a complete supply chain.

Tainan still plays an important role in auto parts, food processing, textiles, plastics and other traditional manufacturing. Notable companies include Uni-President, Chi Mei and Tainan Spinning, which have headquarters in the city. Overall, industrial production accounted for 62.6% of the gross city product in 2010.

=== Agriculture ===
Agriculture is important to the city, especially the River North Region. While fisheries and fish farming signify the coastal districts, rice and fruit farms shaped the landscape of the inland agriculture region. The city is famous for its milkfish, oyster, rice, mango, sugar cane, pomelo (文旦), pineapple and lotus seed. A state-funded agricultural research center was established in Sinhua District to ensure the market competitiveness of the crop. The headquarters of the World Vegetable Center, an NPO that aims to improve crop quality in poorer countries, is in Shanhua District.

Once dominant industries, salt and sugar production are declining into irrelevance. Taiyen (Taiwan salt) co. and Taiwan Sugar Corp., both headquartered in Tainan, transformed to businesses in biotechnology, quality agriculture, retail and tourism.

One of the main industries in Tainan is agriculture, specifically orchid growing. A nationally founded special plantation district with R&D resources is established in Houbi District.

=== Tourism ===
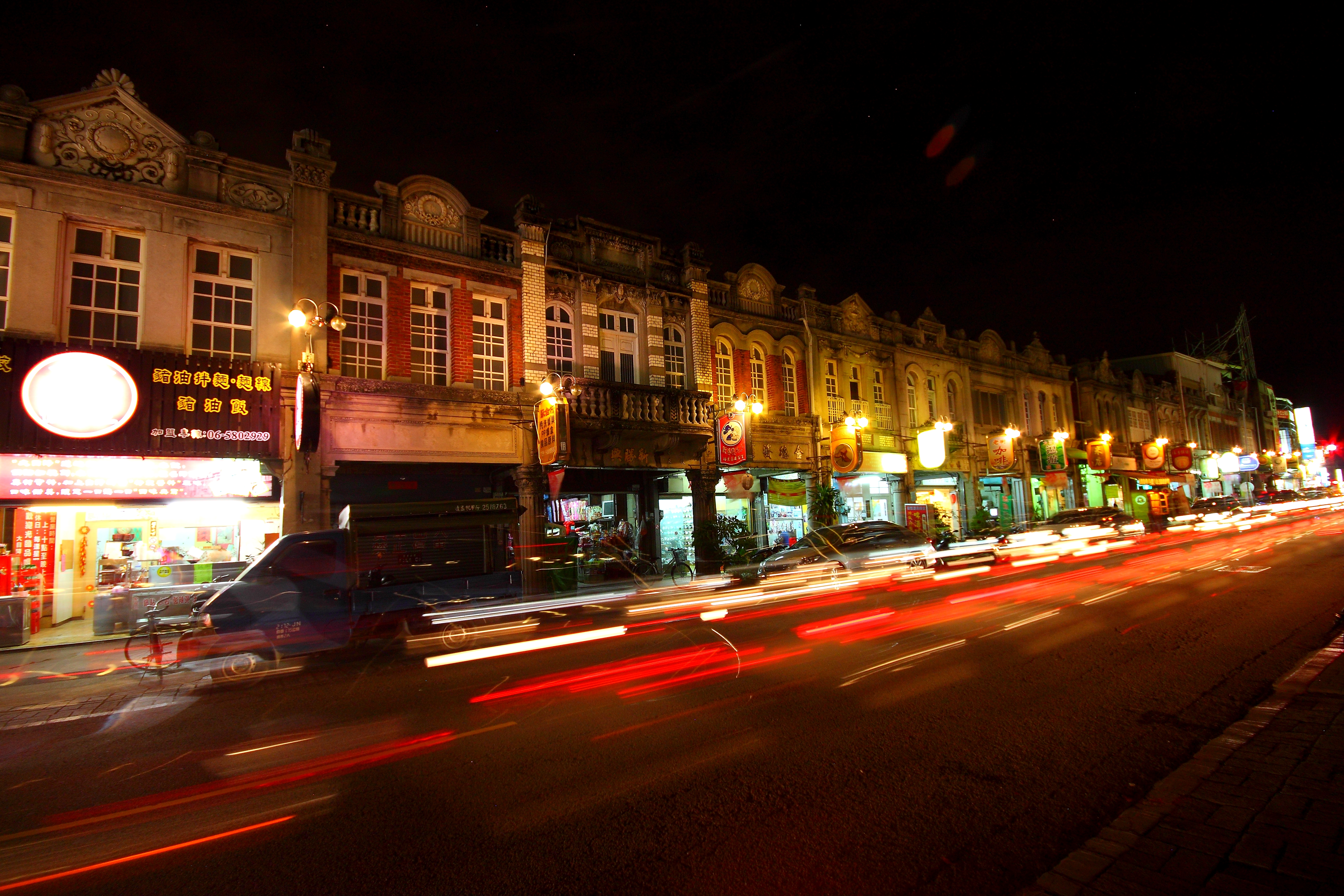
Xinhua Old Street

Tourism is an industry with increasing importance. As the first capital of Taiwan, the wealth resource of cultural heritage and its potential is under exploration. In the first half of 2013, there were over 7 million tourist visited attractions in the city. There are high-end hotels in the city, including the Shangri-la Hotel near Tainan train station. Tainan has been praised for its variety of Xiaochi.

=== Retail ===
Retail and services are the largest employment sector in Tainan, margined at 52% in 2010. The city center hosts five department stores including two Shin Kong-Mitsukoshi, two FE21s and Focus square. Apart from the city center, there are shopping precincts around the city, with the strongest presence in East, North and Yongkang districts. 'Dream Mall' is a joint development project between Uni-President Corp. and Tainan Spinning Ltd. It was the largest shopping center in the city when it opened February 12, 2015, and the precinct will host the new headquarters of Tainan Spinning and a new five-star hotel. The precinct is in the designated East Tainan second CBD near the border of the East and Yongkang districts.

== Transportation ==
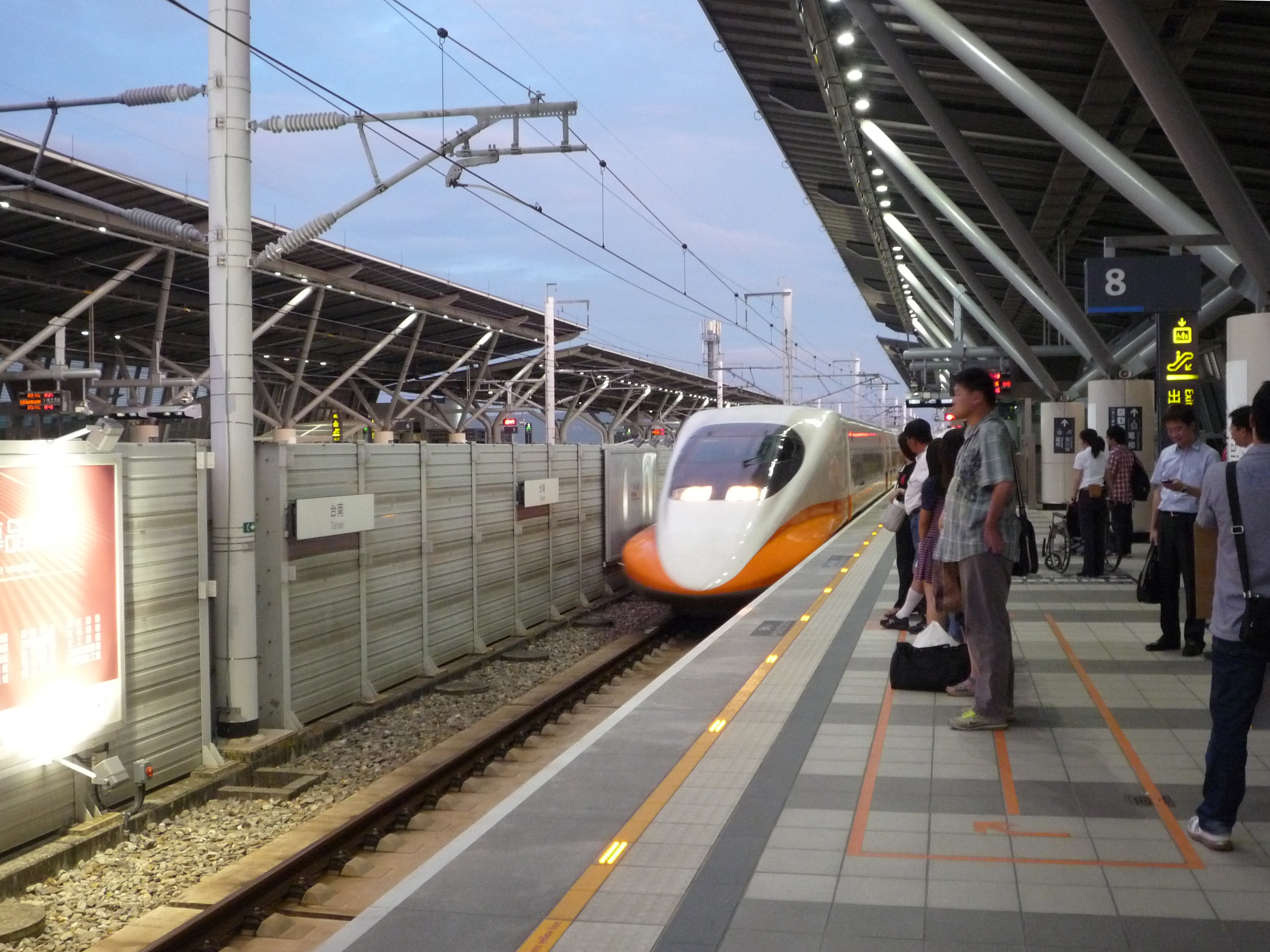
THSR Tainan Station

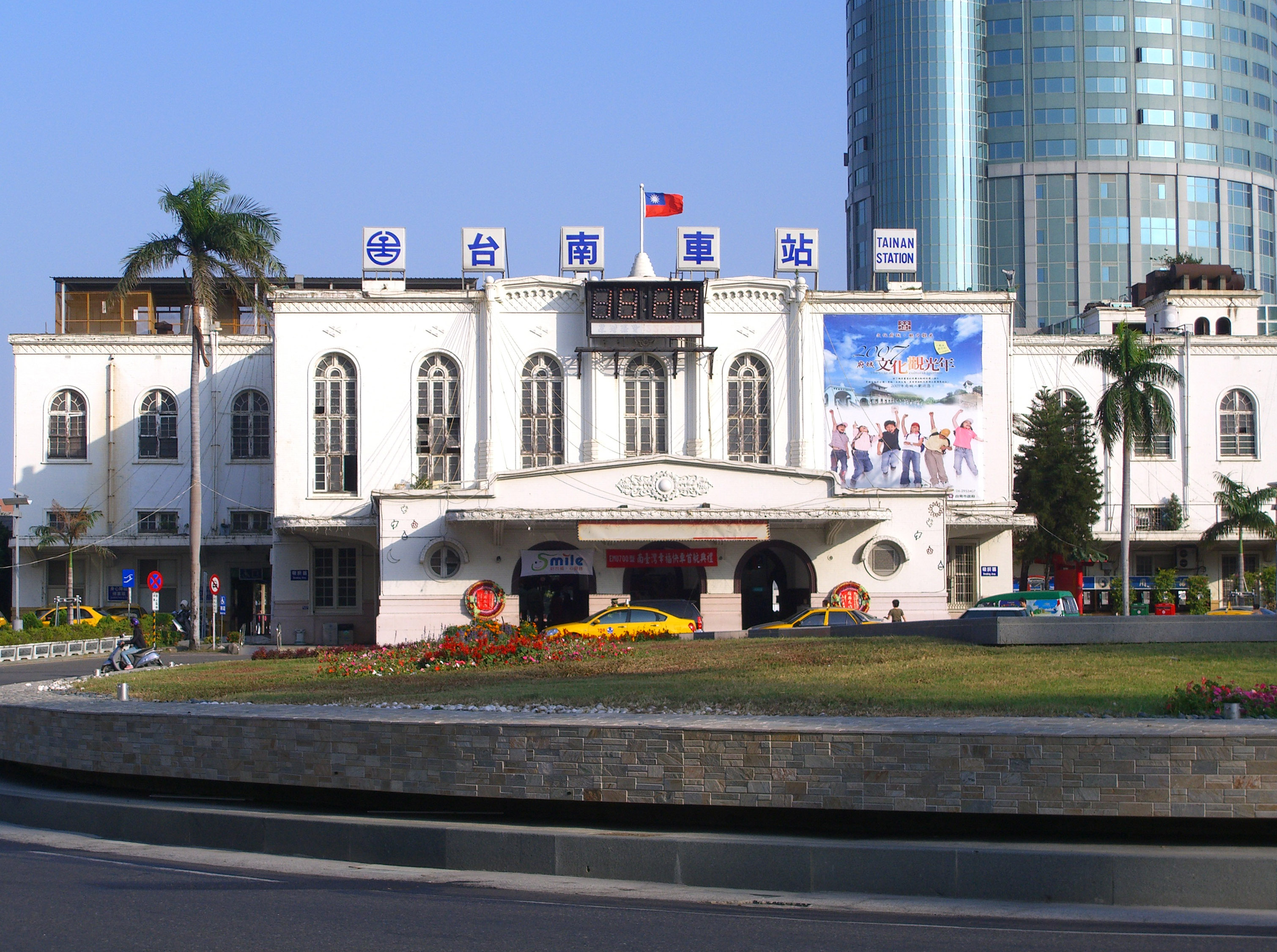
TRA Tainan train station

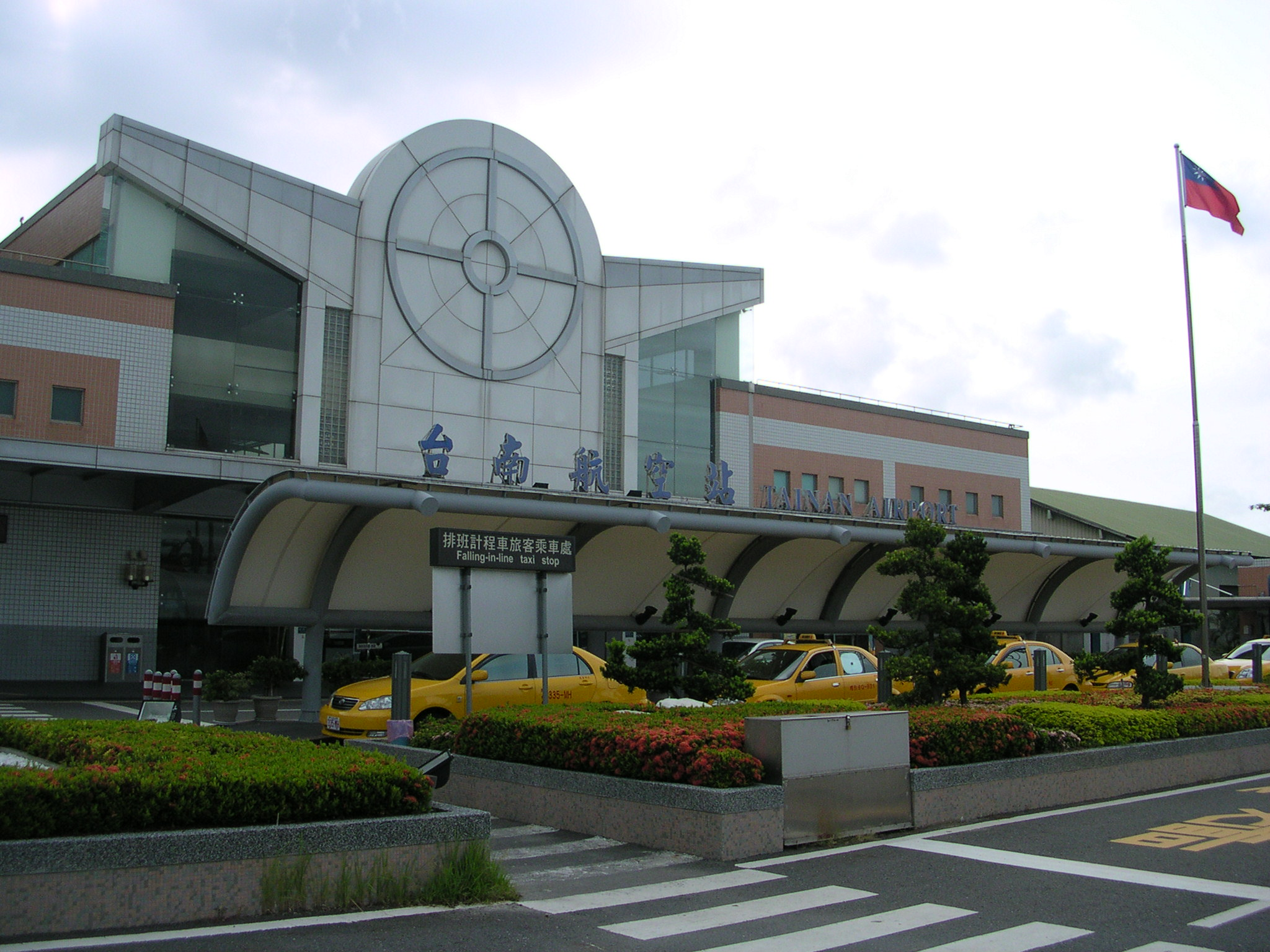
Tainan Airport

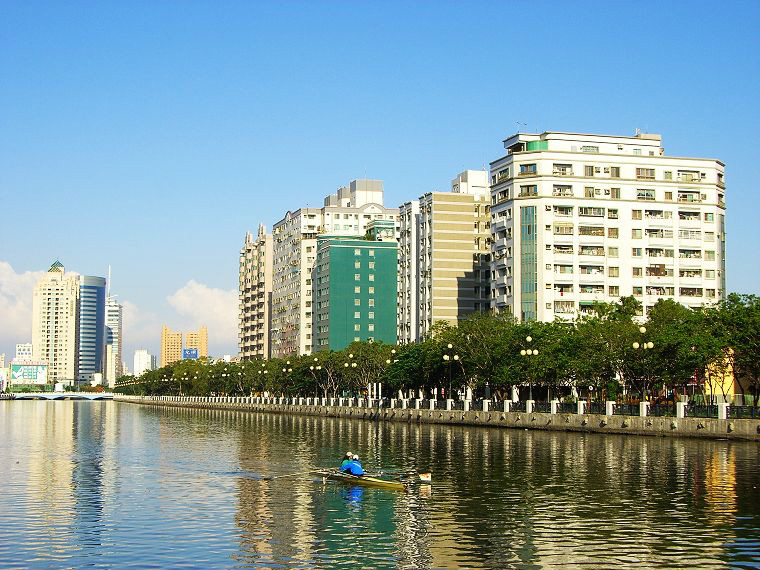
Tainan Canal, Anping

=== Metro ===
The planning for the Tainan MRT system has transitioned from early feasibility concerns to active development. The Phase 1 Blue Line, an 8.39-kilometer route featuring 10 stations located along the periphery of the urban core, was officially approved by the Executive Yuan in October 2025. This system will utilize an elevated straddle-beam monorail, the first of its kind in Taiwan. Construction is scheduled to commence in late 2026, with a target completion date of 2031.

Progress on subsequent routes varies by their development phase. The Blue Line Extension, which will connect the system to HSR Tainan Station, and the Red Line, which will link to the Kaohsiung Metro, have both entered the comprehensive planning stage. Meanwhile, the Deep Green Line (intended to link the city to the Southern Taiwan Science Park) and the Green Line (an east-west underground route traversing the city center and Anping) are currently in the feasibility study stage. The Green Line, in particular, remains in early discussions due to the significant engineering complexity of tunneling through the historic urban core.

=== Rail ===
Tainan Station is a major hub on the Taiwan Railway (TR) Western Trunk line, providing direct express services to major cities. The city is also served by the Taiwan High Speed Rail (THSR) via Tainan Station located in Gueiren District. The high-speed rail connects Tainan to Taipei in under 90 minutes and is accessible from the city center via the Shalun Line feeder rail or dedicated shuttle bus lines.

To improve urban mobility, the Tainan Urban District Railway Underground Project is currently underway. This project involves the relocation of existing tracks underground within the city center to eliminate level crossings and reduce traffic congestion. The project also includes the addition of new stations. Combined with the Shalun Line, this modernized rail corridor is designed to serve as the backbone of Tainan's metropolitan transit system.

Tainan is also known for its Taisugar railways. Historically used for transporting sugarcane and providing transportation between rural villages and local sugar refinery hubs, two tourist lines situated in the outskirts of the Sinying District remain in operation today, offering nostalgic journeys through the region's agricultural and industrial heritage.

=== Bus ===
Since 2013, the city's bus services have been integrated under the Tainan City Bus (大台南公車) brand. The network is divided into two primary categories: Daily Bus routes, which serve the metropolitan core (i.e., former Tainan City) using numerical designations, and the Main and Branch Line System, which serves the rural districts (i.e., former Tainan County). The latter utilizes a color-coded system consisting of six Main Routes (Green, Blue, Brown, Orange, Yellow, and Red) and over 100 branch lines.

=== Road ===
Neighboring National Highway Nos. 1 and 3 connect via local highways to the city itself. Tainan City has a total of 142.9 kilometers (88.8 mi) of highways, including national, local, and rural highways.

=== Air ===
Tainan Airport (TNN), located in the South District approximately 6 kilometers (3.7 mi) from the city center, serves as the primary aviation gateway for the region. As a joint-use military-civilian airport, it operates domestic services to Kinmen and Penghu, along with international scheduled flights to destinations such as Naha and Kumamoto, Japan. While the airport previously maintained a busy corridor to Taipei, these domestic trunk routes were discontinued following the commencement of the Taiwan High Speed Rail in 2007.

Beyond passenger services, the airport is a significant hub for aircraft maintenance, repair, and overhaul (MRO), hosting the headquarters and main facilities of Air Asia Company Limited (AACL), Taiwan’s first private aircraft maintenance company.

== Education ==
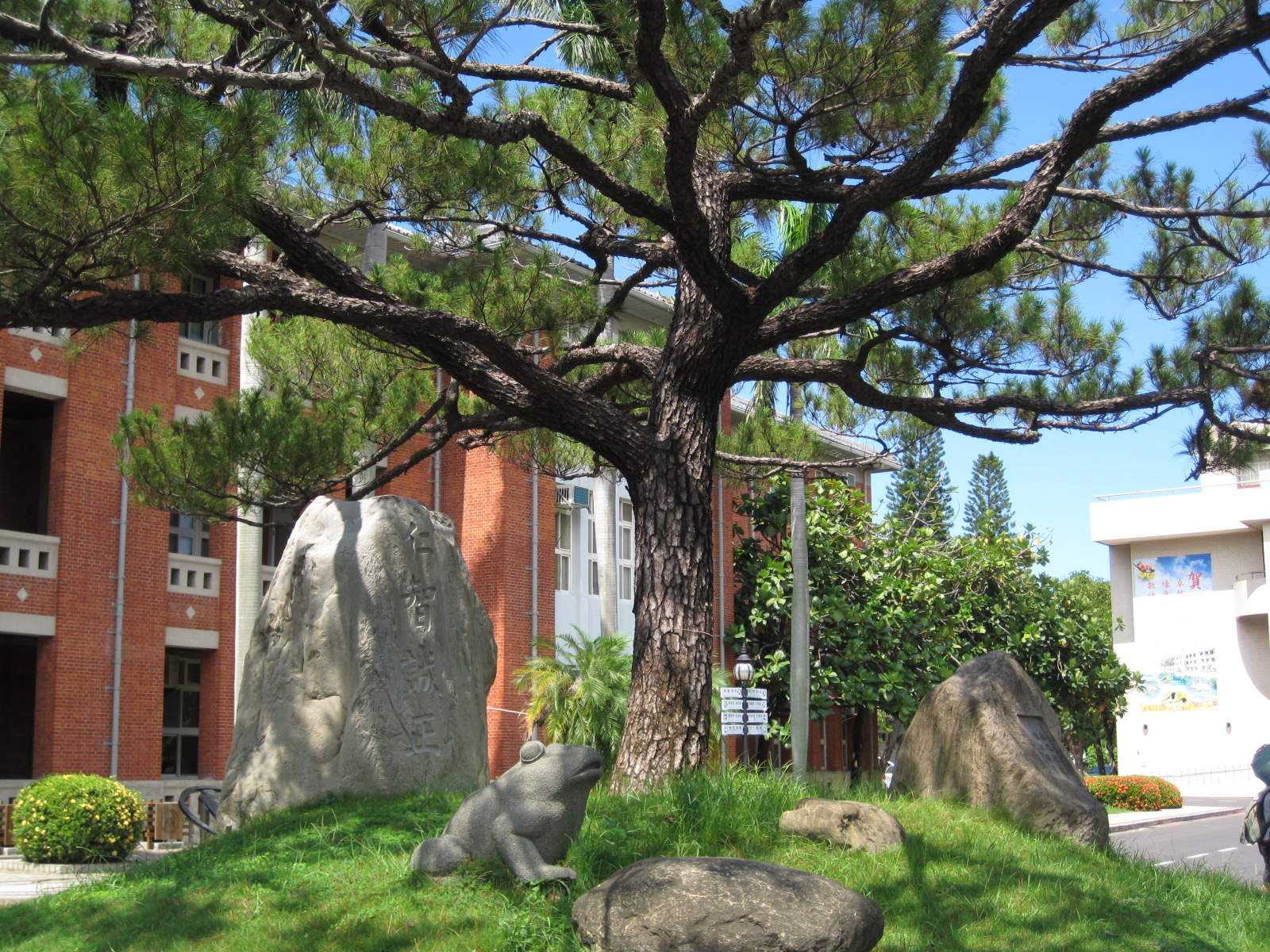
Campus of University of Tainan

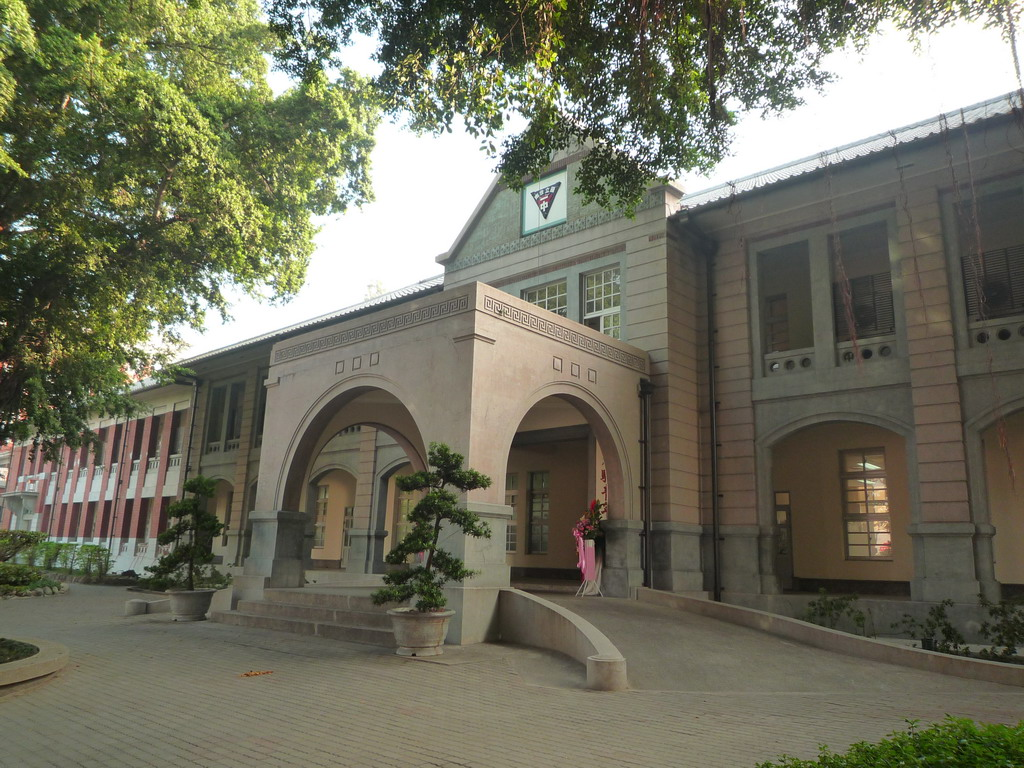
National Tainan First Senior High School

- National Cheng Kung University (國立成功大學), is famous for its engineering programs. Founded in the Japanese era in 1931 as Tainan Technical College, it has a total area of 183,000 square kilometers (71,000 sq mi). As the number of colleges expanded, it was upgraded to a provincial university in 1956, then national university in 1971. Today, National Cheng Kung University serves nearly 21,000 students through 9 colleges, 39 departments, and 49 graduate institutes. It is also ranked 2nd in Taiwan and 41st in Asia.
- National University of Tainan (國立臺南大學) NUTN used to be the Institute of Teachers' In-service Education in 1988, promoted and renamed National Tainan Teachers College in 1991. In 2004, it was established as National University of Tainan until now. The motto of NUTN includes benevolence, intelligence, sincerity and uprightness.
- Tainan National University of the Arts (國立臺南藝術大學) TNNUA exists to prepare talented individuals for careers in visual and performing arts, sound and image design, building arts, conservation arts, and art history and critique. The university emphasizes learning through individual attention and independent work creation. It is a public institution, established in 1996.
- National Yang Ming Chiao Tung University (國立陽明交通大學) NYCU Tainan campus, established in 2009.
- Tainan Theological College and Seminary (臺南神學院) was established in 1876 by Thomas Barclay.
- Chang Jung Christian University is a private university affiliated with the Presbyterian Church in Taiwan. CJCU offers masters and doctoral degree programs and aims to promote fraternity, justice and service for Taiwan. It is located south of the city, in Gueiren.
- Southern Taiwan University of Science and Technology (南臺科技大學), founded in 1969, is located near the northeastern border of Tainan City, within a 30-minute driving distance from the Tainan Airport.
- The Tainan University of Technology (臺南應用科技大學) is a private university founded in 1964. The university offers graduate degrees in music, visual art, and applied sciences.
- Aletheia University (真理大學) is a private university founded in 1882 by George Leslie Mackay. There are two branches: one in Tamsui, New Taipei City and one in Madou District, Tainan City.
- CTBC Business School (中信金融管理學院) is a private university founded in 2000 (as Hsing-Kuo University) and later rebranded CTBC Business School, when CTBC Financial Holding acquired the school. It is located in Annan District.
- Taiwan Shoufu University (台灣首府大學) is a private university established in 2000 as Diwan College of Management. Later, it was accredited and became known as Taiwan Shoufu University. There are three colleges: College of Education and Design, College of Leisure Industry, and College of Hotel Management.
- University of Kang Ning (康寧大學) is a private university established in 2011. It is located in Annan District.

=== Elementary schools ===
Public

- Yuwen Elementary School
- Fusing Elementary School

=== Junior high schools ===
Public

- Tainan Municipal Anping Junior High School
- Tainan Municipal Chenggong Junior High School
- Tainan Municipal Chongming Junior High School
- Tainan Municipal Dacheng Junior High School
- Tainan Municipal Fusing Junior High School
- Tainan Municipal Houjia Junior High School
- Tainan Municipal Jiansing Junior High School
- Tainan Municipal Jincheng Junior High School
- Tainan Municipal Jhongshan Junior High School
- Tainan Municipal Jhongsiao Junior High School
- Tainan Municipal Minde Junior High School
- Tainan Municipal Sinsing Junior High School
- Tainan Municipal Syuejia District Syuejia Junior High School
- Tainan Municipal Wunsian Junior High School
- Tainan Municipal Yanping Junior High School

=== Senior high schools ===
Public

- National Tainan First Senior High School
- National Tainan Second Senior High School
- National Tainan Girls' Senior High School
- National Hsin Hua Senior High School
- National Chia-Chi Girls' Senior High School
- National Tainan Commercial Vocational School
- National Tainan Industrial Vocational School
- The Affiliated Senior Industrial Vocational Continuing Education High School of National Cheng Kung University
- National Tainan Marine & Fishery Vocational School
- Municipal Tainan Nan-Ning Senior High School
- Municipal Tainan Tu-Cheng High School
- Tainan Municipal Nanning Senior High School

Private

- Feng-Ho Senior High School
- Chang Jung High School
- Sheng Kung Girls' High School
- Nan Ying Vocational High School of Business & Technology
- Salesian Technical School
- Chang Jung Girls' Senior High School
- Deguang Catholic High School
- Kuang Hua Girls' Senior High School
- Tainan Liuhsin Senior High School
- Kuen-Shan Senior High School
- Ying-Hai High School

== Notable natives ==
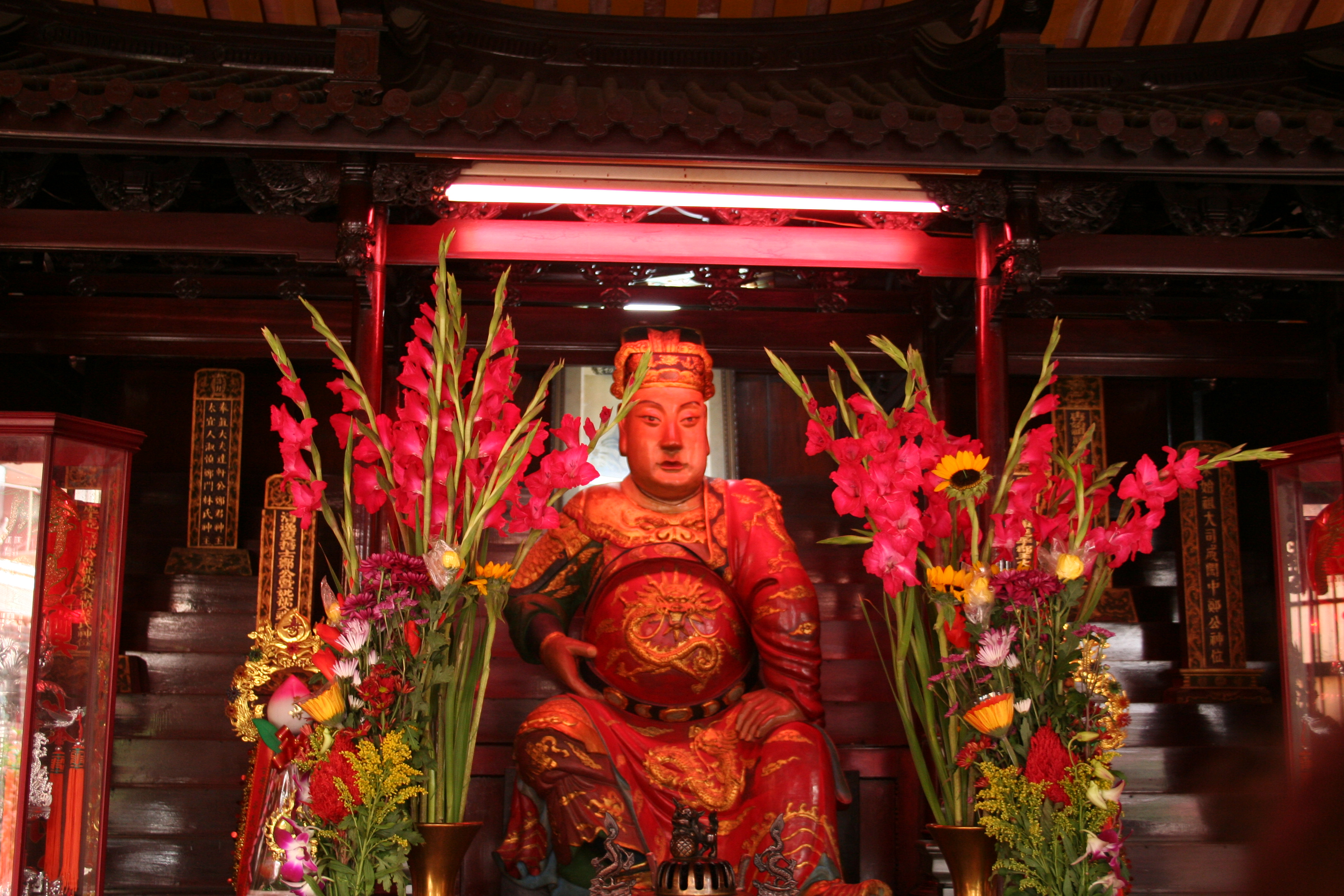
Koxinga Temple

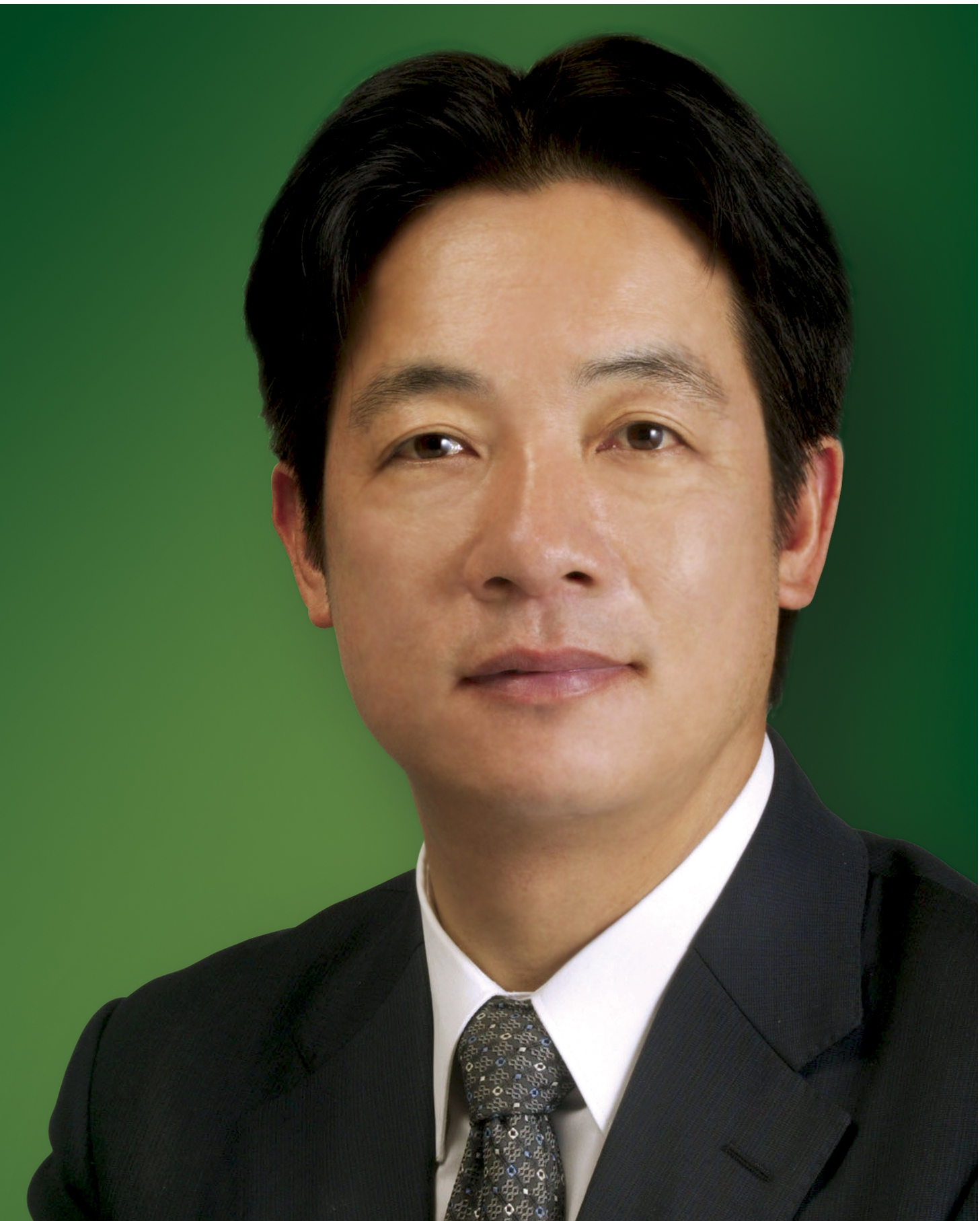
Current ROC president William Lai began his political career in Tainan.

Some famous people born, educated or prominent in Tainan, or otherwise associated with the city, include:

- Shone An (安鈞璨) (1983–2015), singer, actor and television host.
- Momofuku Ando (安藤百福) (1910–2007), founder of Nissin Foods and inventor of instant noodles.
- Thomas Barclay (1849–1935), Christian missionary, lived in the city from 1875 to 1935.
- William Campbell (1841–1921), Christian missionary, lived in the city from 1871 to 1917.
- George Chang (張燦鍙) (born 1936), politician, former mayor of Tainan (1997–2001).
- Chin-Feng Chen (陳金鋒) (born 1977), first Taiwan-born player to play Major League Baseball.
- Chen Wei-ling (陳葦綾), 2008 Olympic bronze medal-winning weightlifter.
- Mao Gao-wen (毛高文) (1936–2019), chemist, former president of National Tsinghua University (1981–1987) and Minister of Education (1987–1993).
- Hsu Shih-Hsien (許世賢) (1908–1983), first female Taiwanese PhD.
- Chin-Lung Hu (胡金龍), former MLB infielder for the New York Mets.
- Jutoupi (born 1966), recording artist.
- Kao Ching-yuen (高清愿) (1929–2016), businessman, founder and chairman of Uni-President.
- Hong-Chih Kuo (郭泓志), former MLB pitcher for the Los Angeles Dodgers.
- Tai-Yuan Kuo (郭泰源), retired pitcher for the Seibu Lions, foreign player with the most wins in Nippon Professional Baseball history.
- Chen-Yuan Lee (李鎮源) (1915–2001), pharmacologist and political activist, famous for research on snake venom.
- Chou Tzu-yu (周子瑜) (born 1999), singer, youngest member of Twice.
- Lien Heng (連橫) (1878–1936), historian, writer of The General History of Taiwan, grandfather of former presidential candidate Lien Chan.
- En-Yu Lin (林恩宇), baseball pitcher currently playing for Tohoku Rakuten Golden Eagles.
- Lin Hsin-i (林信義) (born 1946), businessman and politician, Minister of Economic Affairs (2000–2002), Vice Premier (2002–2004).
- Lin Mosei (林茂生) (1887–1947?), first Taiwanese philosophy PhD, academic, educator and calligrapher thought to have been killed following the February 28 Incident.
- Ong Iok-tek (王育德) (1924–1985), scholar and authority of the Taiwanese Hokkien dialects.
- Judy Ongg (翁倩玉) (born 1950), actress, singer, author and artist.
- Shi Wen-long (許文龍) (born 1928), businessman, founder of Chi Mei Corporation.
- Lisa Su (born 1969), chief executive officer of Advanced Micro Devices.
- Su Nan-cheng (蘇南成) (1936–2014), politician, former mayor of Tainan (1977–1985) and advisor to former Taiwanese president Chen Shui-bian.
- Robert Swinhoe (1836–1877), first British consul sent to Tainan 1861; ornithologist, writer on the natural history and zoology of Taiwan and China.
- Shen Che-Tsai (沈哲哉) (1926–2017), oil painter.
- Chien-Ming Wang (王建民), former MLB pitcher for the New York Yankees, Washington Nationals, Toronto Blue Jays, and Kansas City Royals.
- Wu Hui Ju (吳蕙如), archer and also a member of the team that won the bronze medal for Chinese Taipei in 2004 Summer Olympics in the women's team archery competition.
- Jacky Wu (吳宗憲) (born 1962), entertainer and talk-show host.
- Jensen Huang (黃仁勳) (born 1963), chief executive officer of NVIDIA.
- Ho Chuan (何傳) (1897–1989), businessman, founder of Yongfeng Yu Group (parent company of Bank SinoPac).
- Crowd Lu (盧廣仲) (born 1985), singer-songwriter, actor

== Sports ==
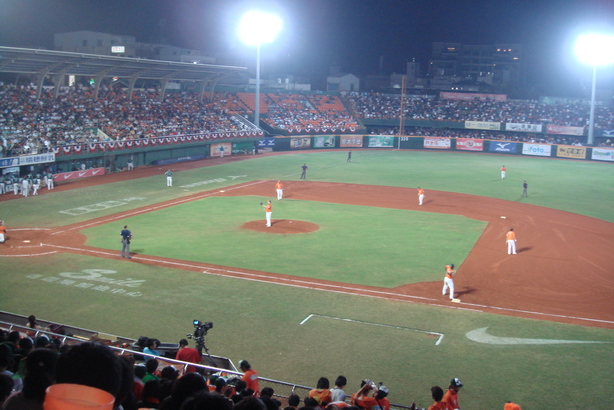
Uni-President Lions have been playing their home games at Tainan Municipal Baseball Stadium since 1999.

Tainan is home to the Uni-President Lions, who play their home games at the Tainan Municipal Baseball Stadium. It is also the birthplace of Chien-Ming Wang, Hong-Chih Kuo, Tai-Yuan Kuo, En-Yu Lin, and many other prominent Taiwanese baseball players.

Tainan also has one professional basketball team, the Tainan TSG GhostHawks of the T1 League.

Tainan is the host of the biennial U-12 Baseball World Cup since 2015, organized by the World Baseball Softball Confederation (WBSC). Other recent major sporting events held by Tainan include:

- 2004 World University Baseball Championship
- 2008 World University Archery Championships
- 2010 EAFF Women's Football Championship (Semi-final)
- 2027 Women's Baseball World Cup (Group Stage)

== Sister and friendship cities ==
The following municipalities are sister cities or friendship cities to Tainan City:

Domestic

- Kinmen County (1981)
- Penghu County (2004)

Japan

- Sendai, Miyagi Prefecture (2006)
- Nikkō, Tochigi Prefecture (2009)
- Minakami, Gunma, Gunma Prefecture (2013)
- Shiga Prefecture (2013)
- Kaga, Ishikawa, Ishikawa Prefecture (2014)
- Fujinomiya, Shizuoka, Shizuoka Prefecture (2017)
- Aomori Prefecture (2017)
- Hirosaki, Aomori Prefecture (2017)
- Yamagata, Yamagata Prefecture (2017)
- Tsuchiura, Ibaraki Prefecture (2023)
- Hirado, Nagasaki, Nagasaki Prefecture (2024)
- Naka, Ibaraki, Ibaraki Prefecture (2024)
- Furano, Hokkaido, Hokkaido Prefecture (2024)
- Mito, Ibaraki, Ibaraki Prefecture (2024)
- Honjo, Saitama, Saitama Prefecture (2025)
- Uto, Kumamoto, Kumamoto Prefecture (2025)
- Uki, Kumamoto, Kumamoto Prefecture (2025)
- Misato, Kumamoto, Kumamoto Prefecture (2025)
- Nobeoka, Miyazaki Prefecture (2025)

Asia and Oceania

- Gwangju, South Korea (1968)
- Gyeongju, North Gyeongsang Province, Korea (2024)
- Cavite City, Philippines (1980)
- Tagaytay, Philippines (1980)
- Trece Martires, Philippines (1980)
- Pasay, Philippines (1980)
- Cagayan de Oro, Philippines (2005)
- Province of Aklan, Philippines (2025)
- Gold Coast, Queensland, Australia (1982)
- Parramatta, Australia (2014)
- Ra'anana, Israel (1999)
- Keçiören, Turkey (2005)
- Wotje Atoll, Marshall Islands (2018)

America

- Monterey, California, United States (1965)
- San Jose, California United States (1977)
- Kansas City, Missouri United States (1978)
- Columbus, Ohio United States (1980)
- Orlando, Florida United States (1982)
- Fairbanks, Alaska United States (1983)
- Laredo, Texas United States (1985)
- Oklahoma City, Oklahoma, United States (1986)
- Huntsville, Alabama United States(1986)
- Carbondale, Illinois United States(1991)
- Snohomish County, Washington United States (1998)
- Arizona, United States (2013)
- Chandler, Arizona, United States (2016)
- West Covina, California, United States (2020)
- Santa Cruz de la Sierra, Bolivia (1981)
- Zacapa, Guatemala (2003)
- Basseterre, Saint Kitts and Nevis (2025)

Europe and Africa

- Nelson Mandela Bay, South Africa (1982)
- Leuven, Belgium (1993)
- Elbląg, Poland (2004)
- Esbjerg Municipality, Denmark (2005)
- Almere, Netherlands (2009)
- Styria, Austria (2015)
- Beziers City, Hérault Department, France (2023)
- Jonava, Kaunas County, Lithuania (2024)
- Łódź City, Łódź Voivodeship, Poland (2025)

== See also ==
- List of cities in Taiwan
- List of tallest buildings in Tainan
