= Legislative Yuan constituencies in Tainan City =

Tainan City
- 6 Single-member constituency for the Legislative Yuan
- District(s): Tainan
- Electorate: 2,281,338

Current constituency
- Created: 2008
- Number of members: 6

Tainan City legislative districts (Chinese: 臺南市選舉區) consist of 6 single-member constituencies, each represented by a member of the Legislative Yuan. From the 2020 election onwards, the number of Tainan's seats was increased from 5 to 6.

== Current districts ==
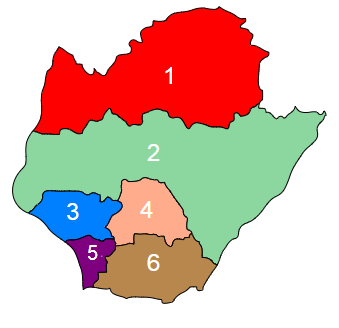
Map of Tainan legislative districts

- Tainan City Constituency 1 - Houbi, Baihe, Beimen, Syuejia, Yanshuei, Xinying, Liouying, Dongshan, Jiangjun, Xiaying, Liujia
- Tainan City Constituency 2 - Cigu, Jiali, Madou, Guantian, Shanhua, Danei, Yujing, Nansi, Sigang, Anding, Shanshang, Zuojhen, Nanhua
- Tainan City Constituency 3 - Annan, North
- Tainan City Constituency 4 - Sinshih, Yongkang, Sinhua
- Tainan City Constituency 5 - Anping, South, West Central, East (16 li)
- Tainan City Constituency 6- Rende, Gueiren, Guanmiao, Longci, East (29 li)

== Historical districts ==
=== 2008-2010 ===
- Tainan County Constituency 1 - Houbi, Baihe, Beimen, Syuejia, Yanshuei, Xinying, Liouying, Dongshan, Jiangjun, Xiaying, Liujia, Guantian
- Tainan County Constituency 2 - Cigu, Jiali, Madou, Shanhua, Danei, Yujing, Nansi, Sigang, Anding, Sinshih, Shanshang, Sinhua, Zuojhen, Nanhua
- Tainan County Constituency 3 - Yongkang, Rende, Gueiren, Guanmiao, Longci
- Tainan City Constituency 1 - Annan, North, West Central
- Tainan City Constituency 2 - Anping, East, South

=== 2010-2020 ===
- Tainan City Constituency 1 - Houbi, Baihe, Beimen, Syuejia, Yanshuei, Xinying, Liouying, Dongshan, Jiangjun, Xiaying, Liujia, Guantian
- Tainan City Constituency 2 - Cigu, Jiali, Madou, Shanhua, Danei, Yujing, Nansi, Sigang, Anding, Sinshih, Shanshang, Sinhua, Zuojhen, Nanhua
- Tainan City Constituency 3 - Annan, North, West Central
- Tainan City Constituency 4 - Anping, East, South
- Tainan City Constituency 5 - Yongkang, Rende, Gueiren, Guanmiao, Longci

== Legislators ==
Democratic Progressive Party

Election	Tainan City 1	Tainan City 2	Tainan City 3	Tainan City 4	Tainan City 5	
2008 7th	Yeh Yi-jin; Tainan County Constituency 1 (2008-2010)	Huang Wei-cher; Tainan County Constituency 2 (2008-2010) (2008-2018)^{1}	Chen Ting-fei; Tainan City Constituency 1 (2008-2010)	William Lai; Tainan County Constituency 3 (2008-2010) & (2010-2011) (2008-2010)^{2}	Lee Chun-yee; Tainan City Constituency 2 (2008-2010)	
2011 by-election	Yeh Yi-jin; Tainan County Constituency 1 (2008-2010)	Huang Wei-cher; Tainan County Constituency 2 (2008-2010) (2008-2018)^{1}	Chen Ting-fei; Tainan City Constituency 1 (2008-2010)	Hsu Tain-tsair	Lee Chun-yee; Tainan City Constituency 2 (2008-2010)	
2012 8th	Yeh Yi-jin; Tainan County Constituency 1 (2008-2010)	Huang Wei-cher; Tainan County Constituency 2 (2008-2010) (2008-2018)^{1}	Chen Ting-fei; Tainan City Constituency 1 (2008-2010)	Hsu Tain-tsair	Chen Tang-shan	
2016 9th	Yeh Yi-jin; Tainan County Constituency 1 (2008-2010)	Huang Wei-cher; Tainan County Constituency 2 (2008-2010) (2008-2018)^{1}	Chen Ting-fei; Tainan City Constituency 1 (2008-2010)	Lin Chun-hsien	Wang Ting-yu	
2019 by-election	Yeh Yi-jin; Tainan County Constituency 1 (2008-2010)	Kuo Kuo-wen	Chen Ting-fei; Tainan City Constituency 1 (2008-2010)	Lin Chun-hsien	Wang Ting-yu	
Election	Tainan City 1	Tainan City 2	Tainan City 3	Tainan City 4	Tainan City 5	Tainan City 6
2020 10th	Lai Hui-yuan	Kuo Kuo-wen	Chen Ting-fei	Lin I-chin	Lin Chun-hsien	Wang Ting-yu
2024 11th	Lai Hui-yuan	Kuo Kuo-wen	Chen Ting-fei	Lin I-chin	Lin Chun-hsien	Wang Ting-yu

Huang Wei-cher resigned in 2018 after his election as Tainan City mayor.

William Lai resigned in 2010 after his election as Tainan City mayor.
