= Dongshan District =

Dongshan District may refer to:

== Mainland China ==
- Dongshan District, Guangzhou, former divisions of Guangzhou, Guangdong; now a part of Yuexiu District
- Dongshan District, Hegang, Heilongjiang
- Dongshan District, Ürümqi, former divisions of Ürümqi, Xinjiang; now a part of Midong District
- Dongshan District, Jieyang, former divisions of Jieyang, Guangdong

== Taiwan ==
- Dongshan District, Tainan, former name was Dongshan Township of Tainan County; now is a district of Tainan City
- Dongshan District, Chiayi, former divisions of Chiayi City; now a part of East District
