= Xigang District =

Xigang District may refer to:

- Xigang District, Dalian (西岗区), Liaoning, People's Republic of China
- Sigang District (西港區), alternately Xigang, Tainan, Taiwan
