= Anding District =

Anding District may refer to:

- Anding District, Dingxi, Gansu, formerly Anding County
- Anding District, Tainan (安定區)
