= Lai Ching-te =

President of the Republic of China since 2024

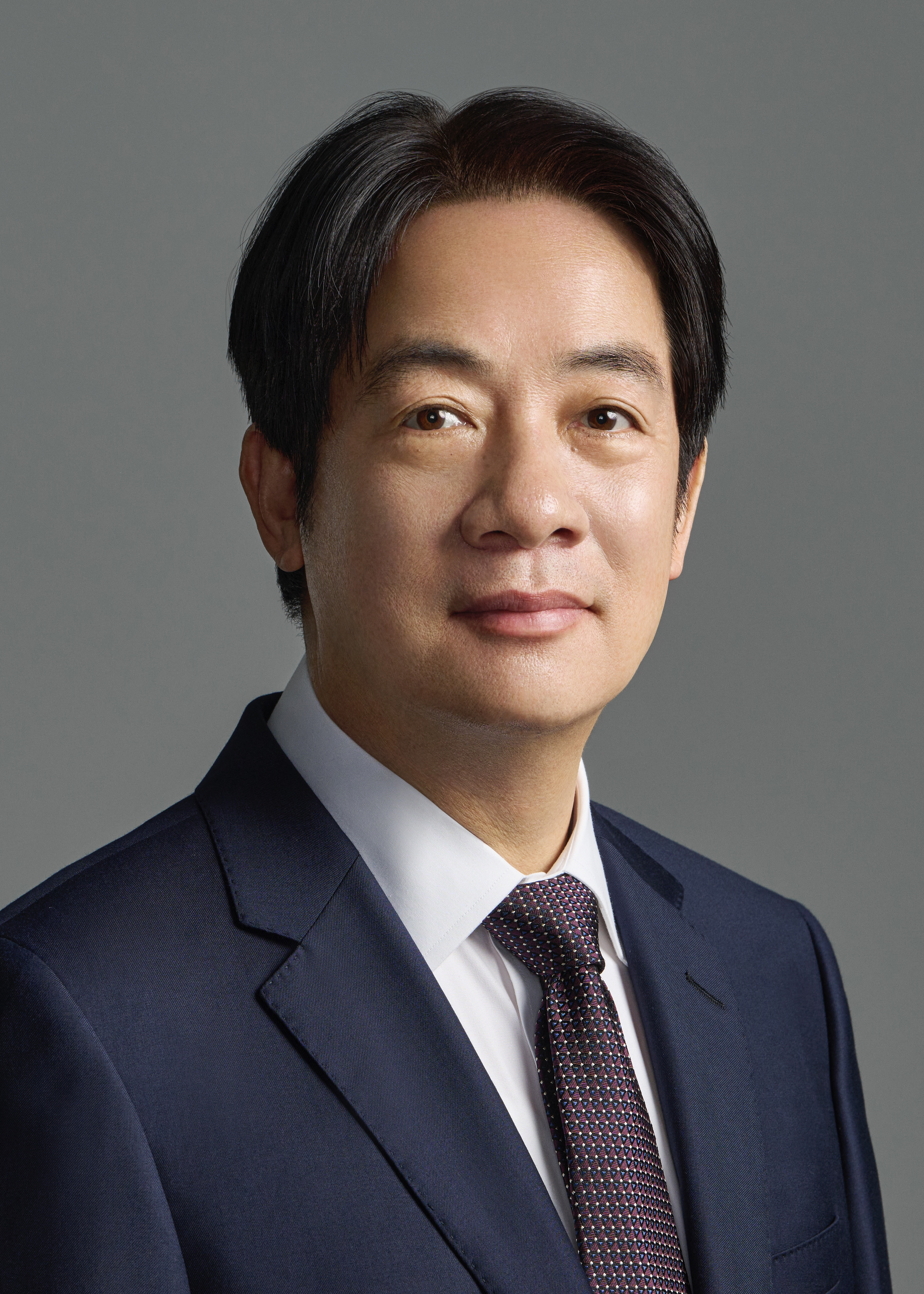
- Official portrait, 2024

8th President of the Republic of China
- Incumbent
- Assumed office 20 May 2024
- Premier: Cho Jung-tai
- Vice President: Hsiao Bi-khim
- Preceded by: Tsai Ing-wen

18th Chairman of the Democratic Progressive Party
- Incumbent
- Assumed office 18 January 2023
- Secretary General: Hsu Li-ming; Andrea Yang (acting); Lin Yu-chang; Ho Po-wen (acting); Hsu Kuo-yung
- Preceded by: Chen Chi-mai (acting)

12th Vice President of the Republic of China
- In office 20 May 2020 – 20 May 2024
- President: Tsai Ing-wen
- Preceded by: Chen Chien-jen
- Succeeded by: Hsiao Bi-khim

26th Premier of the Republic of China
- In office 8 September 2017 – 14 January 2019
- President: Tsai Ing-wen
- Vice Premier: Shih Jun-ji
- Preceded by: Lin Chuan
- Succeeded by: Su Tseng-chang

1st Mayor of Tainan
- In office 25 December 2010 – 7 September 2017
- Deputy: Hsu He-chun
- Preceded by: Position established (Note: Hsu Tain-tsair as the provincial municipalities mayor of Tainan)
- Succeeded by: Li Meng-yen (acting)
Legislative offices
Member of the Legislative Yuan
In office 1 February 2008 – 25 December 2010
Constituency	Tainan II
In office 1 February 1999 – 31 January 2008
Constituency	Tainan City
Member of the National Assembly
In office 20 May 1996 – 31 January 1999
Constituency	Tainan 1st Electoral District

Personal details
- Born: 6 October 1959 (age 67) Wanli, Taiwan
- Party: Democratic Progressive
- Spouse: Wu Mei-ju (m. 1986)
- Children: 2
- Education: National Taiwan University (BS); National Cheng Kung University (MD); Harvard University (MPH)

Military service
- Branch/service: Republic of China Army
- Years of service: 1984–1986
- Rank: Second lieutenant

Chinese name
- Traditional Chinese: 賴清德
- Simplified Chinese: 赖清德
Transcriptions
Standard Mandarin
- Hanyu Pinyin: Lài Qīngdé
- Bopomofo: ㄌㄞˋ ㄑㄧㄥ ㄉㄜˊ
- Gwoyeu Romatzyh: Lay Chingder
- Wade–Giles: Lai⁴ Chʻing¹-tê²
- Tongyong Pinyin: Lài Cing-dé
- IPA: [lâɪ tɕʰíŋ.tɤ̌]
Yue: Cantonese
- Yale Romanization: Laih Chīng-dàk
- Jyutping: Lai6 Cing1dak1
- IPA: [lɐj˨ tsʰɪŋ˥ tɐk̚˥˧]
Southern Min
- Hokkien POJ: Lōa Chheng-tek
- Tâi-lô: Luā Tshing-tik

Lai Ching-te (Chinese: 賴清德; pinyin: Lài Qīngdé; born 6 October 1959), also known as William Lai, is a Taiwanese politician, physician, and nephrologist who has served as the 8th president of the Republic of China since 2024. A member of the Democratic Progressive Party (DPP), he has been the party's chairman since 2023.

Born in Wanli District, Taipei County (now New Taipei City), Lai studied medicine at National Taiwan University and National Cheng Kung University. He graduated from Harvard University with a master's degree in public health in 2003. After practicing internal medicine as a chief physician at two hospitals, Lai won election in 1996 to represent Tainan City in the National Assembly, then served as a member of the Legislative Yuan from 1999 to 2010. He was the first mayor of Tainan from 2010 to 2017 and the 26th premier of the Republic of China from 2017 to 2019.

In the 2019 Democratic Progressive presidential primary, Lai ran unsuccessfully against incumbent Tsai Ing-wen as DPP's presidential candidate, but became her running mate as candidate for the vice president in the 2020 presidential election and won the election. Lai was nominated by the DPP to be its presidential candidate for 2024 and defeated Kuomintang (KMT) nominee Hou Yu-ih in the 2024 presidential election. He took office as president on 20 May 2024.

== Early life and education ==
Lai was born on 6 October 1959, in Wanli, a rural coastal town in northern Taipei County (now New Taipei City). He was the youngest child in a poor family of five children. His mother, Lai Tong-hao (賴童好), was the daughter of a local landlord. His father, Lai Chao-chin (賴朝金), was a poor coal miner whose parents immigrated from Gukeng, Yunlin. Their ancestral home was in Banzai, Fujian; his paternal ancestors migrated from Fujian to Taiwan during the Tongzhi era. When Lai was two years old, his father died of carbon monoxide poisoning in a mining accident. Afterwards, Lai's widowed mother raised him and his siblings as a single parent in a two-story dwelling.

Lai attended Wanli Junior High School, a new junior high in New Taipei City, and, after sitting the entrance exams twice, became its first pupil to win admission to Taipei Municipal Chien Kuo High School, the country's top senior high school for boys. After graduating from Chien Kuo in 1979, he enrolled at National Taiwan University to study veterinary medicine. Because he intended to enter medical school, he later transferred departments to study physical medicine and rehabilitation instead and graduated with a Bachelor of Science in 1984. As an undergraduate, Lai defrayed his college expenses by working as a private tutor. He also became acquainted with the works of activists Loa Ho and Chiang Wei-shui during this time.

After college, Lai enlisted in the Republic of China Army and served on an outlying island in Kinmen County, where he was the platoon leader of a medical battalion. He was recognized by general Song Hsin-lien for outstanding leadership during his service years and was honorably discharged. He then attended medical school at National Cheng Kung University, where studied under health director Lee Bo-chang. He attended classes during the day and worked part-time as a physical therapist during evenings. He received a Doctor of Medicine (M.D.) from the post-baccalaureate medical education department in 1989, specializing in internal medicine.

== Medical career ==
After graduating from medical school, Lai interned at National Cheng Kung University Hospital and became a resident physician there. He earned two specialist medical licenses: one in internal medicine and another in nephrology. His main field of study was spinal cord damage and he became a national consultant for such injuries.

From 1989 to 1994, Lai was the chief physician in nephrology at National Cheng Kung University Hospital, where he became the chairman of its board of directors. He was concurrently the chief physician at Sin-lau Hospital (新樓醫院), a hospital affiliated with the Presbyterian Church in Taiwan.

== Legislative career ==
In 1994, while still working as a chief physician, Lai became the chairman of a Tainan physicians' association which supported Chen Ding-nan's bid for the Governorship of Taiwan Province. Although the campaign was unsuccessful, Chen became a political mentor to Lai and inspired him to abandon his medical career in order to enter politics instead.

Lai left his medical practice after witnessing the Third Taiwan Strait Crisis in 1995–1996. He ran for election in 1996 and won a seat to represent Tainan City in the National Assembly. In that year's assembly election, he was the candidate who won the most votes in Tainan. As an assembly legislator, Lai campaigned to abolish the National Assembly, and led efforts to amend the constitution to freeze the Taiwan Provincial Government.

Lai joined the New Tide faction and stood as a candidate in the 1998 Legislative Yuan election, representing the Democratic Progressive Party in the second ward of Tainan City. He was successful in this election, and subsequently was reelected three times in 2001, 2004, and 2008. In total he served 11 years as a legislator, and was selected as Taiwan's "Best Legislator" four times in a row by Taipei-based NGO Citizen Congress Watch.

During his time as a legislator, Lai applied to and was admitted by Harvard University to pursue graduate studies in public health. From 2000 to 2003, he attended the Harvard School of Public Health during legislative recesses, earning his Master of Public Health (M.P.H.) in 2003. His classmates at Harvard included future Tainan mayor Huang Wei-che. During his time studying in Cambridge, Massachusetts, Lai often spectated baseball games at Fenway Stadium; after the recruitment of Chien-Ming Wang, he became a fan of the New York Yankees. In 2004, he was a visiting scholar at the U.S. Department of State.

== Mayor of Tainan (2010–2017) ==
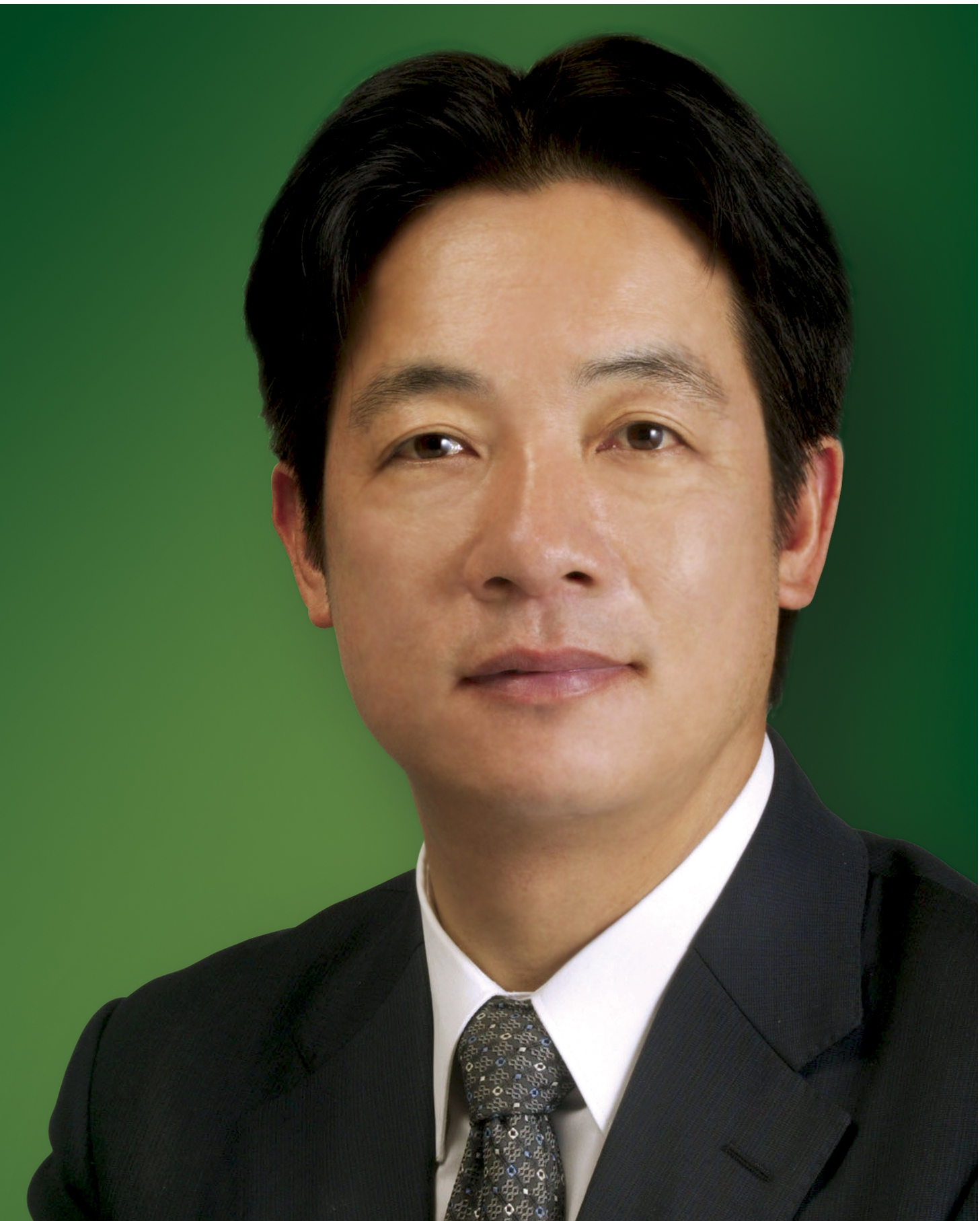
Lai as Mayor of Tainan, 2017

With the 2010 reorganization of the municipalities in Taiwan, Tainan City and Tainan County were amalgamated into a single municipality, called Tainan. After successfully being selected in the Democratic Progressive Party (DPP) primaries in January 2010, Lai stood as the DPP candidate for the mayoral election on 27 November 2010, gaining 60.41% to defeat Kuomintang candidate Kuo Tien-tsai. He took office on 25 December 2010.

Lai prioritized fiscal sustainability by implementing zero-based budgeting and abolishing the discretionary project funds for city councillors. This move, while triggering significant political friction with the Tainan City Council, ultimately helped the city reduce its overall debt and achieve a balanced budget by 2015. His infrastructure agenda focused on regional integration and disaster resilience; he consolidated fragmented transit routes into six major bus trunk lines in 2013 and implemented a ten-year flood protection standard.

As a result of his strong showing in the mayoral election, coupled with his relative youth and his leadership of the DPP heartland city of Tainan, Lai was considered a potential candidate for a presidential run in 2016. Several opinion polls ranked Lai as the most popular of the 22 city and county heads in Taiwan. During this period of high approval, Lai made a two-day visit to Shanghai in June 2014 to inaugurate an exhibition for the late Taiwanese painter Tan Ting-pho. During the trip, he met with Chinese Communist Party officials and notably spoke at Fudan University, where he stated that Taiwanese independence was a widespread consensus in Taiwan, emphasizing the importance of democratic self-determination.

Lai stood for reelection on 29 November 2014 against Huang Hsiu-shuang of the Kuomintang. Lai did not plan many campaign activities, choosing to focus on mayoral duties. He eventually won by 45 percentage points, the largest margin of victory in any of the municipal races in the 2014 local elections.

Lai's second term as mayor began amid renewed conflict between the city government and the Tainan City Council. In 2015, Mayor Lai and his administration sparked a localized constitutional crisis by boycotting the Tainan City Council for nearly eight months. Beginning in early January, Lai refused to attend council sessions to protest the election of Speaker Lee Chuan-chiao, who was then facing vote-buying allegations. This unprecedented standoff led the Control Yuan to impeach Lai on 4 August 2015, ruling that his refusal to submit to interpellation violated the Local Government Act and undermined the democratic system of checks and balances. The political deadlock coincided with Taiwan's dengue fever outbreak, which centered in Tainan and resulted in over 22,000 infections and 112 deaths in the city that year. On 28 August, amid the escalating epidemic, Lai announced that his reform efforts had achieved preliminary goals and returned to the council to deliver a report. The case was subsequently referred to the Commission on the Disciplinary Sanctions of Functionaries under the Judicial Yuan, which issued an admonition to Lai for his actions.

Lai did not complete his second term as mayor. He stepped down as Mayor in September 2017, after being appointed to the Premiership. He was succeeded in acting capacity by Lee Meng-yen.

== Premiership (2017–2019) ==
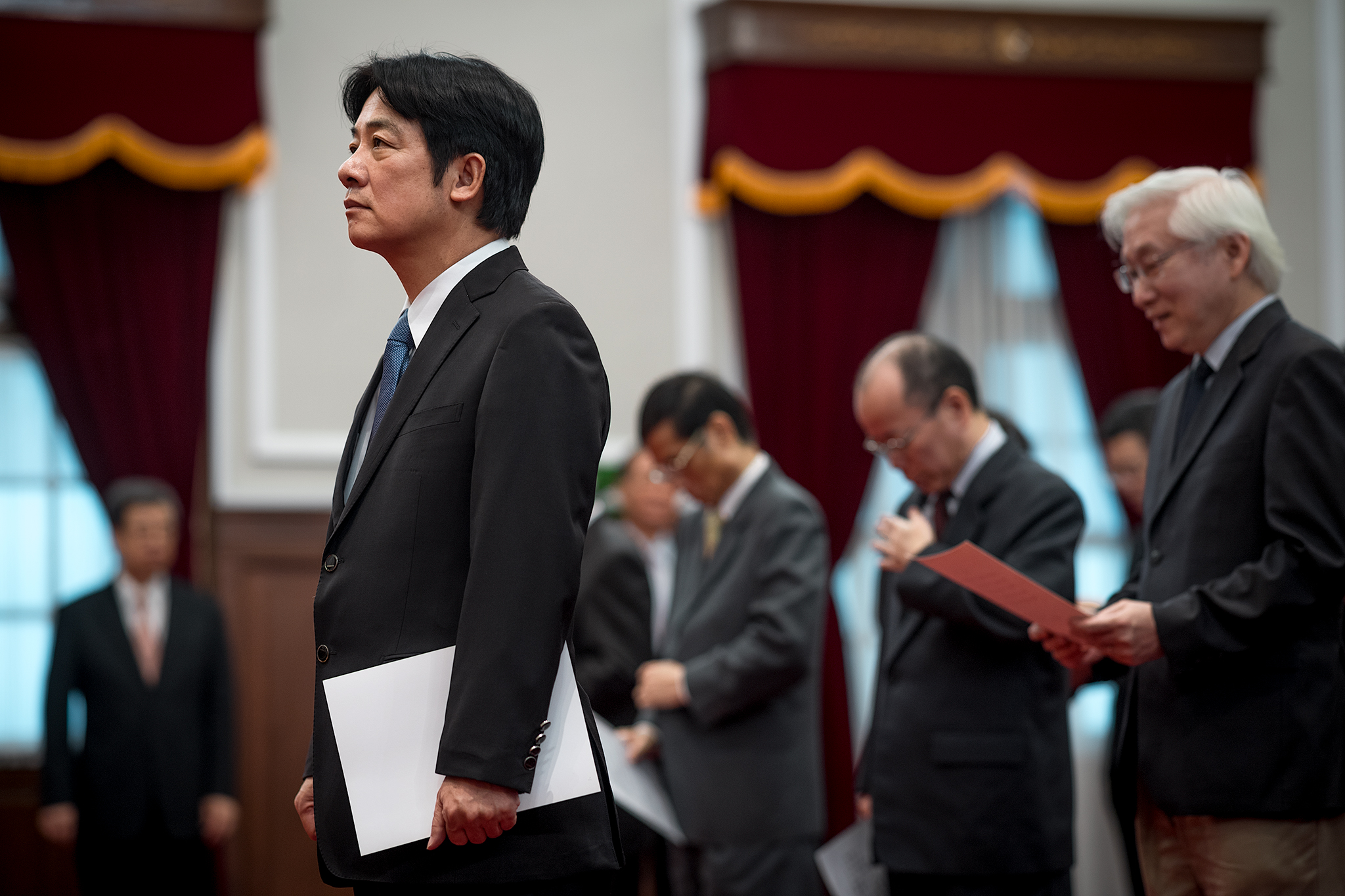
Premier Lai leads the cabinet during the swearing-in ceremony

In September 2017, Premier Lin Chuan tendered his resignation to President Tsai Ing-wen. A poll showed Lin's approval rating to be a mere 28.7%, with 6 in 10 respondents dissatisfied with the performance of his cabinet. On 5 September, President Tsai announced at a press conference that Lai would become the country's next head of the Executive Yuan.

Lai took office on 8 September as the Premier of the Republic of China. Following his appointment, Tsai's approval ratings reached 46%, rebounding by more than 16 points since August. Lai made his first appearance as premier at the Legislative Yuan on 26 September, becoming the first premier to openly advocate for Taiwan independence in the legislature. He stated that he was a political worker who advocated for Taiwan independence, but argued that Taiwan was already an independent sovereign nation called the Republic of China and therefore did not need a separate declaration of independence.

During his tenure as premier, Lai styled his cabinet as one of "practical action." To address economic bottlenecks and facilitate Taiwanese businesses returning from China amid the China–United States trade war, he launched initiatives to resolve the "five shortages"—land, water, power, talent, and labor. In the early months of his premiership, Lai enjoyed high public support; by October 2017, surveys showed his approval ratings reaching as high as 68.8%, while another poll during the same period recorded 58% satisfaction against 21% dissatisfaction.

However, this momentum shifted as his administration faced intense criticism over the second amendment to the Labor Standards Act, which was perceived as a rollback of labor rights. His public image was further strained in November 2017 by the "Merit" controversy, where his suggestion that low-paid caregivers should view their work as "performing an act of merit" led to widespread backlash among the youth and the satirical renaming of the Executive Yuan as the "Merit Yuan" by protesters. Further leadership strain was caused by his defense of the Shen'ao Power Plant expansion using "clean coal" and the National Taiwan University presidential selection dispute, the latter of which led to the successive resignations of three Ministers of Education within a single year.

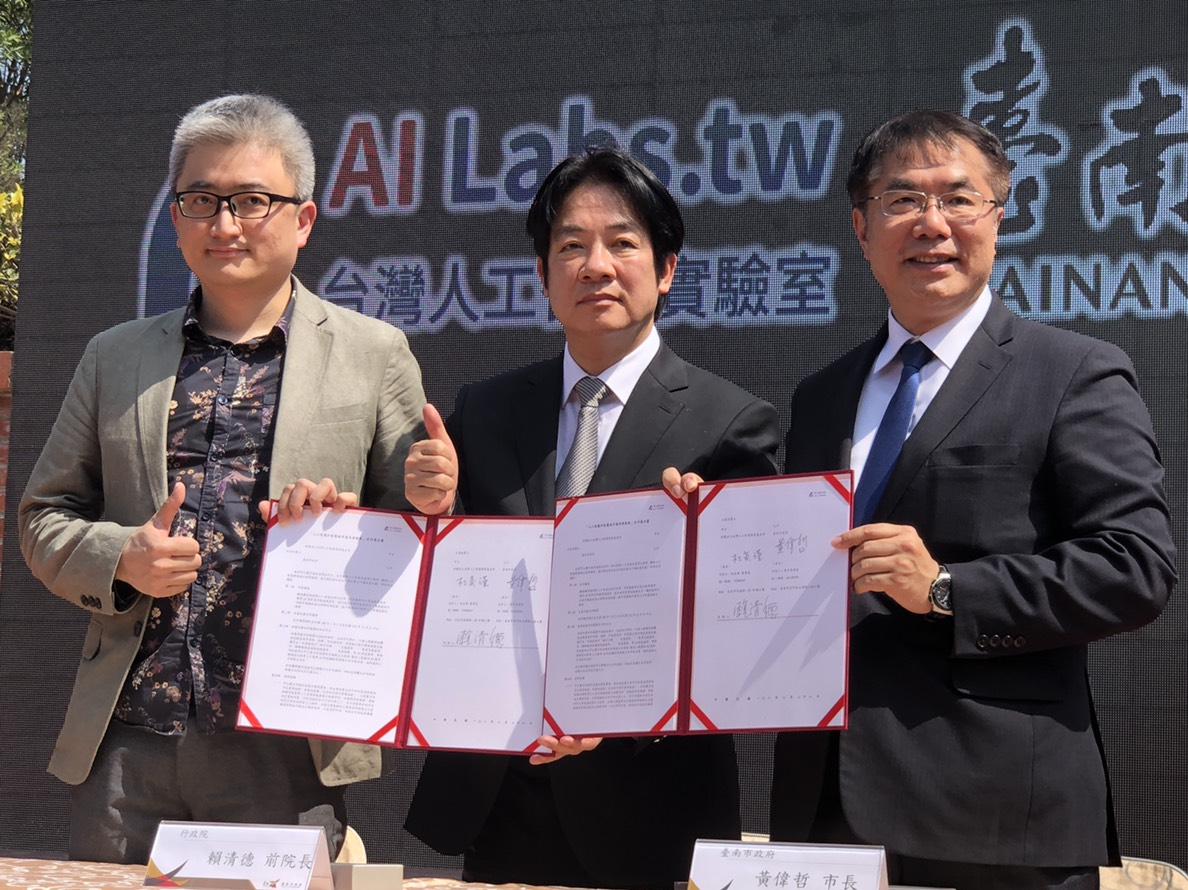
Lai (center) with Ethan Tu (left) and Huang Wei-che (right) in January 2019

These controversies were reflected in a steady decline of public support. By mid-2018, Lai's approval ratings dropped to the 40% range, with his dissatisfaction rating beginning to eclipse his satisfaction rating for the first time. By the end of the year, his approval rating further declined to a record low of 37%, while his dissatisfaction reached 49%. Following the Democratic Progressive Party's heavy defeat in the 2018 local elections—in which the party's total number of governed seats dropped from 13 to 6, including the loss of its long-held stronghold in Kaohsiung and the key municipality of Taichung—Lai tendered his resignation in November 2018. Although President Tsai Ing-wen initially requested him to stay, Lai remained in office to stabilize the government until the general budget was cleared by the Legislative Yuan. On 11 January 2019, Lai and his cabinet resigned en masse, and he was succeeded by Su Tseng-chang.

== First presidential campaign (2019) ==
Although Lai had previously expressed no intention of challenging Tsai Ing-wen in the 2020 presidential election, he registered for the Democratic Progressive Party primary on 18 March 2019. This is the first time in Taiwanese history where a serious primary challenge has been mounted against a sitting president. The results of the DPP's primary poll released on 13 June shown that Tsai defeated Lai by winning 35.67 percent of the vote over Lai's 27.48 percent, officially becoming the DPP's presidential candidate for the 2020 election.

In November 2019, Lai accepted President Tsai's offer to become her running mate for the 2020 presidential election. Tsai secured over 57% of the ballot, winning a record 8.17 million votes in the election and began her second term in 2020.

== Vice presidency (2020–2024) ==
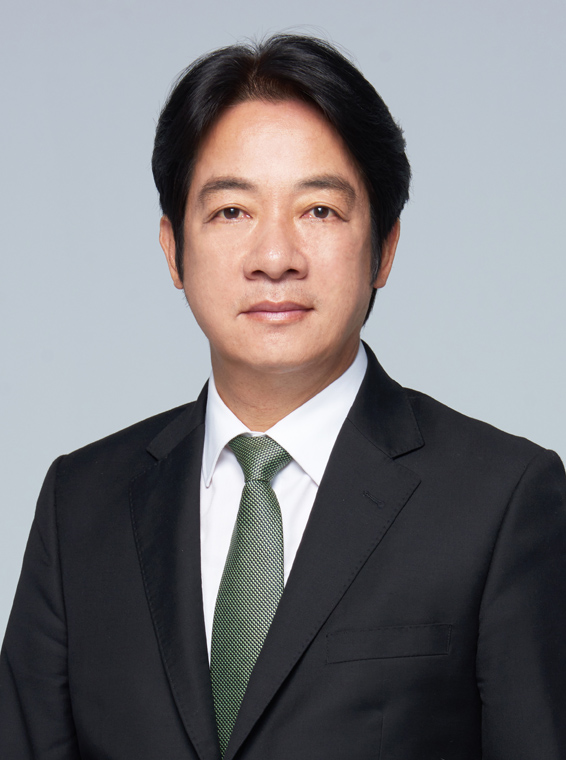
Lai's official portrait as vice president

During his vice presidency, Lai served as President Tsai Ing-wen's special envoy to Honduras for president Xiomara Castro's inauguration in January 2022. After the assassination of former Japanese prime minister Shinzo Abe, he made a private trip to Tokyo to pay his respects and became Taiwan's most senior official to visit Japan in five decades. In November 2022, Lai led representatives of Taiwan's travel agencies and industry associations to Palau to foster collaborations between the two countries.

In November 2022, President Tsai resigned as leader of DPP after the party's heavy losses in local elections. Lai officially registered as a candidate for the DPP chair election in December. Since Lai was the only candidate running, he became the new chairman of the DPP in 2023.

=== 2024 presidential campaign ===
In March 2023, Lai registered as the only person to run in the DPP's 2024 presidential primary and was officially nominated by the ruling party in April. On 21 November 2023, Lai formally registered his campaign at the Central Election Commission along with his running mate, Louise Hsiao. Lai claimed victory in a three-way race on 13 January 2024, marking the first time that a political party had won three consecutive presidential terms since direct elections were first held in 1996. However, the DPP lost its majority in the legislative election.

== Presidency (2024–present) ==
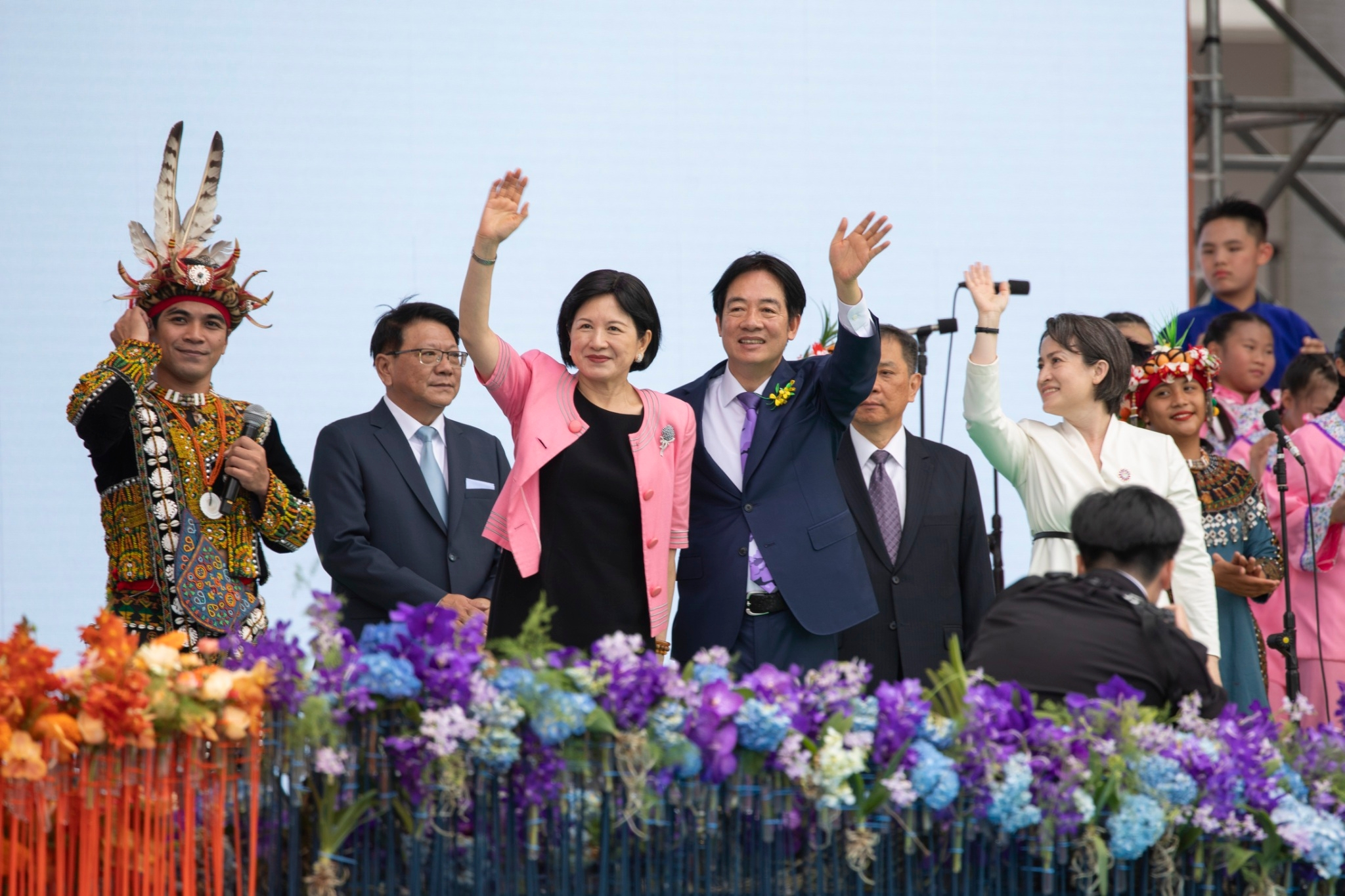
Lai at his presidential inauguration on 20 May 2024

On 13 January 2024, Lai Ching-te was elected president of the Republic of China with approximately 40% of the vote, and was inaugurated on 20 May 2024. Lai appointed Cho Jung-tai, ruling party's former chairman, as the new premier. In the parliamentary election his party DPP secured 51 seats while the two opposition parties KMT and TPP won 52 and 8 respectively, resulting in a minority government.

=== Internal affairs ===
In May 2024, the KMT-TPP coalition passed parliamentary bills strengthening parliamentary power in investigation and review, sparking strong opposition from the DPP and massive protests by DPP supporters. Lai subsequently filed a constitutional challenge which the court later upheld in June, declaring the bills unconstitutional.

In September, Ko Wen-je the leader of the TPP was arrested and investigated for bribery allegations, which was claimed as political persecution by TPP and divided public opinion in Taiwan. Huang Kuo-chang then became the new TPP leader and continued to strengthen collaboration with the KMT, including the revisions to the Constitutional Interpretation Act, the Election and Recall Act and the Budget Act, further restricting government power. Following the expiration of seven justices' terms in late 2024, the Constitutional Court entered a period of functional paralysis after the Legislative Yuan rejected President Lai's new nominees.

In early to mid-2025, the DPP, led by Lai, supported the 2025 Taiwanese mass electoral recall campaigns, which eventually failed to recall any opposition party legislators, despite initial optimism among DPP supporters. Lai's disapproval rating began to surpass his approval rating.

His government also banned Taiwanese people from using the Chinese social media app Rednote, which was used by 29% of the population, due to a fraud risk, leading to disapproval over the ban.

On 26 November, Lai Ching-te and his defense minister, Wellington Koo, announced a new special budget for Taiwan to purchase weapons from the United States, which over the next several years will reach T$1.25 trillion (US$39.89 billion).

In December, Premier Cho started selectively refusing to enforce laws passed by the Legislative Yuan, while Lai accused the opposition parties of abusing legislative power akin to a "dictatorship". Previously, opposition parties passed many controversial bills, some of which paralysed Taiwan's Constitutional Court and caused the constitutional crisis.

=== Impeachment attempts ===
Lai refused to promulgate a legal amendment that would have allowed local governments to receive a larger share of government revenues, arguing that the legislation would hurt Taiwan's fiscal sustainability. Premier Cho had also declined to countersign the legislation on 15 December, which Lai cited as a reason not to approve the law. This was unprecedented in the constitutional history of Taiwan and was strongly criticised by the opposition Kuomintang (KMT) and Taiwan People's Party (TPP). Those parties compared Lai to Yuan Shikai, a historical figure associated with autocratic rule, and subsequently began impeachment proceedings against him in the Legislative Yuan.

A motion to initiate the impeachment process passed on 26 December, with all KMT and TPP members voting in support and all DPP members voting against. The Legislative Yuan hosted two impeachment inquiries, in January and May 2026; Lai did not attend either session. On 19 May, the Legislative Yuan voted 56 to 50 in favor of impeachment, but this did not reach the two-thirds supermajority required to do so.

=== Foreign relations ===
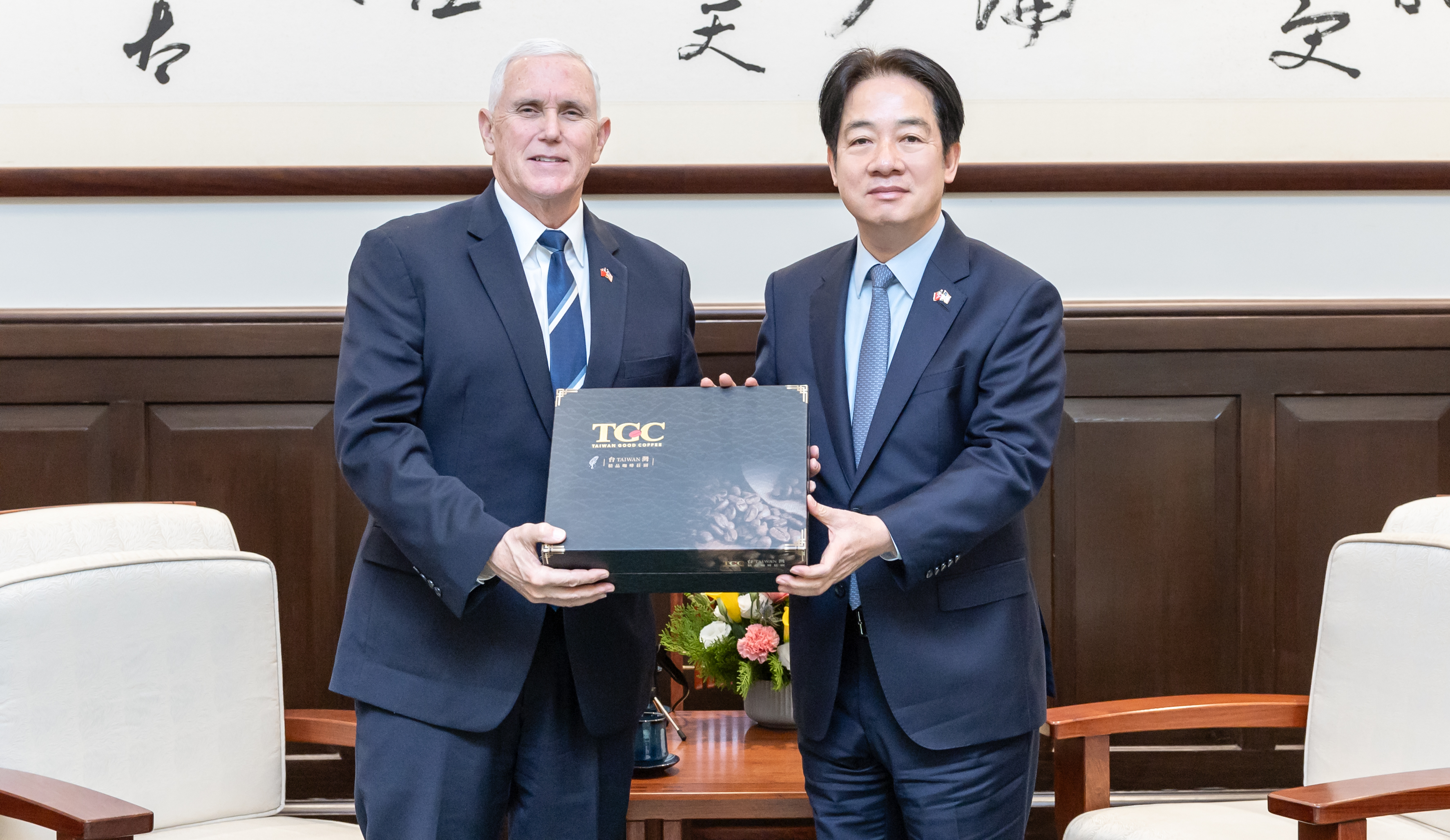
Lai with former U.S. Vice President Mike Pence on 17 January 2025

Under Lai, Taiwan continued the previous administration's New Southbound Policy, signing an investment pact with Thailand in June 2024. Thailand became the fifth trading partner to sign an investment agreement with Taiwan since the announcement of the policy in 2016. Facing the Trump administration's imposition of tariffs on Taiwan under the banner of "reciprocal tariffs," Lai announced plans to increase procurement from and investment in the United States, in addition to eliminating trade barriers.

Lai stated that the ROC and the PRC are not subordinate to each other. He reaffirmed the island's commitment to resisting PRC's annexation, emphasizing its sovereignty during National Day celebrations. He also expressed hopes for dialogue with Beijing, despite ongoing military pressure and tensions. In 2025, Lai announced plans to reinstate military trials for active-duty personnel and labeled the PRC a "foreign hostile force" under the Anti-Infiltration Act.

== Political views ==
Previously, Lai was viewed as a "deep green" member of the DPP who advocated for Taiwanese independence. However, he has since moderated his position. In 2017, Lai described his stance as "having an affinity to China while loving Taiwan," and referred to himself as a "pragmatic worker for Taiwanese independence." He argued that there is no need to declare independence because Taiwan is already a sovereign, independent country called the Republic of China. Lai maintains that the Republic of China, founded in 1912, has been reborn as a new nation on Taiwan. He further explained that the term "Taiwan independence" actually means that Taiwan does not belong to the People's Republic of China, and that the ROC and the PRC are not subordinate to each other.

Lai treats "Republic of China," "Taiwan," and "Republic of China Taiwan" as interchangeable names for the nation. He believes that retaining the name "Republic of China" helps foster unity within Taiwanese society because the name is enshrined in the constitution. Whether one identifies with "Taiwan" or the "Republic of China," he argues that both refer to the people of Taiwan, Penghu, Kinmen, and Matsu. However, when referring to representative sports teams, Lai pointedly uses the English phrase "Team Taiwan" to emphasize the "Taiwan" designation.

Lai has been a vocal critic of the Republic of China (ROC) Constitution. He stated that the document was originally drafted for China rather than being tailor-made for Taiwan. Lai has asserted that the representatives who drafted the original ROC Constitution were not chosen through a popular vote by the people of Taiwan; he maintains that it was not until the seven subsequent constitutional amendments that the Taiwanese people became the primary subjects of the constitutional framework. He noted that despite these amendments, systemic issues persist. Furthermore, he argued that the tension between "Great China" ideologies and the consciousness of Taiwan as a "community of common destiny" continues to impact national unity. He rejects interpreting the ROC Constitution through a "One China" framework that links Taiwan and mainland China, questioning whether it can truly serve as a guardian for cross-strait relations. He specifically sparked controversy by asking whether treating the ROC Constitution as a safeguard would, in fact, bring disaster to Taiwan.

Lai has rejected the 1992 Consensus and maintains that the ROC and the PRC are not subordinate to each other. In September 2024, Lai challenged the PRC's justification for its claims over Taiwan, arguing that if "territorial integrity" were Beijing's primary concern, it would also seek to reclaim territories ceded to Russia under the 19th-century Treaty of Aigun. Lai asserted that the PRC's true objective is not territorial but strategic, aimed at overturning the rules-based international order and establishing hegemony in the West Pacific. At a 2024 National Day event, he introduced what media termed the "Motherland Theory," arguing that because the ROC was founded in 1912 and the PRC in 1949, the PRC cannot logically be the motherland of the older ROC's citizens. In 2025, he labeled the PRC a "foreign hostile force," claiming that a real advocate of the ROC must oppose the Chinese Communist Party, while a real advocate of Taiwan must safeguard Taiwan.

Lai advocates strengthening Taiwan's relations with the United States and other liberal democracies, seeking to construct a "democratic umbrella" and establish democratic industrial supply chains. Lai opposed the rhetoric of "America skepticism," stating that allowing ill-intentioned individuals to deliberately spark skepticism toward the U.S. and turn it into a social consensus would be extremely detrimental to Taiwan.

== Personal life ==
Lai married Wu Mei-ju in 1986. Wu worked for Taipower, and was based in Tainan until Lai was elected mayor of the city, and she transferred to Kaohsiung. The couple raised two sons.

Lai's first grandson was born in the United States in 2020.

In September 2026, Lai's son Lai Ting-yu was allegedly surveilled in the Seattle area by Zhang Wanying, who U.S. authorities accused of acting as an unregistered agent of the Chinese government.

== Honors ==
- Taiwan:
  - Order of Dr. Sun Yat-sen with Grand Cordon (As president)
  - Order of Propitious Clouds with Special Grand Cordon (As President)
  - Grand Cordon of the Order of Brilliant Jade (As President)

== See also ==
- List of current heads of state and government
- List of heads of the executive by approval rating

== Notes ==
Political offices
Preceded by Hsu Tain-tsair	Mayor of Tainan; 2010–2017	Succeeded by Lee Meng-yen; Acting
Preceded by Lin Chuan	Premier of the Republic of China; 2017–2019	Succeeded by Su Tseng-chang
Preceded by Chen Chien-jen	Vice President of the Republic of China; 2020–2024	Succeeded by Hsiao Bi-khim
Preceded by Tsai Ing-wen	President of the Republic of China; 2024–present	Incumbent
Party political offices
Preceded by Chen Chien-jen	DPP nominee for Vice President of the Republic of China; 2020	Succeeded by Hsiao Bi-khim
Preceded by Chen Chi-mai	Chairman of the Democratic Progressive Party; 2023–present	Incumbent
Preceded by Tsai Ing-wen	DPP nominee for President of the Republic of China; 2024	Most recent
