= District (Taiwan) =

Third-level division of Taiwan

- Category: Townships/cities and districts
- Location: Taiwan Area
- Found in: Special municipality, city
- Created by: Local government act
- Created: 25 October 1945; 25 January 1999
- Number: 170 (as of 2019)
- Government: None (Note: Mountain indigenous districts have self-governing bodies consisting of a district office and a representative council; there are currently six such districts.)
- Subdivisions: Village

Districts are administrative subdivisions of Taiwan's special municipalities of the second level and provincial cities of the third level formerly under its provinces. There are two types of district in the administrative scheme:

Name	Chinese	Mandarin Pinyin	Taiwanese Pe̍h-ōe-jī
District	區	qū	khu
Mountain indigenous district	直轄市山地原住民區	zhíxiáshì shāndì yuánzhùmín qū	Ti̍t-hat-chhī soaⁿ-tē goân-chū-bîn khu

Ordinary districts are governed directly by the municipality/city government, with district administrators appointed by mayors to four-year terms. The mountain indigenous district is a local government body with elected district chiefs as well as district council serving four-year terms.

== History ==
The first administrative divisions entitled "districts" were established in the 1900s, when Taiwan was under Japanese rule. After World War II, nine out of eleven prefectural cities established by the Japanese government were reformed into provincial cities. These were Changhua, Chiayi, Hsinchu, Kaohsiung, Keelung, Pingtung, Taichung, Tainan, and Taipei. The wards (区 ku) and towns (町 machi) under those cities were merged into larger districts. At the same time, the districts (郡 kun) under prefectures were also reformed as county-controlled districts.

Divisions before 1945				Divisions after 1945 to 1950			
Name	Kanji	Japanese Hepburn	Taiwanese Pe̍h-ōe-jī	Name	Chinese	Mandarin Pinyin	Taiwanese Pe̍h-ōe-jī
Ward (under cities)	區	ku	khu	District (under cities)	區	qū	khu
District (under prefectures)	郡	kun	kūn	District (under counties)	區	qū	khu

In August 1950, another administrative division reform was undertaken, leading to a reduction in the size of counties and all townships becoming directly administered by counties. County-controlled districts were all made defunct in this reform. At the same time, provincial cities including Changhua, Chiayi, Hsinchu, and Pingtung were downgraded to county-administered cities, of which certain districts also became defunct. This made districts a type of division exclusively under the five remaining provincial cities: Kaohsiung, Keelung, Taichung, Tainan, and Taipei.

When Taipei was promoted to a special municipality by the central government in 1967, several townships surrounding the city were merged into Taipei City and reorganized as its districts. Afterwards, through another reorganization in 1990, the 12 current districts were formed. In addition, Kaohsiung, the largest city in southern Taiwan, was promoted to a special municipality in 1979. Siaogang Township was merged into Siaogang District.

In December 2010, four new special municipalities were established, namely Kaohsiung, New Taipei, Taichung, and Tainan. Subsequently, all the county-administered cities and townships in Kaohsiung, Taichung, Tainan, and Taipei counties were reformed as districts of the new Kaohsiung, Taichung, Tainan, and New Taipei cities, respectively. Their names, nevertheless, remained the same. The same thing was done to Taoyuan on 25 December 2014, with the addition of 13 new districts.

These municipalities and provincial cities use "district administrative centers" to serve residents of these districts. The directors of these districts and administrative centers are appointed by the mayors, with four years per term.

On 4 February 2014, six districts were reclassified as "Special Municipal Mountain Indigenous District" (Chinese: 直轄市山地原住民區; pinyin: Zhíxiáshì Shāndì Yuánzhùmín Qū, shortened as "Mountain Indigenous District" (山地原住民區; Shāndì Yuánzhùmín Qū)): Wulai in New Taipei, Fuxing in Taoyuan, Heping in Taichung, along with Namasia, Maolin, and Taoyuan in Kaohsiung.

== Districts in Taiwan ==
=== Districts by cities ===
In Taiwan, districts are the only subdivisions of special municipalities and provincial cities. Currently, there are 164 districts and 6 mountain indigenous districts in the country.

Division type	Special municipality						Provincial city			Total
Name	Kaohsiung	New Taipei	Taichung	Tainan	Taipei	Taoyuan	Chiayi	Hsinchu	Keelung	Total
Districts	35	28	28	37	12	12	2	3	7	164
Mountain indigenous districts	3	1	1			1				6

=== List of districts in Taiwan ===
Colors indicate the common language status of Hakka and Formosan languages within each division.

Name	Chinese	Hànyǔ Pīnyīn	Taiwanese POJ	Hakka	Formosan or others	City	Type
Zhongzheng	中正區	Zhōngzhèng	Tiong-chèng	Tsûng-tsang		Taipei	Municipal
Wanhua	萬華區	Wànhuá	Báng-kah	Van-fà	Bangka^{Basay}	Taipei	Municipal
Datong	大同區	Dàtóng	Tāi-tông	Thai-thùng		Taipei	Municipal
Zhongshan	中山區	Zhōngshān	Tiong-san	Tsûng-sân		Taipei	Municipal
Songshan	松山區	Sōngshān	Siông-san	Tshiùng-sân		Taipei	Municipal
Daan	大安區	Dà'ān	Tāi-an	Thai-ôn		Taipei	Municipal
Xinyi	信義區	Xìnyì	Sìn-gī	Sin-ngi		Taipei	Municipal
Neihu	內湖區	Nèihú	Lāi-ô͘	Nui-fù		Taipei	Municipal
Nangang	南港區	Nángǎng	Lâm-káng	Nàm-kóng		Taipei	Municipal
Shilin	士林區	Shìlín	Sū-lîm	Sṳ-lìm		Taipei	Municipal
Beitou	北投區	Běitóu	Pak-tâu	Pet-thèu		Taipei	Municipal
Wenshan	文山區	Wénshān	Bûn-san	Vùn-sân		Taipei	Municipal
Banqiao	板橋區	Bǎnqiáo	Pang-kiô	Piông-khièu		New Taipei	Municipal
Xinzhuang	新莊區	Xīnzhuāng	Sin-chng	Sîn-chông		New Taipei	Municipal
Zhonghe	中和區	Zhōnghé	Tiong-hô	Chûng-fò		New Taipei	Municipal
Yonghe	永和區	Yǒnghé	Éng-hô	Yún-fò		New Taipei	Municipal
Tucheng	土城區	Tǔchéng	Thô͘-siâⁿ	Thú-sàng		New Taipei	Municipal
Shulin	樹林區	Shùlín	Chhiū-nâ	Su-nà		New Taipei	Municipal
Sanxia	三峽區	Sānxiá	Sam-kiap	Sâm-hia̍p		New Taipei	Municipal
Yingge	鶯歌區	Yīnggē	Eng-ko	Yîn-kô		New Taipei	Municipal
Sanchong	三重區	Sānchóng	Sam-tiông/Saⁿ-tēng-po͘	Sâm-chhùng		New Taipei	Municipal
Luzhou	蘆洲區	Lúzhōu	Lô͘-chiu	Lù-chû		New Taipei	Municipal
Wugu	五股區	Wǔgǔ	Gō͘-kó͘	Ńg-kú		New Taipei	Municipal
Taishan	泰山區	Tàishān	Thài-san	Thai-sân		New Taipei	Municipal
Linkou	林口區	Línkǒu	Nâ-khàu	Nà-khiéu		New Taipei	Municipal
Bali	八里區	Bālǐ	Pat-lí	Pat-lî		New Taipei	Municipal
Tamsui	淡水區	Dànshuǐ	Tām-chuí	Thâm-súi		New Taipei	Municipal
Sanzhi	三芝區	Sānzhī	Sam-chi	Sâm-chṳ		New Taipei	Municipal
Shimen	石門區	Shímén	Chio̍h-mn̂g	Sa̍k-mùn		New Taipei	Municipal
Jinshan	金山區	Jīnshān	Kim-san	Kîm-sân		New Taipei	Municipal
Wanli	萬里區	Wànlǐ	Bān-lí	Van-lî		New Taipei	Municipal
Xizhi	汐止區	Xīzhǐ	Se̍k-chí	Sip-chṳ		New Taipei	Municipal
Ruifang	瑞芳區	Ruìfāng	Sūi-hong	Lui-fông		New Taipei	Municipal
Gongliao	貢寮區	Gòngliáo	Kòng-liâu	Kung-liàu		New Taipei	Municipal
Pingxi	平溪區	Píngxī	Pêng-khe	Phìn-hâi		New Taipei	Municipal
Shuangxi	雙溪區	Shuāngxī	Siang-khe	Sûng-hâi		New Taipei	Municipal
Xindian	新店區	Xīndiàn	Sin-tiàm	Sîn-tiam		New Taipei	Municipal
Shenkeng	深坑區	Shēnkēng	Chhim-kheⁿ	Chhṳ̂m-hâng		New Taipei	Municipal
Shiding	石碇區	Shídìng	Chio̍h-tēng	Sa̍k-tàng		New Taipei	Municipal
Pinglin	坪林區	Pínglín	Pêⁿ-nâ	Phiâng-lìm		New Taipei	Municipal
Wulai	烏來區	Wūlái	U-lai	Vû-lòi	Ulay^{Atayal}	New Taipei	Mountain indigenous
Taoyuan	桃園區	Táoyuán	Thô-hng	Thò-yèn		Taoyuan	Municipal
Zhongli	中壢區	Zhōnglì	Tiong-lek	Chûng-la̍k		Taoyuan	Municipal
Daxi	大溪區	Dàxī	Tāi-khe	Thai-hâi		Taoyuan	Municipal
Yangmei	楊梅區	Yángméi	Iûⁿ-mûi	Yông-muì		Taoyuan	Municipal
Luzhu	蘆竹區	Lúzhú	Lô·-tek	Lù-tsuk		Taoyuan	Municipal
Dayuan	大園區	Dàyuán	Toā-Hng	Thai-yèn		Taoyuan	Municipal
Guishan	龜山區	Guīshān	Ku-soaⁿ	Kuî-sân		Taoyuan	Municipal
Bade	八德區	Bādé	Pat-tek	Pat-tet		Taoyuan	Municipal
Longtan	龍潭區	Lóngtán	Liông-thâm	Liùng-thâm		Taoyuan	Municipal
Pingzhen	平鎮區	Píngzhèn	Pêng-tìn	Phìn-tsṳ́n		Taoyuan	Municipal
Xinwu	新屋區	Xīnwū	Sin-ok	Sîn-vuk		Taoyuan	Municipal
Guanyin	觀音區	Guānyīn	Koan-im	Kôn-yîm		Taoyuan	Municipal
Fuxing	復興區	Fùxīng	Hok-heng	Fu̍k-hîn	Pyasan^{Atayal}	Taoyuan	Mountain indigenous
Central	中區	Zhōng	Tiong	Chûng		Taichung	Municipal
East	東區	Dōng	Tang	Tûng		Taichung	Municipal
South	南區	Nán	Lâm	Nàm		Taichung	Municipal
West	西區	Xi	Se	Sî		Taichung	Municipal
North	北區	Běi	Pak	Pet		Taichung	Municipal
Beitun	北屯區	Běitún	Pak-tūn	Pet-tun		Taichung	Municipal
Xitun	西屯區	Xitún	Se-tūn	Sî-tun		Taichung	Municipal
Nantun	南屯區	Nántún	Lâm-tūn	Nàm-tun		Taichung	Municipal
Taiping	太平區	Tàipíng	Thài-pêng	Thai-phìn		Taichung	Municipal
Dali	大里區	Dàlǐ	Tāi-lí	Thai-lî		Taichung	Municipal
Wufeng	霧峰區	Wùfēng	Bū-hong	Vú-fûng		Taichung	Municipal
Wuri	烏日區	Wūrì	O·-ji̍t	Vû-ngit		Taichung	Municipal
Fengyuan	豐原區	Fēngyuán	Hong-goân	Fûng-ngièn		Taichung	Municipal
Houli	后里區	Hòulǐ	Aū-lí	Heu-lî		Taichung	Municipal
Shigang	石岡區	Shígāng	Chio̍h-kng	Sa̍k-kóng		Taichung	Municipal
Dongshi	東勢區	Dōngshì	Tang-sì	Tûng-sṳ		Taichung	Municipal
Xinshe	新社區	Xīnshè	Sin-siā	Sîn-sa		Taichung	Municipal
Tanzi	潭子區	Tánzĭ	Thâm-chú	Thâm-tsṳ́		Taichung	Municipal
Daya	大雅區	Dàyǎ	Tāi-ngé	Thai-ngâ		Taichung	Municipal
Shengang	神岡區	Shéngāng	Sin-kóng	Sṳ̀n-kông		Taichung	Municipal
Dadu	大肚區	Dàdù	Tōa-tō͘	Thai-tú		Taichung	Municipal
Shalu	沙鹿區	Shālù	Soa-la̍k	Sâ-lu̍k		Taichung	Municipal
Longjing	龍井區	Lóngjǐng	Liông-chéⁿ	Liùng-tsiáng		Taichung	Municipal
Wuqi	梧棲區	Wúqī	Gō·-chhe	Ǹg-tshi		Taichung	Municipal
Qingshui	清水區	Qīngshuǐ	Chheng-chúi	Tshîn-súi		Taichung	Municipal
Dajia	大甲區	Dàjiǎ	Tāi-kah	Thai-kap		Taichung	Municipal
Waipu	外埔區	Wàipǔ	Goā-po͘	Ngoi-phû		Taichung	Municipal
Daan	大安區	Dà'ān	Tāi-an	Thai-ôn		Taichung	Municipal
Heping	和平區	Hépíng	Hô-pêng	Fò-phìn	Pasing^{Atayal}	Taichung	Mountain indigenous
West Central	中西區	Zhōngxī	Tiong-se	Chûng-sî		Tainan	Municipal
East	東區	Dōng	Tang	Tûng		Tainan	Municipal
South	南區	Nán	Lâm	Nàm		Tainan	Municipal
North	北區	Běi	Pak	Pet		Tainan	Municipal
Anping	安平區	Ānpíng	An-pêng	An-phìn		Tainan	Municipal
Annan	安南區	Ānnán	An-lâm	An-nàm		Tainan	Municipal
Yongkang	永康區	Yǒngkāng	Éng-khong	Yún-không		Tainan	Municipal
Gueiren (Guiren)	歸仁區	Guīrén	Kui-jîn	Kûi-yìn		Tainan	Municipal
Sinhua (Xinhua)	新化區	Xīnhuà	Sin-hòa	Sîn-fa		Tainan	Municipal
Zuojhen (Zuozhen)	左鎮區	Zuǒzhèn	Chó-tìn	Tsó-tsṳ́n		Tainan	Municipal
Yujing	玉井區	Yùjǐng	Gio̍k-chéⁿ	Ngiu̍k-tsiáng		Tainan	Municipal
Nansi (Nanxi)	楠西區	Nánxī	Lâm-se	Nàm-sî		Tainan	Municipal
Nanhua	南化區	Nánhuà	Lâm-hòa	Nàm-fa		Tainan	Municipal
Rende	仁德區	Réndé	Jîn-tek	Yìn-tet		Tainan	Municipal
Guanmiao	關廟區	Guānmiào	Koan-biō	Kûan-meu		Tainan	Municipal
Longci (Longqi)	龍崎區	Lóngqí	Liông-kiā	Liùng-khì		Tainan	Municipal
Guantian	官田區	Guāntián	Koaⁿ-tiān	Kôn-thièn		Tainan	Municipal
Madou	麻豆區	Mádòu	Môa-tāu	Mà-theu		Tainan	Municipal
Jiali	佳里區	Jiālǐ	Ka-lí	Kâ-lî		Tainan	Municipal
Sigang (Xigang)	西港區	Xīgǎng	Sai-káng	Sî-kóng		Tainan	Municipal
Cigu (Qigu)	七股區	Qīgǔ	Chhit-kó͘	Tshit-kú		Tainan	Municipal
Jiangjun (Jiangjyun)	將軍區	Jiāngjūn	Chiong-kun	Tsiông-kiûn		Tainan	Municipal
Syuejia (Xuejia)	學甲區	Xuéjiǎ	Ha̍k-kah	Ho̍k-kap		Tainan	Municipal
Beimen	北門區	Běimén	Pak-mn̂g	Pet-mùn		Tainan	Municipal
Xinying (Sinying)	新營區	Xīnyíng	Sin-iâⁿ	Sîn-yàng		Tainan	Municipal
Houbi	後壁區	Hòubì	Āu-piah	Heu-piak		Tainan	Municipal
Baihe	白河區	Báihé	Pe̍h-hô	Pha̍k-hò		Tainan	Municipal
Dongshan	東山區	Dōngshān	Tong-san	Tûng-sân		Tainan	Municipal
Lioujia (Liujia)	六甲區	Liùjiǎ	La̍k-kah	Liuk-kap		Tainan	Municipal
Xiaying (Siaying)	下營區	Xiàyíng	Ē-iâⁿ	Ha-yàng		Tainan	Municipal
Liouying (Liuying)	柳營區	Liǔyíng	Liú-iâⁿ	Liú-yàng		Tainan	Municipal
Yanshuei (Yanshui)	鹽水區	Yánshuǐ	Kiâm-chúi	Yàm-súi		Tainan	Municipal
Shanhua	善化區	Shànhuà	Siān-hòa	San-fa		Tainan	Municipal
Danei	大內區	Dànèi	Tōa-lāi	Thai-nui		Tainan	Municipal
Shanshang	山上區	Shānshàng	San-siōng	Sân-song		Tainan	Municipal
Sinshih (Xinshi)	新市區	Xīnshì	Sin-chhī	Sîn-sṳ		Tainan	Municipal
Anding	安定區	Āndìng	An-tēng	Ôn-thin		Tainan	Municipal
Yancheng	鹽埕區	Yánchéng	Iâm-tiâⁿ	Yàm-thàng		Kaohsiung	Municipal
Gushan	鼓山區	Gǔshān	Kó͘-san	Kú-sân		Kaohsiung	Municipal
Zuoying	左營區	Zuǒyíng	Chó-iâⁿ	Tsó-yàng		Kaohsiung	Municipal
Nanzih (Nanzi)	楠梓區	Nánzǐ	Lâm-chú	Nàm-chṳ̀		Kaohsiung	Municipal
Sanmin	三民區	Sānmín	Sam-bîn	Sân-mìn		Kaohsiung	Municipal
Sinsing (Xinxing)	新興區	Xīnxīng	Sin-heng	Sîn-hîn		Kaohsiung	Municipal
Cianjin (Qianjin)	前金區	Qiánjīn	Chiân-kim	Chhièn-kîm		Kaohsiung	Municipal
Lingya	苓雅區	Língyǎ	Lêng-ngá	Lìn-ngá		Kaohsiung	Municipal
Cianjhen (Qianzhen)	前鎮區	Qiánzhèn	Chiân-tìn	Tshièn-chṳ́n		Kaohsiung	Municipal
Cijin (Qijin)	旗津區	Qíjīn	Kî-tin	Khì-chîn		Kaohsiung	Municipal
Siaogang (Xiaogang)	小港區	Xiǎogǎng	Sió-káng	Seú-kóng		Kaohsiung	Municipal
Fongshan (Fengshan)	鳳山區	Fèngshān	Hōng-soaⁿ	Fung-sân		Kaohsiung	Municipal
Linyuan	林園區	Línyuán	Lîm-hn̂g	Lìm-yèn		Kaohsiung	Municipal
Daliao	大寮區	Dàliáo	Toā-liâu	Thai-liàu		Kaohsiung	Municipal
Dashu	大樹區	Dàshù	Toā-chhiū	Thai-su		Kaohsiung	Municipal
Dashe	大社區	Dàshè	Toā-siā	Thai-sa		Kaohsiung	Municipal
Renwu	仁武區	Rénwǔ	Jîn-bú	Yìn-vú		Kaohsiung	Municipal
Niaosong	鳥松區	Niǎosōng	Chiáu-chhêng	Tiâu-tshiùng		Kaohsiung	Municipal
Gangshan	岡山區	Gāngshān	Kong-san	Kông-sân		Kaohsiung	Municipal
Ciaotou (Qiaotou)	橋頭區	Qiáotóu	Kiô-thâu	Khiâu-thèu		Kaohsiung	Municipal
Yanchao	燕巢區	Yàncháo	Iàn-châu	Yèn-tshâu		Kaohsiung	Municipal
Tianliao	田寮區	Tiánliáo	Chhân-liâu	Thièn-liàu		Kaohsiung	Municipal
Alian	阿蓮區	Ālián	A-lian	Â-lièn		Kaohsiung	Municipal
Lujhu (Luzhu)	路竹區	Lùzhú	Lō͘-tek	Lu-tsuk		Kaohsiung	Municipal
Hunei	湖內區	Húnèi	Ô͘-lāi	Fù-nui		Kaohsiung	Municipal
Qieding (Cieding)	茄萣區	Qiédìng	Ka-tiāⁿ	Kâ-tin		Kaohsiung	Municipal
Yong'an (Yong-an)	永安區	Yǒng'ān	Éng-an	Yún-ôn		Kaohsiung	Municipal
Mituo	彌陀區	Mítuó	Mî-tô	Mì-thò		Kaohsiung	Municipal
Ziguan (Zihguan)	梓官區	Zǐguān	Chú-koaⁿ	Tsṳ́-kôn		Kaohsiung	Municipal
Cishan (Qishan)	旗山區	Qíshān	Kî-san	Khì-sân		Kaohsiung	Municipal
Meinong	美濃區	Měinóng	Bi-long	Mî-nùng		Kaohsiung	Municipal
Liouguei (Liugui)	六龜區	Liùguī	La̍k-ku	Liuk-kuî		Kaohsiung	Municipal
Jiasian (Jiaxian)	甲仙區	Jiǎxiān	Kah-sian	Kap-siên		Kaohsiung	Municipal
Shanlin	杉林區	Shānlín	Sam-nâ	Tsham-lìm		Kaohsiung	Municipal
Neimen	內門區	Nèimén	Lāi-mn̂g	Nui-mùn		Kaohsiung	Municipal
Maolin	茂林區	Màolín	Bō͘-lîm	Meu-lìm	Teldreka^{Rukai}	Kaohsiung	Mountain indigenous
Taoyuan (Tauyuan)	桃源區	Táoyuán	Thô-goân	Thò-ngièn	Ngani^{Bunun}	Kaohsiung	Mountain indigenous
Namasia (Namaxia)	那瑪夏區	Nàmǎxià	Namasia	Namasia	Namasia^{Bunun, Kanakanavu}	Kaohsiung	Mountain indigenous
East	東區	Dōng	Tang	Tûng		Chiayi	Municipal
West	西區	Xī	Se	Sî		Chiayi	Municipal
East	東區	Dōng	Tang	Tûng		Hsinchu	Municipal
North	北區	Běi	Pak	Pet		Hsinchu	Municipal
Xiangshan	香山區	Xiāngshān	Hiong-san	Hiông-sân		Hsinchu	Municipal
Zhongzheng	中正區	Zhōngzhèng	Tiong-chèng	Tsûng-tsang		Keelung	Municipal
Zhongshan	中山區	Zhōngshān	Tiong-san	Tsûng-sân		Keelung	Municipal
Ren'ai	仁愛區	Rén'ài	Jîn-ài	Yìn-oi		Keelung	Municipal
Xinyi	信義區	Xìnyì	Sìn-gī	Sin-ngi		Keelung	Municipal
Anle	安樂區	Ānlè	An-lo̍k	Ôn-lo̍k		Keelung	Municipal
Nuannuan	暖暖區	Nuǎnnuǎn	Lóan-lóan	Nôn-nôn		Keelung	Municipal
Qidu	七堵區	Qīdǔ	Chhit-tó͘	Tshit-tù		Keelung	Municipal

== Former districts ==
=== District changes between 1945 and 1950 ===
City	Districts		Aftermath
City	1945 – 1946	1946 – 1950	Aftermath
Changhua	Chang-pei (彰北區)		Changhua county-administered city Districts were defunct
Changhua	Chang-hsi (彰西區)		Changhua county-administered city Districts were defunct
Changhua	Chang-nan (彰南區)		Changhua county-administered city Districts were defunct
Changhua	Ta-chu (大竹區)		Changhua county-administered city Districts were defunct
Chiayi	Tung-men (東門區)	Hsin-tung (新東區)	Chiayi county-administered city Districts were defunct Then East and West Districts, Chiayi (provincial city)
Chiayi	Tung-shan (東山區)	Hsin-tung (新東區)	Chiayi county-administered city Districts were defunct Then East and West Districts, Chiayi (provincial city)
Chiayi	Nan-men (南門區)	Hsin-nan (新南區)	Chiayi county-administered city Districts were defunct Then East and West Districts, Chiayi (provincial city)
Chiayi	Pa-chiang (八獎區)	Hsin-nan (新南區)	Chiayi county-administered city Districts were defunct Then East and West Districts, Chiayi (provincial city)
Chiayi	Hsi-men (西門區)	Hsin-hsi (新西區)	Chiayi county-administered city Districts were defunct Then East and West Districts, Chiayi (provincial city)
Chiayi	Chu-wei (竹圍區)	Hsin-hsi (新西區)	Chiayi county-administered city Districts were defunct Then East and West Districts, Chiayi (provincial city)
Chiayi	Pei-men (北門區)	Hsin-pei (新北區)	Chiayi county-administered city Districts were defunct Then East and West Districts, Chiayi (provincial city)
Chiayi	Pei-chen (北鎮區)	Hsin-pei (新北區)	Chiayi county-administered city Districts were defunct Then East and West Districts, Chiayi (provincial city)
Chiayi	(part of Tainan County)	Shui-shang (水上區)	Shuishang Township, Chiayi County
Chiayi	(part of Tainan County)	Tai-pao (太保區)	Taibao City, Chiayi County
Hsinchu	East (東區)		Hsinchu county-administered city Districts were defunct Then East and North Districts, Hsinchu (provincial city)
Hsinchu	South (南區)		Hsinchu county-administered city Districts were defunct Then East and North Districts, Hsinchu (provincial city)
Hsinchu	West (西區)		Hsinchu county-administered city Districts were defunct Then East and North Districts, Hsinchu (provincial city)
Hsinchu	North (北區)		Hsinchu county-administered city Districts were defunct Then East and North Districts, Hsinchu (provincial city)
Hsinchu	Hsiang-shan (香山區)		Hsiang-shan Township in Hsinchu County, then Xiangshan District, Hsinchu (provincial city)
Hsinchu	(part of Hsinchu County)	Chu-tung (竹東區)	Zhudong Township, Hsinchu County
Hsinchu	(part of Hsinchu County)	Pao-shan (寶山區)	Baoshan Township, Hsinchu County
Pingtung	Central (中區)		Pingtung county-administered city Districts were defunct
Pingtung	East (東區)		Pingtung county-administered city Districts were defunct
Pingtung	South (南區)		Pingtung county-administered city Districts were defunct
Pingtung	North (北區)		Pingtung county-administered city Districts were defunct
Pingtung	(part of Kaohsiung County)	Wan-tan (萬丹區)	Wandan Township, Pingtung County
Pingtung	(part of Kaohsiung County)	Chang-chih (長治區)	Changzhi and Linluo Townships, Pingtung County
Pingtung	(part of Kaohsiung County)	Chiu-ju (九如區)	Jiuru Township, Pingtung County

=== District reforms in Taipei ===
1945 – 1968	1968 – 1990	After 1990
Chien-cheng (建成區)		Datong
Yen-ping (延平區)		Datong
Ta-tung (大同區)		Datong
Cheng-chung (城中區)		Zhongzheng
Ku-ting (古亭區)		Zhongzheng
Shuang-yuan (雙園區)		Wanhua
Lung-shan (龍山區)		Wanhua
(part of Taipei County)	Ching-mei	Wenshan
(part of Taipei County)	Mu-cha	Wenshan

== See also ==
- Administrative divisions of Taiwan
- List of administrative divisions of Taiwan

Overview of administrative divisions of the Republic of China
Republic of China
Free area (Note: Also known as the Taiwan area or Tai–Min area (Chinese: 臺閩地區; lit. 'Taiwan–Fujian area'))					Mainland area (Note: The mainland area consists of Mainland China, Tibet and (previously) Outer Mongolia)
Special municipalities (Note: Has an elected executive and an elected legislative council.) (Note: Special municipalities, cities, and county-administered cities are all called shi (Chinese: 市; lit. 'city'))		Provinces (Note: Nominal; provincial governments have been abolished)			Not administered (Note: Constitutionally having the same structure as the free area, these are currently under the Chinese Communist Party control with a different structure)
Special municipalities		Counties		Autonomous municipalities (Note: Sometimes called cities (Chinese: 市) or provincial cities (Chinese: 省轄市) to distinguish them from special municipalities and county-administered cities)	Not administered
Districts (Note: Has an appointed district administrator for managing local affairs and carrying out tasks commissioned by superior agency.)	Mountain indigenous districts	County- administered cities	Townships (Note: There are two types of townships: rural townships or xīang (Chinese: 鄉) and urban townships or zhèn (Chinese: 鎮))	Districts	Not administered
Villages (Note: Has an elected village administrator for managing local affairs and carrying out tasks commissioned by superior agency.) (Note: Villages in rural townships are known as cūn (Chinese: 村), those in other jurisdictions are known as lǐ (Chinese: 里))					Not administered
Neighborhoods					Not administered
