= Tainan City Zuojhen Fossil Park =

Gallery in Zhuozhen, Tainan, Taiwan

- 臺南左鎮化石園區
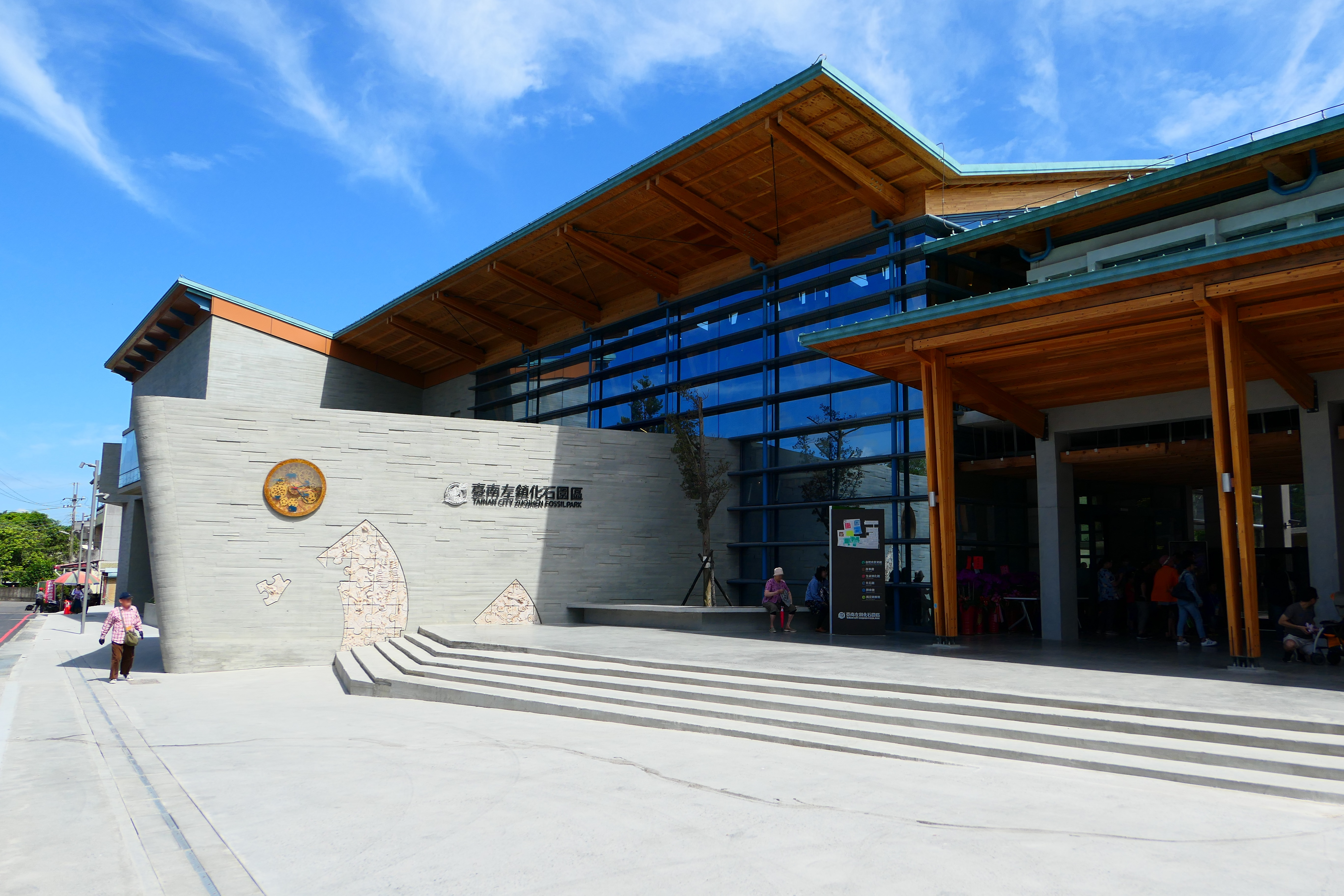
- Interactive map of the Tainan City Zuojhen Fossil Park area
- Former names: Tsai-liao Fossil Museum, Natural History Educational Hall, Guangrong Elementary School

General information
- Type: gallery
- Location: Zhuozhen, Tainan, Taiwan
- Coordinates: 23°03′51.5″N 120°23′21.0″E
- Opened: 12 May 2019

Website
- Official website

The Tainan City Zuojhen Fossil Park (traditional Chinese: 臺南左鎮化石園區; simplified Chinese: 台南左镇化石园区; Hanyu Pinyin: Táinán Zuǒzhèn Huàshí Yuánqū; Tongyong Pinyin: Táinán Zuǒjhèn Huàshíh Yuáncyu) is a gallery about fossil in Zhuozhen District, Tainan, Taiwan.

== History ==
The gallery was established by combining the Guangrong Elementary School, Natural History Educational Hall and the former Tsai-liao Fossil Museum. It was opened on 12 May 2019.

== Architecture ==
The gallery spans over an area of 9,000 m^{2} and consists of five exhibition spaces.

== See also ==
- Prehistory of Taiwan
