= Longci District =

District in Tainan, Taiwan

Coordinates: 22.9546°N 120.383323°E

Longci 龍崎區 Tatsuzaki
- District
- Longci District
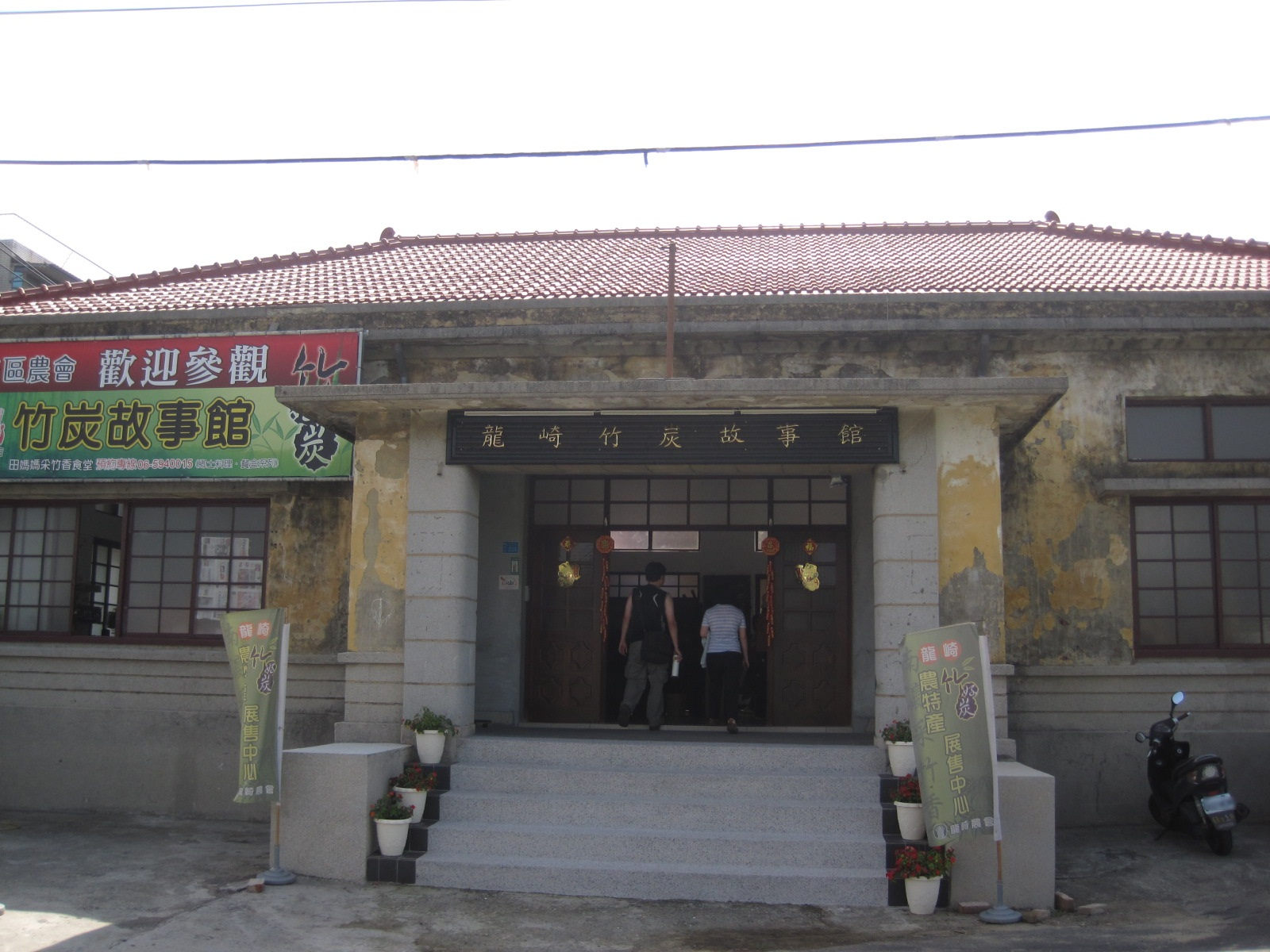
- The former Township Hall in Longci

- 龍崎區公所; Longci District Tainan City

- Longci District in Tainan City
- Location: Tainan, Taiwan

Area
  - Total: 64 km^{2} (25 sq mi)

Population (May 2022)
  - Total: 3,634
  - Density: 57/km^{2} (150/sq mi)
- Website: longci.tainan.gov.tw/en/

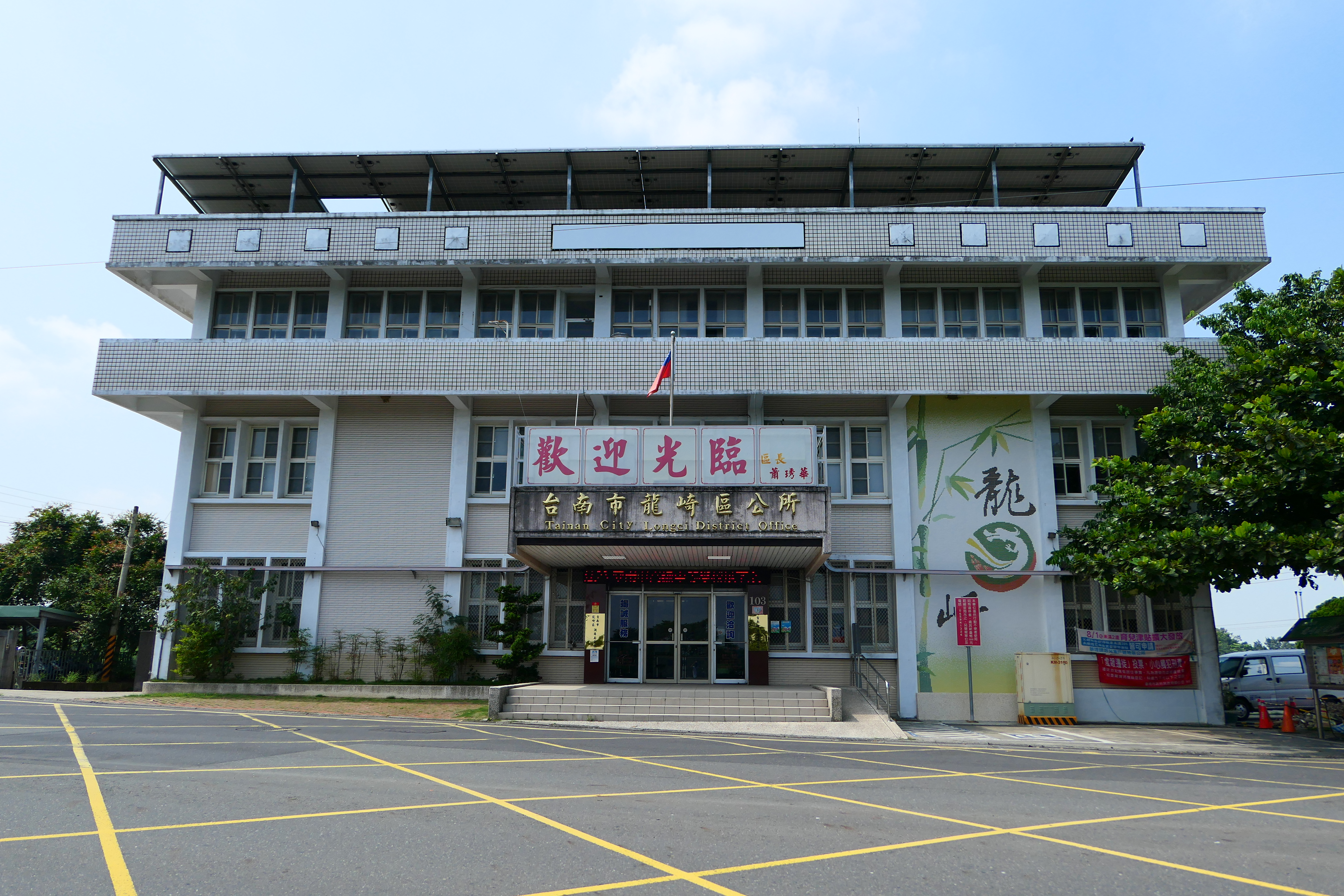
Longci District Office

Longci District (Chinese: 龍崎區; Hanyu Pinyin: Lóngqí Qū; Tongyong Pinyin: Lóngcí Cyu; Wade–Giles: Lung^{2}-ch'i^{2} Ch'ü^{1}; Pe̍h-ōe-jī: Liông-kiā-khu), alternatively spelled Longqi. is a rural district of about 3,634 residents in Tainan, Taiwan.

== History ==
After the handover of Taiwan from Japan to the Republic of China in 1945, Longci was organized as a rural township of Tainan County. On 25 December 2010, Tainan County was merged with Tainan City and Longci was upgraded to a district of the city.

== Geography ==
Longci District borders Sinhua District and Zuojhen District to the north; Neimen District, Kaohsiung to the east; Guanmiao District to the west; and Tianliao District, Kaohsiung to the south.

== Administrative divisions ==
The district consists of Qiding, Tuqi, Zhongkeng, Nankeng, Niupu, Daping, Longchuan and Shicao Village.

== Tourist attractions ==
- Cingshuei Temple
- Husing Mountain Resort Park
- Nioupu Village
- Oolong Pond
