= Xiaying District =

District in Tainan, Taiwan

Coordinates: 23°13′44.6″N 120°15′52.4″E

Xiaying 下營區
- District
- Xiaying District
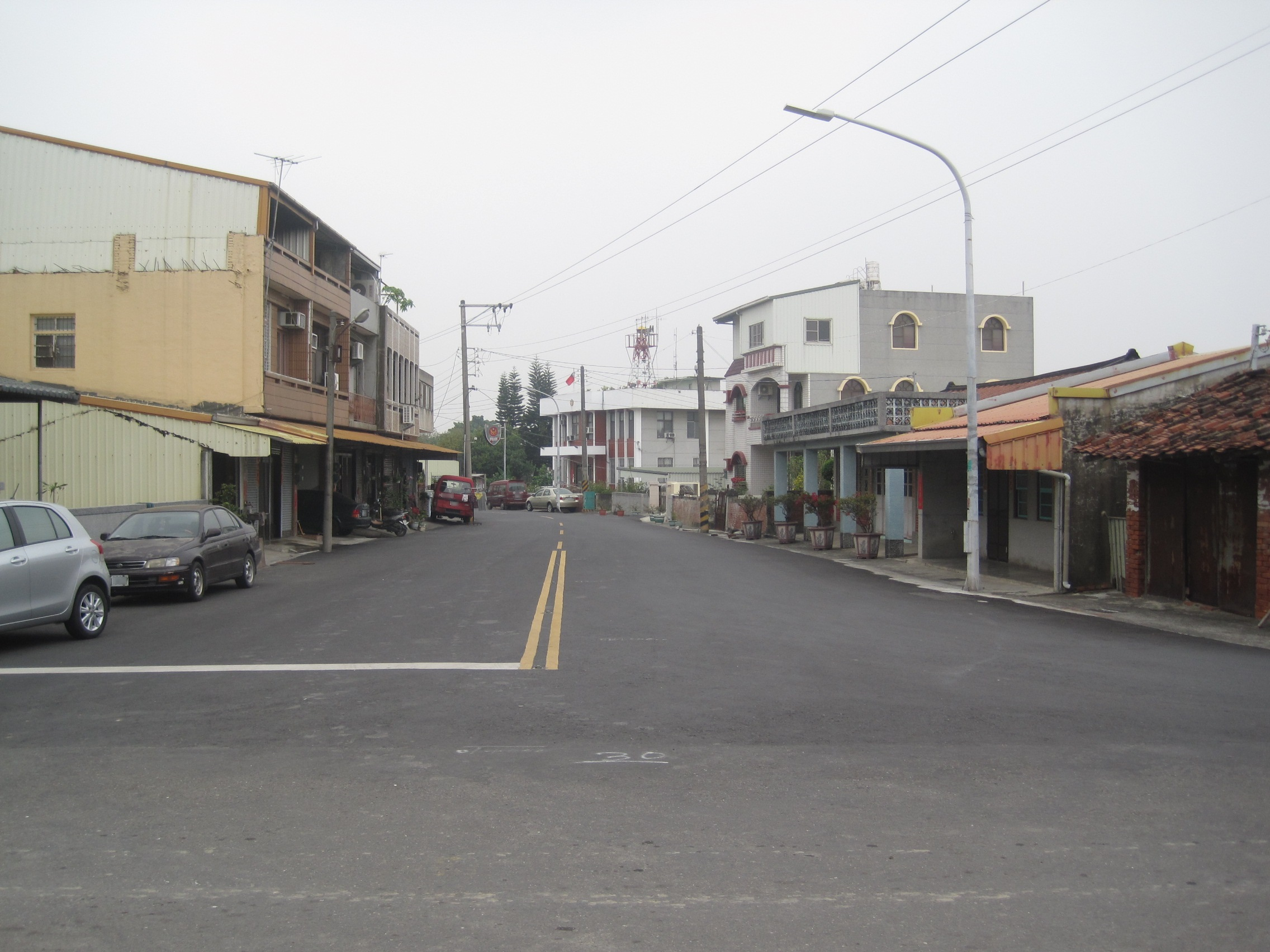

- Xiaying District in Tainan City
- Location: Tainan, Taiwan

Area
  - Total: 34 km^{2} (13 sq mi)

Population (May 2022)
  - Total: 22,825
  - Density: 670/km^{2} (1,700/sq mi)
- Website: web.tainan.gov.tw/Xiaying_en/

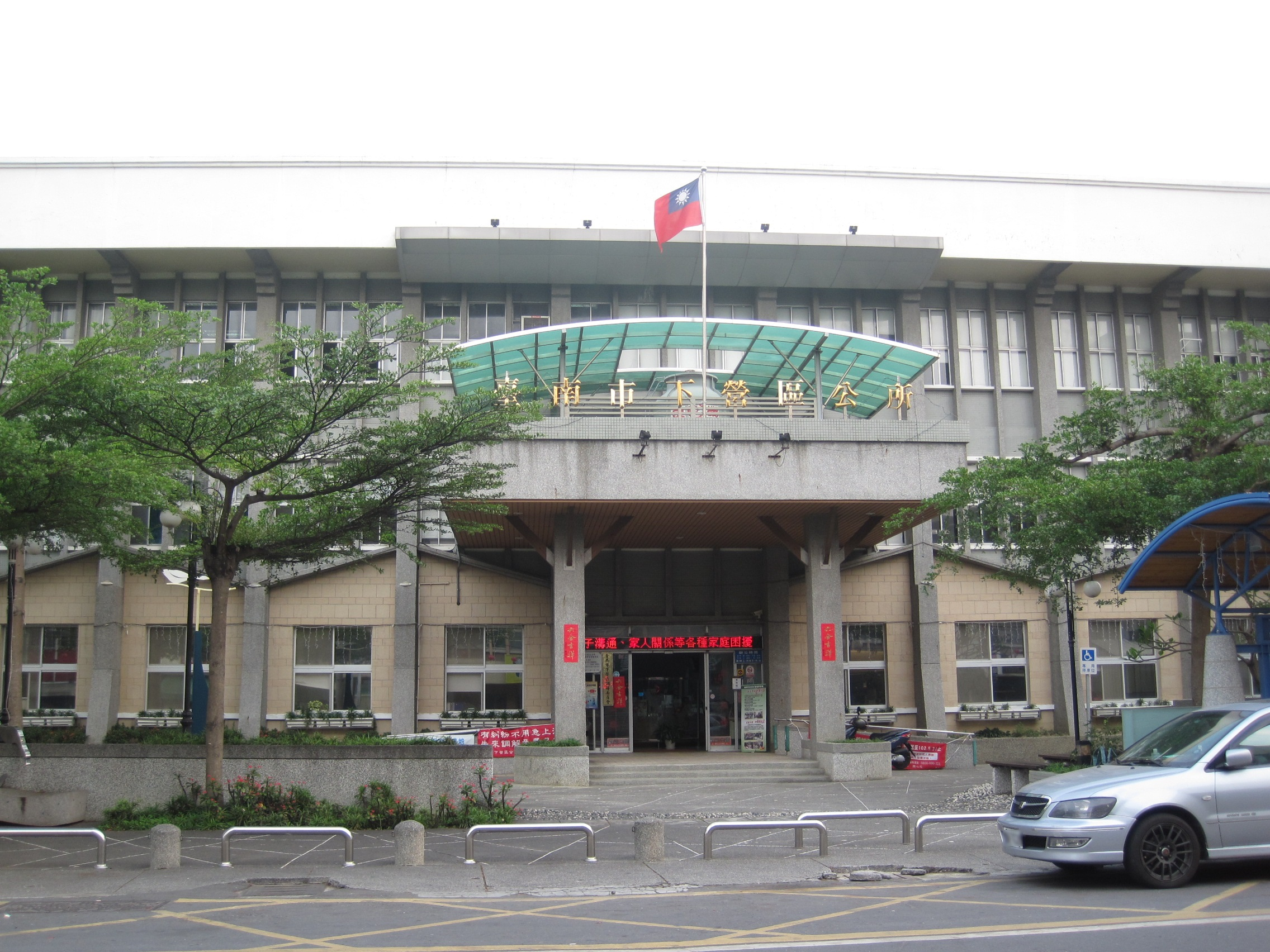
Xiaying District office

Xiaying District (Chinese: 下營區; Hanyu Pinyin: Xiàyíng Qū; Tongyong Pinyin: Siàyíng Cyu; Wade–Giles: Hsia^{4}-ying^{2} Ch'ü^{1}; Pe̍h-ōe-jī: Ē-iâⁿ-khu) is a rural district of about 22,825 residents in Tainan, Taiwan.

== History ==
After the handover of Taiwan from Japan to the Republic of China in 1945, Xiaying was organized as a rural township of Tainan County. On 25 December 2010, Tainan County was merged with Tainan City and Xiaying was upgraded to a district of the city.

== Administrative divisions ==
Xiaying, Renli, Zhainei, Houjie, Xinxing, Yingqian, Datun, Dabei, Maogang, Zhongying, Kaihua, Xilian, Hejian, Jiazhong and Hongcuo Village.

== Tourist attractions ==
- Sinying Sugar Plant

== Notable natives ==
- Chen Wei-zen, Minister of the Interior (2014–2016)
- Yen Shui-long, former painter and sculptor
