= Tainan County =

Former county of Taiwan

Coordinates: 22.9833°N 120.1833°E

Tainan County 臺南縣
- County of the Republic of China
- 1946–2010
- Flag

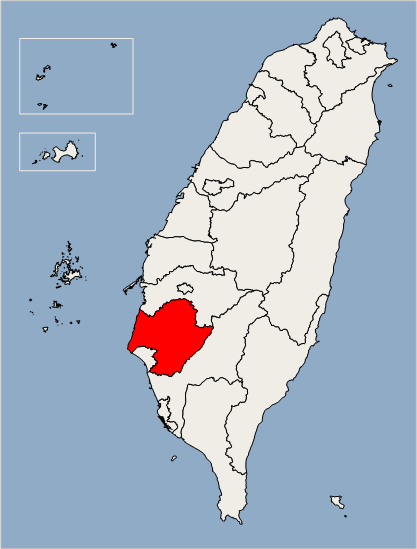
- Location of Tainan County on Taiwan.
- Capital: Sinying
- History
  - Established: 7 January 1946
  - Disestablished: 25 December 2010
- Political subdivisions: 2 County-administered cities 7 Urban townships 22 Rural townships
| Preceded by | Succeeded by |
| Tainan Prefecture | Tainan |
- Today part of: Tainan (Special municipality)

Tainan County
- Traditional Chinese: 臺南縣 or 台南縣
Transcriptions
Standard Mandarin
- Hanyu Pinyin: Táinán Xiàn
- Wade–Giles: T'ai²-nan² Hsien⁴
- Tongyong Pinyin: Táinán Siàn
Hakka
- Romanization: Thòi-nàm Yen
Southern Min
- Hokkien POJ: Tâi-lâm-koān

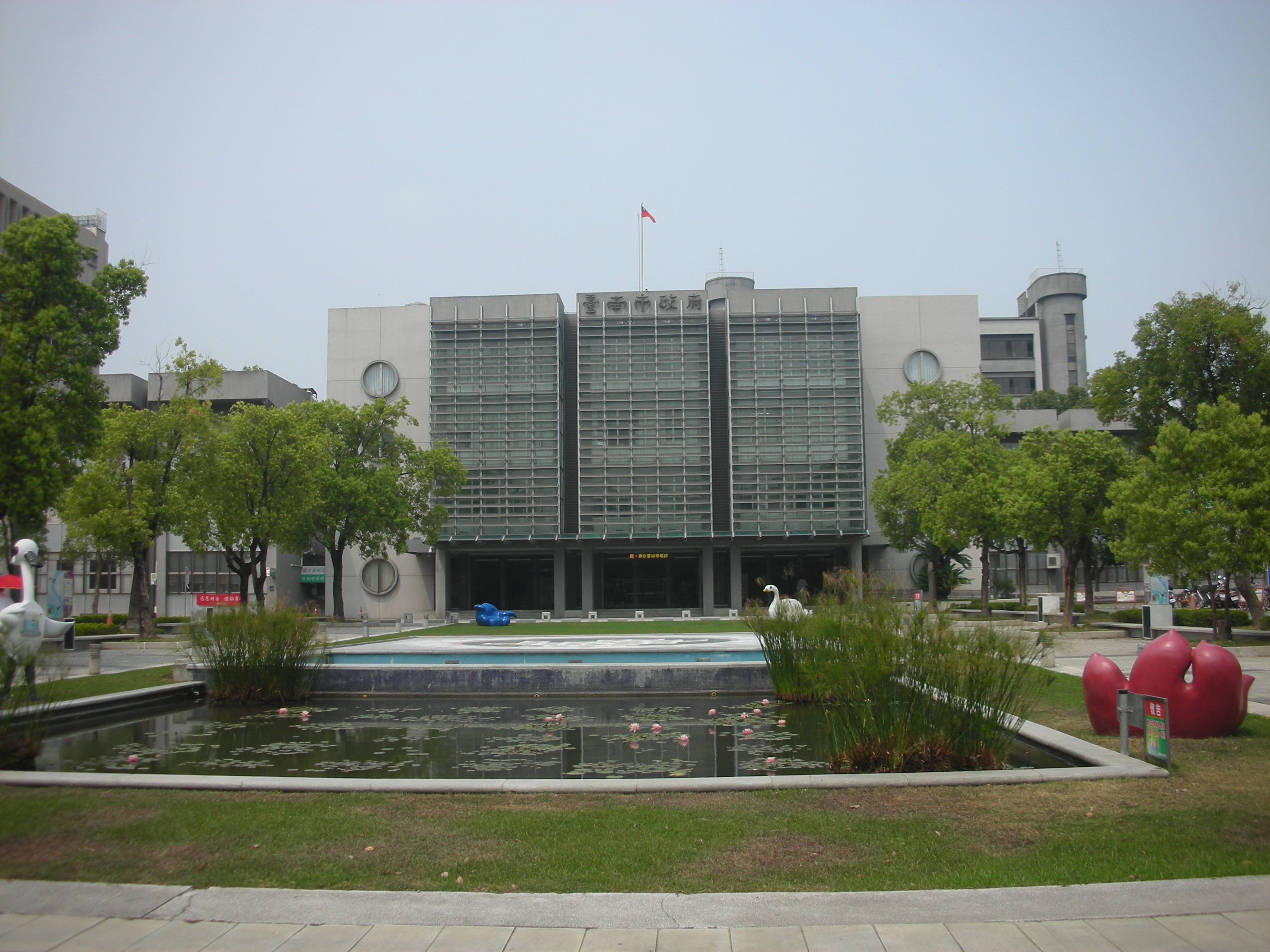
Former Tainan County Government

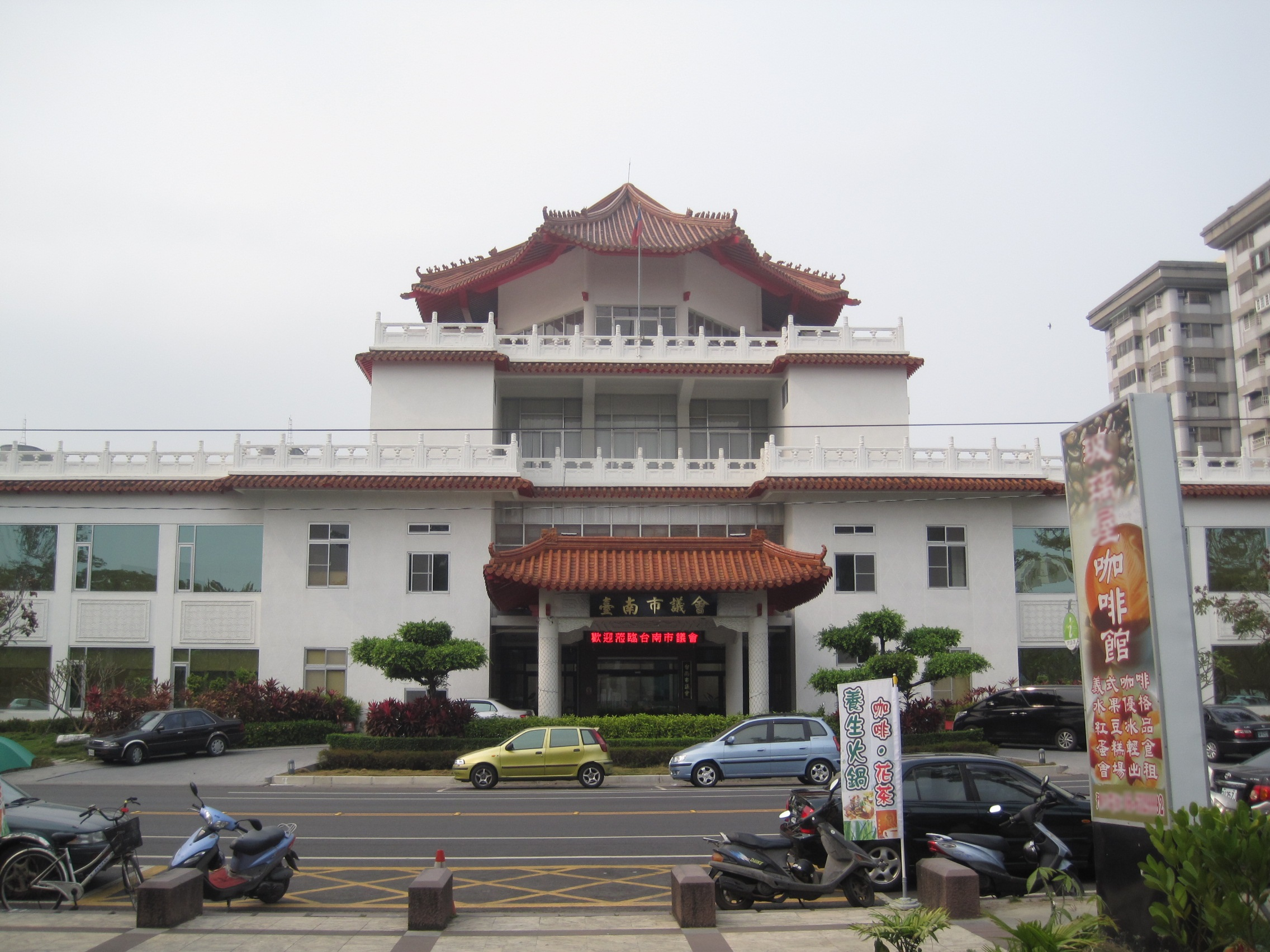
Former Tainan County Council

Tainan County was a county in southern Taiwan between 1945 and 2010. The county seat was in Sinying City.

== History ==
Tainan County was established on 7 January 1946 on the territory of Tainan Prefecture (臺南州) shortly after the end of World War II. In the early years, Tainan County consists of most territory of Tainan Prefecture except the territory near cities of Tainan and Kagi (Chiayi). The county is subdivide into districts (區), which is reformed from Japanese districts (郡). The districts are divided into townships.

| Districts in Tainan Prefecture | | Districts in Tainan County | | Notes |
|---|---|---|---|---|
| Shin'ei | 新営郡 | Hsin-ying | 新營區 | Defunct in July 1946, townships controlled by the County directly |
| Niitoyo | 新豐郡 | Hsin-feng | 新豐區 | |
| Shinka | 新化郡 | Hsin-hua | 新化區 | |
| Sobun | 曽文郡 | Tseng-wen | 曾文區 | |
| Hokumon | 北門郡 | Pei-men | 北門區 | |
| Kagi | 嘉義郡 | Chia-yi | 嘉義區 | |
| Tōseki | 東石郡 | Tung-shih | 東石區 | |
| Toroku | 斗六郡 | Tou-liu | 斗六區 | |
| Kobi | 虎尾郡 | Hu-wei | 虎尾區 | |
| Hokukō | 北港郡 | Pei-kang | 北港區 | |

On 16 August 1950, another division reform was implemented. The northern part of the county was separated and established Chiayi County and Yunlin County. The remaining Tainan County has territory equivalent to the Shin'ei (Hsinying), Niitoyo (Hsinfeng), Shinka (Hsinhua), Sobun (Tsengwen), and Hokumon (Peimen) in the Japanese era. In addition, districts in the remaining part of Kaohsiung County was defunct. All townships were directly controlled by the County Government. On 25 December 2010, the county merged with Tainan City to form a larger single special municipality.

== Administrative divisions ==
The subdivisions of the County remains mostly stable between 1950 and 2010. However, some changed has also been made.

- 10 Mar 1946, Anshun (安順鄉) was merged into Tainan City and reformed from a rural township to a district.
- 2 Feb 1968, Hsuehchia (學甲鄉) reformed from a rural township to an urban township for its population.
- 25 Dec 1981, Hsinying (新營鎮) reformed from an urban township to a county-administered city for its position as a county seat.
- 1 May 1993, Yungkang (永康鄉) reformed from a rural township to a county-administered city for its population.

In 25 Dec 2010, The county was merged with Tainan City, all cities and townships became districts. On the eve of merging with Tainan City, the county consists of the following administrative divisions

| Type | Name | Chinese | Taiwanese | Hakka | Region |
|---|---|---|---|---|---|
| Cities | Sinying (Xinying) | 新營市 | Sin-iâⁿ | Sîn-yàng | Sinying |
| Cities | Yongkang | 永康市 | Éng-khong | Yún-không | Sinfeng |
| Urban townships | Yanshuei (Yanshui) | 鹽水鎮 | Kiâm-chúi | Yàm-súi | Sinying |
| Urban townships | Baihe | 白河鎮 | Pe̍h-hô | Pha̍k-hò | Sinying |
| Urban townships | Madou | 麻豆鎮 | Môa-tāu | Mà-theu | Tsengwen |
| Urban townships | Jiali | 佳里鎮 | Ka-lí | Kâ-lî | Peimen |
| Urban townships | Syuejia (Xuejia) | 學甲鎮 | Ha̍k-kah | Ho̍k-kap | Peimen |
| Urban townships | Sinhua (Xinhua) | 新化鎮 | Sin-hòa | Sîn-fa | Sinhua |
| Urban townships | Shanhua | 善化鎮 | Siān-hòa | San-fa | Sinhua |
| Rural townships | Liouying (Liuying) | 柳營鄉 | Liú-iâⁿ | Liú-yàng | Sinying |
| Rural townships | Houbi | 後壁鄉 | Āu-piah | Heu-piak | Sinying |
| Rural townships | Dongshan | 東山鄉 | Tong-san | Tûng-sân | Sinying |
| Rural townships | Siaying (Xiaying) | 下營鄉 | Ē-iâⁿ | Ha-yàng | Tsengwen |
| Rural townships | Lioujia (Liujia) | 六甲鄉 | La̍k-kah | Liuk-kap | Tsengwen |
| Rural townships | Guantian | 官田鄉 | Koaⁿ-tiān | Kôn-thièn | Tsengwen |
| Rural townships | Danei | 大內鄉 | Tōa-lāi | Thai-nui | Tsengwen |
| Rural townships | Sigang (Xigang) | 西港鄉 | Sai-káng | Sî-kóng | Peimen |
| Rural townships | Cigu (Qigu) | 七股鄉 | Chhit-kó͘ | Tshit-kú | Peimen |
| Rural townships | Jiangjyun (Jiangjun) | 將軍鄉 | Chiong-kun | Tsiông-kiûn | Peimen |
| Rural townships | Beimen | 北門鄉 | Pak-mn̂g | Pet-mùn | Peimen |
| Rural townships | Sinshih (Xinshi) | 新市鄉 | Sin-chhī | Sîn-sṳ | Sinhua |
| Rural townships | Anding | 安定鄉 | An-tēng | Ôn-thin | Sinhua |
| Rural townships | Shanshang | 山上鄉 | San-siōng | Sân-song | Sinhua |
| Rural townships | Yujing | 玉井鄉 | Gio̍k-chéⁿ | Ngiu̍k-tsiáng | Sinhua |
| Rural townships | Nansi (Nanxi) | 楠西鄉 | Lâm-se | Nàm-sî | Sinhua |
| Rural townships | Nanhua | 南化鄉 | Lâm-hòa | Nàm-fa | Sinhua |
| Rural townships | Zuojhen (Zuozhen) | 左鎮鄉 | Chó-tìn | Tsó-tsṳ́n | Sinhua |
| Rural townships | Rende | 仁德鄉 | Jîn-tek | Yìn-tet | Sinfeng |
| Rural townships | Gueiren (Guiren) | 歸仁鄉 | Kui-jîn | Kûi-yìn | Sinfeng |
| Rural townships | Guanmiao | 關廟鄉 | Koan-biō | Kûan-meu | Sinfeng |
| Rural townships | Longci (Longqi) | 龍崎鄉 | Liông-kiā | Liùng-khì | Sinfeng |

== See also ==
- Tainan
