= Tungshan District =

Tungshan District (Chinese: 東山區), formerly Shantzuting District (山子頂區), was one of administrative districts of Chiayi City in 1945. In 1946, Tungshan District was merged with Tungmen District to form Hsintung District.

== See also ==
- Chiayi City
