= Zuojhen District =

District in Tainan, Taiwan

Coordinates: 22.955232°N 120.385383°E

Zuojhen 左鎮區 Tsochen
- District
- Zuojhen District
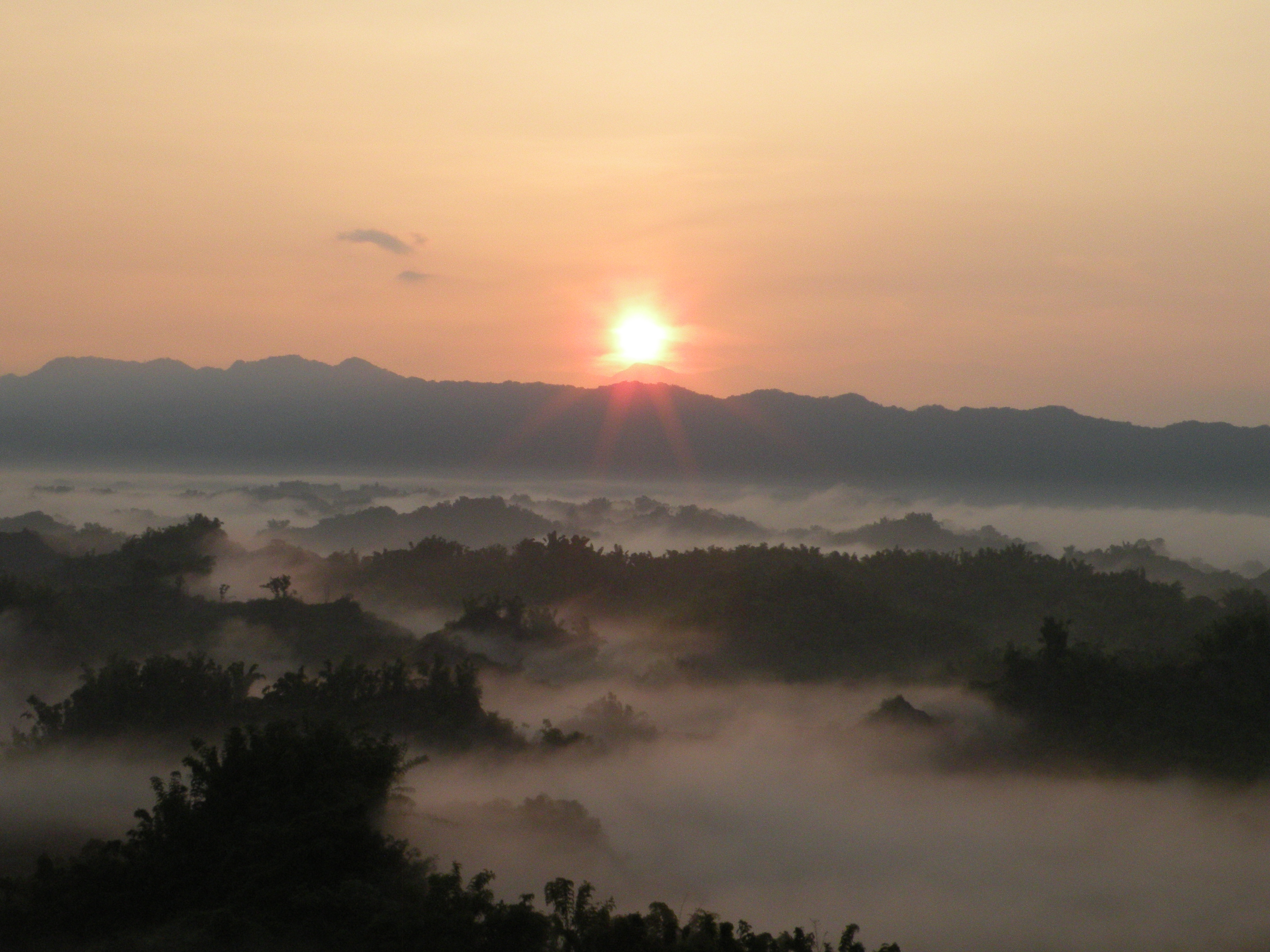

- 臺南市左鎮區公所; Tainan City; Zuojhen District Office

- Zuojhen District in Tainan City
- Location: Tainan, Taiwan

Area
  - Total: 75 km^{2} (29 sq mi)

Population (May 2022)
  - Total: 4,410
  - Density: 59/km^{2} (150/sq mi)
- Website: web.tainan.gov.tw/ZuojhenDistrict_en/

Zuojhen District (Chinese: 左鎮區; Hanyu Pinyin: Zuǒzhèn Qū; Tongyong Pinyin: Zuǒjhèn Cyu; Pe̍h-ōe-jī: Chó-tìn-khu) is a rural district of about 4,410 residents in Tainan, Taiwan.

== History ==
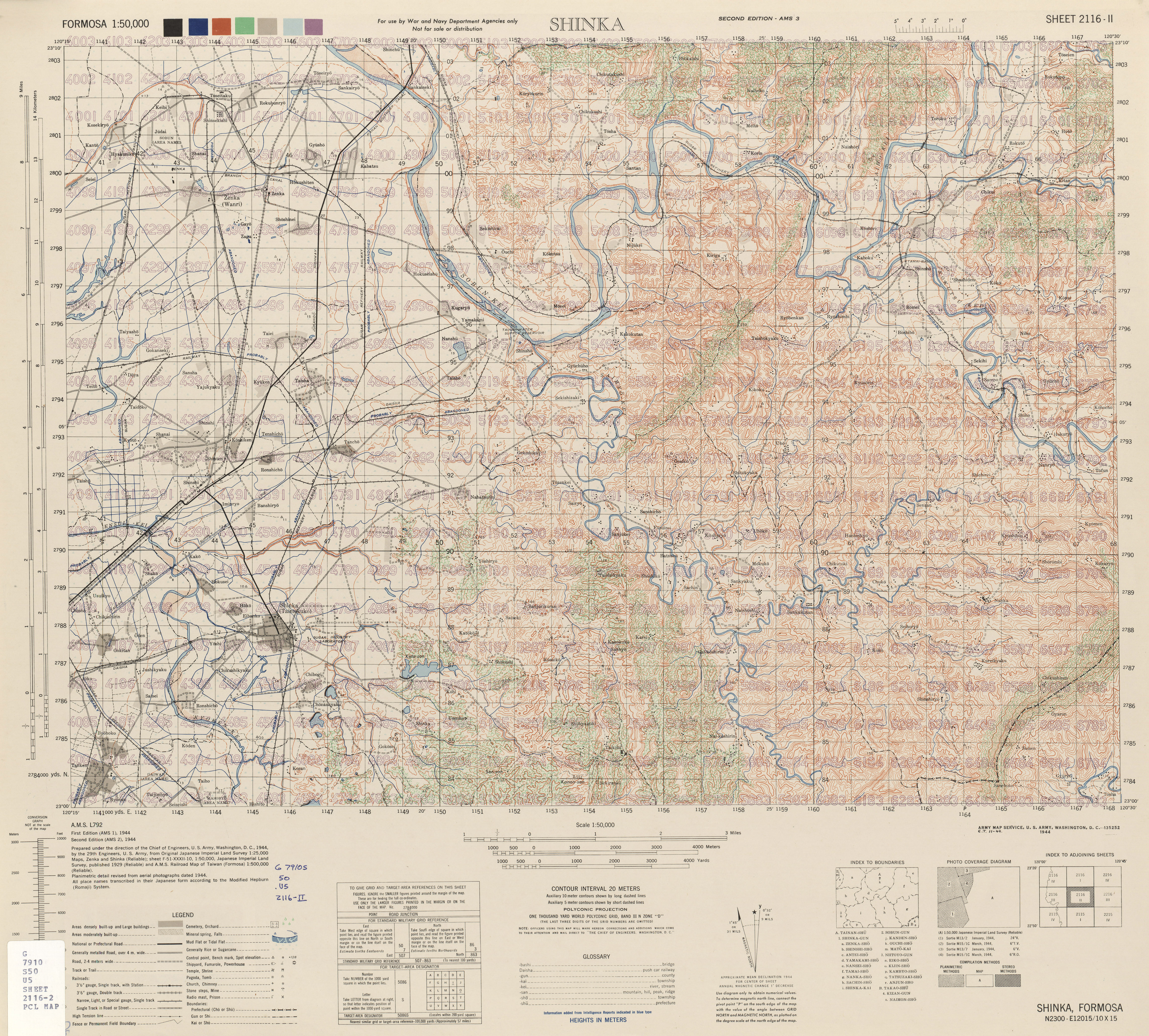
Map including Zuojhen (labeled as Sachin) (1944)

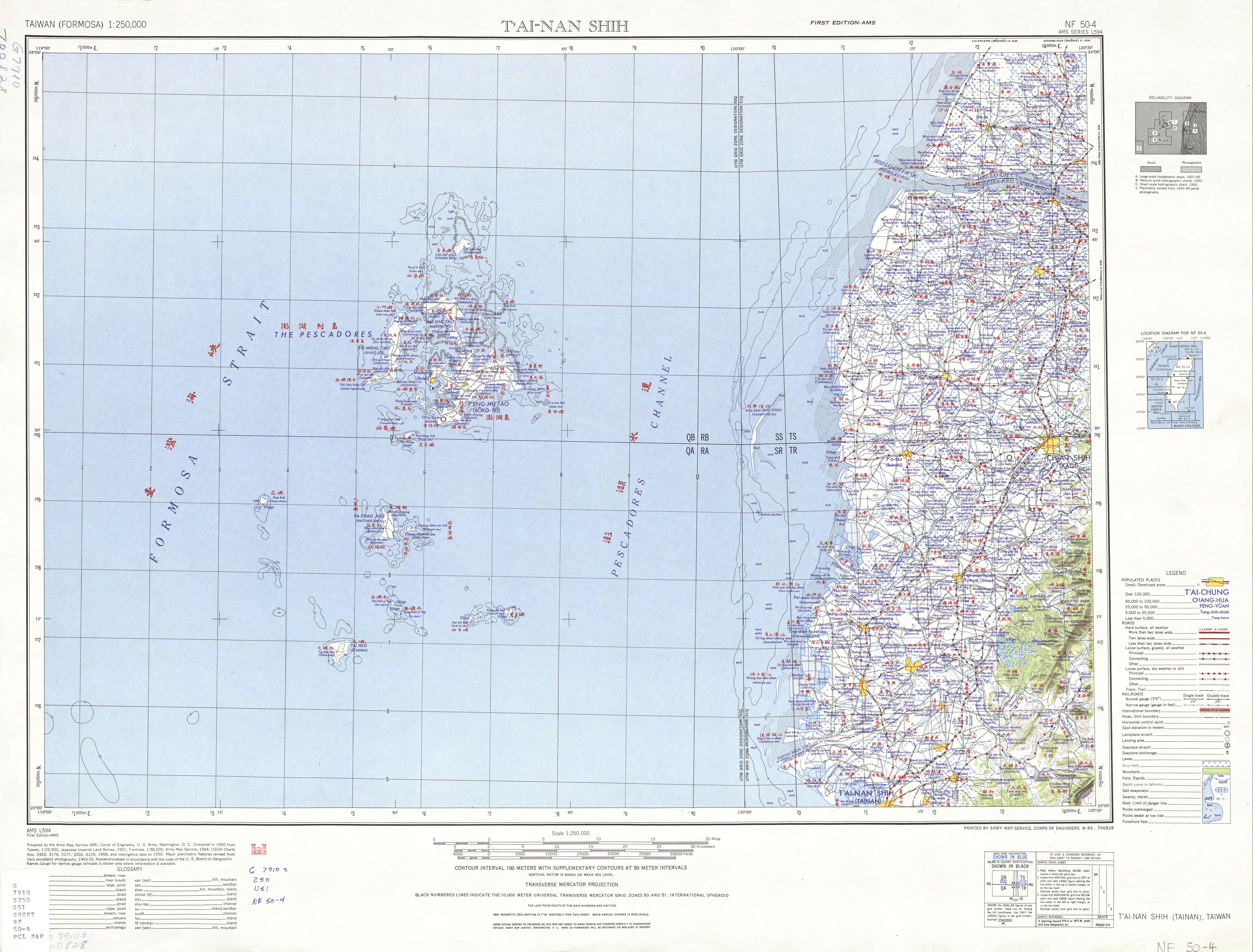
Map including Zuojhen (labeled as Tso-chen-chuang (Sachinshō) 左鎮庄) (1950)

After the handover of Taiwan from Japan to the Republic of China in 1945, Zuojhen was organized as a rural township of Tainan County. On 25 December 2010, Tainan County was merged with Tainan City and Zuojhen was upgraded to a district of the city.

== Administrative divisions ==
The district consists of Guanghe, Ronghe, Zuozhen, Zhongzheng, Muguang, Neizhuang, Dengshan, Ganglin, Caoshan and Erliao Village.

== Tourist attractions ==
- Tainan City Zuojhen Fossil Park
- Ancient Woods of Hengshan Ancestors
- Cailiao Fossil Museum
- Caoshan Moon World
- Luo Lai-Shou Museum
- Museum of Natural History
- Oyster Glass Window
- Yanshuei Keng Bubbling Mud
