= Anding District, Tainan =

District in Tainan, Taiwan

Anding 安定區
- District
- Anding District
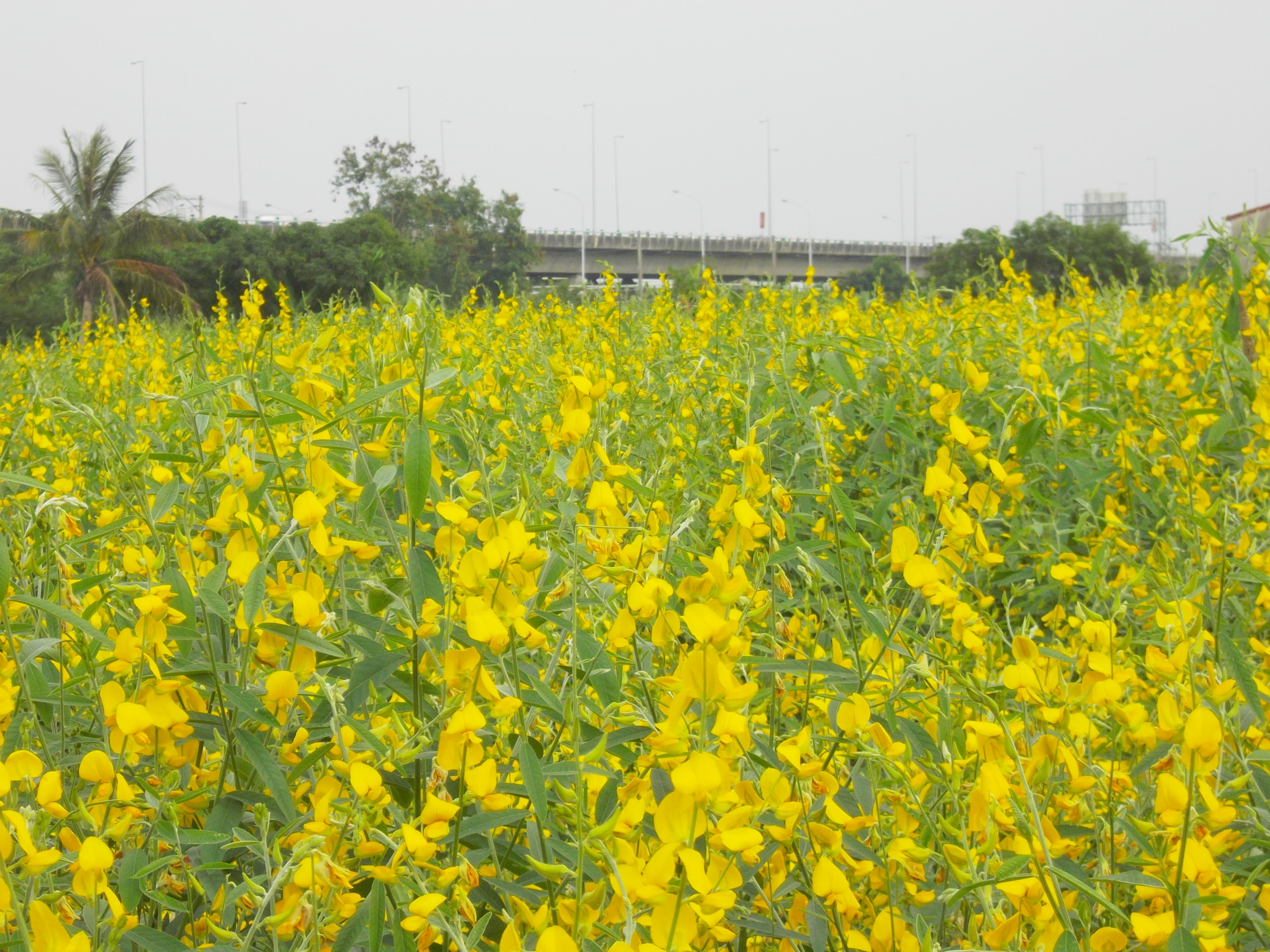
- Sesame fields in Anding

- Location in Taiwan
- Coordinates: 23°5′57.53″N 120°13′37.79″E
- Country: Republic of China (Taiwan)
- Special municipality: Tainan

Area
  - Total: 12.07 sq mi (31.27 km^{2})
- Elevation: 16 ft (5 m)

Population (January 2023)
  - Total: 29,914
  - Density: 2,480/sq mi (959/km^{2})
- Time zone: UTC+8 (+8)
- Postal code: 745
- Website: web.tainan.gov.tw/anding_en/

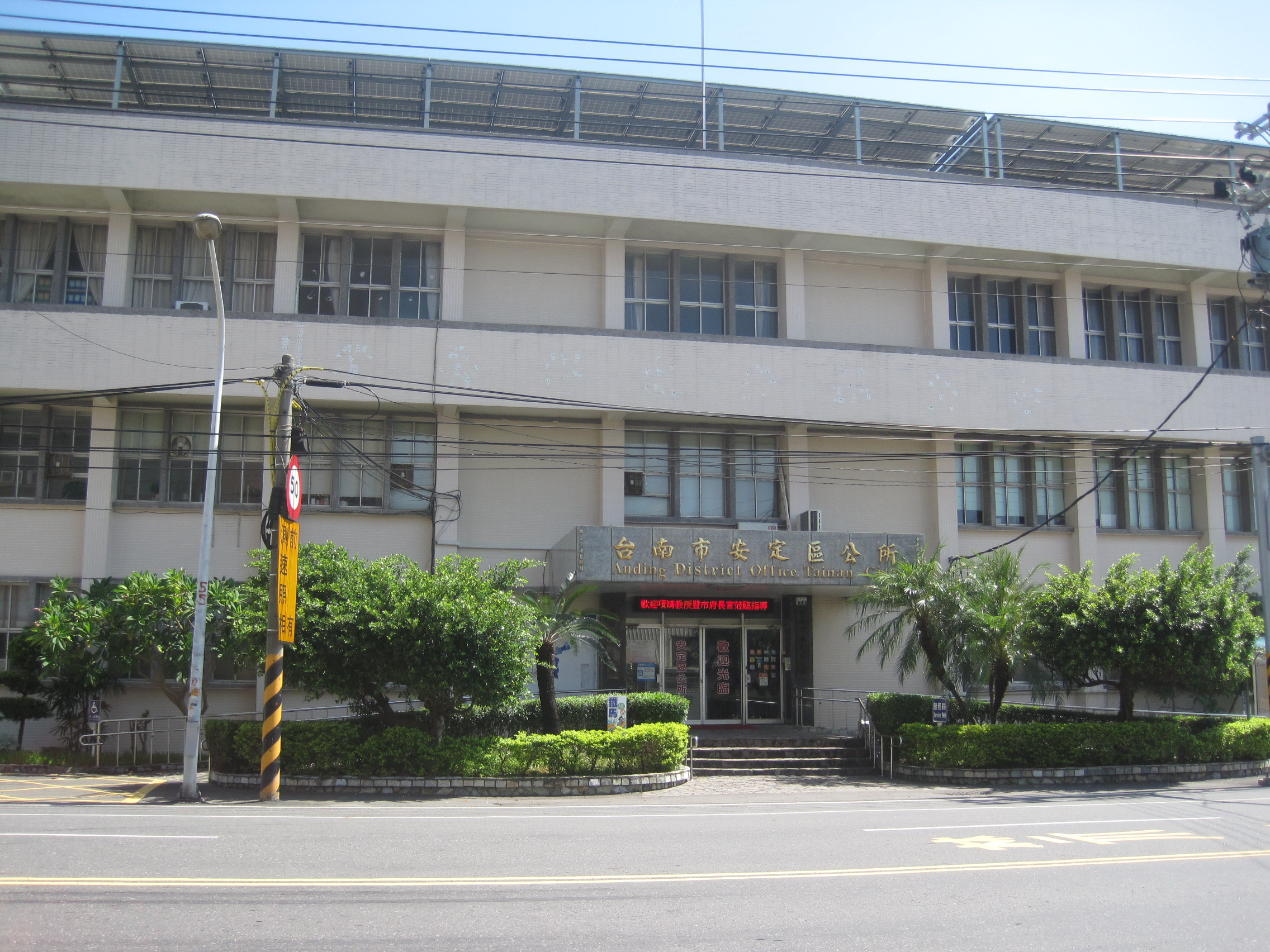
Anding District office

Anding District (Chinese: 安定區; pinyin: Āndìng Qū; Wade–Giles: An^{1}-ting^{4} Ch'ü^{1}; Pe̍h-ōe-jī: An-tēng khu) is a rural district of about 29,914 residents in Tainan, Taiwan, with an area of 31.27 square kilometers, or 12.0734 square miles. It is the 17th most populous district in Tainan, with a population density of 959 people per square kilometer, or 2,483 people per square mile.

== History ==
During the Dutch colonial era the area was known as Bakloan or Baccloan, with a rarer spelling of Baccaluang. The village was one of four main aboriginal villages near the Dutch base of Tayouan, with around 1,500 inhabitants. It was located about 12 kilometres (7.5 mi) northeast of the Dutch base at Fort Zeelandia.

=== Republic of China ===
After the handover of Taiwan from Japan to the Republic of China in 1945, Anding was organized as a rural township of Tainan County. On 25 December 2010, Tainan County was merged with Tainan City and Anding was upgraded to a district of the city.

== Administrative divisions ==
Anding district consists of Sulin, Sucuo, Anding, Baoxi, Anjia, Gangwei, Nanan, Guanliao, Zhongrong, Gangkou, Hailiao, Datong, Liujia, Gangnan, Zhongsa and Xinji Borough.

== Tourist attractions ==
- Changsing Temple
- Little Confucius Temple

== Cited works ==
- Campbell, William (1903). "Explanatory Notes". Formosa Under the Dutch: Described from Contemporary Records, with Explanatory Notes and A Bibliography of the Island. London: Kegan Paul. LCCN 04007338.
