= Sigang District =

District in Tainan, Taiwan

Coordinates: 23.122561°N 120.203083°E

Sigang 西港區
- District
- SIGANG 臺南市西港區公所; Sigang District Office, Tainan City

- Sigang District in Tainan City
- Location: Tainan, Taiwan

Area
  - Total: 34 km^{2} (13 sq mi)

Population (January 2023)
  - Total: 24,716
  - Density: 730/km^{2} (1,900/sq mi)
- Website: sigang.tainan.gov.tw

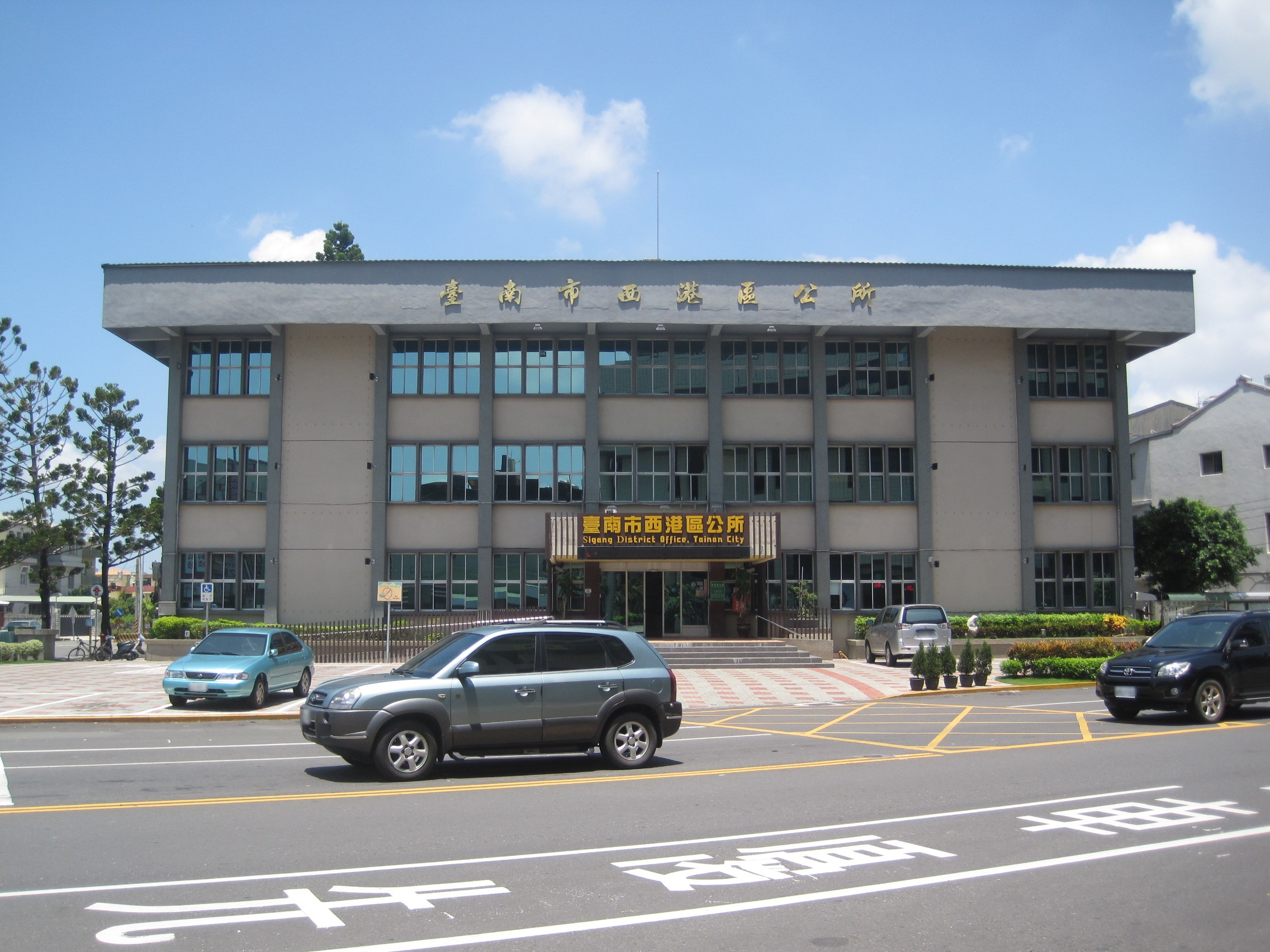
Sigang District Office

Sigang District (Chinese: 西港區; Hanyu Pinyin: Xīgǎng Qū; Tongyong Pinyin: Sigǎng Cyu; Wade–Giles: Hsi^{1}-kang^{3} Ch'ü^{1}; Pe̍h-ōe-jī: Sai-káng-khu), alternatively spelled Xigang, is a rural district of about 24,611 residents in Tainan, Taiwan. It is home to two elementary schools, one junior high school, and one high school.

== History ==
After the handover of Taiwan from Japan to the Republic of China in 1945, Sigang was organized as a rural township of Tainan County. On 25 December 2010, Tainan County was merged with Tainan City and Sigang was upgraded to a district of the city.

== Administrative divisions ==
The district consists of Xigang, Nanhai, Gangtung, Shelin, Houying, Yingxi, Jinsha, Liucuo, Zhulin, Yongle, Xinfu and Qingan Village.

== Tourist attractions ==
- Dajhong Temple
- Hubi Temple
- Temple of the Martial God

== See also ==
- Tainan
