= Effects of Typhoon Danas in Taiwan in 2025 =

Typhoon Danas
- Infrared satellite loop of Danas making landfall in Taiwan

Meteorological history
- Formed: July 4, 2025
- Dissipated: July 7, 2025

Typhoon
- 10-minute sustained (JMA)
- Highest winds: 150 km/h (90 mph)

Overall effects
- Fatalities: 9
- Damage: NT$2.9 billion
- Areas affected: Taiwan (particularly Chiayi County, Tainan, Yunlin County, and northern Taiwan)
- Part of the 2025 Pacific typhoon season

Typhoon Danas was the first typhoon of the 2025 Pacific typhoon season to make landfall in Taiwan. Danas made landfall in Budai Township, Chiayi County, and later re-emerged into the sea near the border between Taoyuan City and Hsinchu County. It was the first typhoon in 39 years since Typhoon Wayne in 1986 to make direct landfall north of Tainan while maintaining moderate typhoon intensity.

The typhoon and its subsequent rainfall caused nine direct or indirect fatalities and resulted in direct and indirect losses exceeding NT$2.9 billion.The Chiayi–Tainan region suffered exceptionally severe damage, representing the worst disaster recorded in the area's documented history. Some parts of Chiayi and Tainan experienced water outages lasting several days, while power and internet disruptions in certain areas lasted from one to two weeks, and in some cases up to a month. Along the coastal areas of Chiayi and Tainan, the roofs of a large proportion of residential buildings were blown off. Northern Tainan also announced seven consecutive days of work and school suspensions due to the extensive damage.

== Formation and preparedness measures ==
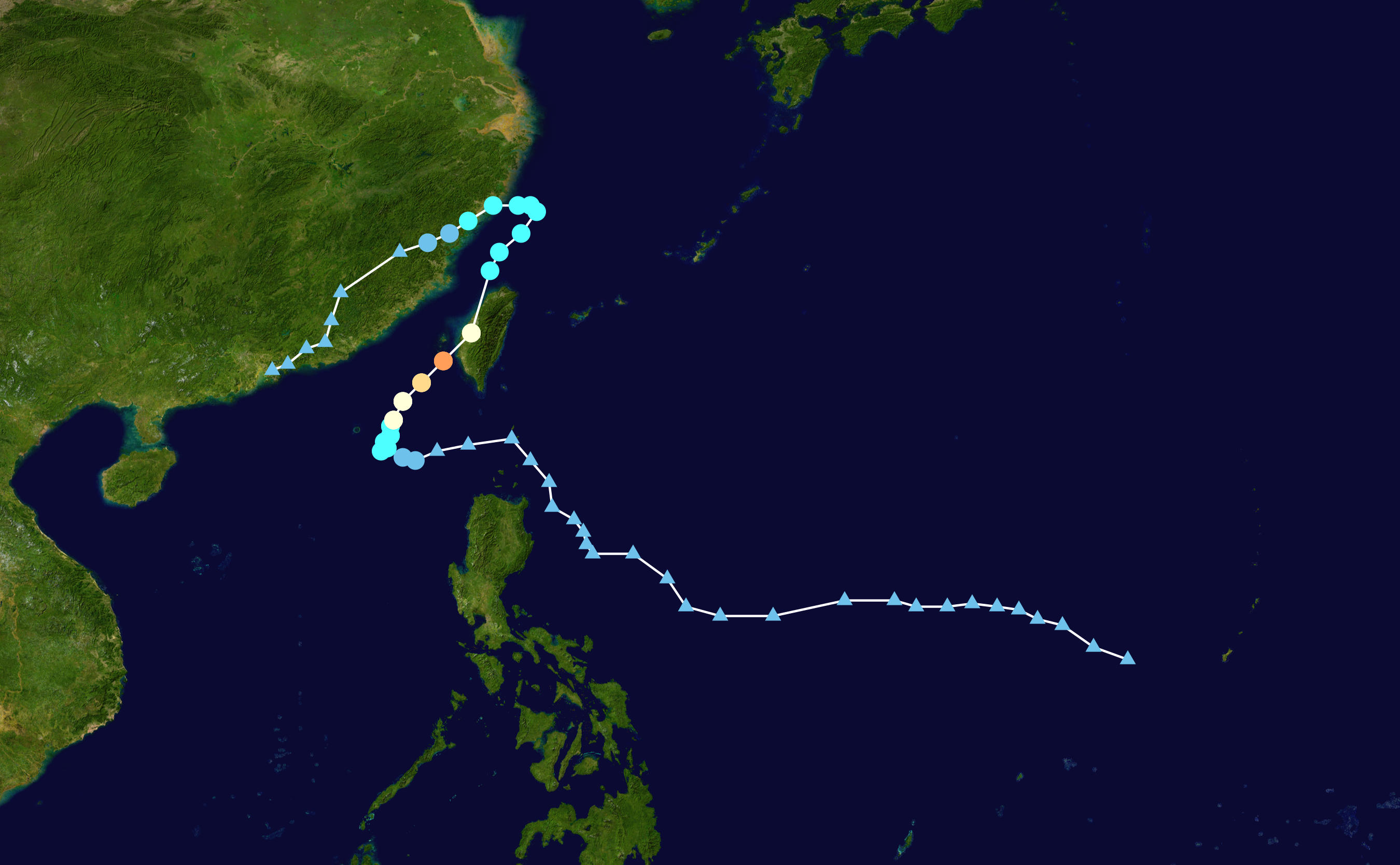
Tropical cyclone track map drawn based on the wind intensity of Hurricane Saffir-Simpson.

The intensity classifications in this section follow the standards of the Central Weather Administration of the Ministry of Transportation and Communications of the Republic of China (Taiwan), under which a “typhoon” refers to a tropical cyclone classified as a tropical storm or stronger.

After a tropical depression affected Taiwan in June, Wu Der-rong, former director of the Forecast Center of the Central Weather Bureau, stated that a tropical disturbance was expected to develop east of the Philippines in early July. He noted that forecast models showed significant uncertainty regarding the development of tropical systems, while tropical disturbances in the northwestern Pacific were expected to become more active over the following two weeks.

As Tropical Disturbance 98W formed and moved into the Bashi Channel, WeatherRisk consultant Wu Sheng-yu pointed out that land interaction was limiting its short-term intensification. However, as it gradually entered the northeastern South China Sea, conditions became more favorable for gradual strengthening.

When Disturbance 98W strengthened into a tropical depression, the Central Weather Administration warned that forecast tracks from different meteorological agencies diverged considerably. Nevertheless, influenced by moisture from the southwesterly monsoon, the system was expected to affect Taiwan regardless of its eventual track. The following day, the agency stated that if the system further developed into a typhoon, a typhoon warning would be issued directly.

The tropical depression over the northeastern South China Sea intensified into a tropical storm at 2:00 a.m. on July 5. As Danas gradually strengthened and began turning northeastward toward Taiwan, the Central Weather Administration issued a sea warning at 8:30 a.m. At that time, Danas was located approximately 390 kilometers west-southwest of Eluanbi. As the storm continued to strengthen and approach Taiwan, a land warning was issued at 8:30 p.m. the same day, when Danas was approximately 330 kilometers west-southwest of Eluanbi.

The Central Emergency Operation Center was activated at 10:00 a.m. that day. During an inspection of the center, President Lai Ching-te instructed that areas identified by the Central Weather Administration and other relevant agencies as having high rainfall totals, elevated landslide risks, or the potential to become isolated should carry out preventive evacuations to mitigate the impacts of the rapidly changing typhoon and its associated hazards.

The Hong Kong Observatory stated that the system became trapped in a col region due to the presence of a high-pressure cell over southeastern China. At the same time, the strengthening of the equatorial anticyclone near the Philippines steered the system northeastward. Benefiting from sea surface temperatures of around 29 °C and a favorable environment characterized by weak vertical wind shear, Danas gradually intensified.

Former Director of the Hong Kong Observatory Lam Chiu-ying stated that, as Danas approached Taiwan, the influence of Taiwan's terrain led to the development of a secondary circulation center. Former Director-General of the Central Weather Bureau Cheng Ming-dean likewise noted that this newly formed center and Danas were embedded within the same monsoon depression. He further pointed out that indications of such a development had appeared in some numerical weather prediction models several days earlier.

Wu Sheng-yu further noted that the newly formed circulation center was of a meteorological scale comparable to that of Danas itself. As a result, it could increase the likelihood of the storm tracking closer to land. He did not rule out the possibility that the original circulation center might dissipate after landfall and subsequently be replaced by the northern secondary center, which could then continue moving northward and rejoin the storm's original projected track. Cheng Ming-dean later stated that, after Danas made landfall in Taiwan, the original circulation center and the newly formed center underwent structural reorganization over the offshore waters northwest of Taiwan.

Wu Wan-hua, a senior specialist of the Central Weather Administration, stated that Danas approached Taiwan at its peak intensity. She further projected that beginning late on July 6, the storm would gradually weaken under the combined influence of increasing vertical wind shear and decreasing sea surface temperatures.

Danas made landfall in Budai Township, Chiayi County, at 11:40 p.m. on July 6, and re-emerged over the Taiwan Strait at approximately 6:00 a.m. the following morning near the boundary between Taoyuan City and Hsinchu County. The Central Weather Administration lifted the land warning at 11:30 a.m. that day.

As Danas gradually moved away from Taiwan, the Central Weather Administration lifted all typhoon warnings at 5:30 p.m. on July 8. However, because disaster conditions remained unresolved in several counties and cities, the Central Emergency Operation Center remained activated at the Level 2 response level.

== Preparations and impact ==
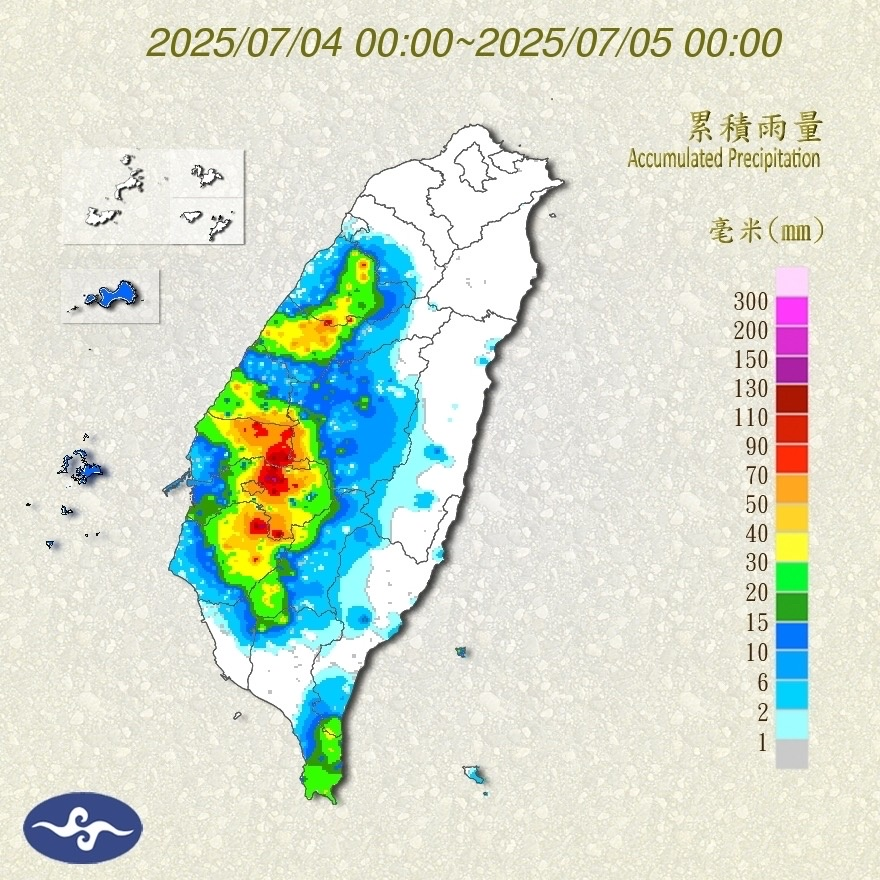
The cumulative rainfall from the outer circulation of the tropical depression passing through the waters near Taiwan on July 4–5, 2025.

=== Before landfall ===
While Danas was still a tropical depression located near the Philippines, its outer circulation began affecting Taiwan between July 4 and 5. The Central Weather Administration (CWA) of the Ministry of Transportation and Communications issued torrential rain advisories for the mountainous areas of Miaoli County, as well as Taichung City, Yunlin County, Chiayi County, Chiayi City, and Tainan City.

In Taichung City, widespread thunderstorms developed beginning at 7:00 p.m. on July 4, overwhelming drainage systems and causing extensive flooding. The Taichung City Water Resources Bureau reported that Wenxin Road received 20 mm of rainfall within ten minutes, exceeding the capacity of the drainage system. The city's Construction Bureau stated that side ditches would be widened and the density of drainage grates increased in flood-prone areas to improve runoff collection during periods of intense rainfall.

Some reports suggested that flooding in parts of Taichung was primarily caused by metal covers that had not been removed from drainage channels. In response, the Taichung City Construction Bureau clarified that the structure described in the reports as a “drainage ditch” was in fact an unfinished catch basin associated with an ongoing sidewalk improvement project. Following the flooding, the city government decided to replace 120 drainage covers, a measure that drew criticism from elected representatives across party lines, who described it as a superficial response.

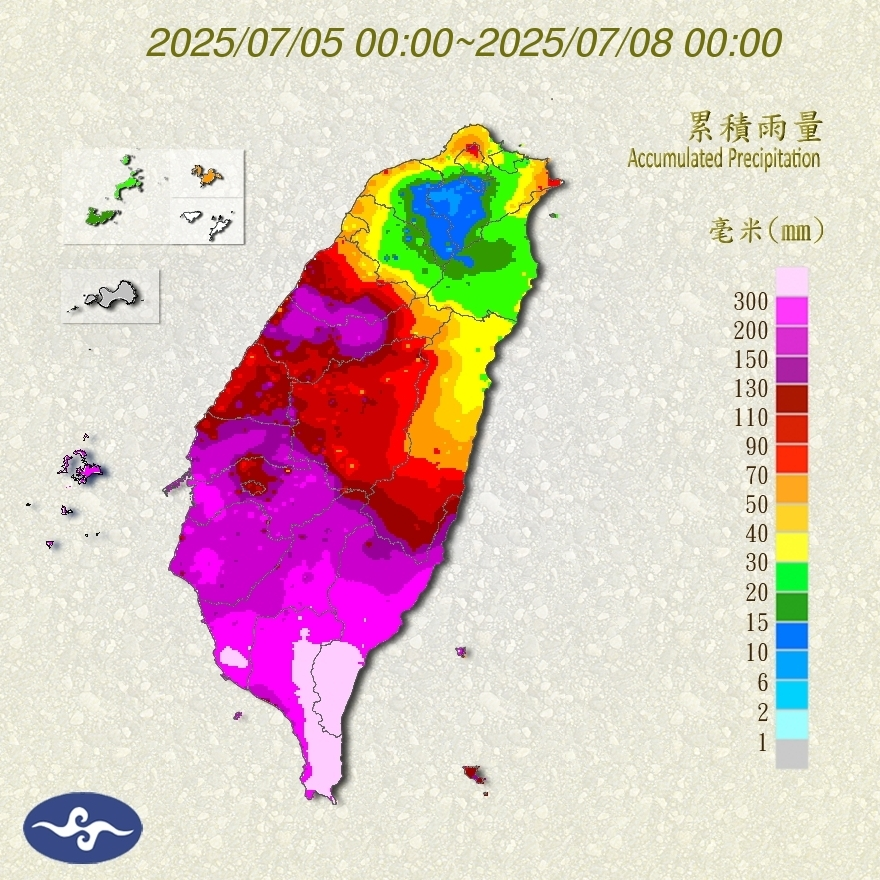
The accumulated rainfall during Typhoon Danas' passage through the waters near Taiwan from July 5th to 7th, 2025.

=== During the storm ===
Southwestern Taiwan was among the first areas affected. Local disaster response centers in the Yunlin–Chiayi–Tainan region and the Kaohsiung–Pingtung–Penghu region were activated at the highest Level 1 response status.

Under the influence of Danas, flooding and inundation affected numerous residential areas and roadways across Taiwan. At the RT-Mart Jiali Store in Tainan, a rooftop billboard collapsed after being struck by Force 14 gusts.

As the center of Danas approached Penghu and Qigu District in Tainan, Force 16 gusts were recorded. After the storm made landfall in Budai Township, Chiayi County, Force 17 gusts were observed in Kouhu Township, Yunlin County, while the landfall location itself recorded Force 14 gusts. Between July 5 and the afternoon of July 7, cumulative rainfall totals reached 643 mm in Mudan Township, Pingtung County; 580.5 mm at the Daren Forest Station in Taitung County; 391 mm in Daliao District, Kaohsiung City; and more than 290 mm in Qimei Township, Penghu County.

In terms of cultural heritage sites, the entrance archway of the Nankunshen Daitian Temple, which had stood for approximately 40 years, collapsed due to the storm's strong winds. At the Tainan Mountain Garden Waterway Museum, more than 130 trees were either completely uprooted or partially toppled, including Japanese yew plum pines planted during the Japanese colonial period. Approximately 32 trees at the Longtian Cultural Park were toppled or tilted, while several large trees also fell in Feiyan New Village.

Among historic and cultural properties, damage was particularly evident at the Deji Trading Company building, the Soulangh Cultural Park, and the Anping Studio complex. At Deji Trading Company, roof tiles were blown off, water leaked into the second floor, and windows were shattered. Soulangh Cultural Park suffered a complete power outage and damage to portions of its roofing. The Anping Studio complex sustained more extensive damage, including a site-wide power outage, collapse of a side gate due to strong winds, partial wall failures, and damage to filming facilities. Chiayi Park in Chiayi City also sustained severe damage.

In rail transportation, services on both the Taiwan High Speed Rail and Taiwan Railways Administration experienced delays due to adverse weather conditions. The Alishan Forest Railway suspended operations during the passage of Danas.

In aviation, the Civil Aviation Administration reported that 22 domestic flights were cancelled and four were delayed on July 6. On the following day, a total of 177 domestic, international, and cross-strait flights were cancelled. Civilian and military aircraft were subsequently deployed to assist with the restoration of domestic air services and passenger transportation.

Maritime transportation was also affected. The Dongliu ferry route between Pingtung and Xiaoliuqiu was suspended from July 6 to 7. All Mini Three Links ferry routes were suspended on July 6, while the Kinmen–Quanzhou route remained completely suspended on July 7. During the typhoon, a moored yacht capsized and sank in Xingda Harbor.

Several fatalities were reported during Danas. At 9:00 p.m. on July 6, a single-vehicle accident occurred at the 378.7-kilometer northbound section of National Freeway No. 3, resulting in the driver being ejected from the vehicle and killed.

On July 7, two deaths were reported in Tainan City. One individual died after a ventilator ceased functioning due to a power outage, while another person was killed by a fallen roadside tree. In Budai Township, Chiayi County, a traffic accident occurred when an elderly man in his eighties was driving with his two daughters on County Road 13. Strong winds overturned the vehicle, resulting in the death of one of his daughters.

In Xinda Village, Xuejia District, Tainan City, a married couple was struck by an iron gate from their home. Both sustained serious injuries, but communication services were disrupted, preventing them from calling an ambulance and delaying medical treatment. One of the victims later died as a result of the injuries.

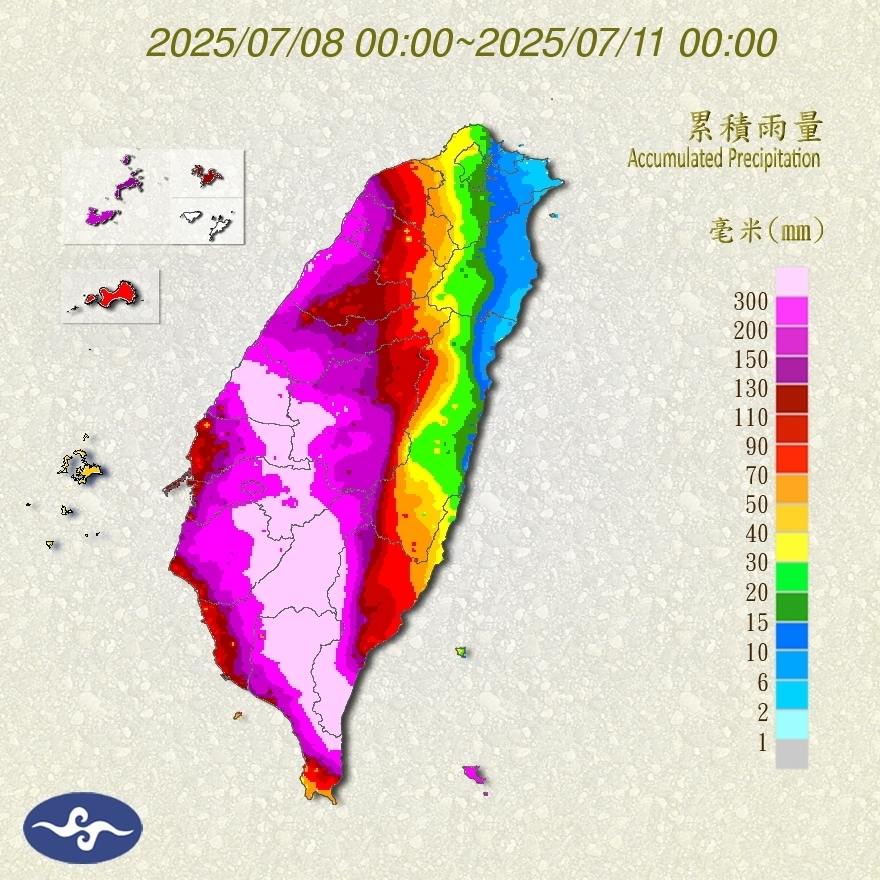
The accumulated rainfall in the waters near Taiwan from July 8 to 10, 2025, due to the remnants of the low-pressure system Danas and the southwest monsoon.

=== Subsequent heavy rainfall ===
After Danas moved away from Taiwan, its track enhanced southwesterly winds, transporting additional moisture over Taiwan. The Central Weather Administration (CWA) issued land strong wind advisories and heavy rain advisories for multiple regions, while a torrential rain advisory was specifically issued for the mountainous areas of Pingtung County.

On the morning of July 8, Cheng Ming-dean, former Director-General of the Central Weather Bureau, reported the observation of a supercell-like convective system over the offshore area between Changhua City and Taichung City. Subsequently, CWA forecaster Chang Cheng-chuan stated that torrential rain advisories had been expanded to cover areas experiencing particularly intense rainfall.

As a result of the persistent heavy rainfall, widespread flooding and inundation occurred in multiple townships of Changhua County. Along the Western Trunk Line railway, the section between Ershui in Changhua County and Linnei in Yunlin County suffered severe erosion of the railbed caused by torrential rain, resulting in a suspension of services from 2:25 p.m. to 5:28 p.m. As of 8:00 p.m. on July 8, cumulative rainfall totals reached 349.5 mm in Fuxing Township, 308 mm in Lukang Township, and 302.5 mm in Yongjing Township, all in Changhua County. Yongjing additionally recorded an hourly rainfall total of 153 mm. According to statistics compiled by WeatherRisk Explore Inc., more than 30,000 lightning strikes were recorded over Changhua between 10:00 a.m. and noon on July 8, including over 5,800 cloud-to-ground and visually observable lightning strikes.

Although Danas made landfall in Zhejiang and weakened into a low-pressure area over Fujian, intense convection continued to develop within the outer circulation of the storm's remnant system over the Taiwan Strait. Squall lines repeatedly formed along the coastlines of Taoyuan, Hsinchu, and Miaoli, as well as offshore areas of Taichung and Changhua, continuing to affect Taiwan.

During this period, the Fourth River Management Branch of the Water Resources Agency under the Ministry of Economic Affairs discovered that a landslide dam had formed along the Caoling section of the Qingshui River on the border between Yunlin and Nantou counties.

Due to the continued rainfall, the Central Weather Administration activated its “Large-Scale or Extreme Heavy Rain Operations” protocol at 5:00 p.m. on July 9, which remained in effect until 5:00 p.m. the following day.

Because the remnant low-pressure system of Danas was positioned farther southwest than originally forecast, large amounts of southwesterly flow were drawn into Taiwan, creating an atmospheric environment with sufficient moisture to generate widespread rainfall. Between midnight and 1:30 p.m. on July 10, cumulative rainfall reached 451.5 mm at Shanzhuku in Dawu Township, Taitung County, while 421 mm was recorded in Majia Township, Pingtung County during the same period.

The South-Link Highway experienced multiple landslides and flooding incidents due to the heavy rainfall. Mudflows were also reported in Shalu, Longjing, and Daya districts of Taichung during the rain event. Numerous landslides, flooding, and inundation incidents likewise occurred throughout the Taoyuan–Hsinchu–Miaoli region.

The Central Weather Administration reported that during the period dominated by the low-pressure trough, residents in the Kaohsiung–Pingtung region observed a tornado. Based on radar-derived vortex data, forecaster Wang Chien-tang conducted a preliminary analysis of the tornado's path. The tornado was determined to have formed over waters near Xiaoliuqiu, weakened temporarily as it approached the Kaohsiung coastline, and ultimately made landfall near the Kaohsiung–Pingtung boundary.

Following the event, Professor Liu Ching-huang of the Department of Atmospheric Sciences at Chinese Culture University conducted a field survey along the radar-indicated track and found only minor damage at several locations.

After rainfall gradually subsided, an 81-year-old man surnamed Chen in Chiayi County returned to inspect his ancestral brick residence due to concerns about its condition. While conducting repairs alone, he became unwell and fell. He was transported to a hospital but later died.

In Tainan City, an 88-year-old woman surnamed Wu accidentally started a fire while using candles during a prolonged power outage. Unable to escape in time, she became trapped and died in the blaze. Wu's son, surnamed Huang, later stated that firefighters presented him with a fire alarm and asked him to pose with a poster explaining fire prevention measures. A local village chief intervened, ordering the firefighters to leave and criticizing the action, saying, “Isn't it absurd to give a fire alarm to someone whose house has just burned down?”

On July 16, a 60-year-old man living in Xiaying Village, Jiali District, Tainan City, fell from a rooftop while attempting to cover a section of roof that had been blown away by Danas with a tarp. He later died from his injuries.

== Disaster relief efforts ==
The Kuomintang caucus of the Tainan City Council criticized the government's disaster response following the departure of Danas, arguing that inadequate relief efforts left affected areas without electricity for more than 100 hours. On July 14, the Central Emergency Operation Center refuted the accusation, stating that rescue and recovery personnel had been unable to provide timely progress updates to the public due to the workload and time pressure associated with restoration efforts, which had led to distorted interpretations and malicious criticism.

The Center further clarified that, as of July 13, the central government had cumulatively deployed 3,885 military personnel; 844 personnel mobilized by the Ministry of Environment from municipal and county governments; and 1,843 personnel mobilized by the Ministry of the Interior from municipal and county governments. A total of 2,477 pieces of post-disaster recovery equipment and vehicles were dispatched, including chainsaws, loaders, cranes, grapple trucks, excavators, hand tools, and cargo trucks. In addition, 28 mobile base-station vehicles and 27 satellite base-station vehicles were deployed. Taiwan Power Company (Taipower) mobilized 30,854 personnel deployments, 13,234 vehicle deployments, and 6,753 equipment deployments. Civilian resources were also mobilized, including 3,906 disaster prevention volunteers, 6,310 personnel from 384 resilient communities, 1,386 personnel from 133 Taiwan Community Emergency Response Teams, 2,270 volunteer firefighters from 284 units, 425 personnel from 61 disaster prevention organizations and volunteer groups, 471 alternative service personnel, and 2,574 volunteers from the Tzu Chi Foundation. Furthermore, for the first time, 1,350 alternative service recruits who had not yet completed basic training at Chenggongling were dispatched to disaster-stricken areas to assist with relief operations.

Former Minister of the Interior Lee Hong-yuan, during a media interview on July 14, again criticized civil servants for remaining silent, legislators for being absent, and the media for failing in its responsibilities, while also accusing government officials of not conducting disaster inspections. The Central Emergency Operation Center rejected these claims, stating that it had been activated in advance on the morning of July 5 and had operated continuously around the clock with personnel from various ministries and agencies stationed on-site.

During post-disaster power restoration work in Guishe Village, Budai Township, Chiayi County, Taiwan Power Company crews encountered resistance from local residents who blocked utility vehicles and demanded repairs to privately installed utility poles. This led to disputes between residents and workers, who were prioritizing repairs to Taipower-owned infrastructure.

On July 15, a 36-year-old Taipower employee surnamed Lee from the transmission line division suffered a severe electric shock while conducting repair work. He lost vital signs at the scene and was transported to Chi Mei Medical Center’s Liuying Branch, where extracorporeal membrane oxygenation (ECMO) was initiated. After showing no signs of improvement, Lee’s family decided on the evening of July 21 to discontinue life-support treatment and donate his organs.

In recognition of the efforts of Taipower repair crews, some members of the public voluntarily paid NT$2,000 for meals for workers dispatched from Xinying. A branch of the tea chain Tea's Original Flavor in Shuishang Township, Chiayi County, also announced that all personnel wearing Taipower uniforms or operating official Taipower disaster-relief vehicles would receive unlimited complimentary beverages.

As of July 10, the Tzu Chi Foundation had provided 7,470 hot meals in Chiayi County and Chiayi City and 6,257 hot meals in Tainan City, while also initiating assistance programs for affected households. Dalin Tzu Chi Hospital organized medical teams to provide free clinics after the typhoon had passed. World Vision Taiwan likewise launched emergency relief operations immediately after the disaster, contacting families and children receiving its services to confirm their safety and providing supplies to severely affected households.

The Red Cross Society of the Republic of China activated its emergency response mechanism after the disaster, establishing 14 emergency shelters in Annan, Madou, Guantian, Xuejia, Dongshan, Qigu, Xinying, and other areas to accommodate displaced residents. The organization also cooperated with the Volunteer Services Division of the Kaohsiung City Fire Department in post-disaster recovery operations.

The Ministry of Labor launched a temporary employment program for natural disaster recovery, providing short-term job opportunities to unemployed individuals willing to participate in reconstruction efforts within affected communities.

On July 15, Chunghwa Telecom, Far EasTone Telecommunications, and Taiwan Mobile each announced that more than 90 percent of telecommunications infrastructure repairs had been completed. During restoration work, they also deployed OneWeb mobile communications vehicles to support telecommunications services.

The Ministry of Digital Affairs explained that telecommunications service vehicles other than OneWeb mobile units could not effectively provide communications services in disaster zones due to widespread power outages and base station failures caused by disruptions to the electrical grid. The Ministry further noted that highly resilient mobile base stations capable of operating independently for three days had previously faced public opposition and removal during the aftermath of Typhoon Morakot in 2009. Consequently, strengthening the deployment of disaster-resistant base stations in rural areas or placing fiber-optic networks underground remains a matter involving significant cost considerations.

During cleanup operations, more than 10,000 trees were reported to have fallen in Chiayi City. The Chiayi City Government collected and stored the fallen trees on a vacant lot along Xinsheng Road, with plans to repurpose them as fuel.

In Tainan City, cleanup teams from the Environmental Protection Bureau of Changhua County and sanitation crews from eleven townships and cities assisted in post-disaster recovery efforts, removing approximately 500,000 kilograms of debris and helping complete waste transportation and disposal operations.

== Post-disaster assessment ==
The Ministry of Education of the Republic of China (Taiwan) initially estimated on July 9 that damage to educational facilities amounted to approximately NT$260 million. Emergency funding mechanisms were activated for severely affected jurisdictions, including Chiayi County and Tainan City, to facilitate the prompt restoration of educational activities.

According to the Ministry of Agriculture, as of 5:00 p.m. on July 18, agricultural losses caused by Typhoon Danas and its subsequent rainfall events were estimated at approximately NT$3.25538 billion.

Taiwan Power Company (Taipower) reported that Danas caused power outages affecting nearly one million households and resulted in the collapse of 2,454 utility poles. Subsequent damage assessments and repair operations later increased the number of collapsed utility poles to 3,499. Taiwan Water Corporation reported that at the peak of the disaster, water service disruptions affected 73,487 households.

The typhoon also damaged approximately 145,000 solar panels installed at detention ponds and aquaculture ponds in Tainan. Water quality tests conducted by the Ministry of Environment detected ten heavy metals, including lead, arsenic, and copper; however, the results indicated no measurable environmental impact.

According to statistics from the National Communications Commission (NCC), Danas damaged 1,322 telecommunications base stations throughout Taiwan. In addition, more than 2,800 fiber-optic cables were damaged because portions of telecommunications infrastructure were attached to Taipower utility poles.

On August 6, the Directorate-General of Budget, Accounting and Statistics announced that Taiwan's Consumer Price Index (CPI) for July increased by 1.54 percent year-on-year, representing a slight increase from June. The rise was primarily attributed to higher vegetable prices caused by Typhoon Danas and subsequent heavy rainfall, as well as increases in meat and dining-out prices.

== Related events ==
=== Professional controversies ===
==== Solar photovoltaic panel controversy ====
Following the passage of Danas, Legislator Lo Ting-wei alleged that offshore solar power facilities in Jiadong Township, Pingtung County, had been destroyed and that solar panels had washed ashore.

The Ministry of Economic Affairs refuted the claim, explaining that the objects that had drifted ashore were experimental floating photovoltaic platforms designed to test the ability of floating structures to withstand typhoon conditions.

Subsequently, the Ministry spent four consecutive days addressing public concerns regarding the solar panel controversy. The Energy Administration stated that if sensationalized misinformation or false reports continued to generate substantial public misunderstanding, the matter would be reported to the police.

The independent media outlet News & Market argued that the controversy involved matters of public interest and that the Ministry of Economic Affairs should not act as both the subject of scrutiny and the source of oversight, while also criticizing the Ministry for declining to answer reporters' questions.

Legislator Huang Kuo-chang further stated that he had requested access to proposal documents and approved project plans from the Ministry of Economic Affairs but was denied access after the Ministry indicated that it would first consult with the relevant companies.

==== Taipower worker staging controversy ====
On July 16, the Taiwan Power Labor Union, the Taipower Xinying District Enterprise Union, the Taipower Kaohsiung District Enterprise Union, and the Taipower Taitung District Enterprise Union jointly issued a statement alleging that while repair crews were working overtime, Taipower and certain news media outlets arranged staged photographs during work and meal breaks in order to produce promotional materials supporting proposed government subsidies for Taipower.

Taipower and the Ministry of Economic Affairs denied the allegations, stating that only on rare occasions had media personnel requested workers to briefly cooperate with filming for operational needs.

The Taiwan Electrical Workers Union countered that the Taiwan Power Labor Union lacked sufficient representativeness and was spreading misleading information.

On July 17, Legislator Chang Chi-kai further alleged that the claims of staged photography originated from internal Taipower documents and had been requested by senior management.

During questioning in the Legislative Yuan's Social Welfare and Environmental Hygiene Committee, Minister of Labor Hung Sun-han responded to inquiries from Legislator Tu Chuan-chi by stating that whether the incidents constituted staged photography or involved any violations should be considered from the perspective of frontline employees and that greater respect and support should be provided to those workers.

=== Disaster inspection controversies ===
==== Political remarks ====
Between July 4 and 5, Taichung Mayor Lu Shiow-yen participated in public events opposing the nationwide recall campaigns. Several Democratic Progressive Party members of the Taichung City Council subsequently questioned her disaster preparedness efforts.

Lu later renewed her criticism of President Lai Ching-te during a Kuomintang-organized rally titled Oppose Malicious Recalls, Fight for the Economy on July 12, stating, “People in Taichung are still helping with disaster relief for you,” which again sparked public debate.

Following the disaster, Legislator Chen Ting-fei publicly questioned Taiwan Power Company regarding the timeline for restoring electricity. After facing criticism, she deleted the post. Democratic Progressive Party Legislative Yuan caucus secretary-general Wu Szu-yao and fellow legislator Lin Chun-hsien defended Chen, arguing that she was merely expressing the expectations of local residents for a rapid restoration of power.

Chen later stated that her remarks had been misunderstood and affirmed that she would “always stand with Taipower.

President Lai Ching-te made multiple visits to Tainan alongside Mayor Huang Wei-che to inspect disaster-affected areas. Residents in the northern part of Tainan criticized the government's relief efforts, with one resident complaining, “It's already been more than thirty hours and nobody has come to care. Only when you arrived did anyone pay attention. What is this government doing?”

During a disaster inspection on July 11, Lai's response to residents' complaints that “not everything can rely on the military” generated controversy. Presidential Office spokesperson Karen Kuo later clarified that Lai's remark referred to legal restrictions preventing the Republic of China Armed Forces from entering private residences without authorization and was not intended as an attempt to evade responsibility.

Lai and Huang publicly apologized on the sixth day after the disaster for the prolonged water and electricity outages. However, some residents criticized the visits, alleging that their complaints were repeatedly interrupted during the inspection process.

During one of Lai's visits, residents reported that mobile communications services remained unavailable. Lai responded by noting that Legislator Kuo Kuo-wen's phone still had a signal. Portions of the exchange were later circulated by an online media outlet, which accused Lai of failing to respond to residents' concerns. The Presidential Office subsequently released the full transcript, which showed that Lai had instructed the National Fire Agency to coordinate assistance. Presidential Office spokesperson Karen Kuo accused the media outlet of quoting remarks out of context and disregarding the facts.

=== Taiwan People's Party relief controversy ===
The Taiwan People's Party organized relief activities following the disaster. However, some affected residents alleged that volunteers required recipients to provide fingerprints and body measurements when distributing relief supplies. The party denied collecting excessive personal information, explaining that body measurements were requested because a supplier had donated new underwear free of charge and that registration was only intended to facilitate inventory control.

The Tainan City chapter of the Taiwan People's Party visited affected communities and used the opportunity to criticize the government's response. Some local residents expressed dissatisfaction, stating that the party's claim that “nobody had come to care” was inaccurate and demanding that related videos be removed.

=== Post-disaster misinformation ===
During the typhoon, rumors circulated online claiming that farmed fish in central and southern Taiwan would ingest toxic substances leaking from damaged solar panels. According to experts in aquaculture and photovoltaic technology, most modern solar panels are composed primarily of silicon and are non-toxic. For freshwater fish ponds, photovoltaic panels pose virtually no pollution or toxicity risks. However, if solar panels floating in saltwater fish ponds or marine environments are not recovered for extended periods, corrosion-related risks may arise.

Wang Min-cheng, deputy director of the West District branch of the Taiwan People's Party's Chiayi City chapter, posted on Threads claiming that President Lai Ching-te had been enthusiastically welcomed with singing and dancing during a visit to Chi Mei Medical Center's Liuying Branch. A fact-check conducted by the Taiwan FactCheck Center determined that the event was a regularly scheduled concert held by the hospital and was unrelated to the President's visit.

Northern Tainan suffered extensive damage, and several areas suspended work and classes for five consecutive days while residents repaired their homes. However, former New Power Party chairperson Chen Chiao-hua claimed on Facebook that Tainan City government employees had also been given leave and did not return to work until the following week after the disaster. The Tainan City Government subsequently filed a lawsuit against Chen over the statement.
