= Lee Chun-yee =

Taiwanese politician (born 1959)

Lee Chun-yee MLY
- 李俊毅
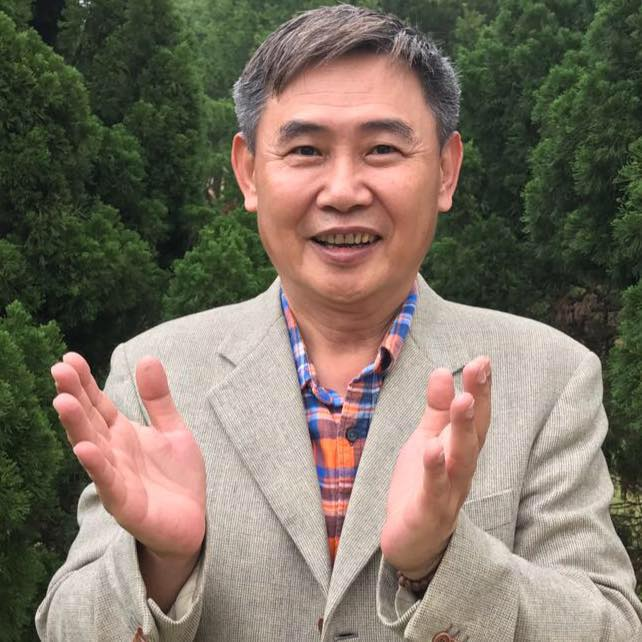

Member of the Legislative Yuan
- In office 1 February 1996 – 31 January 2012
- Succeeded by: Mark Chen
- Constituency: Tainan County (until 2008); Tainan County 3rd (2008–2010); Tainan 5th (2010–2012)

Personal details
- Born: 20 March 1959 (age 67) Tainan County, Taiwan
- Party: Democratic Progressive Party
- Education: National Chengchi University (BA, MPA)

Lee Chun-yee (Chinese: 李俊毅; born 20 March 1959) is a Taiwanese politician. A member of the Democratic Progressive Party, he served in the Legislative Yuan from 1996 to 2012 as a representative of Tainan.

== Early life and education ==
Lee was born in Tainan County in 1959. He earned a bachelor's degree in public administration from National Chengchi University and then earned a master's degree in public administration from the university.

== Political career ==
Lee represented Tainan County as a member of the Legislative Yuan from 1996 to 2012. Affiliated with the Democratic Progressive Party's Welfare State Alliance, he has also served as the DPP caucus whip. In 2009, Lee was named the Democratic Progressive Party candidate for the Tainan County magistracy. The election was cancelled, as both Tainan City and Tainan County were consolidated into the special municipality of Tainan the next year. Subsequently, Lee declared his candidacy for the mayoralty of Tainan, and he was challenged by Yeh Yi-jin, Su Huan-chih, and Hsu Tain-tsair. A fifth Democratic Progressive Party candidate, William Lai, later received official party support and won the office. Lee lost to Wang Ting-yu in a contentious 2011 party primary and eventually yielded his legislative seat to Wang's replacement candidate Mark Chen. Su Tseng-chang named Lee one of three deputy secretaries-general of the Democratic Progressive Party in 2012. Lee resigned from the position in 2017 to prepare his second campaign for the Tainan mayoralty. He was one of six candidates vying for the DPP mayoral nomination won by Huang Wei-cher.

== Controversy ==
Lee was accused of accepting bribes in 2007, charges that originally stemmed from 1998. In 2010, the Taiwan High Court sentenced Lee to seven years and six months imprisonment. Two years later, he was cleared of corruption.
