= List of county magistrates of Tainan =

This is a list of magistrates of Tainan County:

Kuomintang Democratic Progressive Party

#	Name	Office	Term
1	Kao Wen-jui (高文瑞)	1951 – 1957	1
1	Kao Wen-jui (高文瑞)	1951 – 1957	2
2	Hu Lung-pao (胡龍寶)	1957 – 1964	3
2	Hu Lung-pao (胡龍寶)	1957 – 1964	4
3	Liou Po-wen (劉博文)	1964 – 1972	5
4	Chin Lu (金輅)	1972 as acting	6
5	Kao Yu-jen (高育仁)	1 February 1973 – 9 July 1976	7
6	Lee Ti-yuan (李悌元)	10 July 1976 – 20 December 1977 as acting	7
7	Yang Pao-fa (楊寶發)	20 December 1977 – 20 December 1985	8
7	Yang Pao-fa (楊寶發)	20 December 1977 – 20 December 1985	9
8	Lee Ya-chiao (李雅樵)	20 December 1985 – 20 December 1993	10
8	Lee Ya-chiao (李雅樵)	20 December 1985 – 20 December 1993	11
9	Mark Chen (陳唐山)	20 December 1993 – 20 December 2001	12
9	Mark Chen (陳唐山)	20 December 1993 – 20 December 2001	13
10	Su Huan-chih (蘇煥智)	20 December 2001 – 25 December 2010	14
10	Su Huan-chih (蘇煥智)	20 December 2001 – 25 December 2010	15

On 25 December 2010, the county merged with Tainan City to form a larger single special municipality.

== See also ==
- Mayor of Tainan
