= Qigu =

Qigu may refer to the following:

- Cigu, Tainan, district in Taiwan.
- Qigu Formation, geologic formation in Xinjiang, China
