= Kao Su-po =

Taiwanese legal scholar and politician

- 高思博
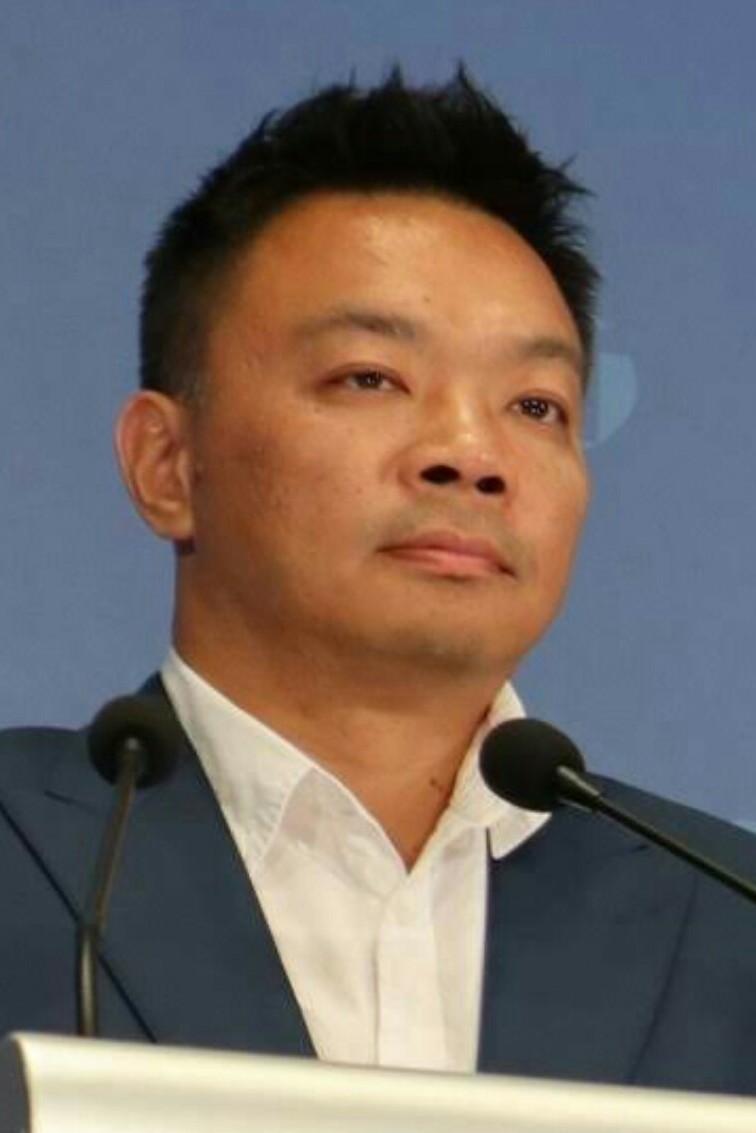

Minister of Mongolian and Tibetan Affairs Commission of the Republic of China
- In office 20 May 2008 – 8 February 2011
- Preceded by: Hsu Chih-hsiung
- Succeeded by: Luo Ying-shay

Member of the Legislative Yuan
- In office 1 February 2005 – 31 January 2008
- Constituency: Tainan

Personal details
- Born: 31 October 1968 (age 57) Tainan, Taiwan
- Party: Kuomintang (since 2006)
- Other political affiliations: People First Party (until 2006)
- Parent: Kao Yu-jen (father)
- Education: National Taiwan University (LLB); George Washington University (JD, SJD)

Kao Su-po (Chinese: 高思博; pinyin: Gāo Sībó; born 31 October 1968) is a Taiwanese legal scholar and politician. He was a member of the Legislative Yuan from 2005 to 2008, and led the Mongolian and Tibetan Affairs Commission between 2008 and 2011. He contested the Tainan mayoralty in 2018, losing the office to Huang Wei-cher.

== Early life and education ==
Kao Su-po was born in Zhongxi District, Tainan, on October 31, 1968. His ancestral home is in Jiali. His father, Kao Yu-jen, owned a law firm in his hometown and was the former Taiwan Provincial Assembly speaker and Tainan County commissioner from 1973 to 1976.

After the graduating from the Affiliated Senior High School of National Taiwan Normal University, Kao studied law at National Taiwan University, graduating with an LL.B. in 1990. He then pursued doctoral studies in the United States at George Washington University, where he earned a J.D. and his Doctor of Juridical Science (S.J.D.) in 1998 from the George Washington University Law School. His doctoral dissertation was titled, "Knowledge and authority: A study of the legitimacy of modern jurisprudence". As a graduate student in Washington, D.C., Kao interned at Capitol Hill.

== Academic career ==
After receiving his doctorate, Kao became an associate professor and the director in the Law Departments at Central Police University and Shih Hsin University respectively.

== Political career ==
Kao contested the 2004 legislative elections as a People First Party candidate. He took office in February 2005 and joined the Kuomintang one year later. He was named minister without portfolio and head of the Mongolian and Tibetan Affairs Commission in May 2008. He resigned from both posts in January 2011.

=== Mongolian and Tibetan Affairs Commission ===
In February 2010, Kao said that the MTAC was making a policy change from increasing Taiwan's relations with Mongolia and Central Tibetan Administration to promote cross-strait relations. Additionally, he saw a possible merger of MTAC into the Mainland Affairs Council as a way to help MTAC “find a proper place when dealing with Mongolian and Tibetan affairs.”

=== 2018 Tainan mayoral elections ===
Kao ran and won against Huang Hsiu-shuang, former president of the National University of Tainan during the KMT primary elections in May 2018. As the KMT mayoral candidate for Tainan, Kao's campaign addressed three main policy areas: 1) reversing and reimbursing Tainan residents for the increase in housing taxes; 2) making health insurance free for the elderly ages 65 and above and improving public daycare centers; and 3) preserving Tainan's heritage by preventing the demolition of old buildings for the railway expansion. Additionally, Kao sought to revive and expand industries in Tainan, such as reopening China's contract with milk fish farmers in Syuejia District of Tainan and giving local factories access to global markets.

Taking TVBS News on a tour of his childhood home on August 21, 2018, Kao explained the importance of family and maintaining the history of the ancient city. When asked by anchor Amber Chien if he agreed with critiques that KMT was outdated and full of old representatives, Kao explained that although there needs to be more youth involvement in the party, the party should not give up the integrity of KMT history and heritage because there is value in it.

The Democratic Progressive Party has been the ruling party for Tainan for over 25 years, garnering a lot of attention for the contending KMT campaign in the municipality. In the Taipei Times, Kao states: "The people of Tainan have grown so accustomed to a DPP mayor that they cannot even imagine what the city could become under a leader from a different party". Therefore, Kao hopes to not only usurp DPP's quarter of a century rule over Tainan, but also provide much needed change to its struggling economy. The DPP candidate for the mayoral election is Huang Wei-cher, a lawmaker who beat five other contenders during DPP's primaries in March 2018.

2018 Kuomintang Tainan City mayoral primary results
Candidates	Place	Result
Kao Su-po	Nominated	Results not released
Huang Hsiu-shuang	2nd	Results not released

2018 Tainan City mayoral results
No.	Candidate	Party	Votes	Percentage
1	Huang Wei-cher	Democratic Progressive Party	367,518	38.02%
2	Kao Su-po	Kuomintang	312,874	32.37%
3	Lin Yi-feng (林義豐)	Independent	84,153	8.71%
4	Hsu Chun-hsin (許忠信)	Independent	45,168	4.67%
5	Chen Yong-he (陳永和)	Independent	117,179	12.12%
6	Su Huan-chih	Independent	39,778	4.11%
Total voters			1,546,862	
Valid votes			966,670	
Invalid votes				
Voter turnout			62.49%	

== Personal life ==
Kao is married to Chou Yun-tsai, deputy director and R&D Advisor in Chief at the 21st Century Foundation, and they have one son.
