= Kao Yu-jen =

Taiwanese politician

- 高育仁

Member of the Legislative Yuan
- In office 1 February 1999 – 31 January 2005
- Constituency: Republic of China
- In office 1 February 1993 – 31 January 1999
- Constituency: Tainan

Speaker of the Taiwan Provincial Assembly
- In office 20 December 1981 – 19 December 1989
- Preceded by: Tsai Hung-wen
- Succeeded by: Chien Ming-ching (簡明景)

Vice Minister of the Interior
- In office 9 July 1976 – 22 October 1978
- Minister: Chang Feng-hsu; Chiu Chuang-huan

Tainan County Magistrate
- In office 1 February 1973 – 9 July 1976
- Preceded by: Chin Lu (acting); Liou Po-wen
- Succeeded by: Lee Ti-yuan (acting); Yang Pao-fa

Member of the Taiwan Provincial Assembly
- In office 1968–1972

Personal details
- Born: 30 August 1934 (age 91) Kari, Hokumon, Tainan Prefecture, Taiwan, Empire of Japan (today Jiali, Tainan, Taiwan)
- Party: Kuomintang
- Children: Kao Su-po
- Relatives: Eric Chu (son-in-law)
- Education: National Taiwan University (LLB)

Kao Yu-jen or Gao Yuren (Chinese: 高育仁; born 30 August 1934) is a Taiwanese politician.

== Education and personal life ==
Kao studied law at National Taiwan University. Eric Chu is married to Kao's daughter Kao Wan-ching. Kao's son Kao Su-po has served as a legislator.

== Political career ==
Kao was elected to the Taiwan Provincial Assembly in 1968, and served a single term. From 1973 to 1976, Kao was Tainan County Magistrate. He was then appointed vice minister of the interior and later served as director of civil affairs within Taiwan Provincial Government. Kao returned to the Taiwan Provincial Assembly in 1981, and became the legislative body's youngest speaker at the age of 47. He stepped down from the assembly in 1989, and failed to secure the presidential nomination for Governor of Taiwan Province, which was given to Lien Chan. Instead Kao assumed the chairmanship of China Television Company and served concurrently as adviser to president Lee Teng-hui. Kao won election to the Legislative Yuan in 1992, allied himself with the "non-mainstream faction" of the Kuomintang in opposition to Lee, and contested the speakership, losing the office to Liu Sung-pan. From 1993 to 1999, Kao represented Tainan County. He was elected to two more term via party list proportional representation, but did not often attend legislative sessions.

== Business career ==
Kao held several business interests and executive positions, including in Minyu Machinery, Shang Mao Electronics, and Paoyi Technology, Kuowei Mass Communication, Twinhead International Corporation, Vtron Technology, Greater Tainan Natural Gas Company, Euroc Venture Capital Company, Everterminal, and Tai Tung Communication Company.
