= Sun Kauo-hwa =

Taiwanese politician

Bill Sun Kauo-hwa (Chinese: 孫國華; born 11 October 1944) is a Taiwanese engineer and politician.

== Education ==
Sun earned a Bachelor of Science degree at National Taiwan University in 1966, followed by a master's degree from the University of Kentucky in 1969. His doctoral studies were completed at the University of California, Berkeley, within the department of mechanical engineering. His doctoral dissertation was titled Thermal Performance Characteristics of Heat Pipes.

== Career ==
Sun served on committees considering the topic of nuclear power, and was active in Kuomintang-affiliated overseas organizations while in the United States. He was elected to the Legislative Yuan in 2001, to represent overseas Chinese on behalf of the Kuomintang. As a legislator, Sun was part of delegations that traveled to Europe in 2003 to advocate for Taiwan's participation in the World Health Organization. He planned to make another trip to Europe in 2004, for the same reason, but decided not to go. In June 2004, Sun traveled to the United States as part of a delegation to discuss Taiwan's national defense and the potential for Taiwan to acquire military equipment from the United States. In September of that year, Sun criticized the Thai government for refusing to grant him and other Taiwanese politicians a visa, forcing him to cancel a scheduled trip there. Later that same month, Sun chastised foreign minister Mark Chen for statements Chen had made about relations with Singapore. In January 2005, Sun joined a Taiwanese delegation attending the second inauguration of American president George W. Bush.
