= Cigu =

Cigu may refer to:

- Sagittaria sagittifolia, known as cigu in China, a flowering plant
- Cigu District, in Tainan, Taiwan
