= Huang Zhixian =

Huang Zhixian (simplified Chinese: 黄志贤, 黄智贤; traditional Chinese: 黃志賢, 黃智賢; pinyin: Huáng Zhìxián) may refer to:

- Ben Wong (born 1967), Hong Kong actor
- Huang Chih-hsien (born 1964), Taiwanese commentator and author
- Huang Zhixian (politician), Chinese politician; president of the All-China Federation of Taiwan Compatriots 2017–2022
