= Twinhead =

Taiwanese computer manufacturer

- Native name: 倫飛電腦實業股份有限公司
- Type: Public
- Traded as: TWSE: 2364
- Industry: Computer hardware
- Founded: February 27, 1984; 42 years ago
- Headquarters: Neihu District, Taipei, Taiwan
- Key people: Kao Yu-jen (chairman); Fred Kao (general manager)
- Products: Rugged laptops and tablets
- Brands: Durabook
- Number of employees: 26
- Website: www.twinhead.com.tw/en/

Twinhead International Corp. (倫飛電腦實業股份有限公司), commonly known as Twinhead, is a Taiwanese computer hardware manufacturer headquartered in Neihu District, Taipei. The company manufactures rugged laptops and tablets under the Durabook brand.

Twinhead was established in February 1984 and entered the laptop market in 1991. By 2001, it was expanding its industrial- and military-use notebook operations, and it later increased its focus on industrial-grade and rugged computing.

== History ==
Twinhead was established in February 1984 as a manufacturer of personal-computer-related products. The company was co-founded by Yi-Cheng Chen, a Taiwanese computer designer. In 1991, it created its own brand and entered the laptop market.

A 2016 study of Taiwan's laptop industry attributed Twinhead's acquisition of laptop contracts from companies in the United States to its design-engineering capabilities. The study described Twinhead's own-brand notebook business as top-ranked in Taiwan during the 1990s. According to iThome reporting, Twinhead led notebook sales in Taiwan for five consecutive years from 1995 to 1999. That year, Twinhead ranked fifth in China's notebook market, the highest among Taiwanese manufacturers.

On 27 February 2001, Twinhead announced that 117 Taiwanese employees at its Kaohsiung plant would be dismissed. It also said that the contracts of 60 foreign workers would not be renewed as they expired. The company attributed the reductions to unused production capacity and efforts to lower labour costs, and denied that they were connected to its proposed merger with Uniwill Computer Corp. The proposed merger would have combined Uniwill's contract-manufacturing operations with Twinhead's own-brand business and increased production scale.

The Taiwan Fair Trade Commission approved Twinhead's application to merge with Uniwill in July 2001. Under the proposal, Twinhead would have been the surviving company and Uniwill would have been dissolved. The proposed merger did not proceed after two shareholder votes failed to receive sufficient support from Uniwill shareholders.

By July 2001, Twinhead was expanding its industrial- and military-use notebook operations. Around 2006, Twinhead extended its core business from commercial notebook computers to include industrial-grade notebooks. The industrial business used a lower-volume, higher-variety production model, compared with the mass-production model used for commercial notebooks. The transition included a nine-month overhaul of Twinhead's enterprise resource planning system, revising procurement and order-management workflows across its Taipei and Kaohsiung operations. Today, Twinhead manufactures and markets rugged laptops and tablets under the Durabook brand.

In 2026, Twinhead expanded its overseas distribution network and its rugged-computing business into ground control stations and unmanned aerial vehicle platforms.

== Business structure ==
In a 1998 interview, Twinhead described its business mix as 60 percent OEM, 30 percent own-brand business and 10 percent ODM.

The company is headquartered in Neihu District, Taipei, and is listed on the Taiwan Stock Exchange under stock code 2364. Kao Yu-jen serves as chairman, while Fred Kao serves as general manager.
