= Taiwan Salt Museum =

Museum in Qigu, Tainan, Taiwan

- 臺灣鹽博物館
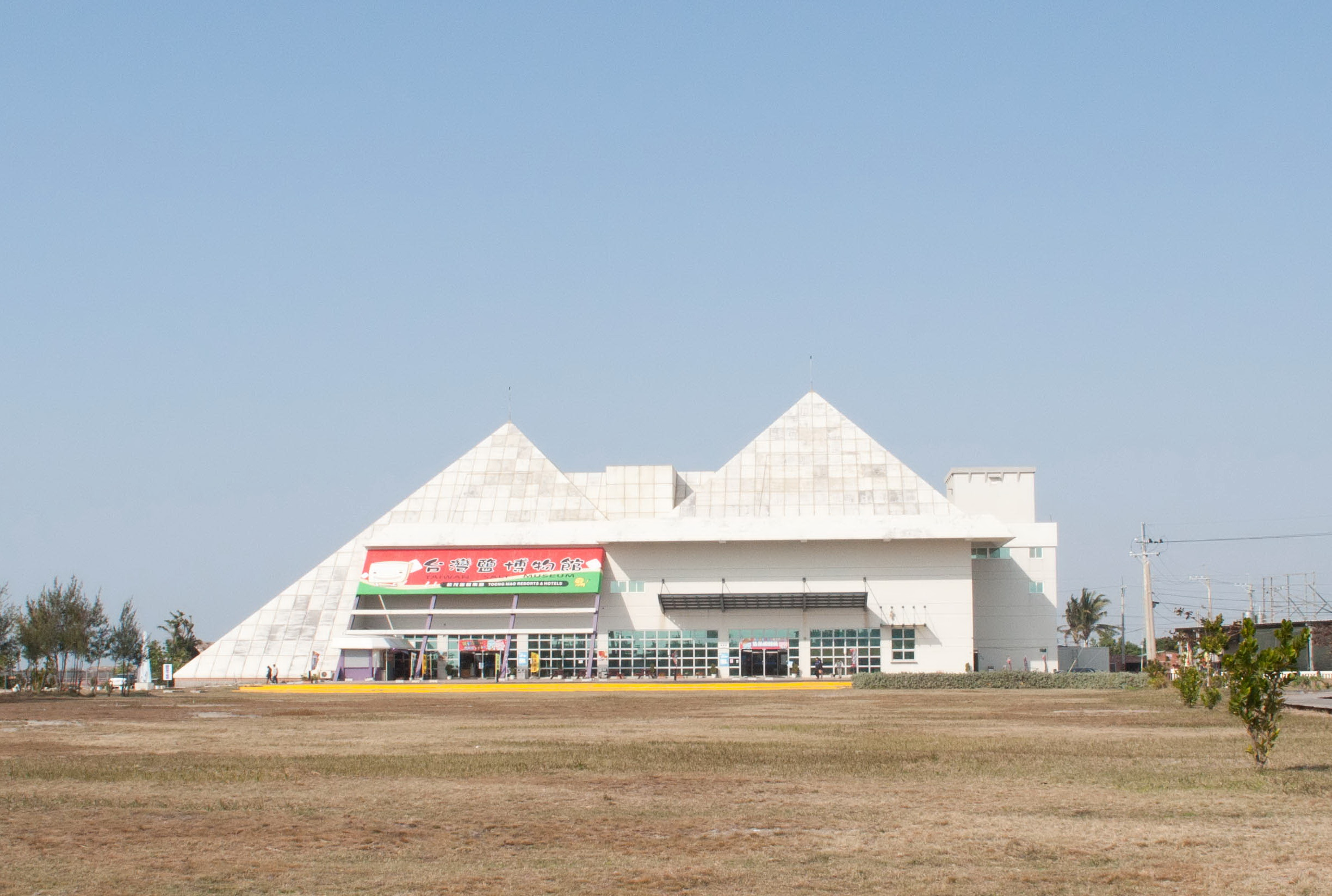
- Location: Cigu, Tainan, Taiwan
- Coordinates: 23°09′19″N 120°06′20″E
- Type: museum
- Architect: Ho Jhonghua Architect Office

The Taiwan Salt Museum (traditional Chinese: 臺灣鹽博物館; simplified Chinese: 台湾盐博物馆; pinyin: Táiwān Yán Bówùguǎn) is a museum about salt in Cigu District, Tainan, Taiwan.

== History ==
The salt mountain was once the largest sea salt field in Taiwan supplying the domestic demand. Due to the declining demand, the salt field ceased production in May 2002. After the production halt, the place was refurbished by Taiyen Company to create a unique landscape of salt mountain.

== Architecture ==
The shape and the look of the salt piles are strategically designed so that the two piles look like two white pyramids rising out of the salt field.

== Exhibitions ==
The museum displays salt-related products as well as collection of books and relics about the salt industry in Taiwan.

== Transportation ==
The museum is accessible by bus from Tainan or Xinying Station.

== See also ==
- List of museums in Taiwan
