= Yang Chi-hsiung =

Taiwanese politician

Yang Chi-hsiung MLY
- 楊吉雄

Member of the Legislative Yuan
- In office 1 February 1993 – 31 January 2002
- Constituency: Party-list

Personal details
- Born: 8 July 1943 (age 82) Suō, Suō, Taihoku Prefecture, Taiwan, Empire of Japan (today Su'ao, Yilan County, Taiwan)
- Party: Kuomintang
- Occupation: politician
- Profession: fisherman

Yang Chi-hsiung (Chinese: 楊吉雄; born 8 July 1943) is a Taiwanese politician. He was a member of the Legislative Yuan between 1993 and 2002.

== Life and career ==
Yang is a native of Yilan County, where he was a fisherman. He held board positions at Ho-shin Fishing Company and Yang's Aviation Company.

He was elected to the Legislative Yuan three times via party list proportional representation, in 1992, 1995, and 1998. On 9 December 1999, Yang began releasing financial documents relating to James Soong and Soong's son Soong Chen-yuan. What followed became known as the Chung Hsing Bills Finance scandal. Yang claimed that Soong Chen-yuan held more than NT$140 million in his Chung Hsing Bills Finance account, including NT$106 million in securities. A resulting probe revealed that Tuntex Corporation president Chen Yu-hao donated NT$100 million to James Soong in 1992, which was later transferred to his son's account. James Soong claimed that the money had been returned to Chen in June 1999, but Yang produced financial records that showed transactions on the account in question later than that date, until its recorded liquidation in October. Yang also claimed that James Soong kept NT$470 million in the bank account of Chen Pi-yuan, his sister-in-law. The case was reported to the Control Yuan for further investigation. The supervisory agency formed a task force for the case. Separately, Yang filed charges of tax evasion against James Soong. With the help of legislative colleague Chen Zau-nan, Yang added more charges, among them embezzlement, fraud, breach of trust, money laundering, and expanded the number of accused, which included James Soong, his wife, son, and sister-in-law, as well as an assistant, Yang Yun-tai. The Taipei District Prosecutors' Office announced in January 2001 that it would not pursue further legal action.

Yang was elected to the Central Standing Committee of the Kuomintang on 11 October 2009, but his party rights were suspended and committee seat were revoked upon the party's Evaluation and Disciplinary Committee concluding that Yang had committed bribery in sending fish to delegates during the election. In response to Yang's removal from the Central Standing Committee, some delegates provided evidence of gifts sent by other candidates in the committee election. Following Yang's removal, 22 members of the Central Standing Committee elected alongside Yang resigned their positions. Following the mass resignation, a by-election for vacant committee seats was held in November 2009.

In February 2022, Yang was questioned during a joint investigation by the Ministry of Justice's Agency Against Corruption and the Yilan County Prosecutors' Office. Investigators later stated that they had tracked nearly NT$100 million in transfers, dating to the early 2000s, from Yang to Lin Zi-miao and her relatives.
