= Wu Yao-ting =

Taiwanese businessman (1926-2012)

- Born: 20 June 1926; Kari Town, Hokumon District, Tainan Prefecture, Taiwan, Empire of Japan (modern-day Jiali, Tainan)
- Died: 4 February 2012 (aged 85); Kaohsiung, Taiwan
- Occupation: Businessman
- Known for: Founding of President Department Store

Chinese name
- Traditional Chinese: 吳耀庭
- Hanyu Pinyin: Wú Yàotíng
- Hokkien POJ: Ngô͘ Iāu-têng

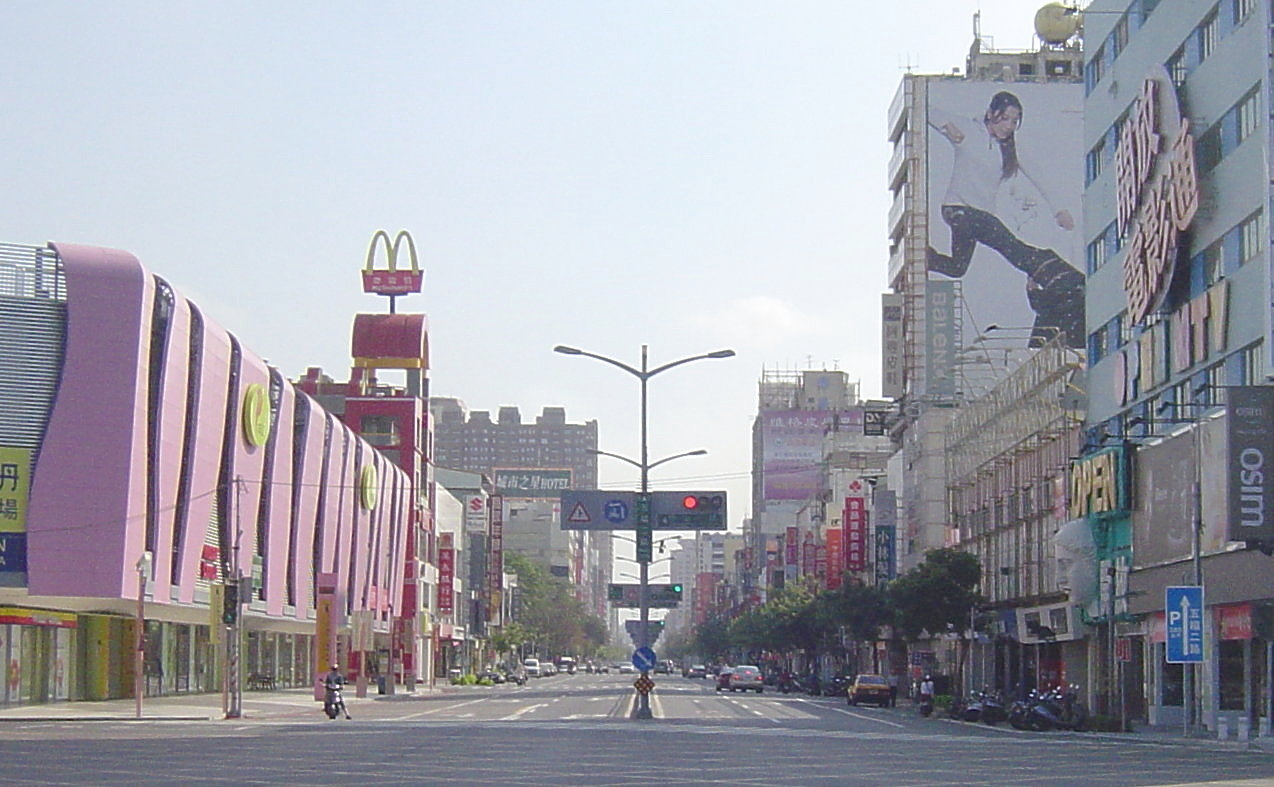
The Old President Department Store (left) was a 12-floor building. It was destroyed by a fire accident in 1995 and temporarily restored into a 4-floor store

Wu Yao-ting (Chinese: 吳耀庭; 20 June 1926 – 4 February 2012) was a Taiwanese businessman, best known as the founder of the President Department Store and other companies such as supermarket, hotel, and various food industry businesses.

In 1958, Wu established the department store Ta Shing (大新百貨), the first department store in Taiwan to have an escalator. In 1975, he subsequently established the President Department Store (大統百貨), the largest department store in Taiwan at that time. In 1984, Wu founded the Talee Department Store (大立百貨), which later became a Japanese-style department store Talee-Isetan (大立伊勢丹).

Additionally, Wu also founded Hotel Kingdom (華王飯店) and collaborated with Costco in Taiwan to operate several warehouse supermarkets. The department stores, hotels, supermarkets and shopping malls established by Wu are now being managed by the President Group (大統集團).

Wu died at Kaohsiung General Veterans Hospital (高雄榮民總醫院) on 4 February 2012.
