= Chen Zau-nan =

Taiwanese politician (born 1942)

Chen Zau-nan (Chinese: 陳昭南; born 11 December 1942) is a Taiwanese politician.

== Education and political activism ==
Chen Zau-nan studied music at the Taiwan Provincial Taipei Normal College, music education at the National Taiwan University of Arts, and later attended the University of Music and Performing Arts Vienna. He remained in Austria after completing his education, and was influenced by the nation's democracy, which led the Kuomintang one-party state in Taiwan to blacklist him from returning. After the Kaohsiung Incident of 1979, Chen moved to the United States and began working for the American branch of Formosa Magazine. Upon his 1990 return to Taiwan, Chen was held in the Tucheng Detention Center. Political persecution of Chen ended in 1992, following revisions to the Punishment of Rebellion Act in 1991 and Article 100 of the Criminal Code of the Republic of China in 1992.

== Formal political activity ==
After Mark Chen took office as Tainan County Magistrate, Chen Zau-nan assumed Mark Chen's party list Legislative Yuan seat in 1994. After completing Mark Chen's term in 1996, Chen Zau-nan was elected to a full term in his own right in 1998, via party list proportional representation. During his second stint as legislator, Chen also served on the Democratic Progressive Party's Central Committee. In 2001, Chen and fellow legislator Yang Chi-hsiung accused James Soong and his family of embezzlement, fraud, breach of trust, money laundering and tax evasion. Later that year, Chang Chun-hung substantiated allegations of vote selling against Wang Hsien-tang, stating that he, Chen Zau-nan, and Liu Kun-li had witnessed Wang planning prior the Democratic Progressive Party legislative primaries. Chen lost the party primary for a position on the Democratic Progressive Party list, and was instead named the Democratic Progressive candidate for the Kinmen County Magistracy in the 2001–02 Taiwanese local elections. This was the first time that DPP had named a magisterial candidate for a county dominated by New Party supporters. He lost to New Party candidate Lee Chu-feng.

== Political relationships and views ==
Chen Zau-nan is close to Chang Chun-hung. After Chen Shui-bian won the 2000 presidential election, Chen Zau-nan proposed removing Taiwan independence from the Democratic Progressive Party platform. In June 2014, Chen and Julian Kuo formally petitioned for the party to consider freezing the first article of its charter, which discussed independence. Opponents of the petition called for Chen and Kuo to resign their party membership. Party chair Tsai Ing-wen sent the petition to the DPP Central Executive Committee for future discussion.

== Later political activity ==
Prior to the 2018 Taiwanese local elections, Chen served as a mediator between the Social Democratic Party, Taiwan Radical Wings, and Green Party Taiwan, which decided to form an electoral coalition called the Social Welfare State Front. Chen has written political columns disseminated by Newtalk.
