= Huang Chih-hsien =

Taiwanese television host (born 1964)

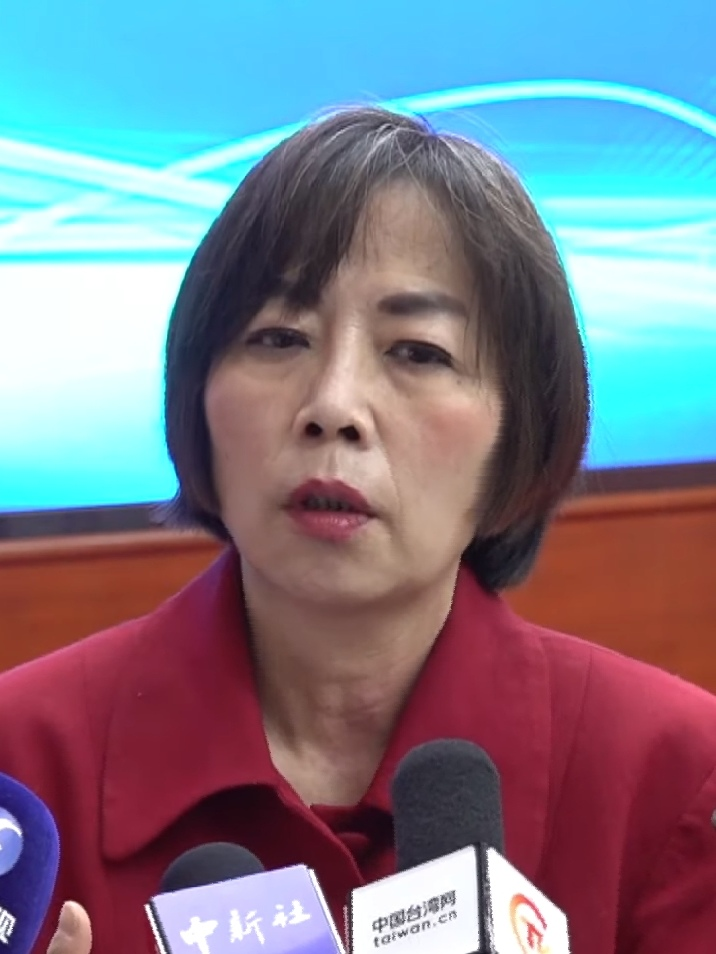
- Born: 1964 (age 61–62); Taipei, Taiwan
- Other names: Joyce Huang, Huang Chong-hsien
- Education: University of Leicester (MBA); Hunan University of Chinese Medicine (PhD)
- Relatives: Huang Wei-che (brother)

Huang Chih-hsien (Chinese: 黃智賢; born 1964), also known as Joyce Huang, is a Taiwanese political commentator. She was a television host on CTV and CTi TV between 2014 and 2019.

== Early life and education ==
Huang was born to a family of Taiwanese doctors in 1964. One of her brothers, Huang Wei-che, became the Mayor of Tainan. After being educated at Qianjin Junior High School she was admitted to Taipei First Girls' High School but later dropped out of high school and worked part-time jobs for seven years as a female electronics factory worker, a taxi driver, and a waitress. She later earned a Master of Business Administration (M.B.A.) in England from the University of Leicester and a doctorate in traditional Chinese medicine at Hunan University of Chinese Medicine.

== Incidents ==
With views supporting Chinese unification and "One country, two systems" on her work and her show, Late-Night Punch, she receives various complaints from pro-Taiwan independence groups. At a forum in Xiamen in June 2019, Joyce Huang said the separation between the mainland China and Taiwan without unification is the "greatest pain of the Chinese nation" and the tragedy "should not be allowed to continue", which drew criticism of her and her brother, Tainan mayor Huang Wei-che back in Taiwan.
