= Xinda (village) =

Coordinates: 23°14′23″N 120°12′17″E

Xinda Village 新達里
- Village
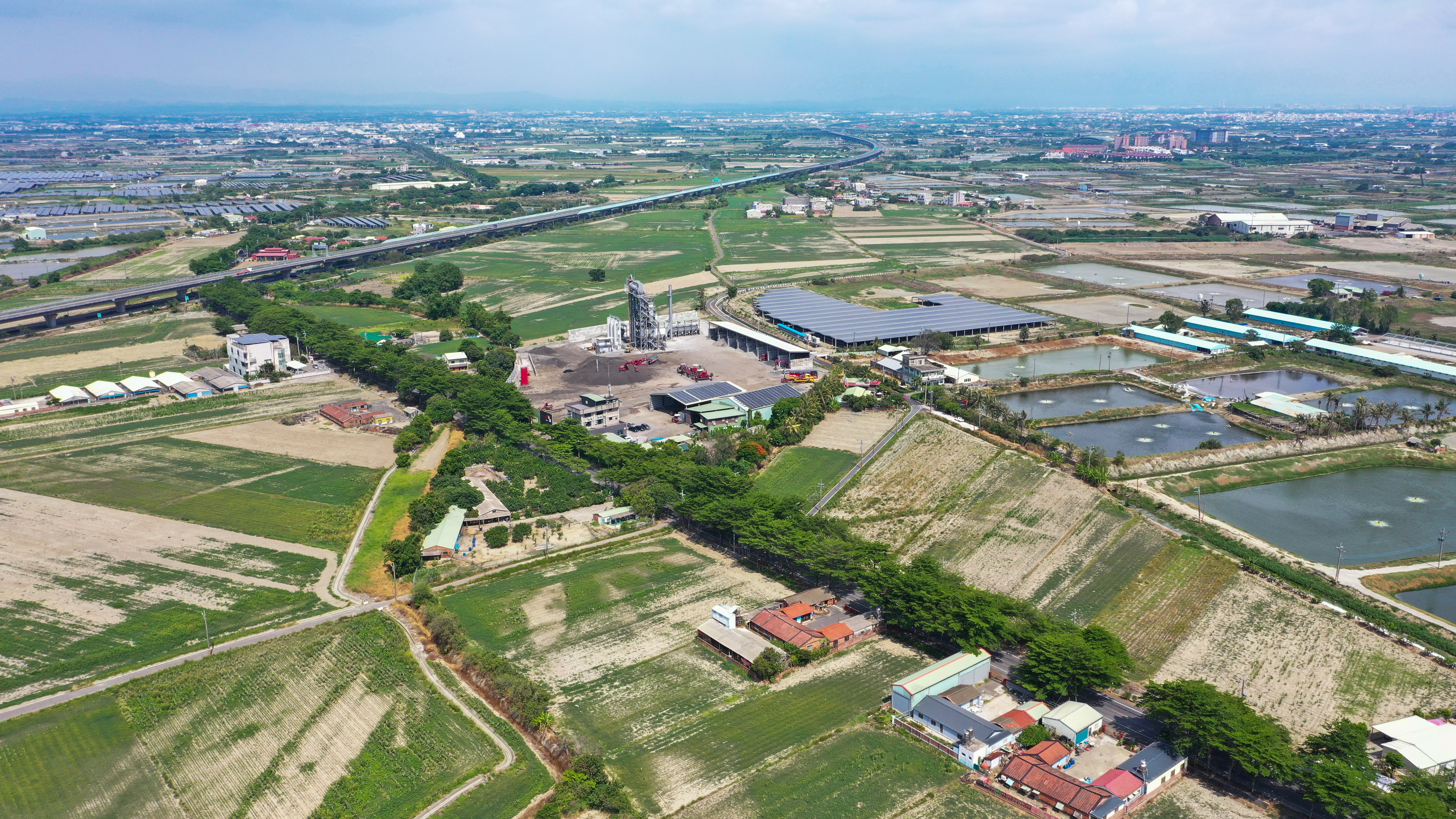
- A view of Xinda Village in Syuejia District, Tainan
- Interactive map of Xinda Village
- Country: Taiwan
- Municipality: Tainan City
- District: Syuejia District

Government
  - Village chief: Chen Min-nan

Population (June 2023)
  - Total: 2,207
- Postal code: 726
- Area code: 06
- Website: Syuejia District Office

Xinda Village (新達里) is in the eastern part of Syuejia District, Tainan City, Taiwan. It includes the areas formerly known as Xinsheng and Daming villages. As of June 2023, it had a population of 2,207 residents (1,139 males and 1,068 females) across 892 households. Xinda borders Xiaying District and is known for the scenic "Syuejia Green Tunnel".

== Etymology ==
Xinda Village was formed by the merger of Xinsheng and Daming villages.

Xinsheng Village was established in December 1945 (ROC Year 34) during an administrative reorganization. It combined the areas of Xinliao, Zhuangxingjiao, and Dingshanliao. The name "Xinsheng" (literally "new life") was chosen by local residents, emphasizing "Xinliao" (New Hamlet) and symbolizing renewal and vitality.

Daming Village was located in the eastern outskirts of Syuejia District. The name "Daming" was chosen to express hopes for a prosperous and bright future. In 1968, when Syuejia was upgraded administratively, the area was designated as Daming Village. Daming comprised two settlements: Shanliao and Waliao. Shanliao (Mountain Hamlet) earned its name due to its elevated terrain and a formation of seven small hills, once known collectively as "Qixing Shanliao" (Seven Star Mountain Hamlet). Waliao (Tile Hamlet) was named after a red-tile three-section courtyard house (sanheyuan) built by Li Yaoqian, which was the only such structure in the area at the time.

== Education and public institutions ==
=== Tainan municipal syuejia junior high school ===
Tainan Municipal Syuejia Junior High School was originally established in 1956 as a branch of the Beimen Agricultural Vocational School. With the assistance of local figure Chen Huazong, it became an independent institution in 1960 under the name "Tainan County Syuejia Junior High School," with Liu Zhi as its first principal. In 1968, in accordance with the national compulsory education policy, the school was restructured and renamed "Tainan County Syuejia Junior High School."

==== Bethlehem foundation for social welfare ====
The Bethlehem Foundation for Social Welfare (Chinese: 伯利恆社會福利基金會) is a non-profit organization located in Xinda Village, Tainan, Taiwan. It serves children with developmental delays and their families. The foundation was founded in 1986 by Father John B. Gaffney, a Catholic priest of the Maryknoll Fathers and Brothers, inspired by the biblical story of Jesus’ birth and the lack of welcome he received. The organization is committed to providing early intervention and inclusive preschool education for children with developmental needs.

Initially operating as "Loving Mother Kindergarten" (慈母幼稚園), the institution later became a non-profit preschool officially known as the Private Loving Mother Preschool (臺南市私立慈母幼兒園), affiliated with the Bethlehem Cultural and Educational Foundation.

== Attractions ==
=== Syuejia green tunnel ===
At the border of Syuejia District and Xiaying District in Tainan, along County Route 174, lies a row of Terminalia mantaly (commonly known as Madagascar almond trees) stretching over 500 meters. These trees form a scenic canopy referred to as the Syuejia Green Tunnel (Chinese: 學甲綠隧道), praised as the "most beautiful green tunnel" in the area.

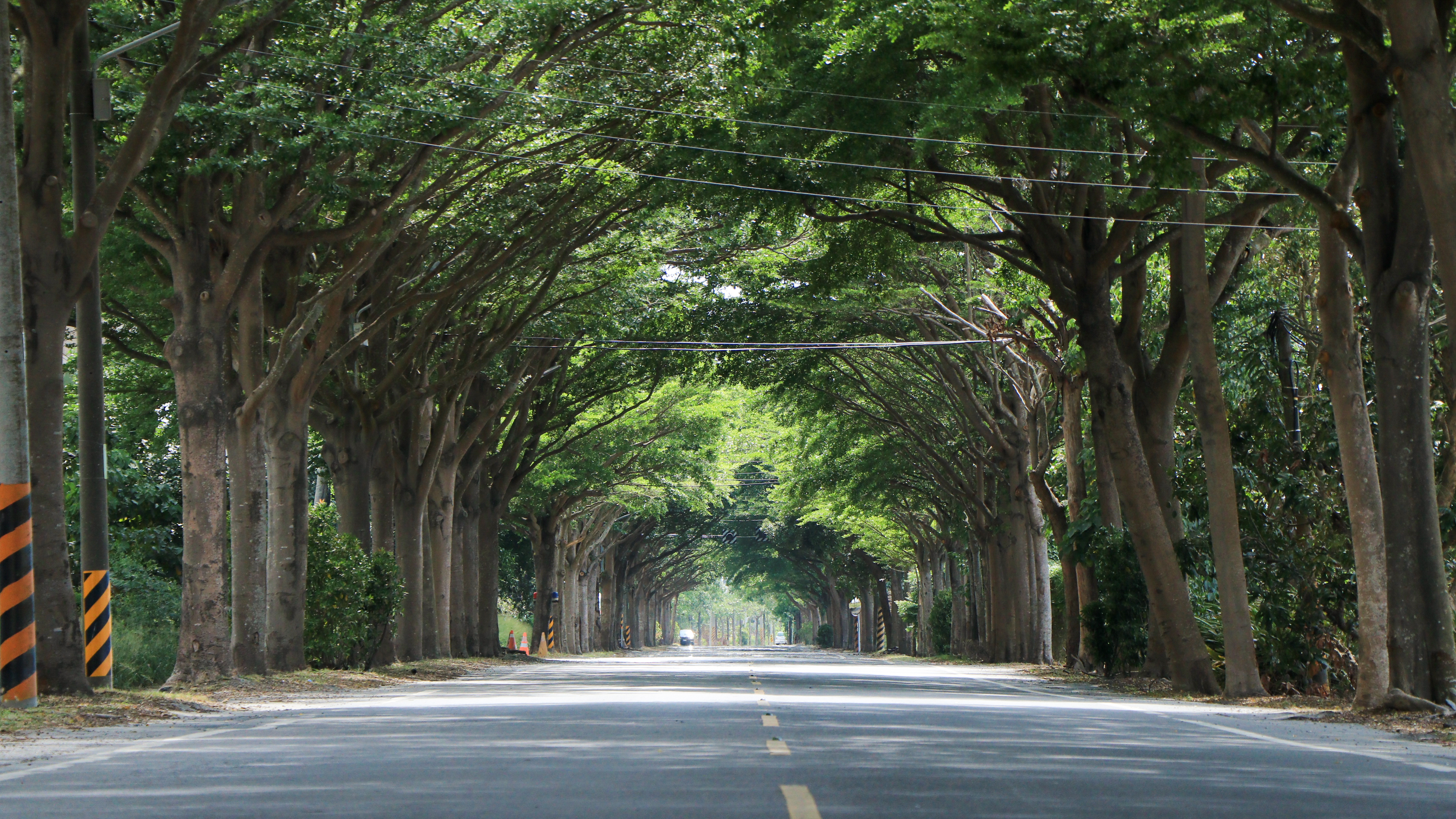

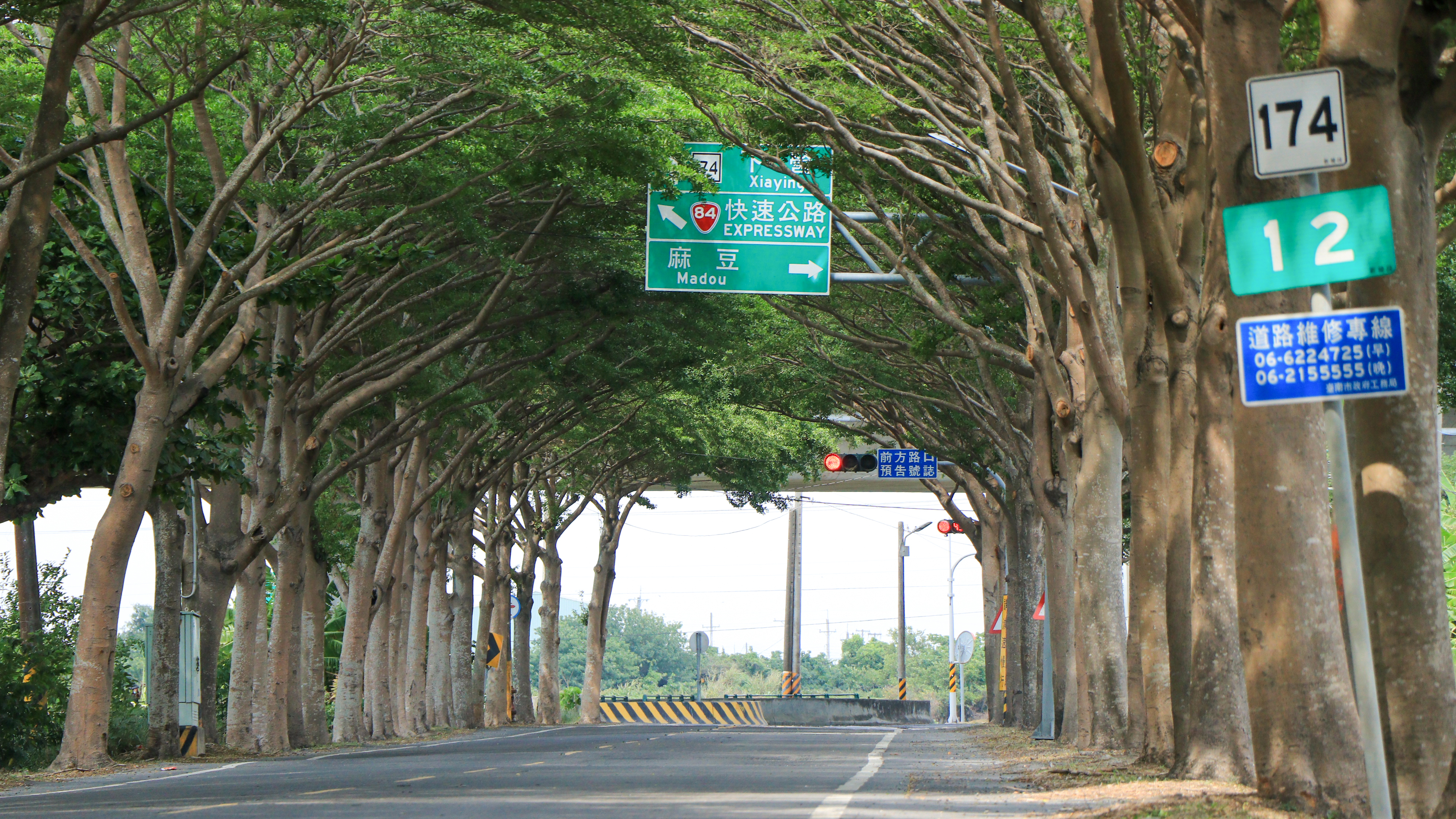
