= Su Huan-chih =

Taiwanese politician (born 1956)

Su Huan-chih MLY
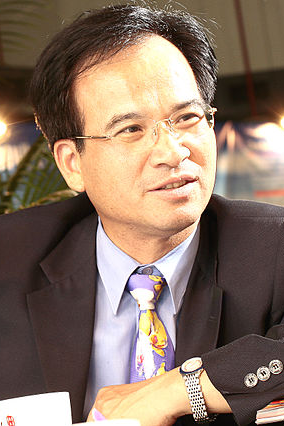
- Su in 2007

1st Convener of the Taiwan Renewal Party
- Incumbent
- Assumed office August 24, 2019
- Secretary General: Sam Lim
- Preceded by: Position established

10th Magistrate of Tainan County
- In office December 20, 2001 – December 25, 2010
- Preceded by: Mark Chen
- Succeeded by: William Lai (as Mayor of Tainan)

Member of the Legislative Yuan
- In office February 1, 1993 – December 20, 2001
- Constituency: Tainan County

Personal details
- Born: July 20, 1956 (age 69) Cigu Township, Tainan County, Taiwan
- Party: Taiwan Renewal Party (since 2019)
- Other political affiliations: Independent (2018–2019); Democratic Progressive Party (1991–2018)
- Education: National Taiwan University (LLB); Fu Jen Catholic University
- Profession: Lawyer

Chinese name
- Traditional Chinese: 蘇煥智
- Simplified Chinese: 苏焕智
Transcriptions
Standard Mandarin
- Hanyu Pinyin: Sū Huànzhì
- Wade–Giles: Su^{1} Huan^{4}-chih^{4}

Su Huan-chih (Chinese: 蘇煥智; born July 20, 1956) is a Taiwanese politician who was the magistrate of Tainan County from 2001 to 2010, until Tainan County's merger into Tainan City. Born in a rural township in southern Taiwan, Su graduated from National Taiwan University. He passed the bar examination in 1986 and started his career as a lawyer.

Su made his entry into politics in the 1990s. He was elected legislator three times in a row serving from 1992 to 2001. As an experienced legislator, Su launched a magisterial campaign in 2001 and was elected with over 51% of the votes, becoming the second member of the Democratic Progressive Party to ever hold the position.

== Early life and career ==
Su Huan-chih was born on July 20, 1956 in Cigu, Tainan County. He grew up in the agriculture-based township during his childhood years.

Su began studying at the prestigious National Taiwan University, majoring in physics. He decided to drop out and switched his major to law in 1977, earning an LL.B. degree. After passing the bar examination, Su started his career as a practicing lawyer. With his academic experience in physics, he was hired by IBM Taiwan to serve as its patent attorney.

Su gave up his job at IBM and went back to his hometown to run for legislator. He was elected a member of the Legislative Yuan in 1992. He promoted the senior welfare and environmental protection. Having been elected three times in a row, Su worked to decrease the difference in resource distribution between northern and southern Taiwan.

== Tainan magistracy ==
Su was elected the magistrate of Tainan County and took office on December 20, 2001. He focused on preserving the environment of the region. For example, he worked with international ecologists and planned to build a research center near the habitat of black-faced spoonbills with a goal to preserve these endangered birds.

The Su administration also improved the technological economy of the region. The net worth of the Tainan Science Park grew from NT$50.1 billion in 2001 to NT$451.6 billion in 2006. Apart from the growth in profit, many new industrial parks were established. As a result, Tainan County transformed from an agrarian county to a technological county.

Despite the technological innovations, Su also promoted agriculture of southern Taiwan. The Taiwan Orchid Plantation (Chinese: 台灣蘭花科技園區) was founded during his term. The plantation has held three international exhibitions since its establishment. The exhibitions attracted more than 600 thousand visitors gaining NT$400 million from export orders.

== Later political career ==
In March 2018, Su began his independent campaign for the Taipei mayoralty. He ended his Taipei mayoral bid in July, choosing to contest the same office in Tainan.

2018 Tainan City mayoral results
No.	Candidate	Party	Votes	Percentage
1	Huang Wei-cher	Democratic Progressive Party	367,518	38.02%
2	Kao Su-po	Kuomintang	312,874	32.37%
3	Lin Yi-feng (林義豐)	Independent	84,153	8.71%
4	Hsu Chun-hsin (許忠信)	Independent	45,168	4.67%
5	Chen Yong-he (陳永和)	Independent	117,179	12.12%
6	Su Huan-chih	Independent	39,778	4.11%
Total voters			1,546,862	
Valid votes			966,670	
Invalid votes				
Voter turnout			62.49%	

On 24 August 2019, Su founded the Taiwan Renewal Party and was elected its convenor. During the 2022 local election cycle, Su contested the Taipei mayoralty.

Political offices
Preceded by Mark Chen	Magistrate of Tainan County; 2001–2010	Succeeded by County merged into Tainan City; William Lai as the mayor of Tainan
