= Soulangh Cultural Park =

Event venue in Jiali, Tainan, Taiwan

- 蕭壠文化園區
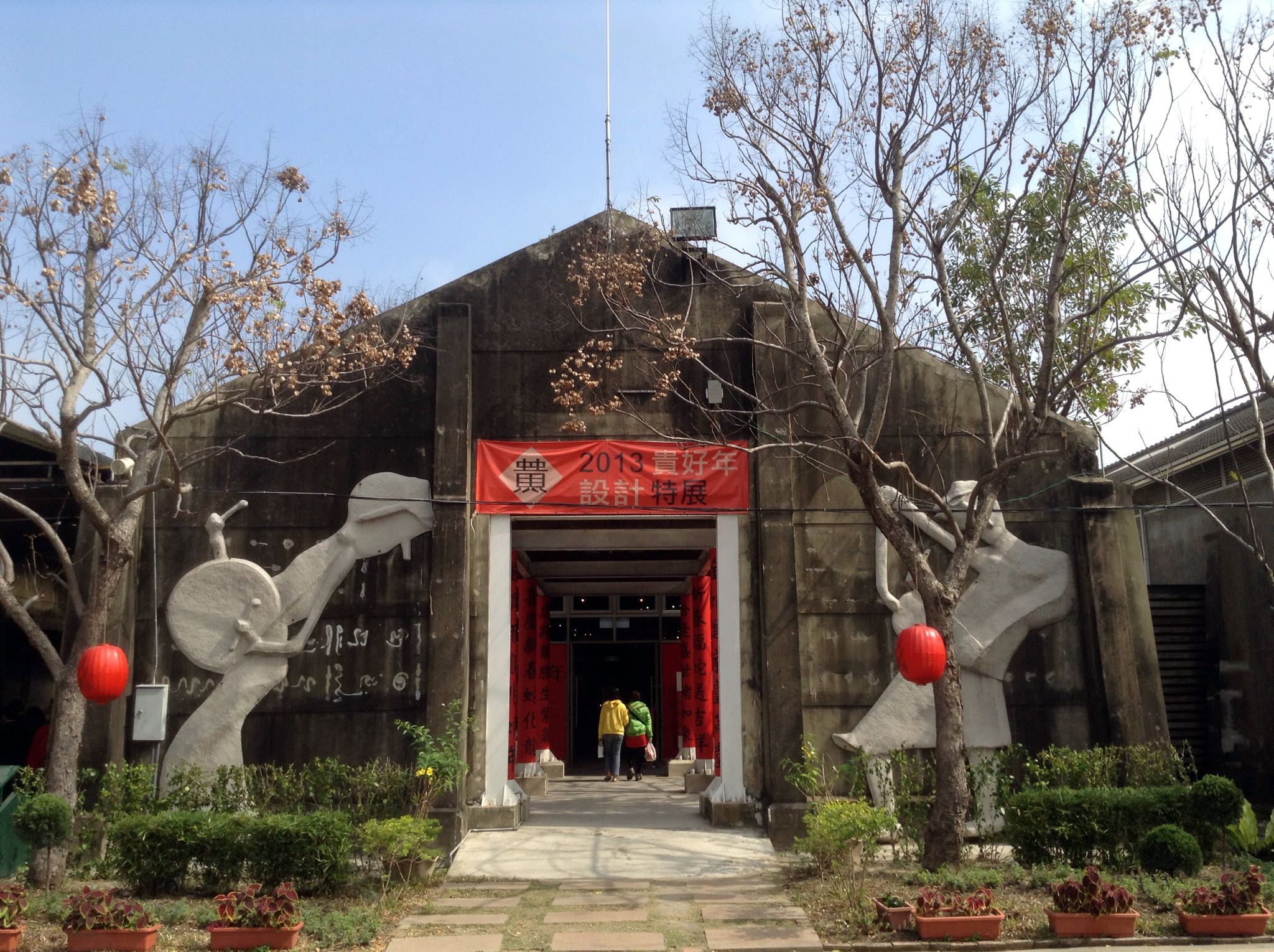
- Interactive map of the Soulangh Cultural Park area
- Former names: Jiali Sugar Factory

General information
- Type: former sugar factory
- Location: Jiali, Tainan, Taiwan
- Coordinates: 23°10′23.5″N 120°10′45.2″E
- Completed: 1906
- Opened: 2005

Technical details
- Floor area: 13.8 hectares

Website
- Official website

The Soulangh Cultural Park (Chinese: 蕭壠文化園區; pinyin: Xiāolǒng Wénhuà Yuánqū) is a multi-purpose park in Jiali District, Tainan, Taiwan.

== History ==
The cultural park was originally built as Jiali Sugar Factory or Soulangh Sugar Refinery in 1906 during the Japanese rule of Taiwan. The factory was closed down in 1995. In 2003, the Soulangh Cultural Park Preparatory Office was established. The factory was then transformed into Soulangh Cultural Park and was opened in 2005. In 2013, it initiated the Soulangh Artist Village.

== Architecture ==
The cultural park also consists of 14 former warehouses of the factory. It also has library, playroom and museum.

== Exhibitions ==
The cultural park displays exhibitions on Tainan folk art and Siraya people.

== See also ==
- List of tourist attractions in Taiwan
