= Mark Chen =

Taiwanese politician

Chen Tan-sun MLY
- 陳唐山
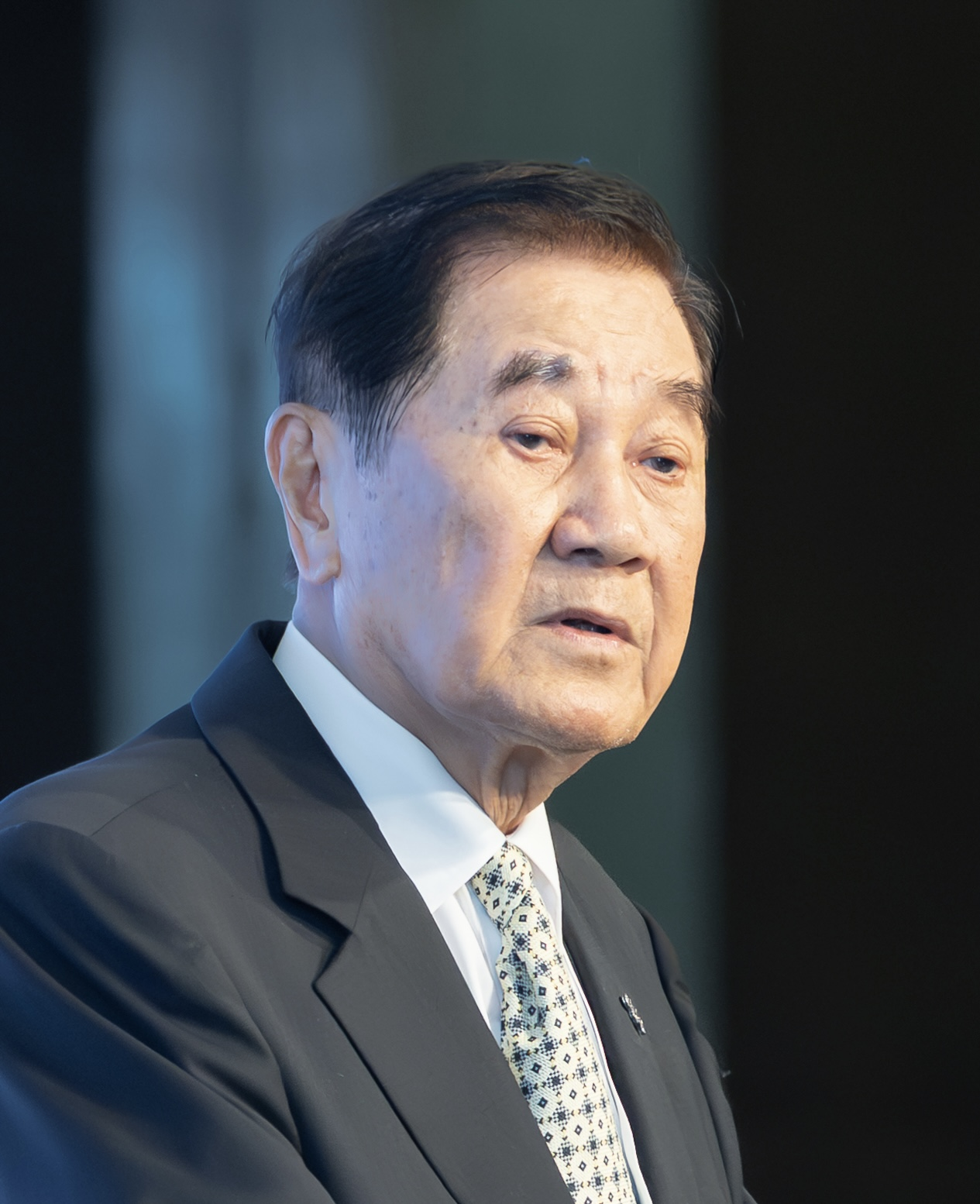
- Chen in 2025

20th and 23rd Secretary-General to the President
- In office 23 March 2008 – 20 May 2008
- President: Chen Shui-bian
- Preceded by: Yeh Chu-lan
- Succeeded by: Chan Chun-po
- In office 25 January 2006 – 6 February 2007
- President: Chen Shui-bian
- Preceded by: Ma Yung-chen (acting); Yu Shyi-kun
- Succeeded by: Chiou I-jen

9th Secretary-General of the National Security Council
- In office 6 February 2007 – 27 March 2008
- Chairman: Chen Shui-bian
- Preceded by: Chiou I-jen
- Succeeded by: Su Chi

18th Minister of Foreign Affairs
- In office 16 April 2004 – 14 January 2006
- Prime Minister: Yu Shyi-kun; Frank Hsieh
- Preceded by: Eugene Chien
- Succeeded by: James C. F. Huang

7th Magistrate of Tainan
- In office 20 December 1993 – 20 December 2001
- Preceded by: Lee Ya-chiao
- Succeeded by: Su Huan-chih

Member of the Legislative Yuan
- In office 1 February 2012 – 31 January 2016
- Preceded by: Lee Chun-yee
- Succeeded by: Wang Ting-yu
- Constituency: Tainan 5th
- In office 1 February 2002 – 15 April 2004
- Constituency: Tainan
- In office 1 February 1993 – 20 December 1993
- Succeeded by: Chen Zau-nan
- Constituency: Party-list

Personal details
- Born: 16 September 1935 (age 90) Tainan Prefecture, Taiwan, Empire of Japan
- Party: Democratic Progressive Party
- Education: National Taiwan University (BS); University of Oklahoma (MS); Purdue University (PhD)

Chen Tan-sun (Chinese: 陳唐山; pinyin: Chén Tángshān; Pe̍h-ōe-jī: Tân Tông-san; born 16 September 1935), also known by his English name Mark Chen, is a Taiwanese politician and atmospheric scientist who served as Secretary-General of the Office of the President of Taiwan under former President Chen Shui-bian. He was also previously Foreign Minister of the ROC from 2004 to 2006 (the first Democratic Progressive Party member to occupy the position). Before returning to Taiwan, he worked for the United States Department of Commerce from 1973 to 1992, over 19 years.

== Early life and education ==
Chen was born in Tainan on 16 September 1935 during Japanese rule. After graduating from National Taiwan University in 1957 with a Bachelor of Science (B.S.) in atmospheric science, Chen completed advanced studies in the United States, where he earned a Master of Science (M.S.) from the University of Oklahoma in 1966 and his Ph.D. from Purdue University in 1972 on a National Science Foundation grant. His doctoral dissertation, completed under professor Ernest M. Agee, was titled, "A Study of Eddy Viscosity Effects on Mesoscale Cellular Convection."

After receiving his doctorate, Chen worked as an official at the United States Department of Commerce from 1973 to 1992.

== Political career ==
Chen became part of the Taiwan independence movement while he was completing his post-graduate education in the United States. In 1970, he organized the World United Formosans for Independence. After the establishment of the World Federation of Taiwanese Associations, Chen Tang-shan became its president from 1979 to 1984.

Because of his political views, Chen was put on a blacklist by the Kuomintang government during this time, and was unable to return to Taiwan. He was eventually allowed to return with the advent of Taiwan's democratization. In 1992, Chen joined the Democratic Progressive Party and was elected a member of the Legislative Yuan. In December 1993, he was nominated the candidate of Tainan County Magistrate by the DPP and was elected. He was reelected again in 1997 with 66% of the vote.

In 2001, Chen returned to the Legislative Yuan as a representative of Tainan County. He became the Republic of China's thirty-second Foreign Minister in 2004. After Frank Hsieh resigned his Premiership and a subsequent cabinet shuffle, Chen became the Secretary of the Presidential Office. In 2004, Chen gained international attention and prompted substantial criticism worldwide after he commented that Singapore is a "booger-size country" that "holding China's ball sacks" with both hands, known as the "LP incident". Subsequently, the Singaporean Foreign Ministry has issued a statement warning Taiwan authorities to "not belittle Singapore, and avoid using “vulgar words to hurt others". Despite such comment, Singaporean politicians and lawmakers across the board and political spectrum overall refused to be drawn into a war of words or tensions over Chen's comments, which were described as "vulgar" and "undiplomatic", and even prompted criticism from some Taiwanese politicians, who urged him to withdraw such comments to avoid letting Singapore-Taiwan relations from deteriorating over the incident. However, Chen has not since taken back such words, but overall bilateral relations were not otherwise affected.

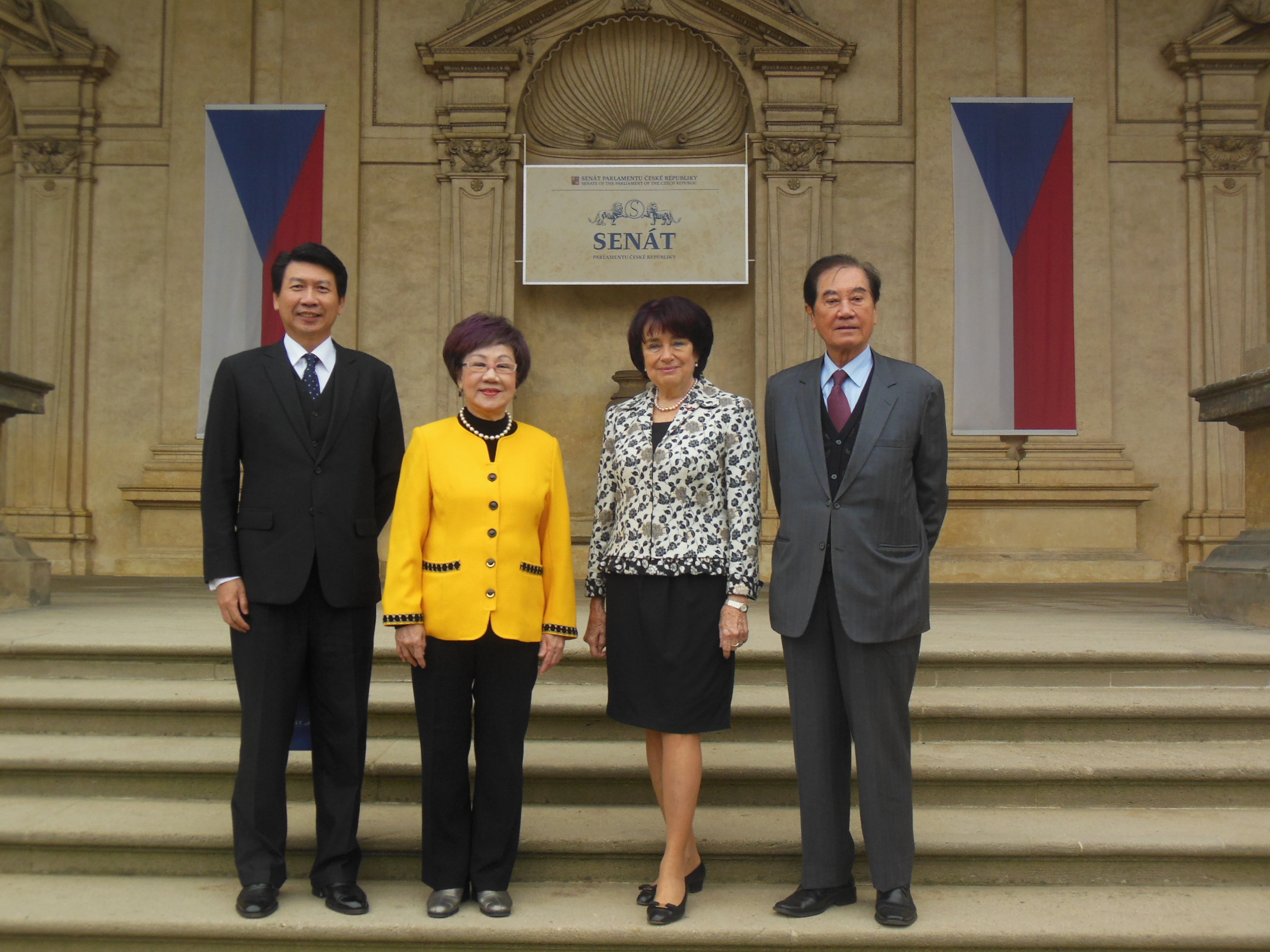
Chen with Ambassador Joey Wang, Annette Lu and Eva Syková during the 2016 Forum 2000 conference in Prague

On September 21, 2007, Chen faced charges of using false receipts to write off expenses from a special governmental account; the alleged misuse involved NT$368,199 (approximately US$12,454) during his time as foreign minister and presidential secretary general between July 2004 and June 2006. Vice President Annette Lu and DPP chairperson Yu Shyi-kun were also indicted on special fund abuse charges on the same day. Subsequently, in 2012, the Taipei District Court dismissed the case against Chen, finding him not guilty of all charges. Both Lu and Yu were similarly found not guilty. The court ruled that all three officials did not improperly use their special allowances and discretionary state affairs funds.

In 2012, Chen was again elected to the Legislative Yuan for a four-year term, once again representing Tainan County.

== Personal life ==
He is a distant relative of Japanese politician Renhō.
