= Huang Wei-che =

Taiwanese politician (born 1963)

- 黃偉哲
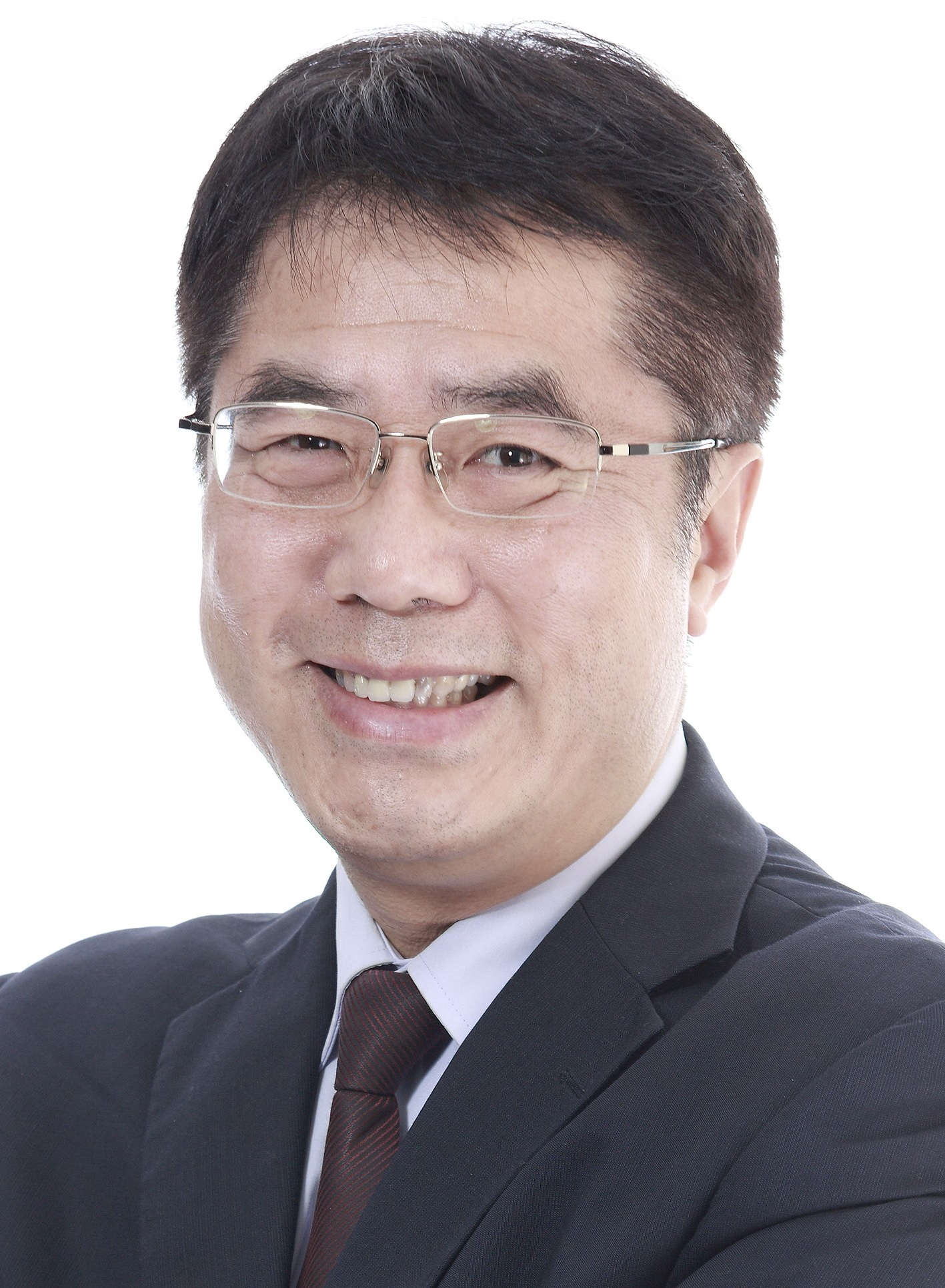
- Official portrait, 2016

2nd Mayor of Tainan
- Incumbent
- Assumed office 25 December 2018
- Preceded by: Li Meng-yen (acting)

Member of the Legislative Yuan
- In office 1 February 2005 – 25 December 2018
- Succeeded by: Robert Kuo (2019)
- Constituency: See list: Tainan City II (2012–2018) Tainan County II (2008–2012) Tainan County (2005–2008)

Personal details
- Born: 26 September 1963 (age 63) Cigu, Tainan, Taiwan
- Party: Democratic Progressive Party
- Relatives: Joyce Huang (sister); Su Tzu-yun (brother); Alex Huang (cousin)
- Education: National Taiwan University (BS); Yale University (MPH); Harvard University (MPA)

Huang Wei-che (Chinese: 黃偉哲; pinyin: Huáng Wěizhé; born 26 September 1963) is a Taiwanese politician and medical researcher who has served as the 2nd mayor of Tainan since 2018. He was previously a member of the Legislative Yuan from 2005 to 2018.

== Early life and education ==
Huang was born in Cigu District, Tainan, in 1963. He was one of five children. His father, Huang Hui-huang (黃輝煌), was a physician, and his mother was a teacher. His sister, Huang Chih-hsien, is a political commentator, and his younger brother, Su Tzu-yun (who took his mother's surname), is a researcher at the Taiwan Center for Security Studies at National Chengchi University.

Huang graduated from Taipei Municipal Chien Kuo High School. He then attended National Taiwan University, graduating with a Bachelor of Science (B.S.) in agronomy in 1988. As an undergraduate, Huang was involved in multiple student protests, and volunteered in HIV/AIDS research. He then pursued graduate studies in the United States, earning a Master of Public Health (M.P.H.) from Yale University in 1993 and a Master of Public Administration (M.P.A.) from Harvard University in 2001.

== Political career ==
=== Early political career ===
Huang began his political career working as a legislative assistant in the offices of DPP legislators Chen Ding-nan, Lu Hsiu-yi, and Yeh Chu-lan. In 1996, he was elected as a representative to the third National Assembly. Huang then served as a Tainan County councillor, a consultant to the Executive Yuan, and a senior specialist in the Executive Yuan's Council of Agriculture.

=== Legislative Yuan ===
Huang was elected to the Legislative Yuan on 1 February 2005 as a DPP legislator representing Tainan County and ultimately served four consecutive terms, from the sixth through ninth Legislative Yuan. Following the introduction of single-member legislative districts in 2008, he represented Tainan County's second electoral district and, after the merger of Tainan City and County, Tainan City Constituency II. In the 2016 legislative election, Huang won reelection with 146,414 votes, or 76.47 percent of the vote.

During the seventh Legislative Yuan he sat on the Finance, Economics, and Judiciary and Organic Laws and Statutes committees. During the eighth Legislative Yuan, he served on the Economics Committee before moving to the Foreign Affairs and National Defense Committee, and served as convener of both committees during portions of the term.

=== Mayor of Tainan ===
In January 2018, Huang registered for the DPP's nomination in the race to be Mayor of Tainan, entering a six-candidate primary against legislators Chen Ting-fei, Wang Ting-yu and Yeh Yi-jin, former deputy mayor Yen Chun-tso, and former DPP deputy secretary-general Lee Chun-yi. He won the party's telephone primary in March with a score of 0.4158, ahead of Chen's 0.2817 and the other four candidates. During the general-election campaign, Huang organized his platform around five themes—culture, economic and industrial development, a "smart" city, urban and rural revitalization, and social welfare—and released 100 individual policy proposals during the final 100 days of the campaign.

Huang won the 2018 Tainan mayoral election on 24 November 2018 with 367,518 votes, defeating Kuomintang candidate Kao Su-po, who received 312,874 votes, as well as four independent candidates. He resigned from the Legislative Yuan effective 25 December 2018 and took office as mayor the same day. The first document Huang signed after his inauguration requested that the Ministry of Economic Affairs cease extending the development permit for a controversial industrial-waste landfill in Longci District. In January 2019, his administration designated the proposed landfill site a temporary natural landscape, halting construction while its preservation status was considered. In 2021, a city review committee approved the designation of approximately 149 hectares of the area as a nature reserve and another 132 hectares as a geopark.

Huang in 2020

Ahead of the 2022 election, Huang faced allegations, based on records produced by security agencies during Taiwan's authoritarian period, that he had acted as an inside informant on student activist organizations for college officials while a university student; Huang denied having served as an informant or betrayed fellow student activists. The Transitional Justice Commission stated that several details in reports concerning its investigation of Huang were inconsistent with the facts and cautioned that authoritarian-era surveillance records could contain both accurate and inaccurate information and required corroboration. On 2 March, the DPP Central Executive Committee approved Huang's nomination for a second term as mayor.

Huang was re-elected to a second term on 26 November 2022, receiving 433,684 votes in the five-candidate mayoral contest. At the beginning of his second term on 25 December, he signed an integrity pledge as his first official document and identified transportation, welfare for younger and older residents, and clean government as three principal priorities. In September 2026, as his second and final consecutive mayoral term reached its end, Huang said that he intended to serve out the term and had not yet decided what office, if any, he would pursue afterward.

=== 2018 Tainan City mayoral election ===
2018 Democratic Progressive Party Tainan City mayoral primary results
Candidates	Place	Results
Huang Wei-che	Nominated	41.58%
Chen Ting-fei	2nd	28.17%
Yen Chun-zuo	3rd	6.72%
Wang Ting-yu	4th	5.13%
Li Jun-yi	5th	2.11%
Yeh Yi-jin	6th	0.76%

2018 Tainan City mayoral results
No.	Candidate	Party	Votes	Percentage
1	Huang Wei-che	Democratic Progressive Party	367,518	38.02%
2	Kao Su-po	Kuomintang	312,874	32.37%
3	Lin Yi-feng (林義豐)	Independent	84,153	8.71%
4	Hsu Chun-hsin (許忠信)	Independent	45,168	4.67%
5	Chen Yong-he (陳永和)	Independent	117,179	12.12%
6	Su Huan-chih	Independent	39,778	4.11%
Total voters			1,546,862	
Valid votes			966,670	
Invalid votes				
Voter turnout			62.49%	

Political offices
Preceded by Li Meng-yen; Acting	Mayor of Tainan; 2018–present	Incumbent
