= Cigu District =

District in Tainan, Taiwan

Coordinates: 23°07′11″N 120°06′12″E

Cigu 七股區
- Rural district
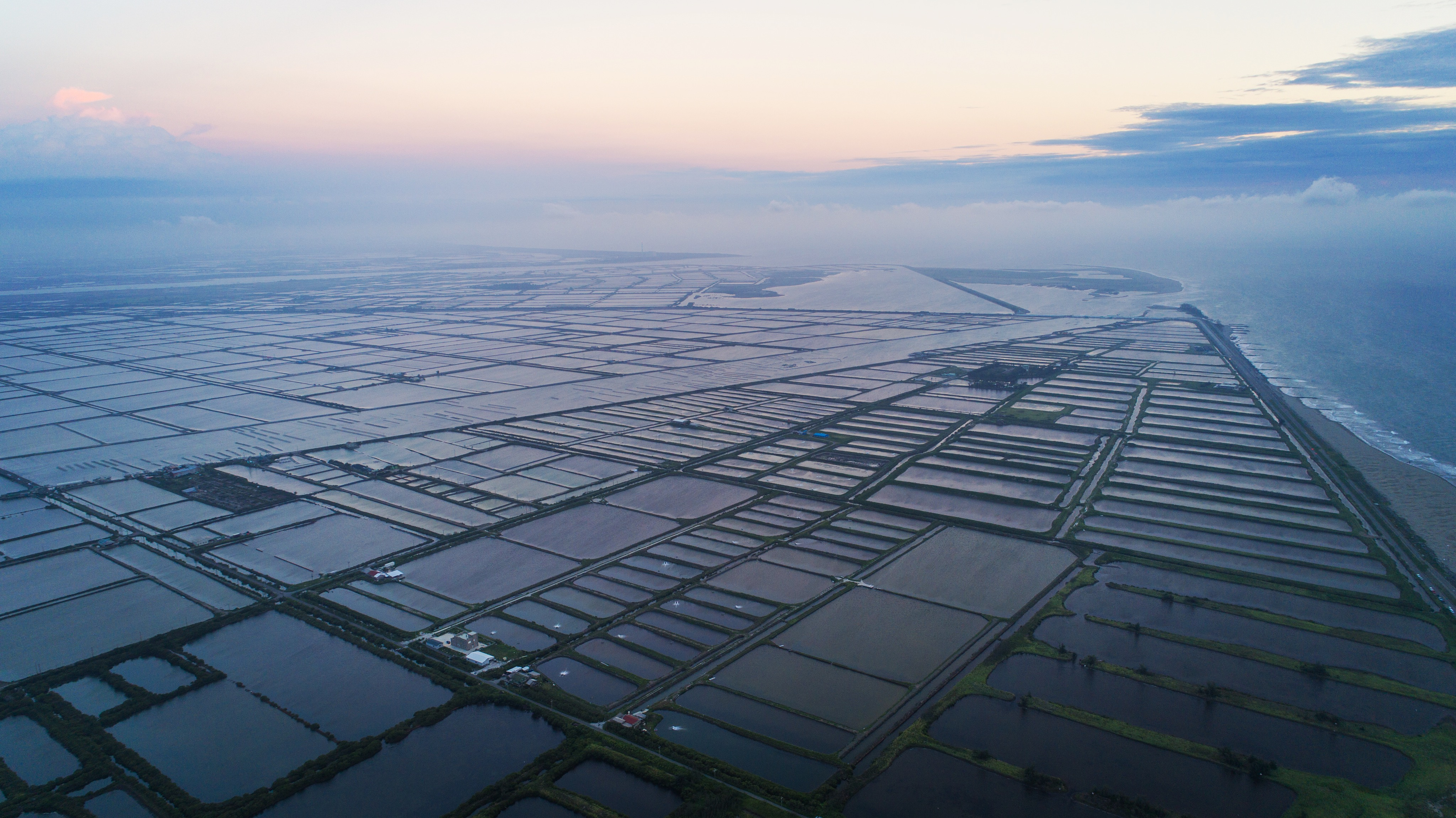
- Coastal fish farms in Cigu

- 七股區公所; CIGU DISTRICT OFFICE

- Cigu District in Tainan City
- Location: Tainan, Taiwan

Government
  - Type: District government
  - District Chief: Chuang Ming-hao

Area
  - Total: 110 km^{2} (42 sq mi)

Population (March 2023)
  - Total: 21,441
- Website: cigu.tainan.gov.tw/en/

Cigu District
- Traditional Chinese: 七股區
Transcriptions
Standard Mandarin
- Hanyu Pinyin: Qīgǔ Qū
- Wade–Giles: Ch'i¹-ku³ Ch'ü¹
- Tongyong Pinyin: Cigǔ Cyu
Southern Min
- Hokkien POJ: Chhit-kó͘ Khu

Cigu District or Chiku is a rural district in the city of Tainan with about 21,441 inhabitants, situated on the westernmost point of the island of Taiwan.

The Cigu Lagoon is located in this township, and an ecological conservation area for black-faced spoonbills is situated on the estuary of the Zengwen River. It was a salt producing area, but now most of the salt products are imported from other counties.

== History ==
Around 360 years ago, seven settlers arrived in the area from China and built a fish farm. At that time, the area was mostly inhabited. Gradually, new settlers started to spread northwards over the next 80 years. There was only one port at that time and people made a living based from offshore fishing. As the population gradually increased, they began to cultivate the lands near the coast to grow grains and make salt.

Cigu was organized as a rural township of Tainan County. On 25 December 2010, Tainan County was merged with Tainan City and Cigu was upgraded to a district of the city.

== Administrative divisions ==
The district consists of Hougang, Datan, Dujia, Dingshan, Xiliao, Yancheng, Longshan, Xinan, Qigu, Yucheng, Dacheng, Shulin, Zhongliao, Zhuqiao, Yige, Yongji, Sangu and Shifen Village.

== Tourist attractions ==
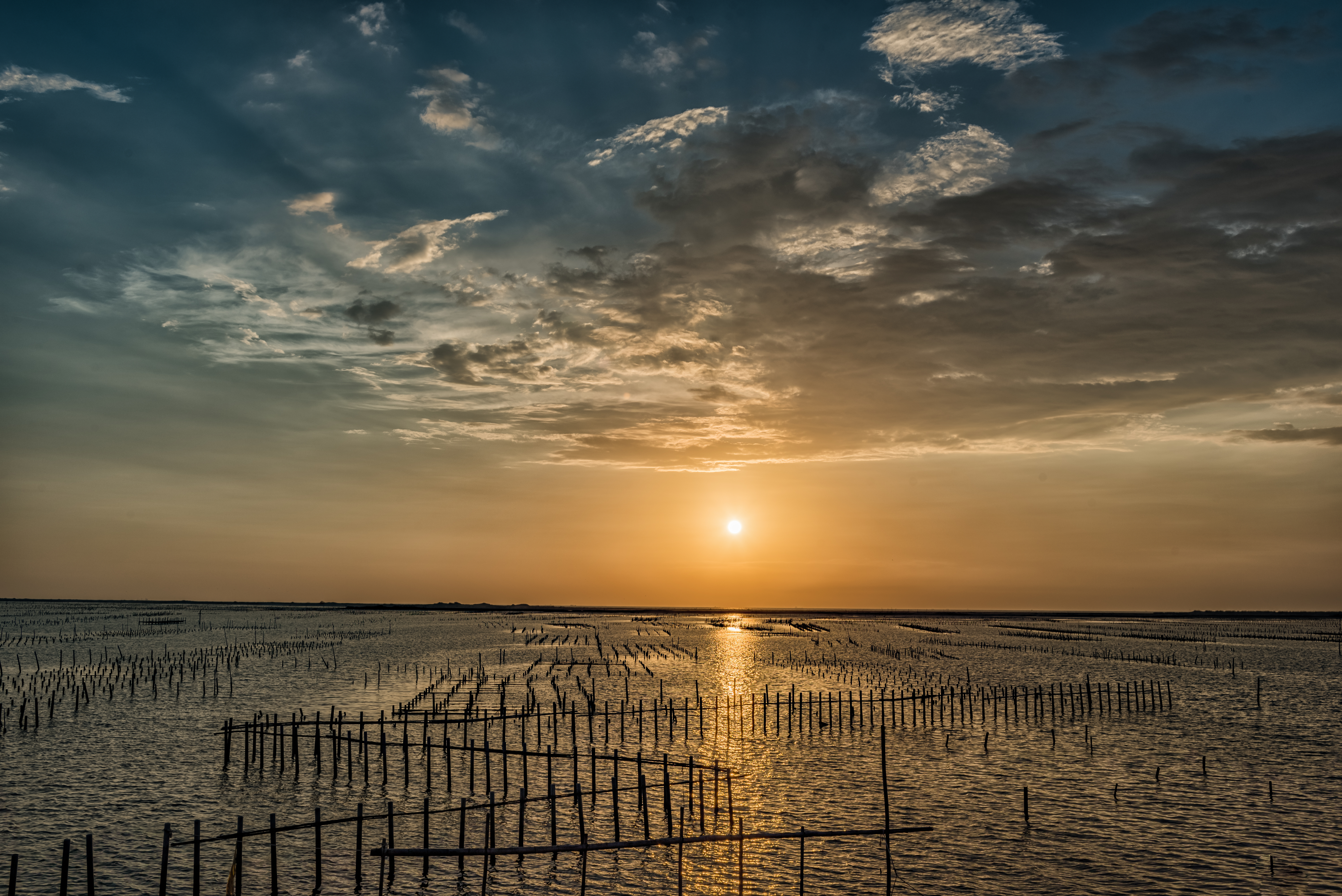
Oyster farms at Cigu Lagoon

- Black-faced spoonbill Conservation Area
- Cigu Lagoon
- Cigu Salt Fields
- Cigu Salt Mountain
- Taiwan Salt Museum

== Notable natives ==
- Huang Wei-che, Mayor of Tainan
- Su Huan-chih, Magistrate of Tainan County (2001-2010)

== See also ==
- Tainan
