= Jiali District =

District in Tainan, Taiwan

Coordinates: 23°10′0.8″N 120°10′42.5″E

Jiali 佳里區 Kari
- District
- Jiali District
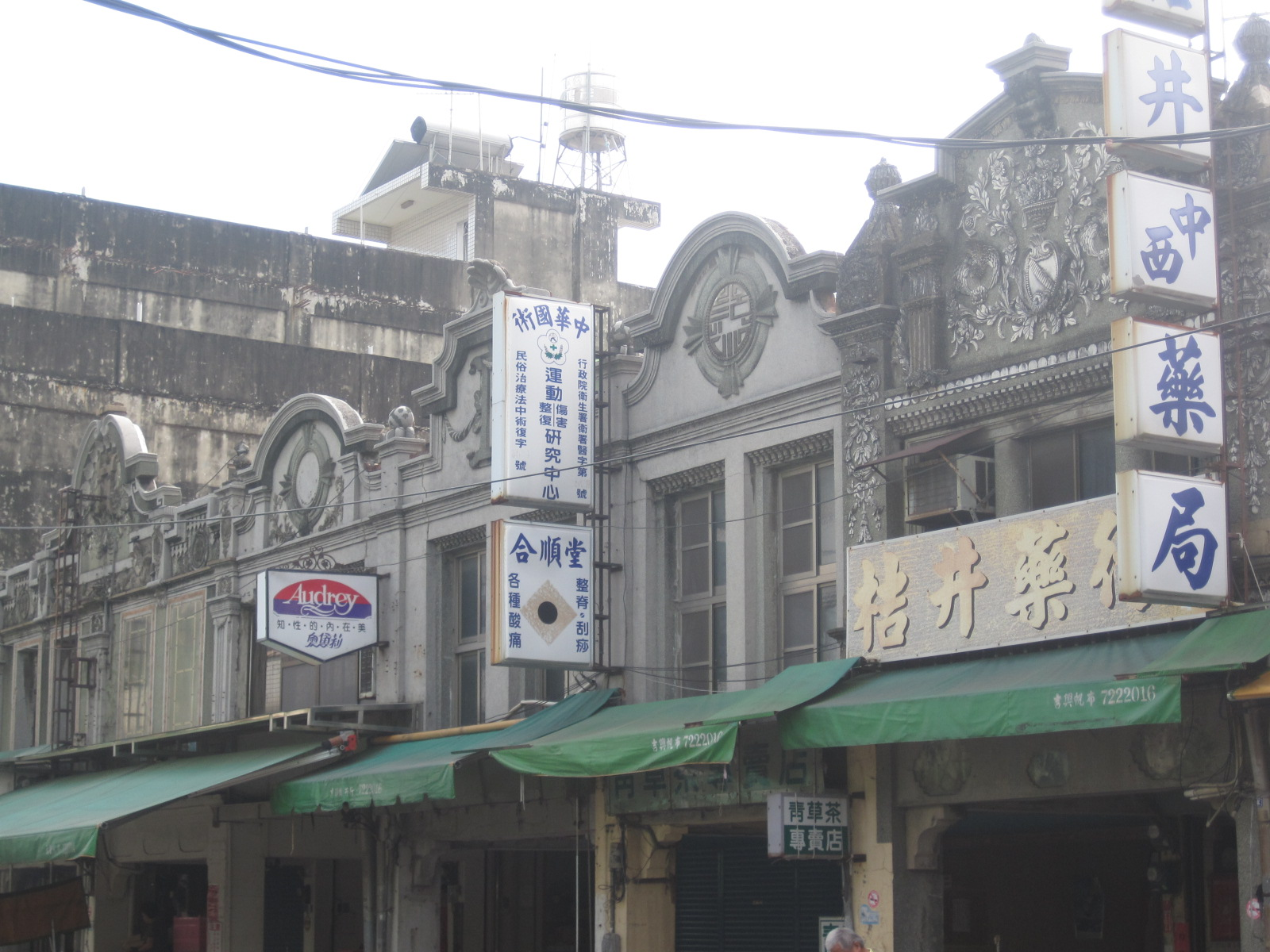

- Jiali District in Tainan City
- Location: Tainan, Taiwan

Area
  - Total: 39 km^{2} (15 sq mi)

Population (May 2022)
  - Total: 58,162
  - Density: 1,500/km^{2} (3,900/sq mi)
- Website: jiali722.tainan.gov.tw/en

Jiali District (Chinese: 佳里區; pinyin: Jiālǐ Qū; Wade–Giles: Chia^{1}-li^{3} Ch'ü^{1}; Pe̍h-ōe-jī: Ka-lí) is a district located in northern Tainan, Taiwan, about 15 km north of the former Dutch base of Fort Zeelandia.

== History ==
In the 17th century, the place was named Soulang after one of the four subtribes of the local Siraya aborigines. Soulang was a village of about 1,500 inhabitants about 15 kilometres (9.3 mi) north of Fort Zeelandia, and became a station of the Dutch East India Company. It later became the Chinese market-town called Siau-lang (Chinese: 蕭瓏 / 蕭隴 / 蕭壟; Pe̍h-ōe-jī: Siau-lang / Siau-lâng).

=== Republic of China ===
After the handover of Taiwan from Japan to the Republic of China in 1945, Jiali was organized as an urban township of Tainan County. On 25 December 2010, Tainan County was merged with Tainan City and Jiali was upgraded to a district of the city.

== Administrative divisions ==
The district consists of Tungning, Zhongren, Zhenshan, Jiannan, Anxi, Liuan, Jiahua, Haideng, Minan, Zilong, Yingxi, Wenxin, Jiaxing, Xiaying, Wennei and Nanshi Village.

== Education ==
- National Pei Men Senior High School
- National Pei-men Senior Agricultural and Industrial Vocational School, PMAI

== Tourist attractions ==
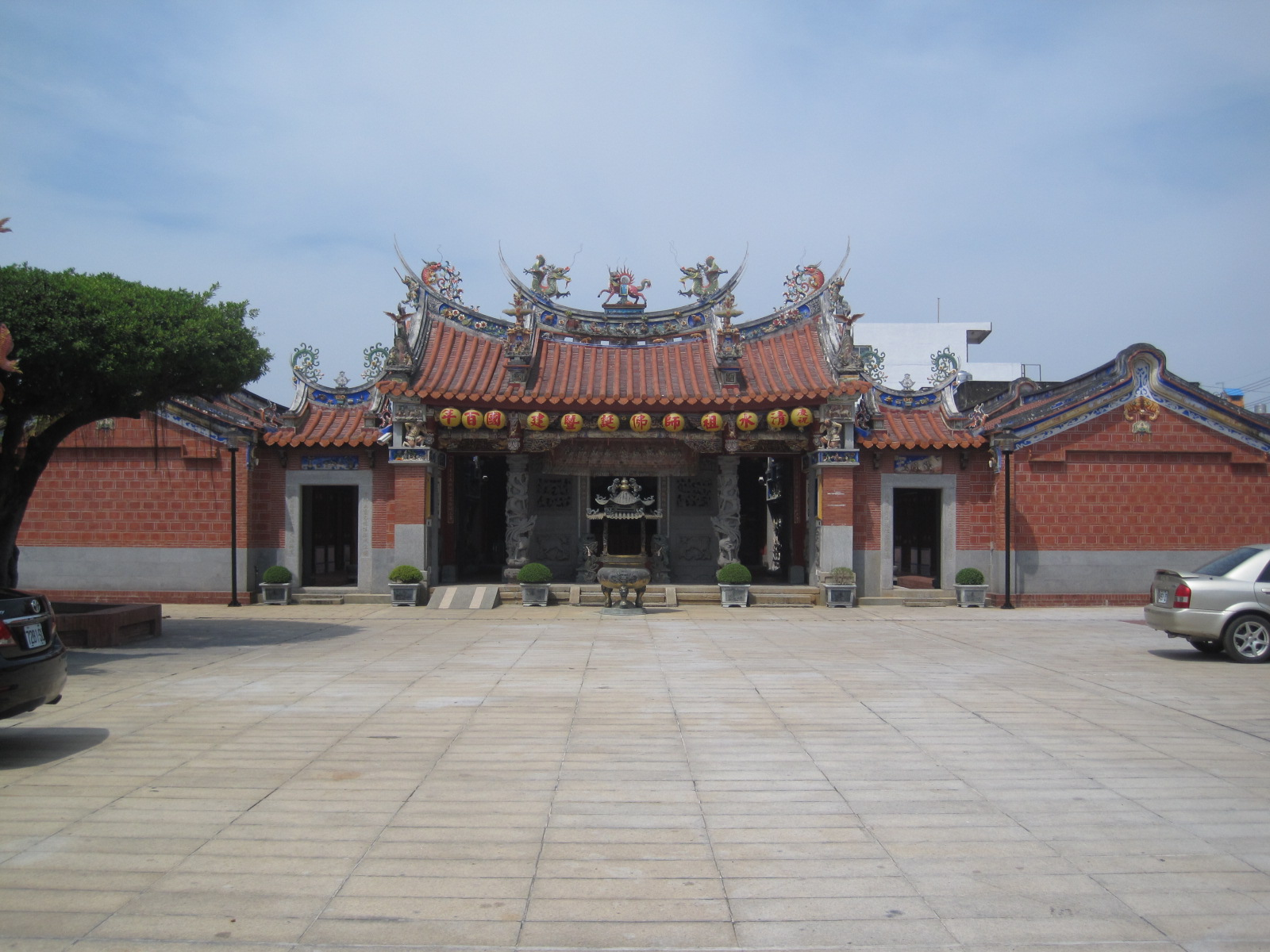
Zhengxing Temple

- Soulangh Cultural Park
- Jintang Temple
- Zhengxing Temple
- Beitouyang Cultural Park

== Transportation ==
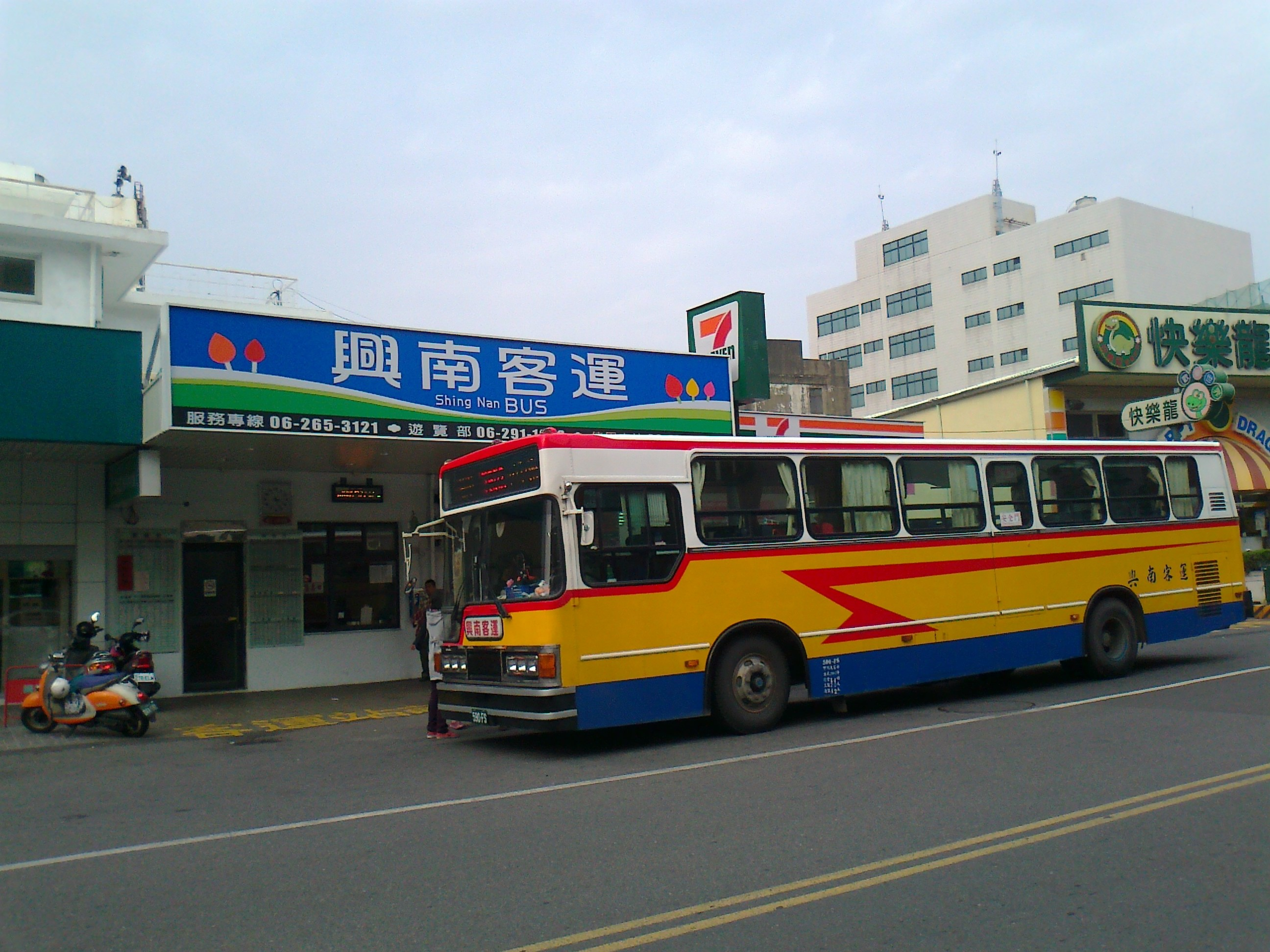
Jiali Bus Station

- Jiali Bus Station

== Notable natives ==
- Chen Li-chen, Mayor of Chiayi City (2000–2005)
- Wei Yao-chien, member of Legislative Yuan (1990–1996)
- Wu Yao-ting, businessperson
