= Prince Noodles =

Taiwanese instant noodle brand

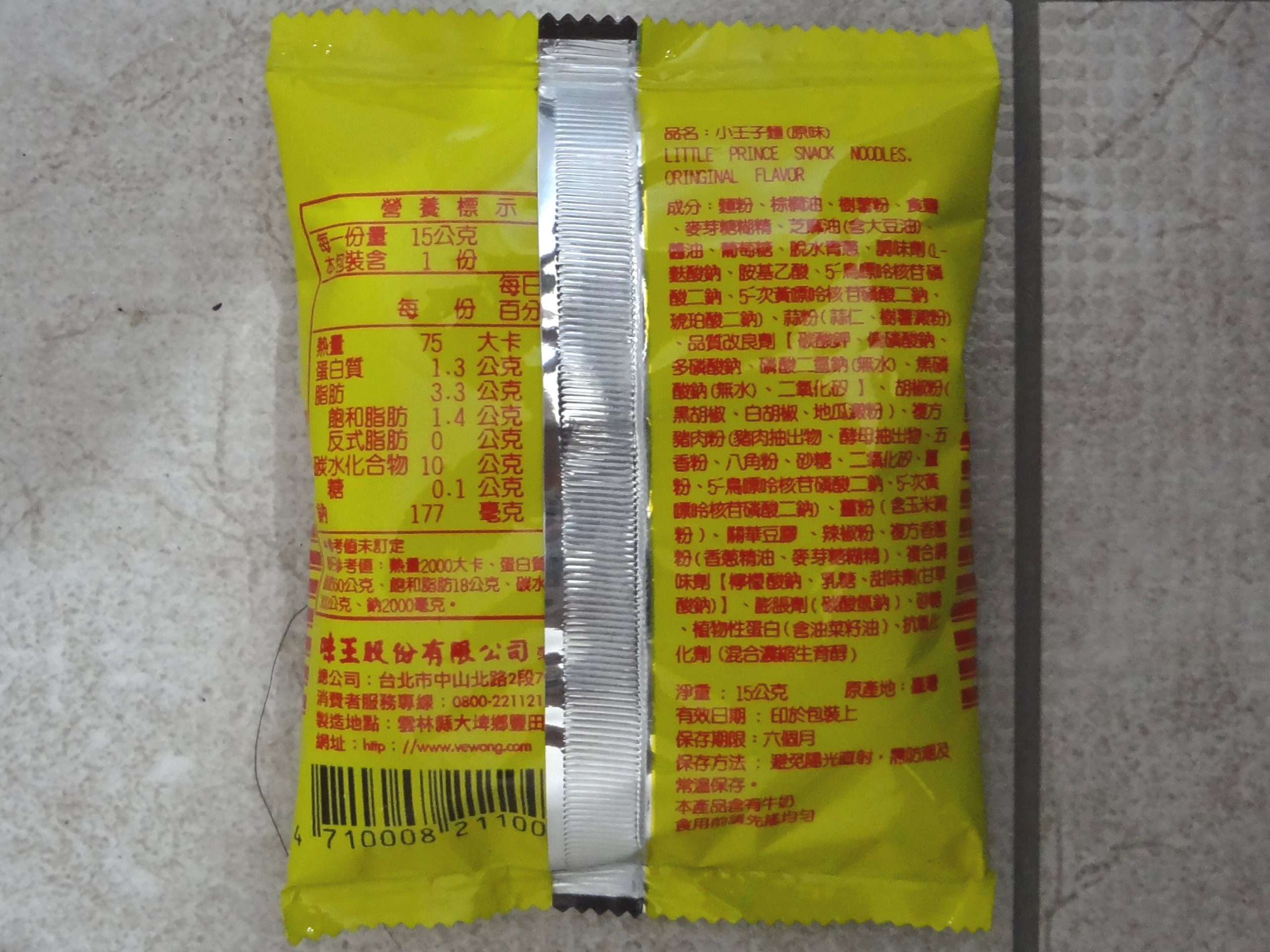
- Product type: Instant noodles, snack
- Produced by: Ve Wong Corporation
- Country: Taiwan

Prince Noodles (Chinese: 王子麵; pinyin: Wángzǐmiàn; lit. 'Prince Noodles') are a brand of instant noodle from the Ve Wong Corporation of Taiwan.

== History ==
Prince Noodles entered the market in 1973. By the mid-1980s, a new brand with a similar concept Science Noodles manufactured by Uni-President Enterprises Corporation was launched in the market and began to compete with Prince Noodles, causing the latter's sales performance to decline.

== See also ==
- List of instant noodle brands
- List of noodles
