= Thirteen Villages of Syuejia =

Group of villages in Tainan, Taiwan

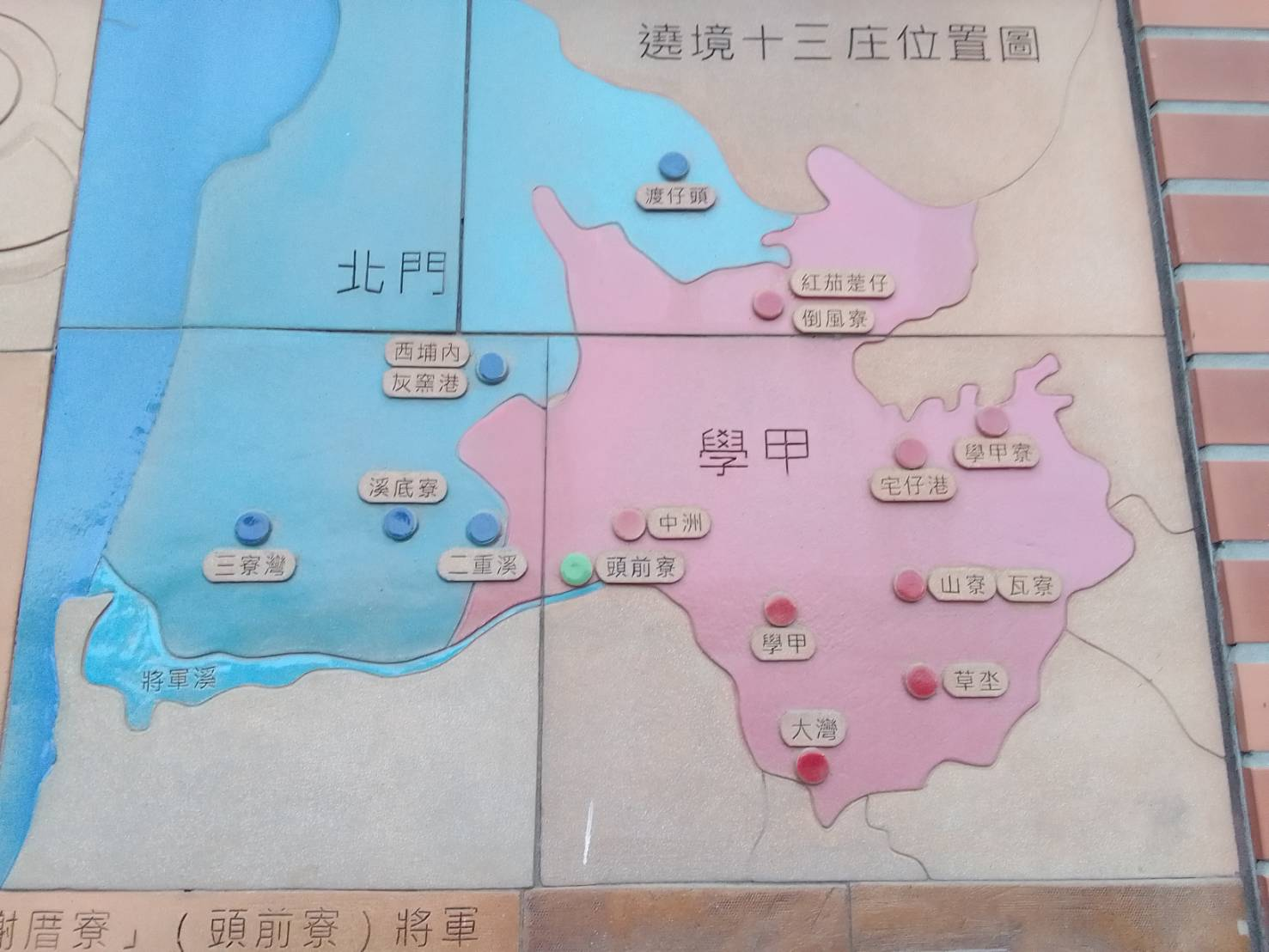
The general location of the Thirteen Villages of Syuejia on a map of Syuejia District and Beimen District

The Thirteen Villages of Syuejia (Chinese: 學甲十三庄; Hanyu Pinyin: xuéjiǎshísānzhuāng; Tongyong Pinyin: syuéjiǎshíhsanjhuang; Pe̍h-ōe-jī: ha̍k-kah-cha̍p-saⁿ-chng) were a group of Taiwanese Mandarin villages built in the seventeenth century CE, in what is now the Syuejia District (學甲區) and Beimen District (北門區), Tainan City, Taiwan. In 1661, when Koxinga arrived in the south-west part of Taiwan, four families from Baijiao Township (白礁鄉), Tonan County (同安縣), Fujian Province, China with the last names Chen (陳), Li (李), Hsieh (謝) and Chuang (莊) came along and built these villages.

== List of Villages ==
8 of them were located in the Syuejia District:

- Syuejia (學甲) was located in the middle part of the district and is now the urban area.
- Zhongzhou (中洲, means "center land") was located in the center of the district.
- Dawan (大灣, means "big bay") was located in the southernmost part of the district. Many of the ancestors from here were formally from Dawan, Yongkang District (永康區), Tainan.
- Caodi (草坔, means "grassland with mud") was located in the south-east and it got its name because of the low altitude.
- Shanliao (山寮, means "house by the mountain") got its name from the sand dune, cishinshan (七星山) that is nearby.
- Zhaizigang (宅仔港) was also located in the south-east.
- Syuejialiao (學甲寮, means "house by Syuejia")
- Daofengliao (ShinFang) (倒風寮 (新芳), means "house by Daofeng") was located in the north and it got its name because it was built on the side of an ancient bay, Daofeng Inland Sea (倒風內海).

5 of them were located in the Beimen District:

- Sanliaowan (三寮灣, means "the bay with three houses") was located in the south-east, and west of Xidiliao.
- Xidiliao (溪底寮, means "house by the end of the river") was located in the south. It was once a larger unit, which included four villages: Sanliaowan, Xidiliao, Erchonggang and Luzhugou (蘆竹溝).
- Erchonggang (二重港, means "village with two small harbors") was also located in the south-east, but on the eastern side of Xidiliao. Many people that live there have the last name "Ho" (侯).
- Duzitou (渡仔頭, means "the start of the boats landed") was located in the north-west, by the estuary of the Yanshui River (鹽水溪).
- Huiyaogang (灰磘港, means "harbor with many stoves to burn oyster shells") was located in the east of the district. It got its name due to a popular industry of burning oyster shells into ashes. The ash was an important ingredient for architectures at the time.

== Industry ==
Located on the east side of the Taiwan Strait, the villages were deeply influenced by the sea. It formed a culture or lifestyle called the Salt Land Lifestyle (鹽分地帶). Under this lifestyle, each villages had their own unique industries. The most common type was Fishery and Agriculture.

Fishing would be common in villages such as Xidiliao, Duzitou etc.. They would breed oysters, milkfish, shrimps, and others.

Agriculture would mostly be seen in areas such as Dawan, Sanliaowan, Erchonggang etc.. In those places, they would dry farm due to the high salinity of the soil that was often too high for many plants. They grew garlic, scallion, shallot, corn and such.

Apart from these, trading was once very prevalent here.
