= Syuejia Hollyhock Festival =

The Syuejia Hollyhock Festival is a cultural event held by the Guanghua Community in Syuejia District, Tainan City. It was originally initiated by local residents as part of a broader government initiative to revitalize fallow farmland. Hollyhocks were planted across approximately five hectares of idle land, and the festival was organized through self-funded efforts.

It later received support from the Syuejia District Office, the Farmers’ Association, and the Agriculture Bureau. During the blooming season, a variety of cultural and agricultural activities are held, and the festival incorporates the surrounding fields of wheat, rapeseed flowers, and mesona flowers, covering approximately twenty hectares in total.

Subsequently, the Tainan District Prosecutors' Office provided special project support for hollyhock cultivation, with around 100 individuals performing community service as part of their sentences, assisting in the planting and maintenance of the hollyhocks.

== Gallery ==
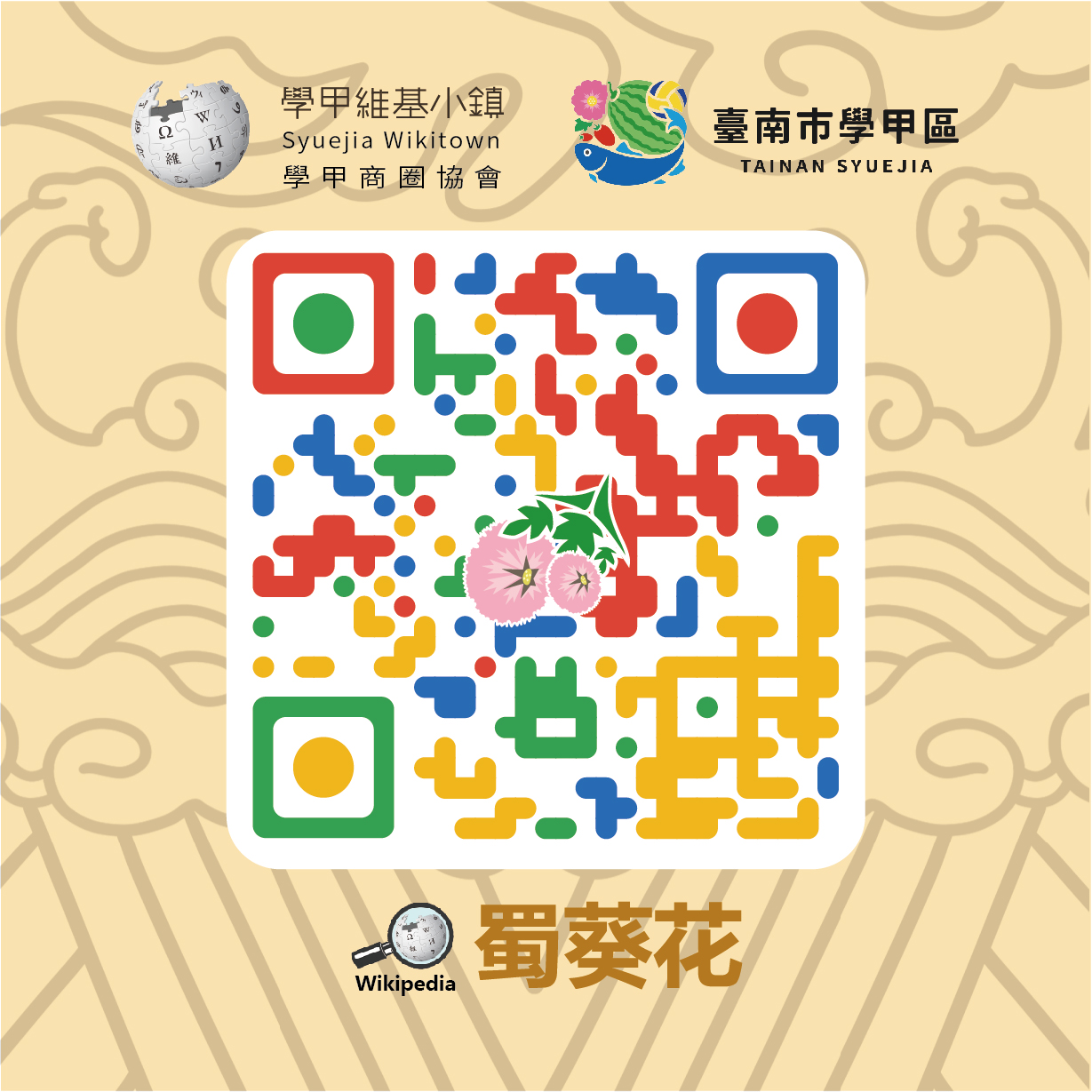
Hollyhock – Syuejia WikiTown Color QR Code Ceramic Plaque

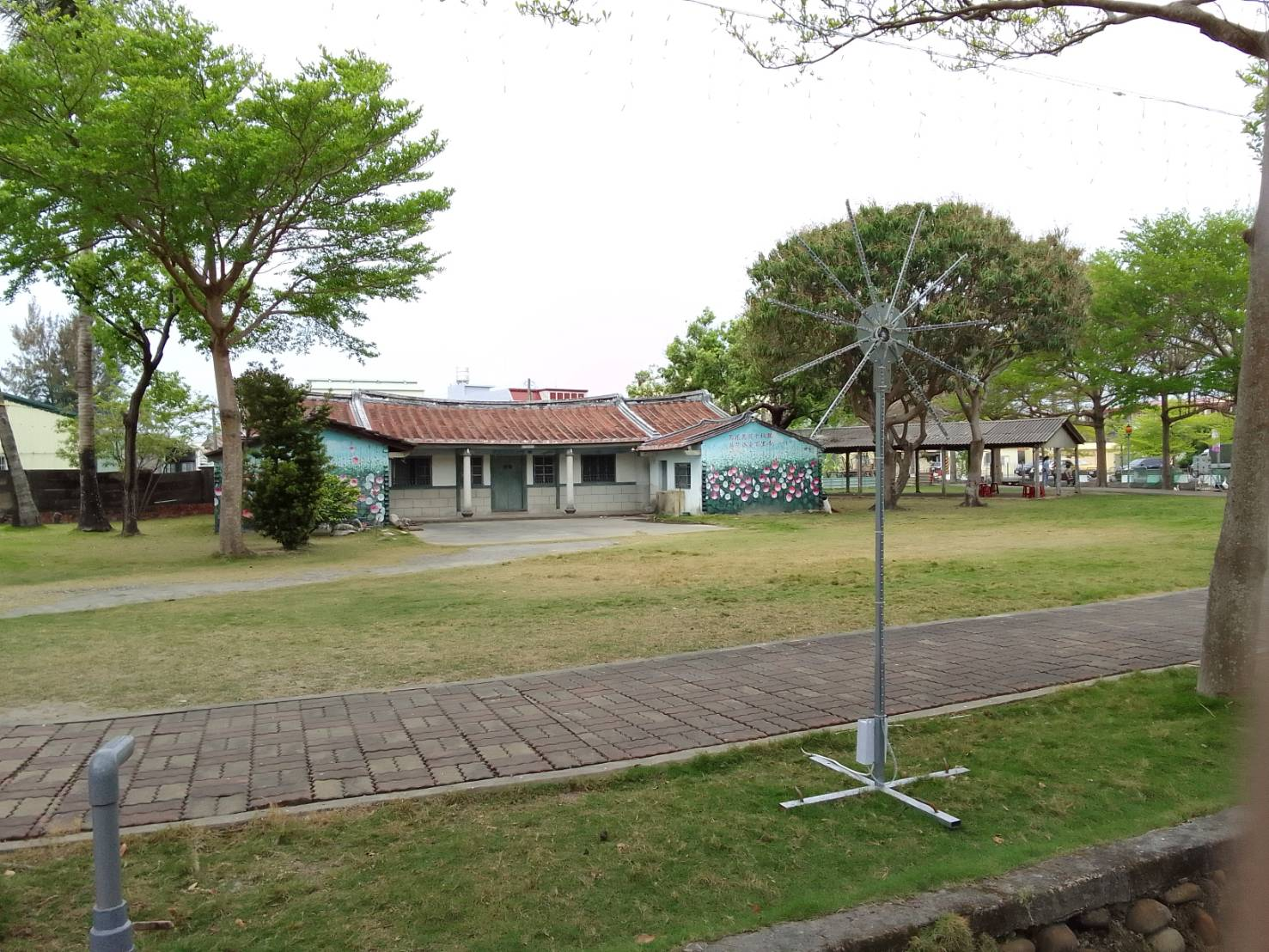
Hollyhock Cultural Festival Venue – 1

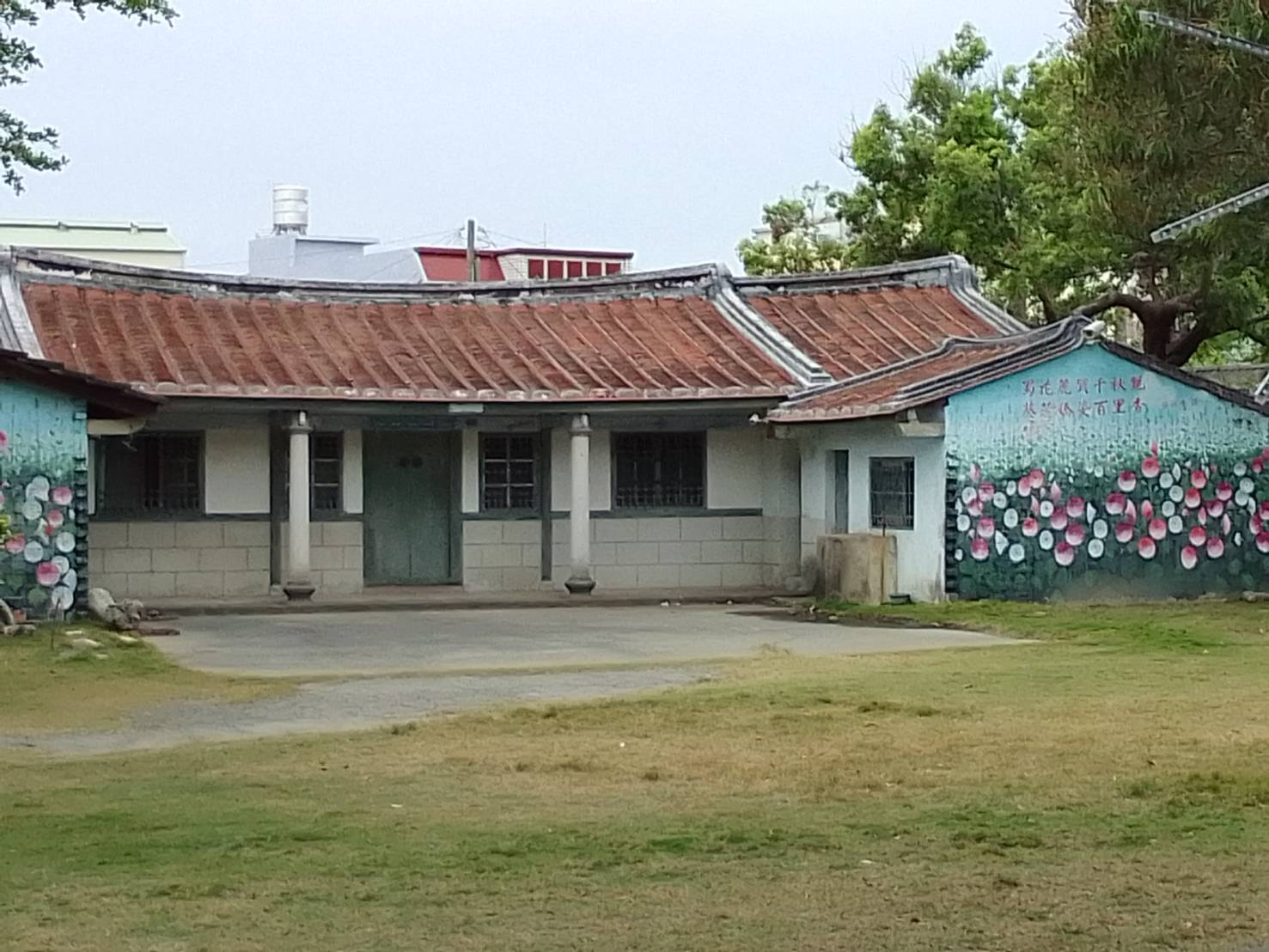
Hollyhock Cultural Festival Venue – 2

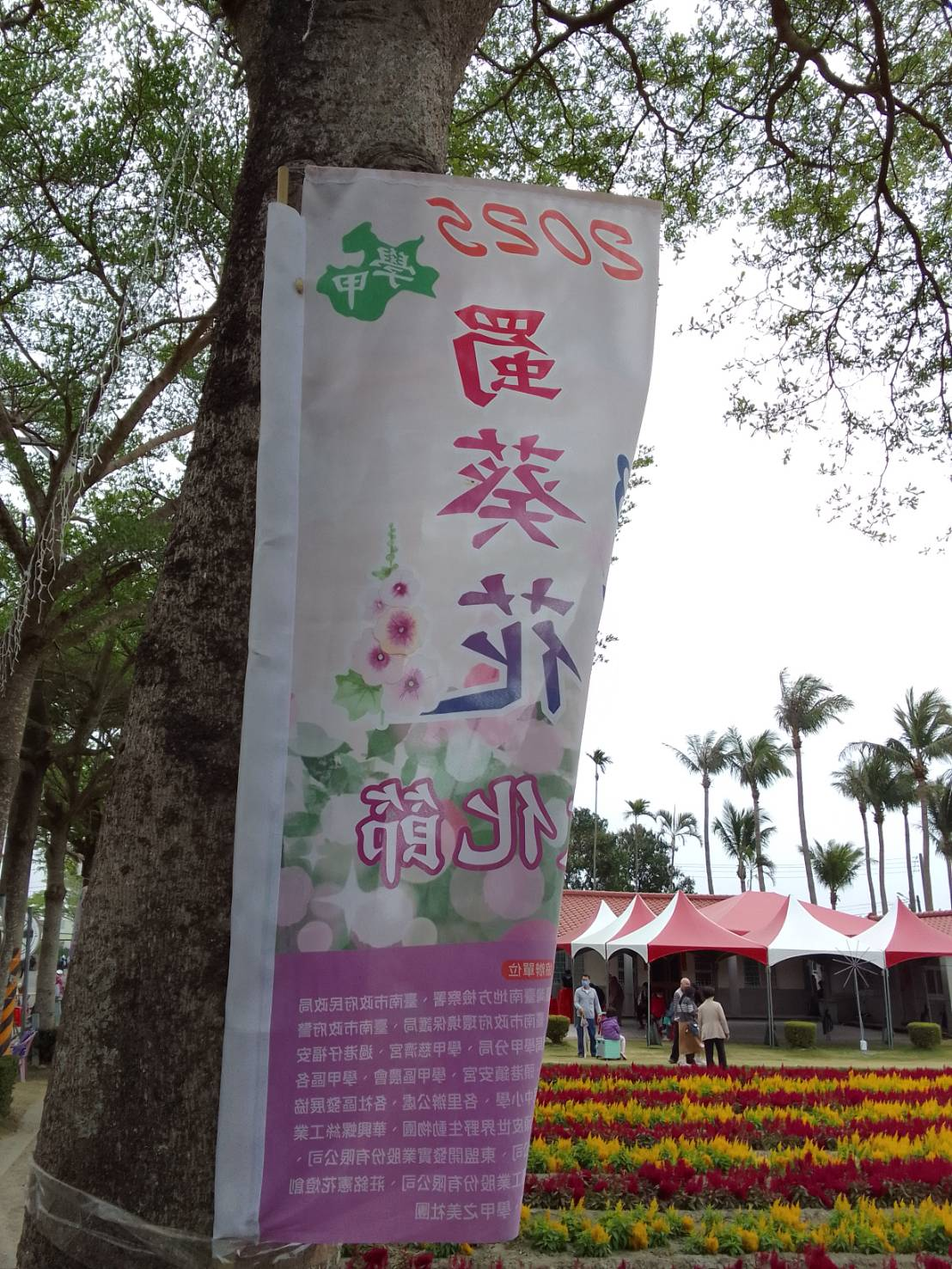
Syuejia Hollyhock Festival – Promotional Banners

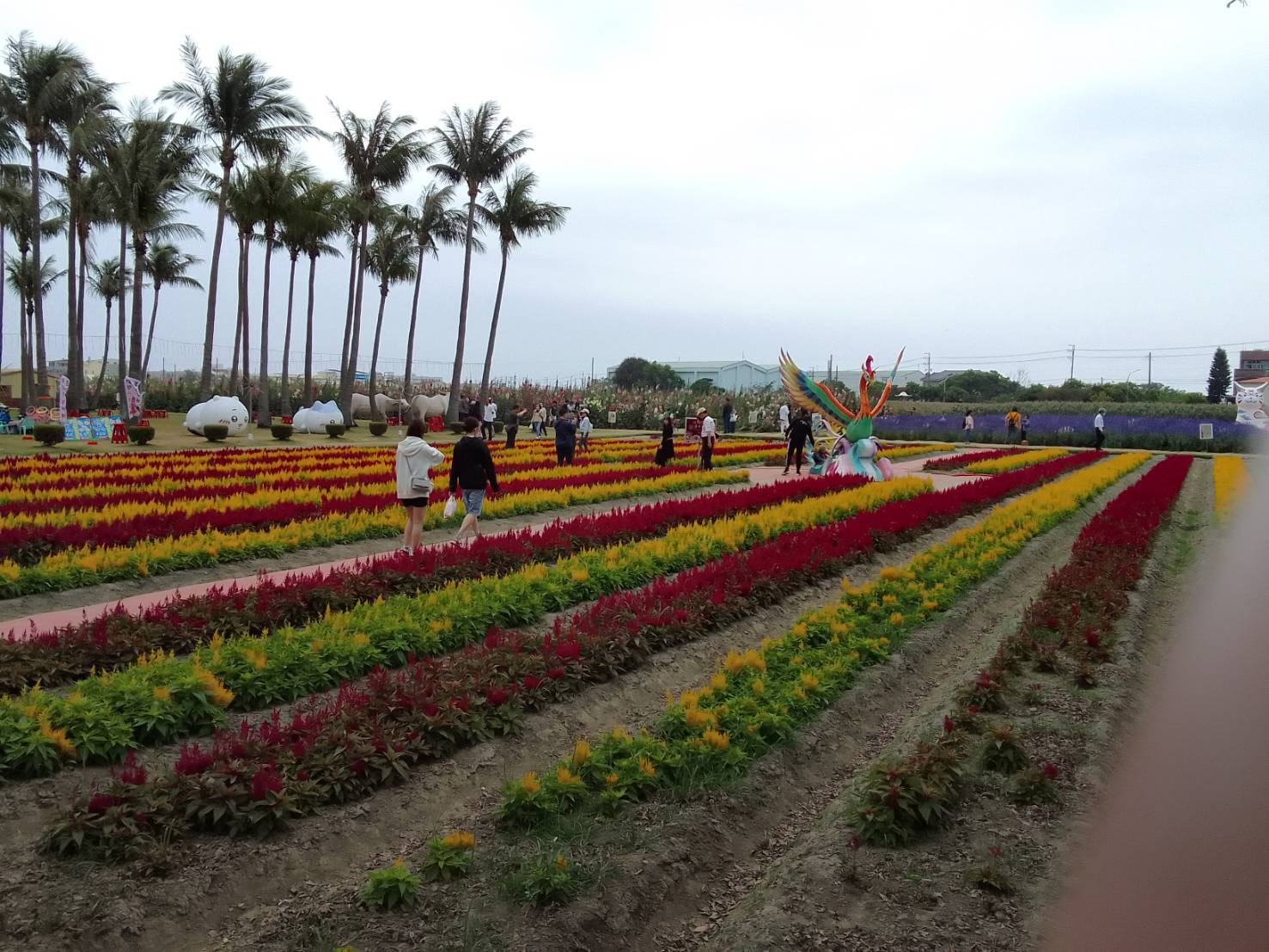
Syuejia Hollyhock Festival – Flower Fields – 2

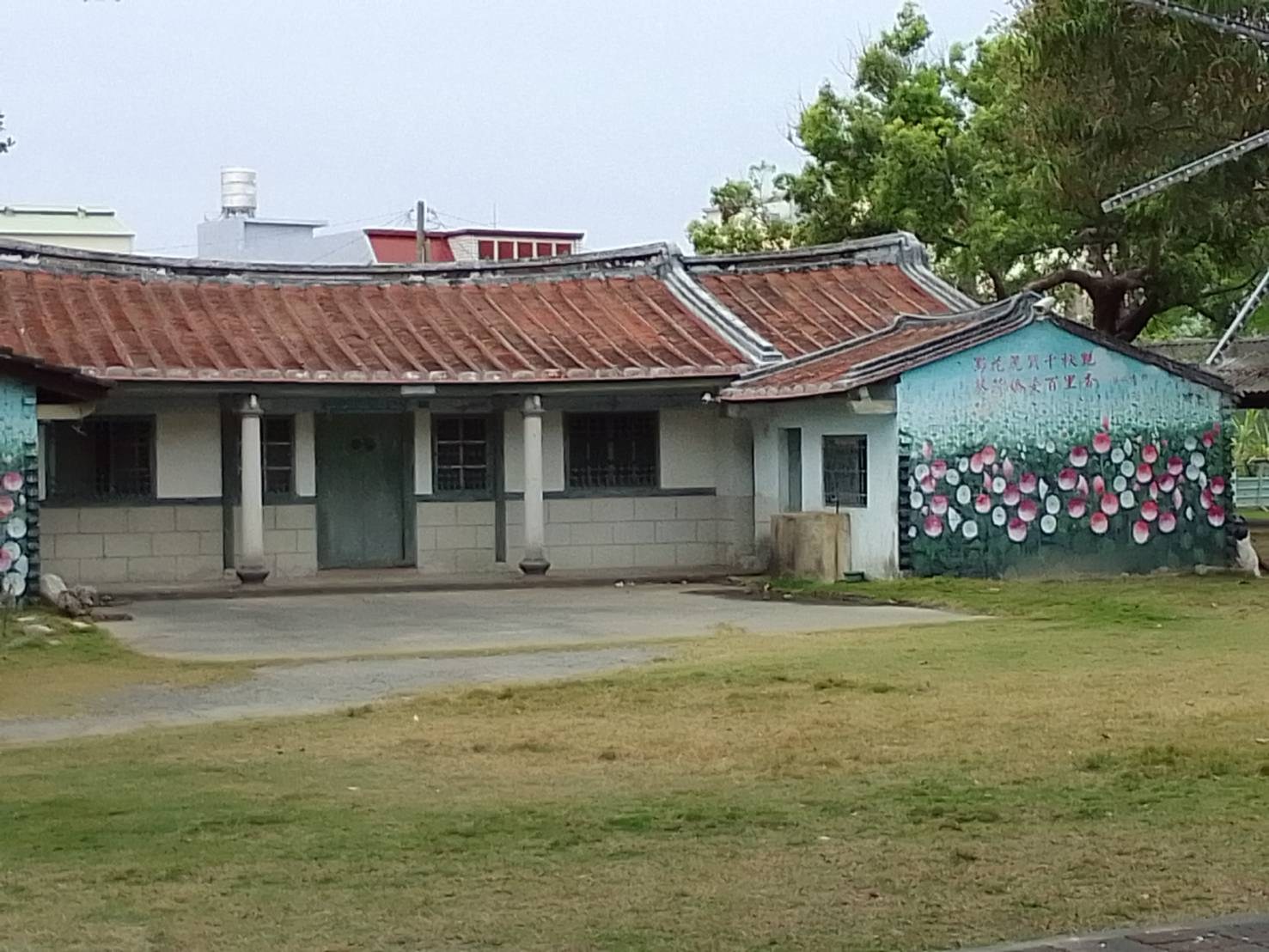
Syuejia Hollyhock Festival – Traditional Houses in the Festival Area

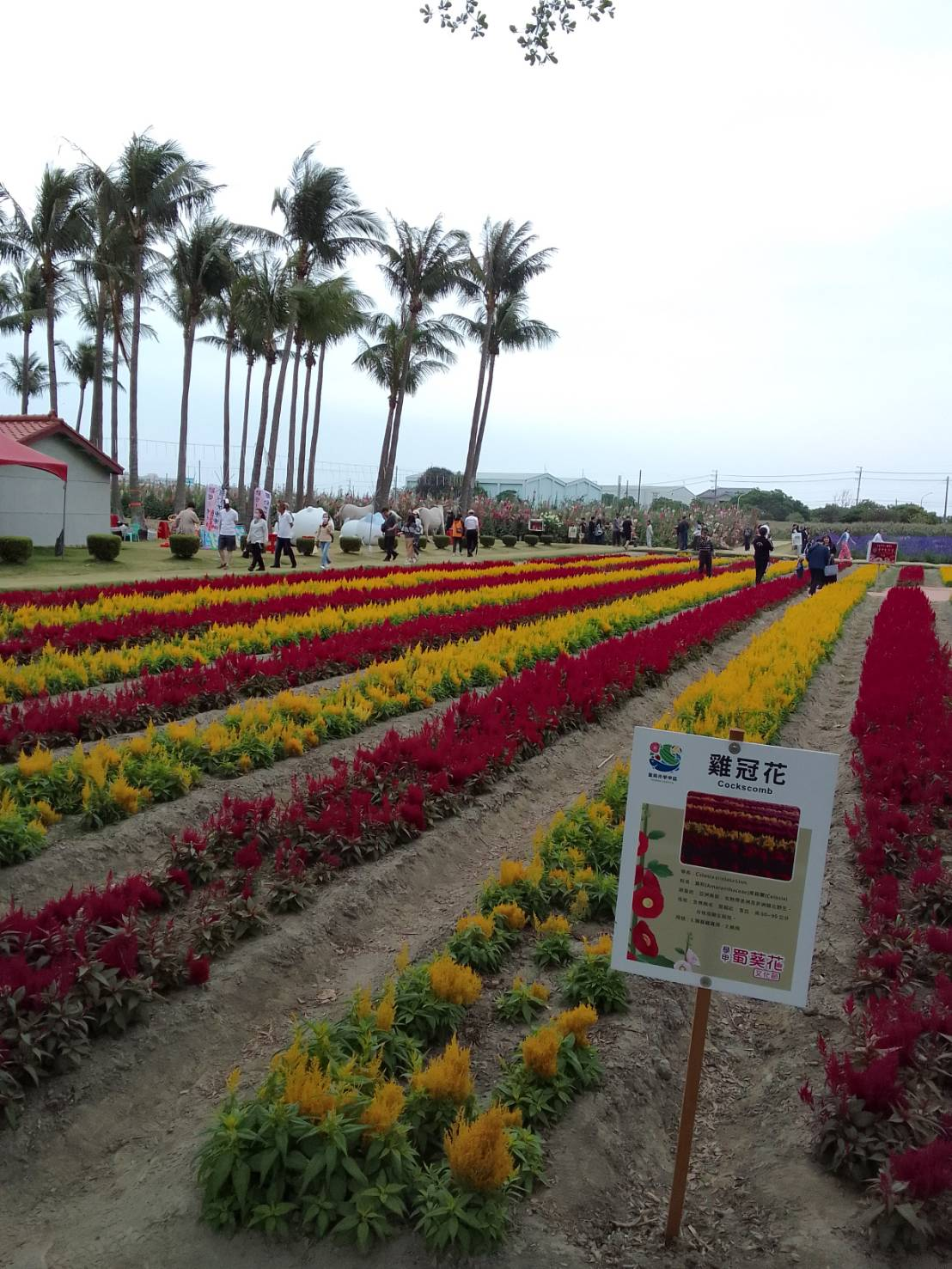
Syuejia Hollyhock Festival – Flower Fields – 1
