= Wanpi World Safari Zoo =

Zoo in Xuejia, Tainan, Taiwan

Wanpi World Zoo 頑皮世界野生動物園
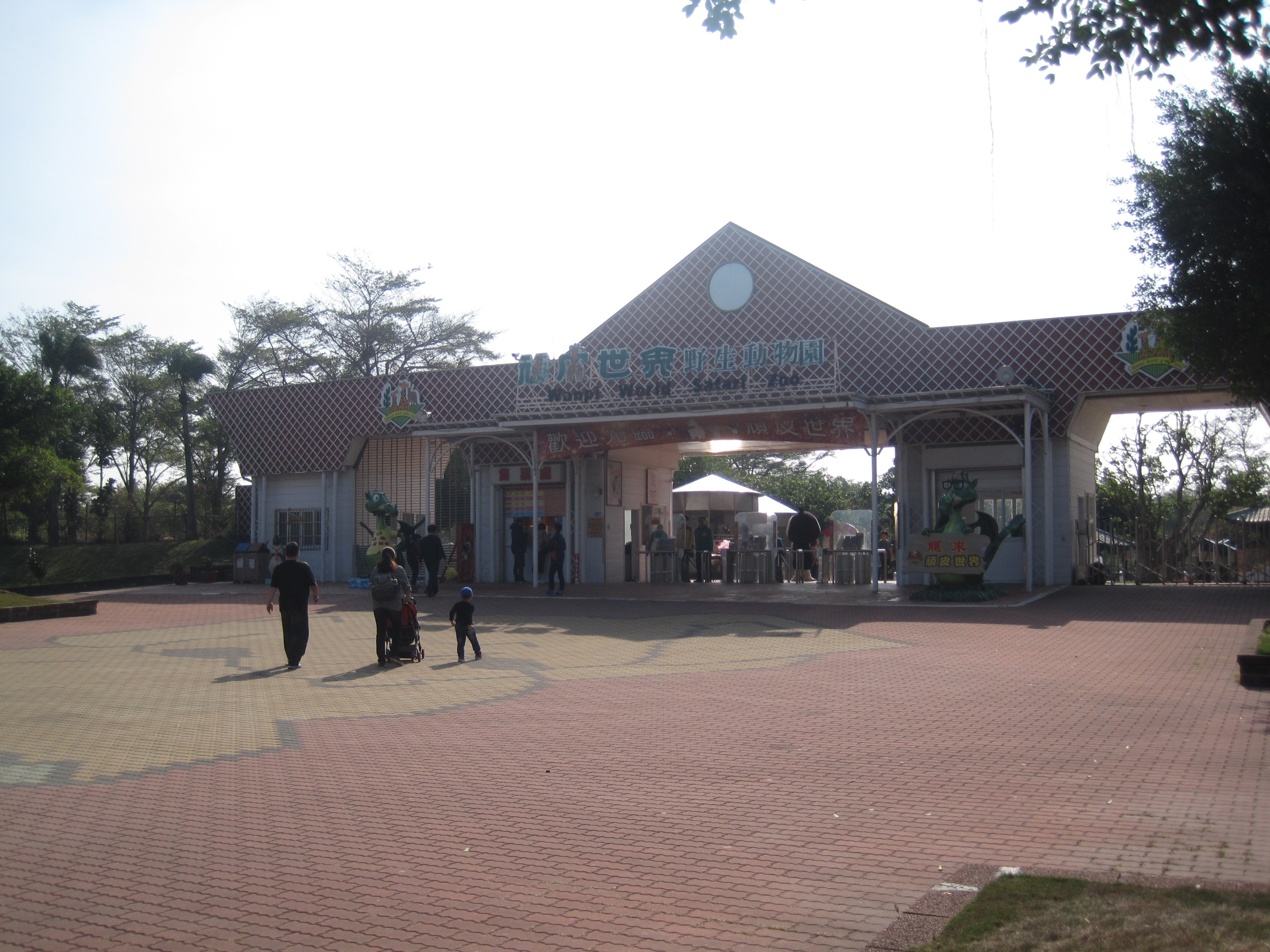
- Interactive map of Wanpi World Zoo 頑皮世界野生動物園
- 23°16′44″N 120°12′34″E
- Date opened: 1994
- Location: Syuejia, Tainan, Taiwan
- Land area: 20 hectares
- Public transit: Xinying Station
- Website: Official website (in Chinese)

The Wanpi World Safari Zoo (traditional Chinese: 頑皮世界野生動物園; simplified Chinese: 顽皮世界野生动物园; pinyin: Wánpí Shìjiè Yěshēng Dòngwùyuán) is a zoo in Sanqing Village, Syuejia District, Tainan, Taiwan.

== History ==
The zoo was established in 1994 for tourism, research, conservation, entertainment and education.

== Attractions ==
There are over 300 animals kept at the zoo, in which it has the largest amphibious reptile collections in the world with more than 200 species. It also features some endangered animals. The zoo includes the following features:

- Animal show
- Camel riding area
- Komodo dragon area

== Careness ==
In 2021, it has been reported that 4 giraffes died in the last decade. Animal rights group advocates stopping animal import until the environment is well considered.

== Transportation ==
The zoo is accessible by taxi from Xinying Station of Taiwan Railway.

== See also ==
- List of tourist attractions in Taiwan
