= Science Noodles =

Instant noodle brand

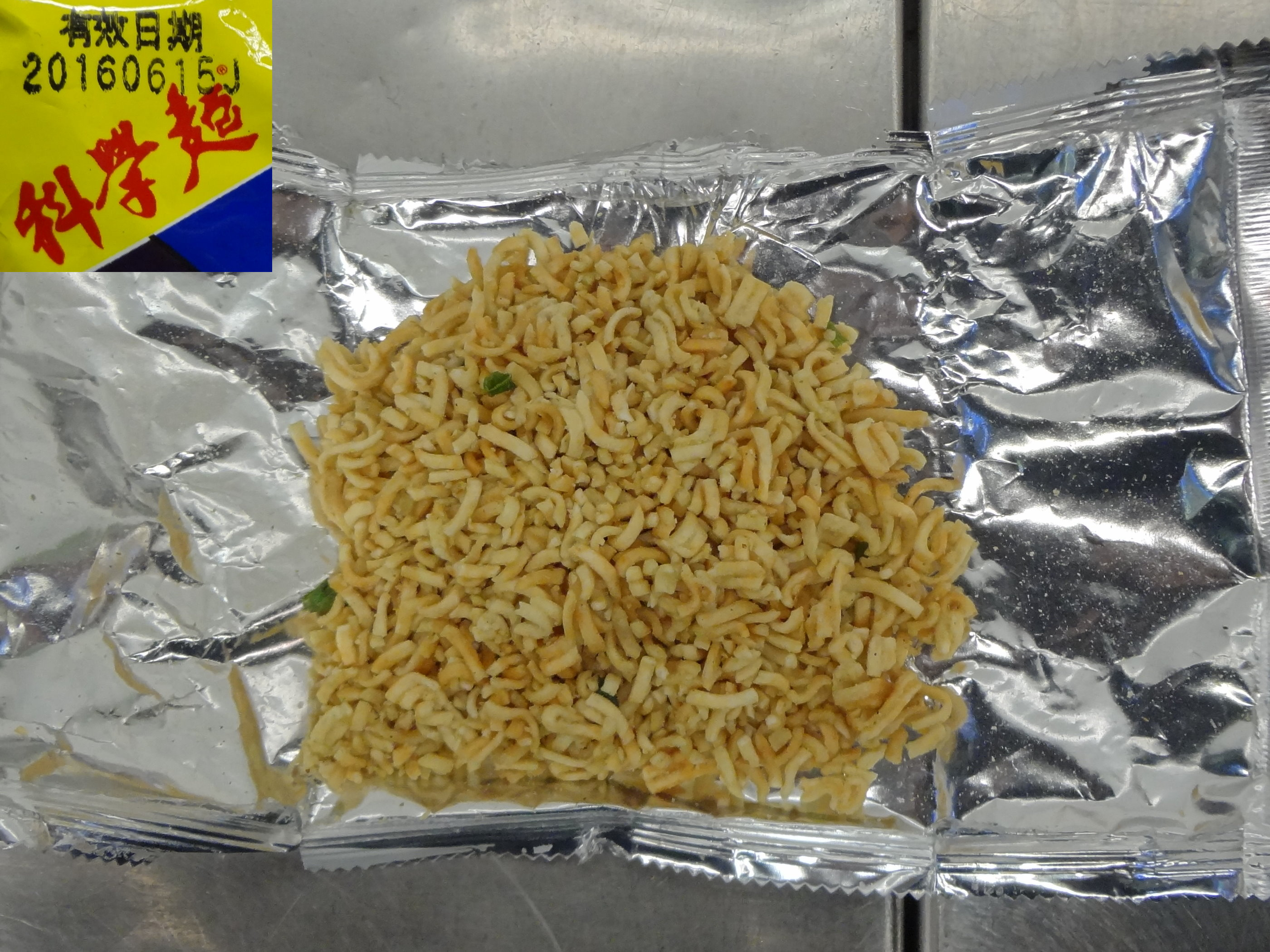
- Science Noodles Mini Pack interior
- Product type: Instant noodles, snack
- Produced by: Uni-President Enterprises Corporation
- Country: Taiwan

Science Noodles (traditional Chinese: 科學麵; simplified Chinese: 科学面; pinyin: kēxuémiàn; lit. 'Science Noodles') are a brand of instant noodle that is marketed in Taiwan by the Uni-President Enterprises Corporation. Unlike normal instant noodles, they are usually eaten without cooking the noodles. Instead, the bag is crushed with the ramen noodles inside, and seasoning added using the included spices. In fact, the real popularity of Science Noodles lies in this method of consumption, as it is eaten like a snack food. Because of this, most packaging no longer contains instructions for cooking the noodles.

== History ==
Science Noodles entered the market in 1970, known as the brand "Taiwan Instant Noodles." In the 1970s Taiwan market lacked many consumer goods, so children's snacks were rare. However, at the time a pack of Science Noodles was only 2.5 NT$, which created demand as a children's snack.

The name 'Science Noodles' came into being after the Japanese animated franchise Science Ninja Team Gatchaman, broadcast by China Television from 1977 to 1978, which quickly gained popularity.

By the mid-1980s, Science Noodles began to compete with the more favored instant noodle brand, Prince Noodles. Despite the competition between the two, Taiwanese consumers tended to purchase the former due to its larger portion compared with the latter.

== See also ==
- List of instant noodle brands
- List of noodles
