= Books.com.tw =

E-commerce company based in Taiwan

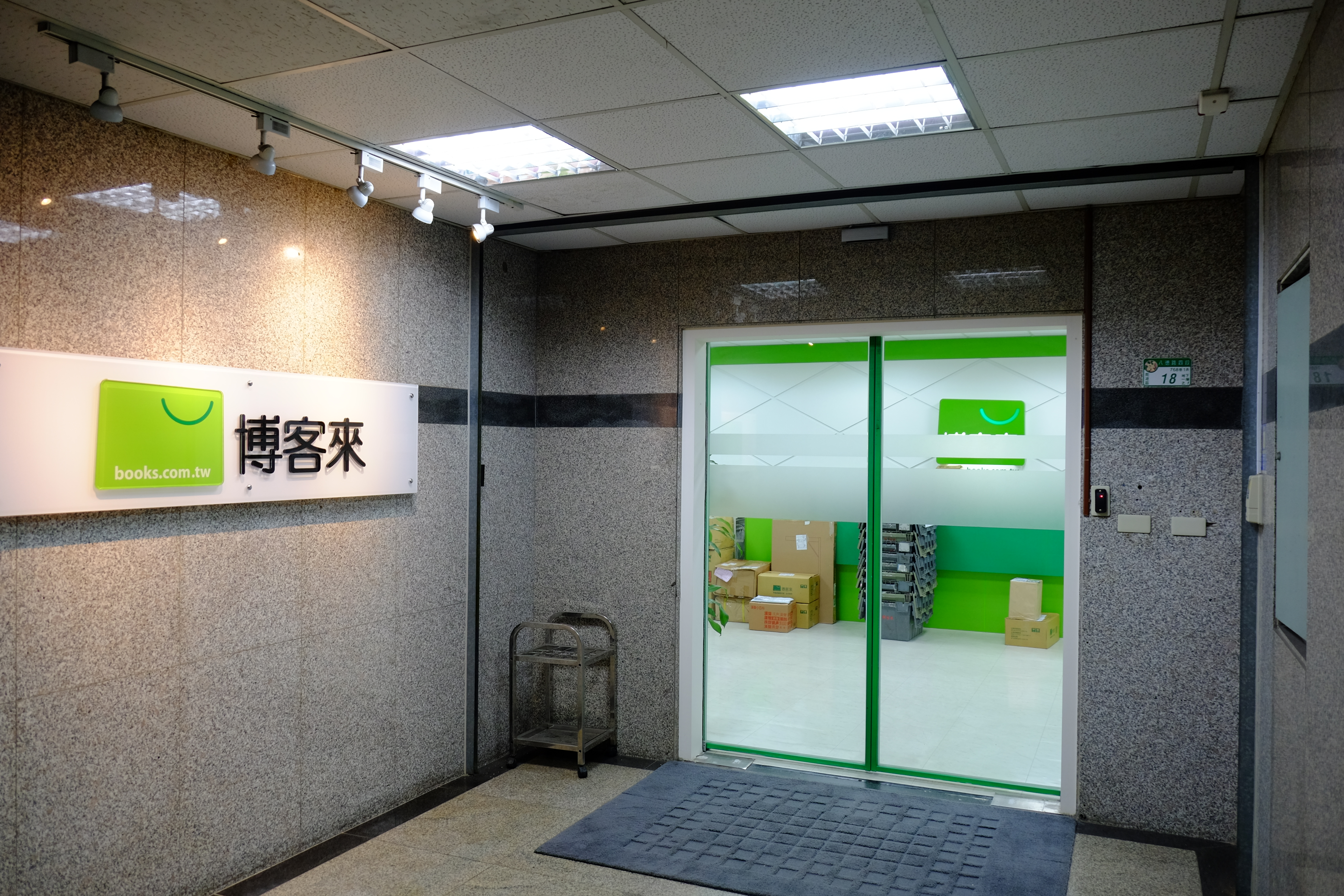
The entrance to Books.com.tw's headquarters

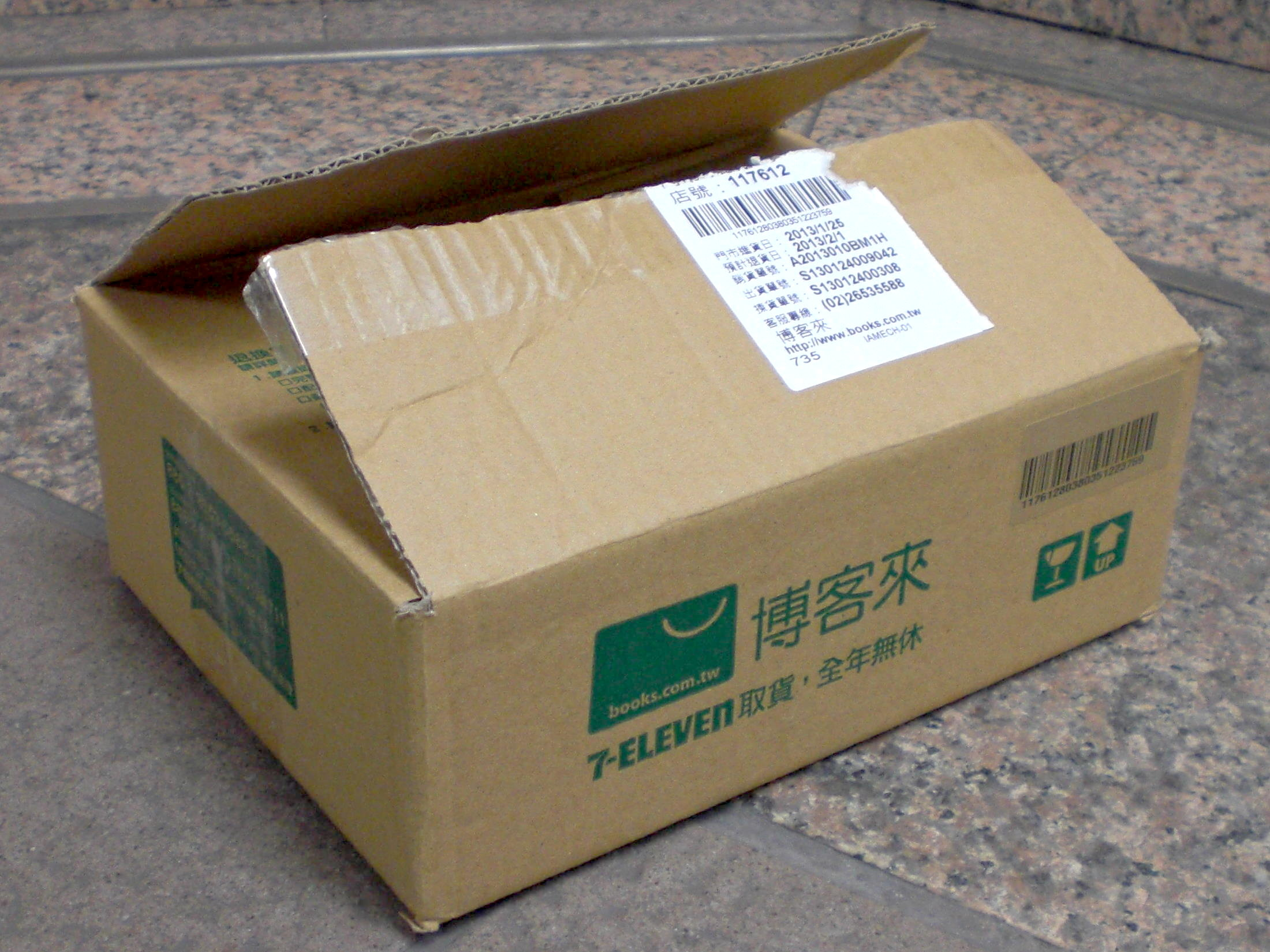
A package delivered from Books.com.tw. (DHL is used to overseas.)

Books.com.tw or Pok'elai (Chinese: 博客來), originally established as an online bookstore, is Taiwan's largest Internet retailer.

== History ==
- 1995: Terry Chang (Chinese: 張天立), who had graduated from National Taiwan University (math) and had had graduate study at Pennsylvania State University (computer) and Rutgers University (business), started the first online bookstore of the Sinophone area, and established Pok'elai Digital Science & Technology Co., Ltd., by the year-end. This was within one year of the establishment of Amazon.com.
- 1996: Books.com.tw (博客來網路書店) officially started its business.
- 2000: started "Order to Books.com.tw and receive/pay at Uni-President Enterprises Corporation's 7-Eleven store" service .
- 2001: Uni-President Enterprises invested in Books.com.tw.
- 2004: Simplified Chinese books, published in China, were sold in addition to Traditional Chinese books, published in Taiwan.
- 2005: Yamato Transport's Tanwan subsidiary began to be used for delivery to the customers.
- 2013: Listed as one of Taiwan's 100 Largest Companies for the fifth year. Exceeded five million customers (cumulative).
- 2014: In Hong Kong, started "Order to Books.com.tw and receive/pay at Dairy Farm's 7-Eleven store" service.
- 2025: It opened its first 24-hour physical store located in Dream Plaza, Taipei.

== Okapi ==
In 2010, Book.com.tw launched an online magazine Okapi (Chinese: OKAPI閱讀生活誌), which offers news and reviews about books, along with interviews with writers. As of December 2022, Okapi featured more than 20,000 reviews, making it the largest book review database in the Sinosphere.

== Competitors ==
- YesAsia.com
- Sanmin Online Bookstore

== See also ==
- Uni-President Enterprises Corporation
- Yamato Transport'
- Dairy Farm International Holdings
