= Uni-President China =

Chinese beverages and instant noodles supplier

Uni-President China Holdings Limited 統一企業中國控股有限公司
- Company type: Privately owned company (Taiwanese enterprise)
- Industry: Foods
- Founded: 1992; 34 years ago
- Headquarters: Shanghai, China
- Area served: China
- Key people: Chairman and CEO: Mr. Lo Chih-Hsien
- Products: instant noodles, non-carbonated beverages
- Parent: Uni-President Enterprises Corporation
- Website: Uni-President China Holdings Limited; Uni-President China Holdings Limited

Uni-President China Holdings Limited (Chinese: 統一企業中國控股有限公司) (SEHK: 220) is the largest juice drinks producer and the third largest instant noodles supplier in China. It is the mainland China subsidiary of Uni-President Enterprises Corporation (Chinese: 統一企業公司), the largest processed food producer in Taiwan. It engages in the manufacture and sale of non-carbonated beverages and instant noodles.

== History ==
The company was established in 1992. It is incorporated in the Cayman Islands and is headquartered in Shanghai. It was listed on the Hong Kong Stock Exchange in 2007 with its IPO price at HK$4.22 per share.

In May 2014, the Uni-President China Holding Group came back to Taipei Exchange to issue Baodao Debt, becoming the first Taishang company to issue the Baodao Debt.

== Related events ==
In 2013, the UK's Economist reported that researchers found that the mainland China government's subsidy for unified control accounted for 18.2% of its 2011 net profit, which was approximately US$ 9 million (approximately NT$ 276 million).

== See also ==
- Uni-President Enterprises Corporation
