= Kao Ching-yuen =

Taiwanese businessman

- 高清愿
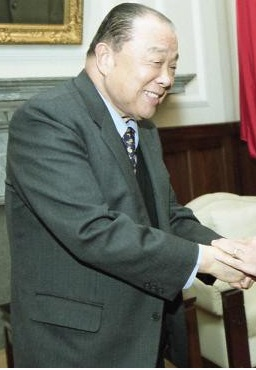
- Born: 24 May 1929; Hokumon, Tainan, Taiwan, Empire of Japan
- Died: March 2016 (aged 86); Yongkang District, Tainan, Taiwan
- Citizenship: Taiwan
- Awards: Order of Brilliant Star (2nd Class)

Kao Ching-yuen (Chinese: 高清愿; pinyin: Gāo Qīngyuàn; Pe̍h-ōe-jī: Ko Chheng-gōan; 24 May 1929 – March 2016) was a Taiwanese businessman best known as the founder of Uni-President Enterprises Corporation.

== Biography ==
Kao was born to a poor family in Gakkō Village, Hokumon District, Tainan Prefecture, Japanese-era Taiwan (modern-day Syuejia, Tainan) on 24 May 1929. In 1942, at the age of 13, Kao began working in a sandal factory. In 1946, he joined a firm owned by his cousin-in-law Wu Hsiu-chi, the Xinhexing Cloth Shop (新和興布行), as an apprentice before starting his own company, Dexing Cloth Shop (德兴布行), in 1949.

He joined Tainan Spinning (台南紡織), a textile processing company founded by Wu Hsiu-chi, in 1955 as a sales manager.

Kao left Tainan Spinning in 1967 to establish the Uni-President Corporation, and served as company chairman until 2013.

In 1997, he was awarded an Honorary Doctor of Management from National Sun Yat-sen University (NSYSU) and an Order of Brilliant Star (2nd Class) award on 23 December 1999. In 2003, he was awarded a Management Medal by the Chinese Management Association.

Kao's death was confirmed by Uni-President on 1 April 2016, and a funeral was held the same day.
