= Uni-President Enterprises Corporation =

Taiwanese food company

Uni-President Enterprises Corporation 統一企業公司
- Type: Public
- Traded as: TWSE: 1216
- Industry: Food production
- Founded: 1967; 59 years ago
- Founder: Kao Ching-yuen
- Headquarters: Yongkang, Tainan, Taiwan
- Area served: Worldwide
- Key people: Alex Lo (President)
- Products: Dairy products Beverages; Snack foods Instant noodles
- Revenue: ▲NT$456 billion (2013)
- Number of employees: 188,931
- Subsidiaries: President Chain Store (7-Eleven Taiwan); COSMED books.com.tw Dream Mall
- Website: www.uni-president.com.tw

Uni-President Enterprises Corporation
- Traditional Chinese: 統一企業公司
- Simplified Chinese: 统一企业公司
Transcriptions
Standard Mandarin
- Hanyu Pinyin: Tǒngyī Qǐyè Gōngsī
- Wade–Giles: T'ung^{3}-i^{1} Chi^{4}-yeh^{4} Kung^{1}-szu^{1}
- Tongyong Pinyin: Tǒngyī Cǐyè Gōngsīh
- Yale Romanization: Tǔngyī Chǐyè Gūngsz̄
- IPA: [tʰʊ̀ŋí tɕʰîjê kʊ́ŋsɹ̩́]
Southern Min
- Hokkien POJ: Thóng-it Khì-gia̍p Kong-si

Uni-President Enterprises Corporation (Chinese: 統一企業公司; pinyin: Tǒngyī Qǐyè Gōngsī; Wade–Giles: T'ung-i Chi-yeh) is an international food conglomerate based in Tainan, Taiwan. It is the largest food production company in Taiwan and the 12th largest in the world, and has a significant market share in dairy products, foods and snacks, and beverages. Through its subsidiary company President Chain Store Corporation, it is also responsible for running Starbucks, 7-Eleven, Mister Donut, Carrefour and Muji in Taiwan, making it Taiwan's largest retail operator. In addition, Uni-President has subsidiaries in the United States, mainland China, Vietnam, South Korea, Malaysia, Thailand and the Philippines.

== History ==
In 1967, the "President Enterprise Corporation" was founded in Syuejia, Tainan County by Kao Ching-yuen. It started with the production of flour and feed.

In 1969, Uni-President began preparations for the production of instant noodles and cooperated with Nissin Milling Technology to that end, and subsequently invested and set up factories in Thailand and established dealers in Hong Kong.

In 1989, Uni-President formed the Uni-President Lions, a professional baseball team playing in the Chinese Professional Baseball League.

In 1992, Uni-President established a subsidiary on mainland China, Uni-President China.

In July 2024, Uni-President received approval from the Taiwan Fair Trade Commission to acquire an 80% majority stake in Yahoo's Taiwan e-commerce business for US$100 million. The deal was closed on September 19, 2024.

== Brands ==
=== Books.com.tw ===
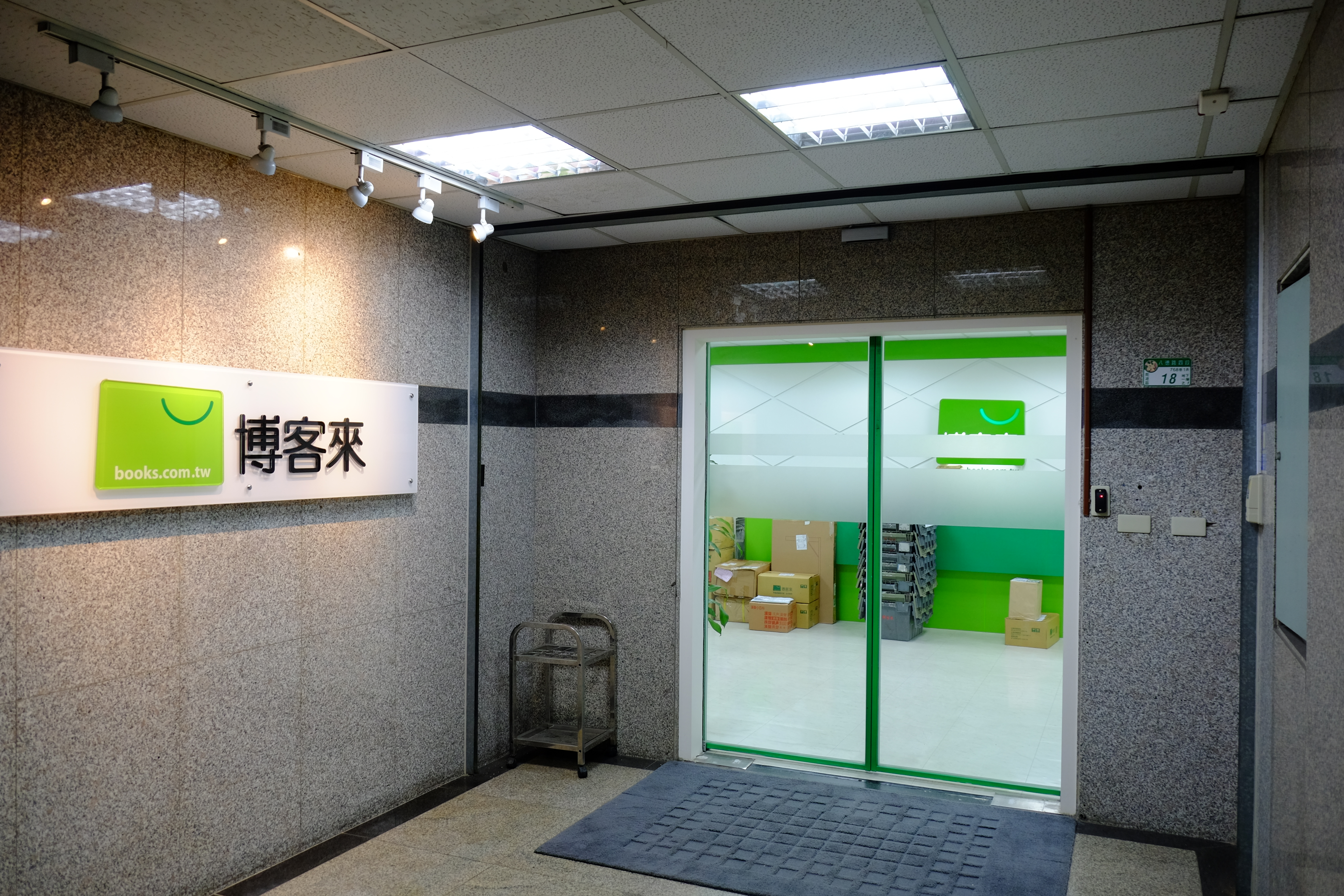
The entrance to Books.com.tw's headquarters

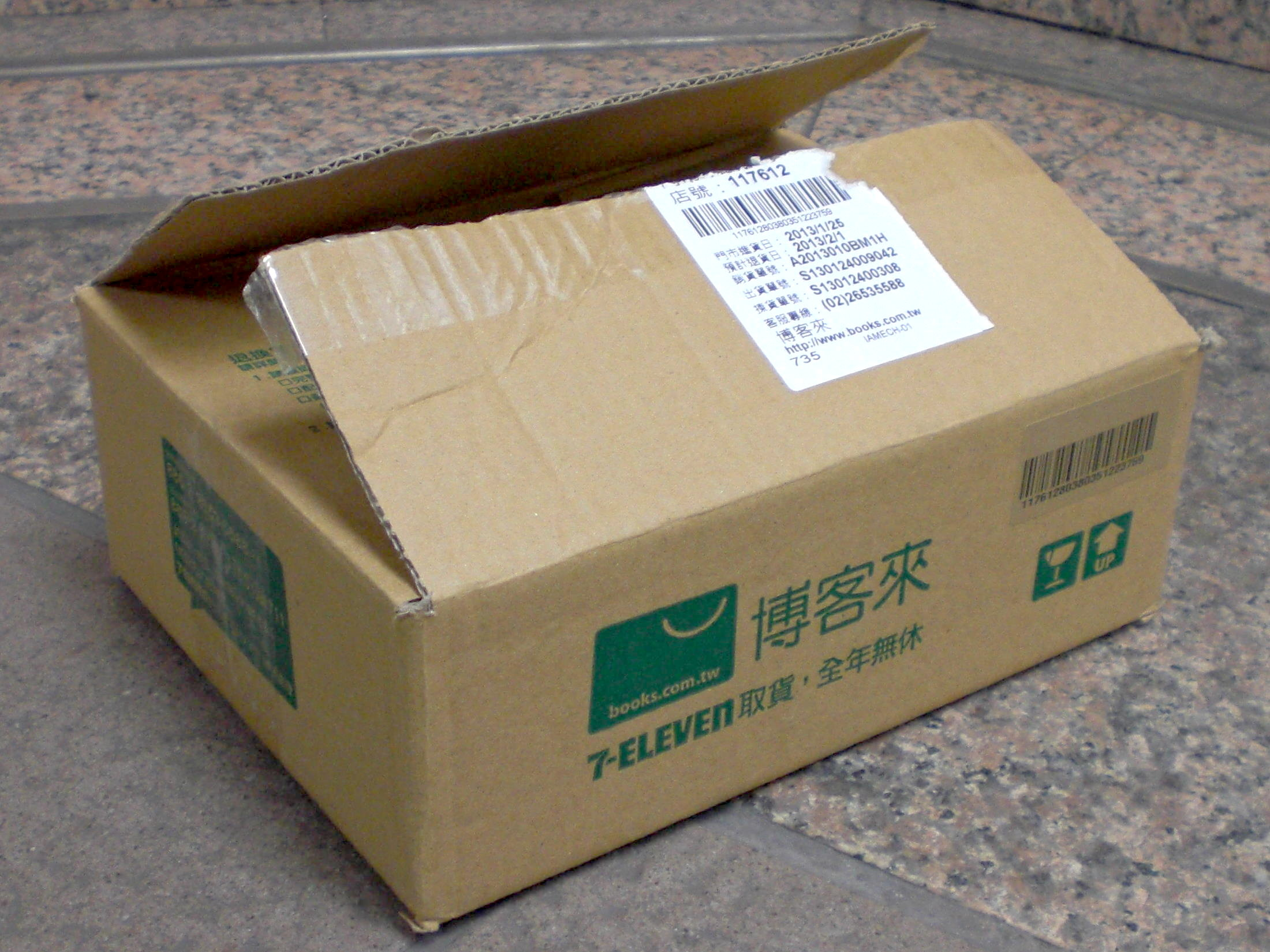
A package delivered from Books.com.tw. (DHL is used to overseas.)

Books.com.tw or Pok'elai (Chinese: 博客來), originally established as an online bookstore, is Taiwan's largest Internet retailer.

=== Science Noodles ===
Science Noodles (traditional Chinese: 科學麵; simplified Chinese: 科学面; pinyin: kēxuémiàn; lit. 'Science Noodles') are a brand of instant noodle that is marketed in Taiwan by the Uni-President Enterprises Corporation. Unlike normal instant noodles, they are usually eaten without cooking the noodles. Instead, the bag is crushed with the ramen noodles inside, and seasoning added using the included spices. In fact, the real popularity of Science Noodles lies in this method of consumption, as it is eaten like a snack food. Because of this, most packaging no longer contains instructions for cooking the noodles.

== See also ==
- List of companies of Taiwan
- Dream Mall
- T&T Supermarket (former Canadian joint venture between Uni-President and Tawa Supermarket Inc.; now owned by Loblaw Companies)
- Books.com.tw
