= Syuejia District =

District in Tainan, Taiwan

Syuejia 學甲區
- District
- Hsuehchia
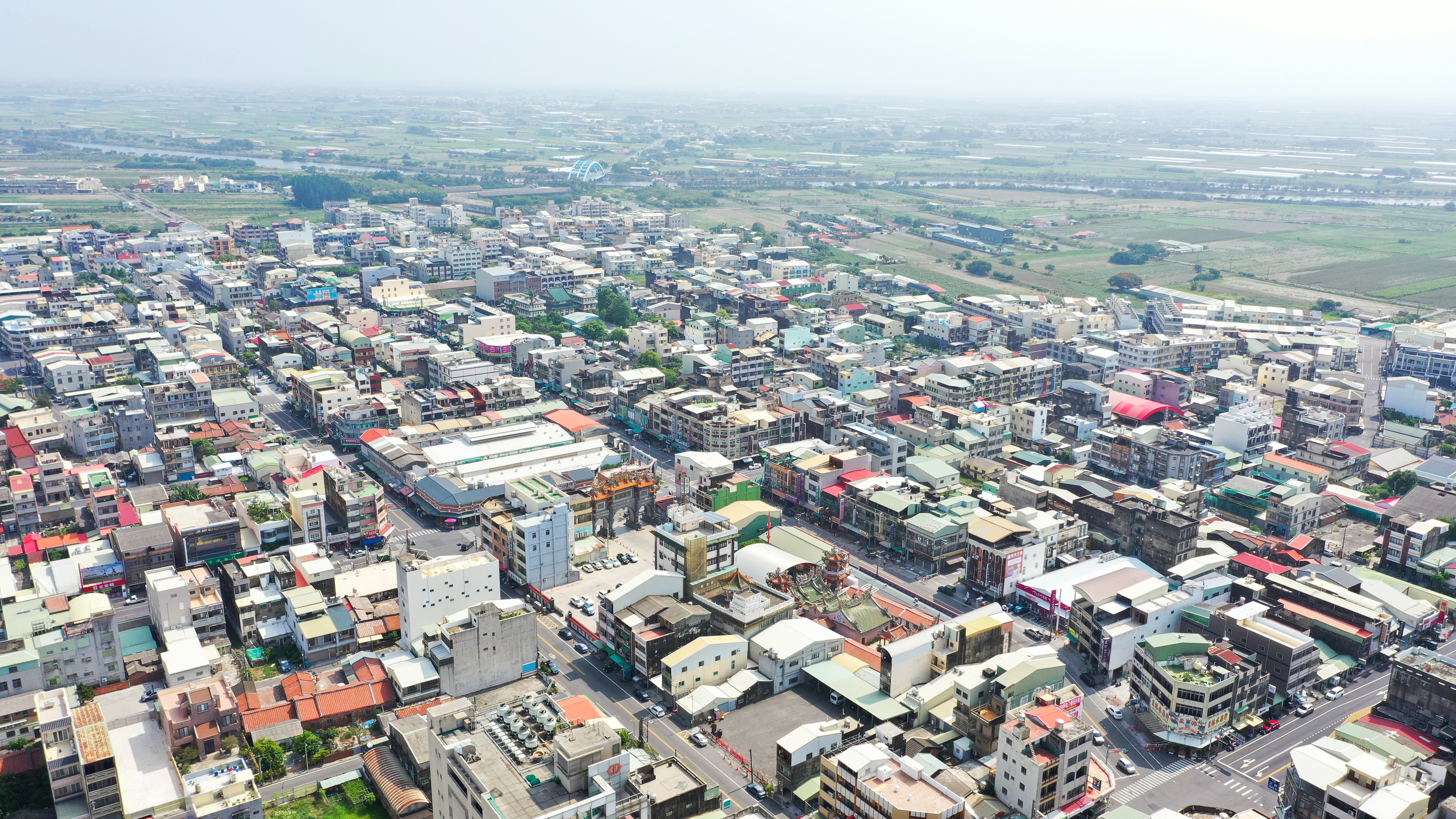

- 臺南市學甲區公所; Syuejia District Office; Tainan City

- Syuejia District in Tainan City
- Location: Tainan, Taiwan

Area
  - Total: 54 km^{2} (21 sq mi)

Population (May 2022)
  - Total: 24,857
  - Density: 460/km^{2} (1,200/sq mi)
- Website: syuejia.tainan.gov.tw/en/

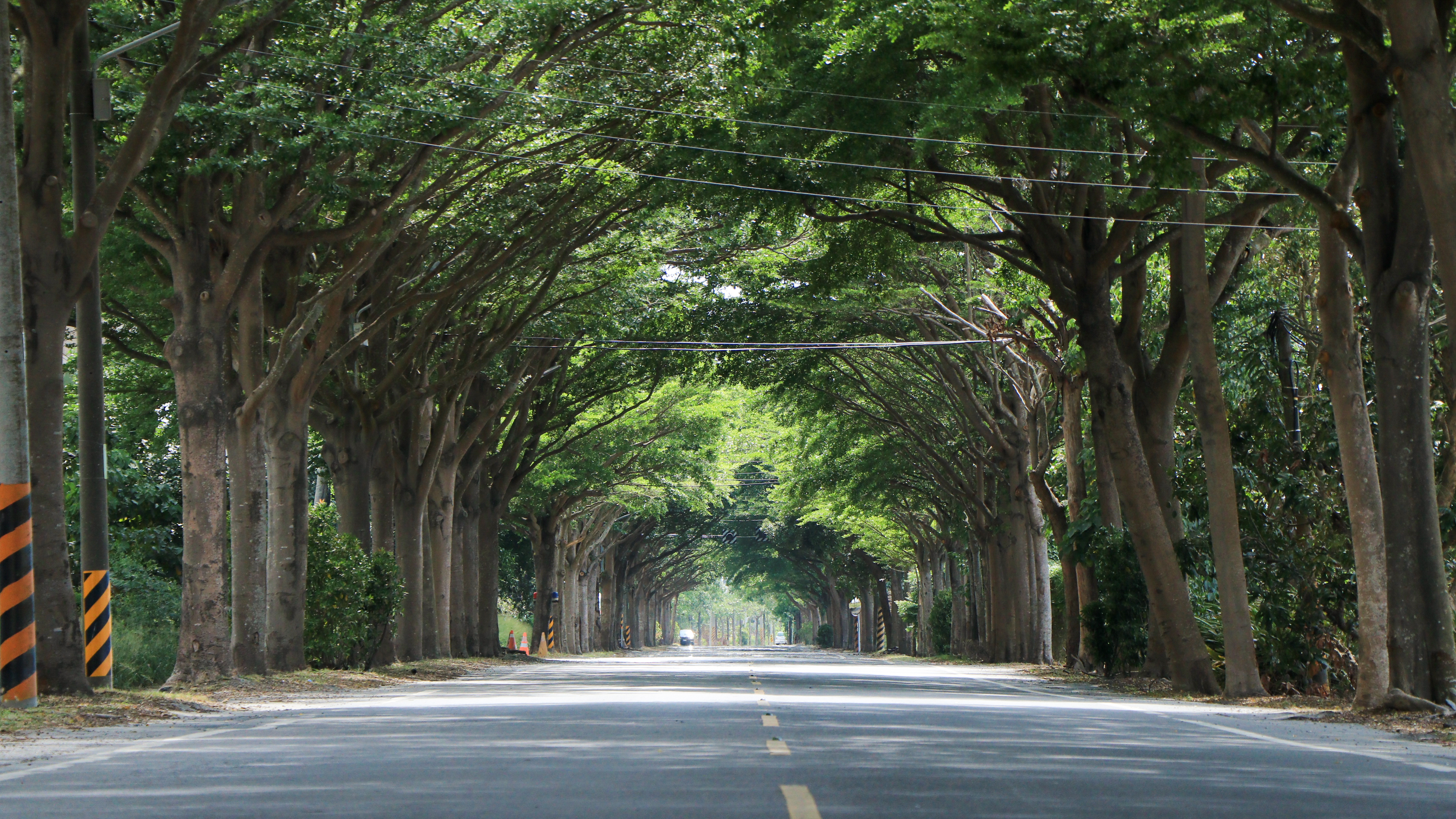
Tree tunnel in Syuejia

Syuejia District (Chinese: 學甲區; Hanyu Pinyin: Xuéjiǎ Qū; Tongyong Pinyin: Syuéjiǎ Cyu; Pe̍h-ōe-jī: Ha̍k-kah-khu), alternatively spelled Xuejia, is a district of about 24,857 residents in Tainan City, Taiwan.

== Name ==
The name of the district means "excellent academic achievement", in which the word 學 (syué/xué) means academics, and the word 甲(jiǎ) is the top grade in the traditional Taiwanese grading system.

== History ==
Syuejia was originally inhabited by the Siraya people. During Japanese rule, Syuejia was part of Tainan Prefecture. After the handover of Taiwan from Japan to the Republic of China in 1945, Syuejia was organized as a rural township of Tainan County. On 2 February 1968, Syuejia was upgraded from rural township to urban township due to its population. On 25 December 2010, Tainan County merged with Tainan City and Syuejia was upgraded to a district of the city.

== Administrative divisions ==
Xiuchang, Mingyi, Cifu, Rende, Xinda, Xinrong, Dawan, Fenghe, Zhongzhou, Guanghua, Zhaigang, Pinghe and Sanqing Village.

== Education ==
- Tainan Municipal Syuejia District Syuejia Elementary School
- Tainan Municipal Syuejia District Syuejia Junior High School

== Tourist attractions ==
- Agricultural Fishery Resort
- Ciji Temple
- Leopard King Safari Zoo
- Wanpi World Safari Zoo

== Notable natives ==
- Kao Ching-yuen, founder of Uni-President Enterprises Corporation
