= Changhua Railway Hospital =

Former hospital in Taiwan

- 彰化鐵路醫院
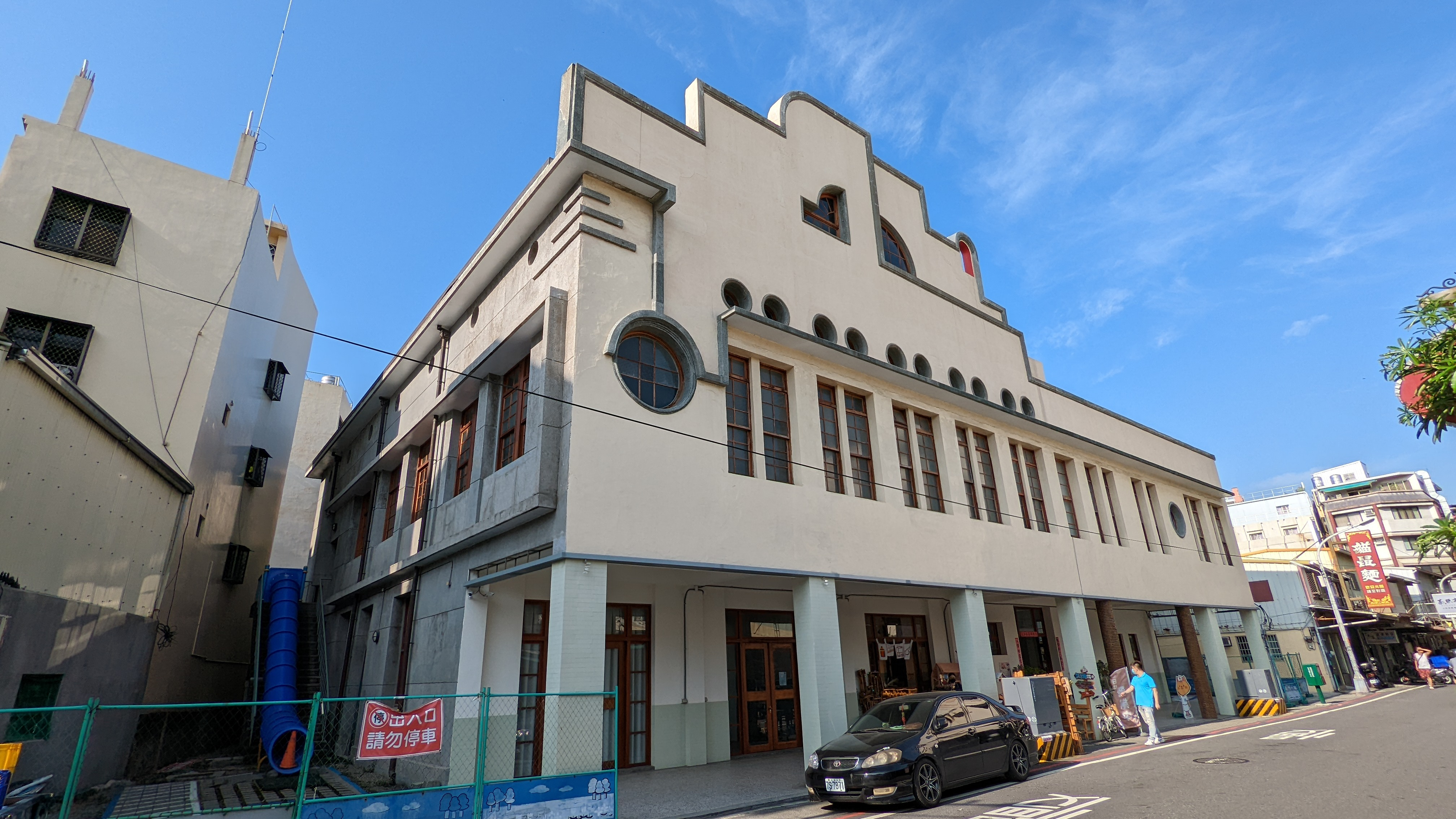
- Interactive map of the Changhua Railway Hospital area
- Former names: Kaobinge

General information
- Architectural style: modern
- Location: Changhua City, Changhua County, Taiwan, Chenleng Road, No. 228
- Coordinates: 24°4′46.9″N 120°32′19.0″E
- Construction started: 1937
- Completed: May 1938
- Renovated: 2016–2018
- Renovation cost: NT$50 million
- Owner: Taiwan Railways Administration

Technical details
- Floor count: 2

Design and construction
- Architect: Wei Lin-mu
- Developer: Chang Shih-fan

The Changhua Railway Hospital (Chinese: 彰化鐵路醫院; pinyin: Zhānghuà Tiělù Yīyuàn) is a building in Changhua City, Changhua County, Taiwan. It was completed in 1938 and opened as the restaurant Kaobinge. Between 1950 and 1984, the building served as a medical facility, taking the name Changhua Railway Hospital from 1971. The Changhua County Government named it a historic heritage site in 2011.

== History ==
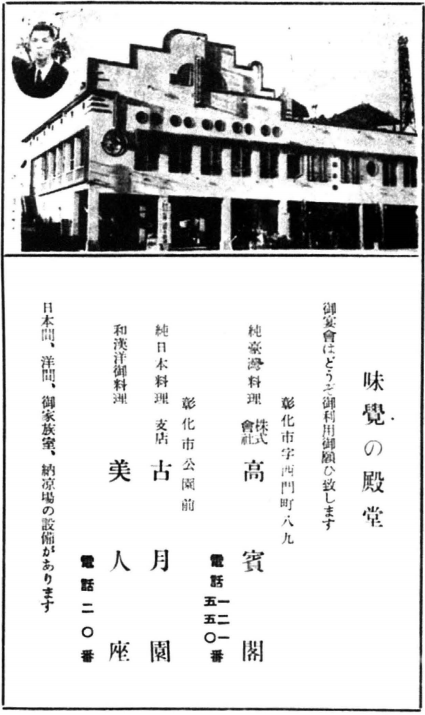
An advertisement for Kaobinge published in 1942.

=== Empire of Japan ===
On a visit to Taipei, Wang Bing-chi visited the Jiangshan Building. After he returned to Changhua, Wang Bing-chi asked his father Wang Jung-tou and Yang Hsin-yen to finance a similar project in his hometown. Further funded by a credit cooperative in Changhua, construction began in 1937. The second floor began construction on 13 January 1938, and the entire building was completed in May of that year. The project was led by a construction firm based in Changhua. The structure was designed by Chang Shih-fan. The lead architect was Wei Lin-mu. The two-story building was built in a modern architecture style. A portion of the exterior resembles a ship.

The building housed a restaurant, Kaobinge (高賓閣), which counted Loa Ho and Tu Tsung-ming as frequent patrons. While Kaobinge was in business, the first floor served as a kitchen and staff living quarters. Patrons were seated on the second floor, which included a stage. Due to the Second Sino-Japanese War effort, Kaobinge became less profitable, and was closed roughly five years after it opened. The building was acquired by the Japanese-run predecessor of the Taiwan Railways Administration. Plans to make it a railway hospital were not immediately implemented, and the building alternately housed a dormitory and office building.

=== Republic of China ===
In 1950, the building was repurposed as a medical facility. It became the Changhua Railway Hospital in 1971, which closed in 1984. The premises were then leased to a wedding studio, followed by a cafe.

In 2008, demolition of the building was discussed, to create a larger parking lot for Changhua railway station. Three years later, the Changhua County Government's Cultural Affairs Bureau named the building a county-level historic heritage site. A restoration project funded jointly by the Ministry of Culture, Changhua Cultural Affairs Bureau, and the Taiwan Railways Administration started in 2016 and was finished by 2018.
