= Shengwang Temple =

Temple in Changhua County, Taiwan

- 聖王廟
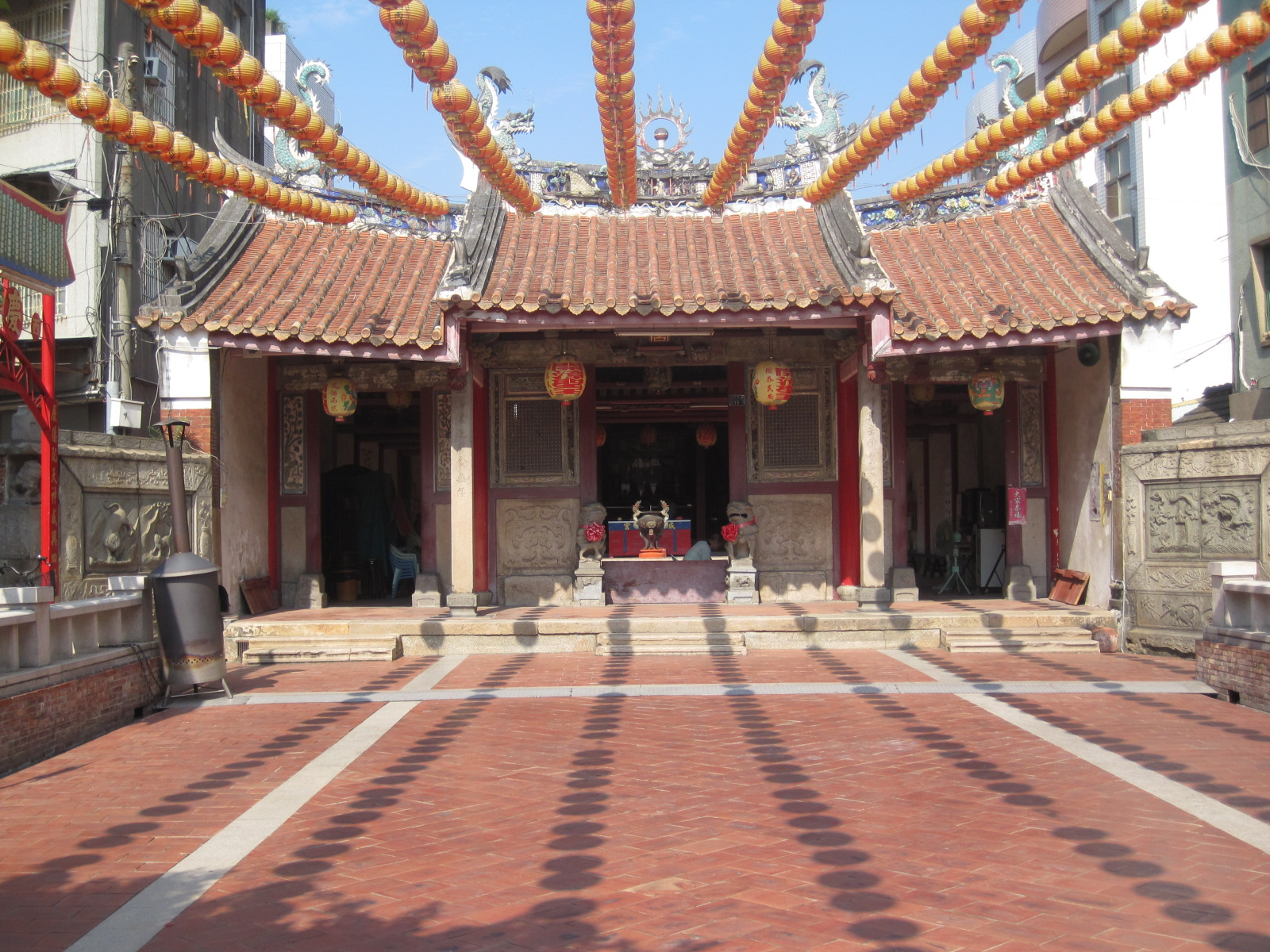

Religion
- Affiliation: Taoism
- Deity: Tan Goan-kong

Location
- Location: Changhua City, Changhua County
- Country: Taiwan
- Interactive map of Shengwang Temple
- Coordinates: 24.0770°N 120.5386°E

Architecture
- Completed: 1761
- Direction of façade: West
- National monument of Taiwan
- Type: Temple
- Designated: 27 November 1985

Shengwang Temple (Chinese: 聖王廟; pinyin: Shèngwáng Miào) is a temple located in Changhua City, Changhua County, Taiwan. The temple is dedicated to Kaizhang Shengwang or Tan Goan-kong, a Tang dynasty official who was instrumental to the founding and development Zhangzhou in Fujian Province, a region where many have migrated to Taiwan from.

== History ==
Shengwang Temple was built in 1761 by Zhangzhou migrants near the west gate of Changhua's city walls and became the cultural center of the Zhangzhou population. In 1795, there was a rebellion against Qing dynasty officials organized by Quanzhou Tiandihui leader Chen Zhou-chuan. Since Zhangzhou settlers are often at odds with Quanzhou settlers, residents around Shengwang Temple aided the Qing counter-attack through the west gate. Unfortunately, Shengwang Temple was heavily damaged in the process and was not repaired until 1807. Later, there were two major renovations done in 1860 and 1912.

After World War II, Shengwang Temple was briefly used by the military for storage. Beginning in 1971, Shengwang Temple was used as a privately owned child care center until 1982, when the owners closed it due to concerns about the building's structural integrity. On 27 November 1985, Shengwang Temple was protected as a level two national monument in Taiwan, which allowed for more renovation work to be done. The rationale for the temple's protection was because of its cultural importance among Zhangzhou settlers and architectural significance.

== Architecture ==
Shengwang Temple is considered a rare surviving example of Qing dynasty Hokkien architecture. The main hall is dedicated to Tan Goan-kong, while the rear hall is dedicated to his wife. Notably, the temple contains multiple Qing era stone sculptures, including the two bazi walls (八字牆) on the exterior forming a 45 degree angle with the building, the pair of guardian lions, and the two stone columns with dragons sculpted on them. The temple also contains a plaque with the names of those who helped establish and repair the temple. In 2020, researchers discovered that the painted menshen on the doors have two additional layers underneath, the earliest of which dates from at least 1912.

== See also ==
- Kaihua Temple
- Yuanching Temple
- Nanyao Temple
- Changhua Confucian Temple
- List of national monuments of Taiwan
