= Changhua County Art Museum =

Museum in Changhua City, Changhua County, Taiwan

- 彰化縣立美術館
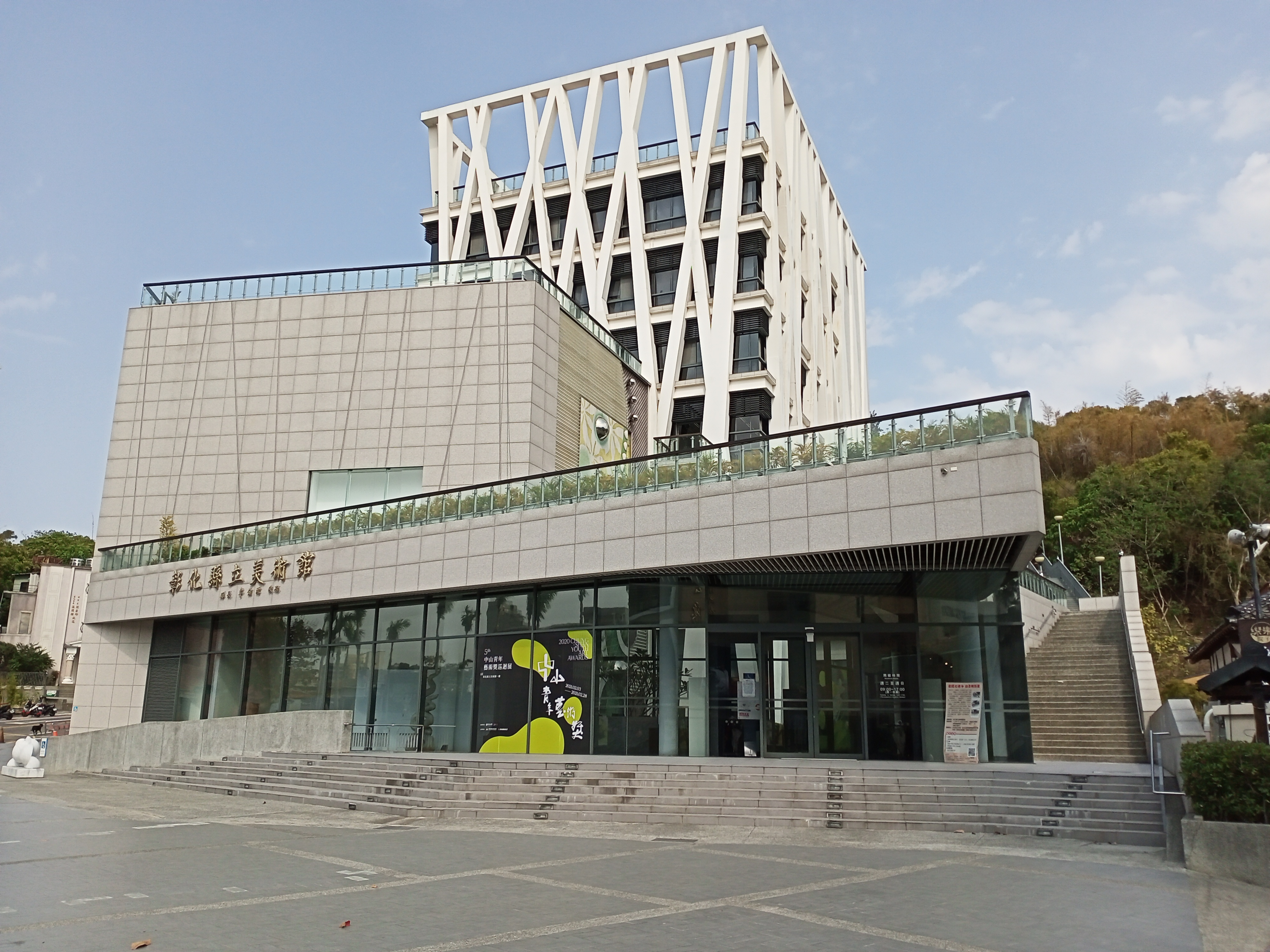
- Established: 25 November 2014
- Location: Changhua City, Changhua County, Taiwan
- Coordinates: 24°4′39.6″N 120°32′45.5″E
- Type: art museum
- Public transit access: Changhua Station
- Website: Official website (in Chinese)

The Changhua County Art Museum (traditional Chinese: 彰化縣立美術館; simplified Chinese: 彰化县立美术馆; pinyin: Zhānghuà Xiànlì Měishùguǎn) is an art museum in Changhua City, Changhua County, Taiwan.

== History ==
The museum was opened on 25 November 2014 and inaugurated by Magistrate Cho Po-yuan. The ceremony was attended by various artists from the county.

== Architecture ==
The museum is housed in an 8-story building which was constructed at a cost of NT$411 million. The building resembles an angled building with steel branches with a shape of bamboo groves and mullion windows.

== Transportation ==
The museum is accessible within walking distance south east from Changhua Station of the Taiwan Railway.

== See also ==
- List of museums in Taiwan
