= Changhua Wude Hall =

Former martial art hall in Changhua City, Taiwan

- 彰化市武德殿
- Interactive map of the Changhua Wude Hall area
- Former names: Changhua Martyrs' Shrine

General information
- Type: former martial arts hall
- Location: Changhua City, Changhua County, Taiwan
- Coordinates: 24°05′N 120°33′E
- Construction started: 1929
- Completed: 18 October 1930
- Renovated: October 2005

The Changhua Wude Hall (Chinese: 彰化市武德殿; pinyin: Zhānghuà Shì Wǔdé Diàn) is a former martial arts training center in Changhua City, Changhua County, Taiwan.

== History ==
The construction of the hall started in 1929 and was completed on 18 October 1930 during the Japanese rule of Taiwan. After the handover of Taiwan from Japan to the Republic of China in 1945, the hall was transformed into Changhua Martyrs' Shrine. The hall was partially damaged during the Jiji earthquake in 1999. During the reparation process, care was taken to maintain the building's original look. The hall was declared as a historical building on 13 December 2001. The restoration work was fully completed in October 2005.

== Transportation ==
The hall is within walking distance southeast of Changhua Station of Taiwan Railway.

== See also ==
- List of tourist attractions in Taiwan
