= Spring of Youth (Taiwan) =

Former water source in Changhua City, Changhua County, Taiwan

- 彰化不老泉
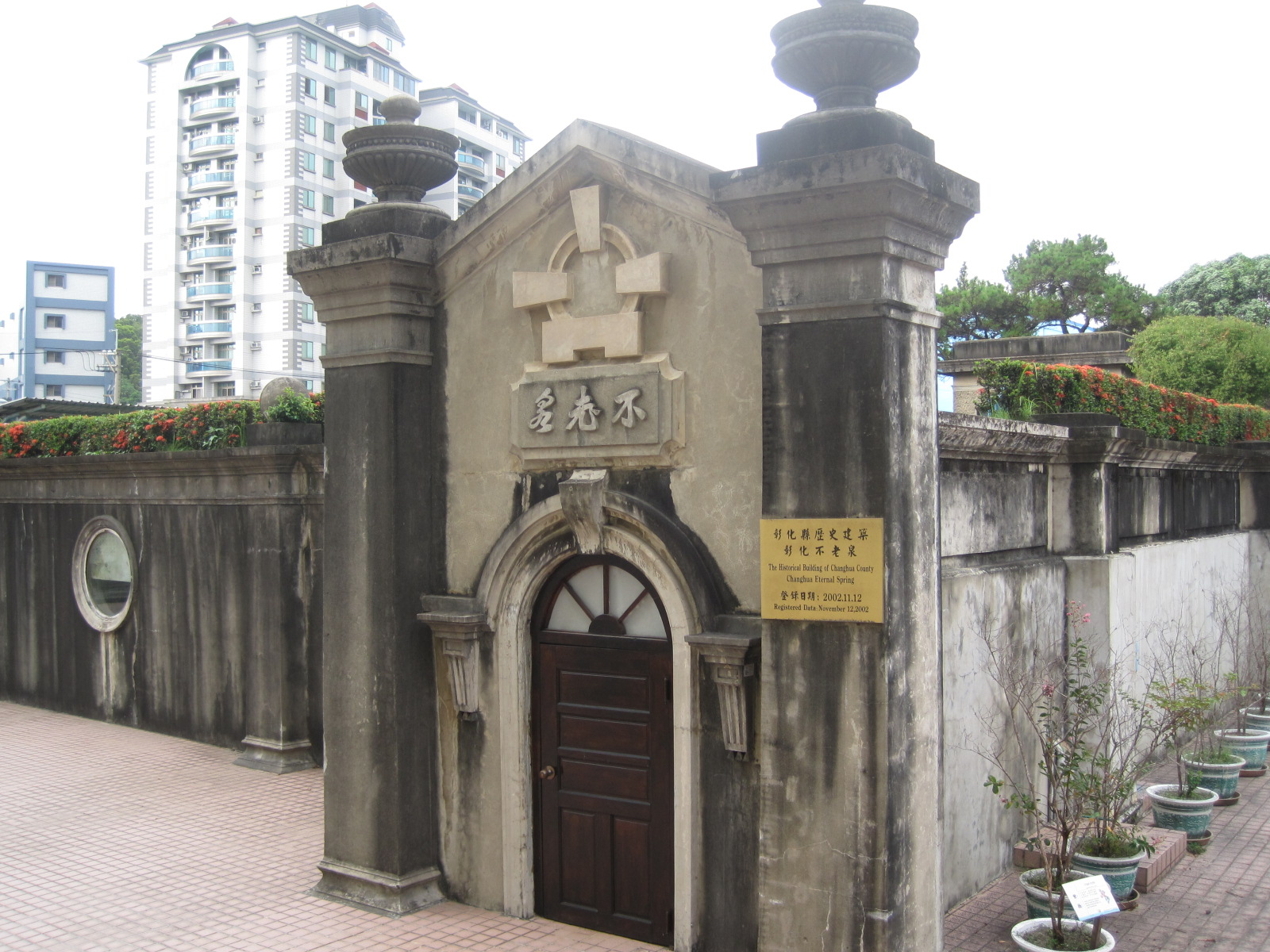
- Interactive map of the Spring of Youth area

General information
- Type: water source
- Location: Changhua City, Changhua County, Taiwan
- Coordinates: 24°04′28.1″N 120°33′25.3″E

The Spring of Youth (Chinese: 彰化不老泉; pinyin: Zhānghuà Bùlǎo Quán) is an old water source in Changhua City, Changhua County, Taiwan. It used to be the slow-filtered and fresh water ponds of the old water source for the city.

== History ==
In its early time, the water source of the place was abundant and endless, thus earning itself the name the Spring of Youth.

== Architecture ==
There are two porticoes in front of the ponds built in decorative elements of renaissance style. They are engraved with the words Spring of Youth and Sweet Dew from Genius Loci.

== Transportation ==
The spring is accessible south east from Changhua Station of Taiwan Railway.

== See also ==
- List of tourist attractions in Taiwan
