= Changhua Arts Hall =

Art gallery in Changhua City, Taiwan

- 彰化藝術館
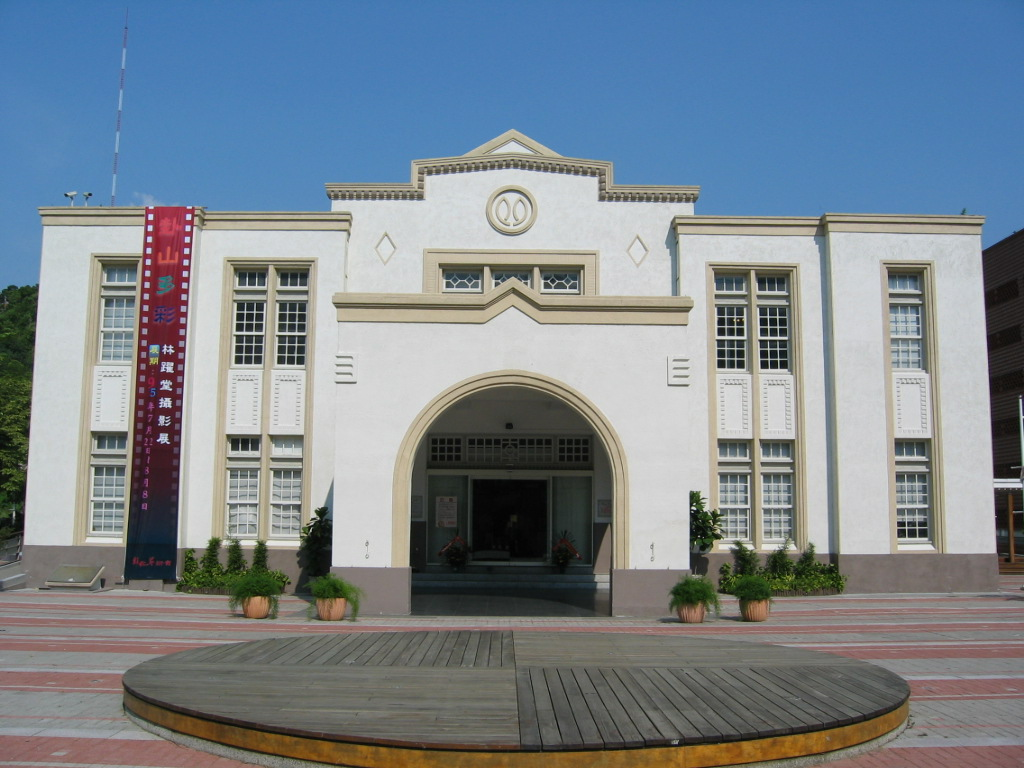
- Interactive map of the Changhua Arts Hall area
- Former names: Jungshan Hall

General information
- Type: art gallery
- Location: Changhua City, Changhua County, Taiwan
- Coordinates: 24°04′44″N 120°32′43″E

Website
- Official website (in Chinese)

The Changhua Arts Hall (traditional Chinese: 彰化藝術館; simplified Chinese: 彰化艺术馆; pinyin: Zhānghuà Yìshùguǎn) is an art gallery in Changhua City, Changhua County, Taiwan.

== Architecture ==
The art gallery is housed in the Jungshan Hall, a quaint building dating back several decades. It consists of performance theater, lecture hall and art gallery. The museum's premises also have a 300-year-old well, known as the Ang-mo Well (紅毛井). It is the last remaining well of the several built by the Dutch. This link with the Dutch gives it the name Ang-mo, which means 'red hair' in Taiwanese.

== Transportation ==
The art gallery is accessible within walking distance east from Changhua Station of the Taiwan Railway.

== See also ==
- List of museums in Taiwan
