= National Changhua Living Art Center =

Arts center in Changhua City, Changhua County, Taiwan

- 國立彰化生活美學館
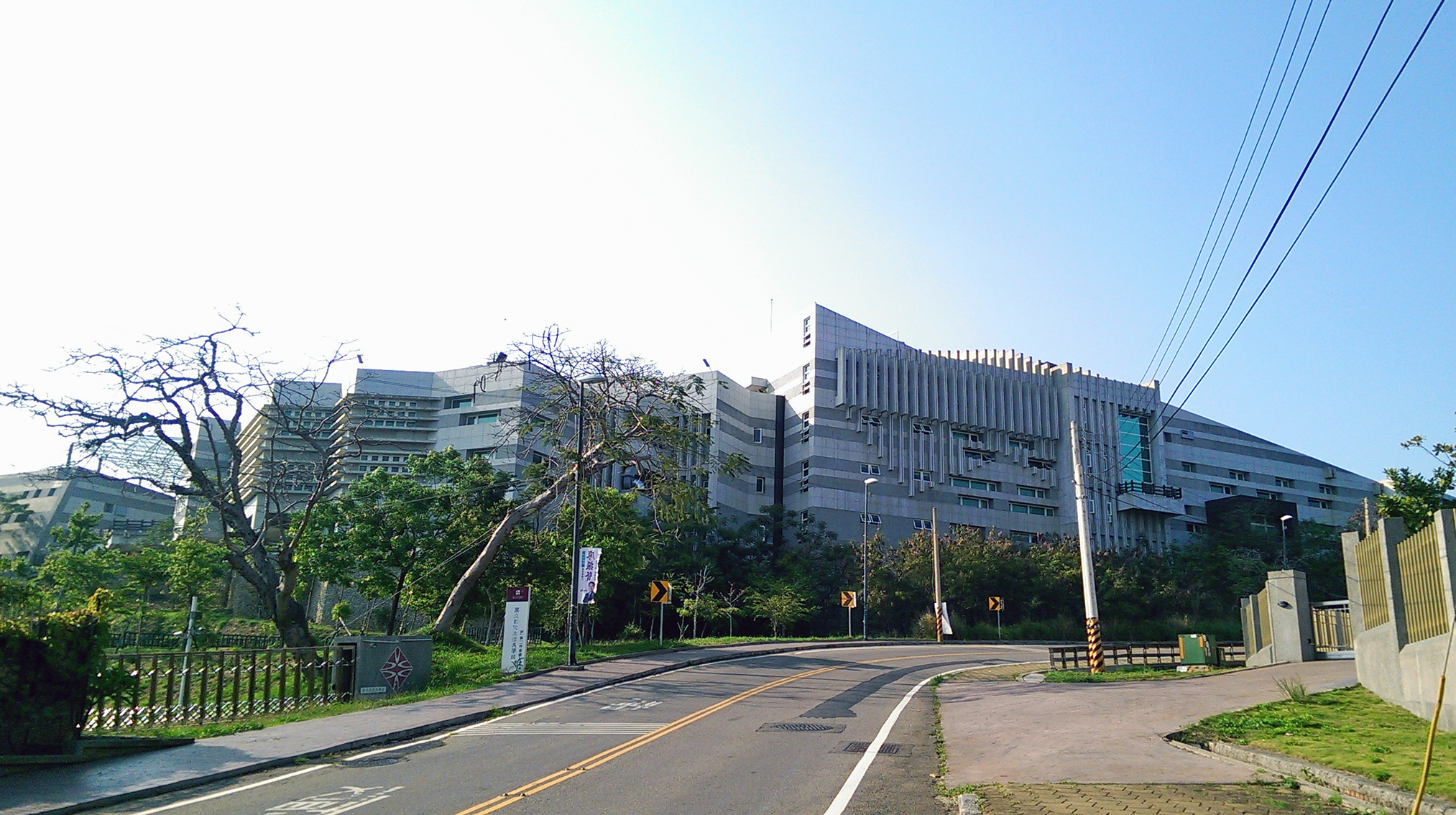
- Interactive map of the National Changhua Living Art Center area

General information
- Type: arts centre
- Location: No. 18 Guashan Road, Changhua City, Changhua County, Taiwan
- Coordinates: 24°04′35.1″N 120°33′26.9″E
- Opened: 2008

Website
- Official website (in Chinese)

The National Changhua Living Art Center (traditional Chinese: 國立彰化生活美學館; simplified Chinese: 国立彰化生活美学馆; pinyin: Guólì Zhānghuà Shēnghuó Měixuéguǎn) is an arts center in Changhua City, Changhua County, Taiwan.

== History ==
The center was established in 2008.

== See also ==
- List of tourist attractions in Taiwan
