= Changhua Confucian Temple =

Temple in Changhua City, Taiwan

- 彰化孔子廟
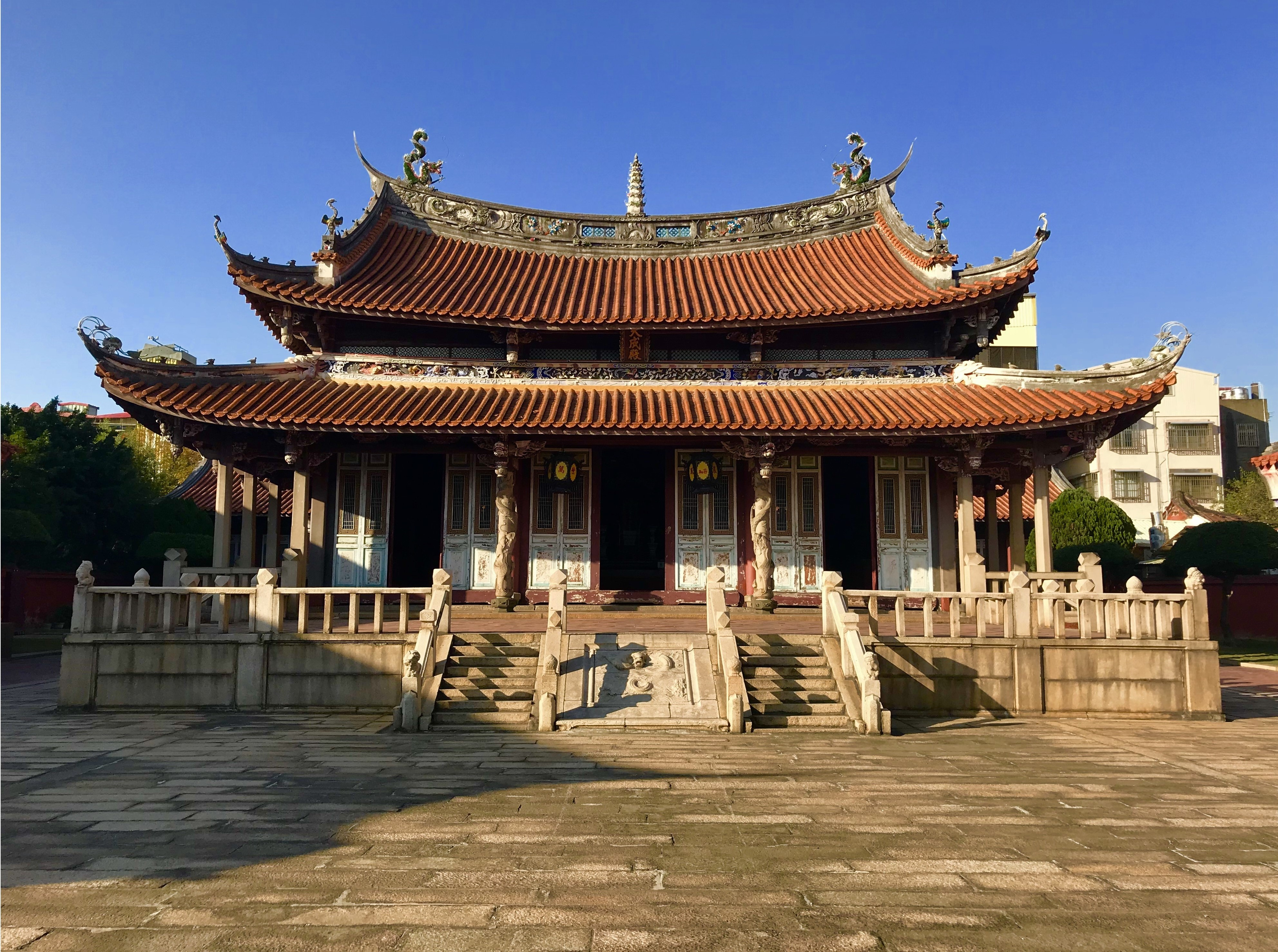

- Taiwan

Location
- Location: Changhua City, Changhua County, Taiwan
- Interactive map of Changhua Confucian Temple
- Coordinates: 24°04′44.5″N 120°32′35.9″E

Architecture
- Type: Temple
- Completed: 1726

The Temple of Confucius (Chinese: 彰化孔子廟; pinyin: Zhānghuà Kǒngzǐ Miào; Pe̍h-ōe-jī: Chiong-hòa-Khóng-chú-biō), is a Confucian temple in Changhua City, Changhua County, Taiwan.

== History ==
The temple was originally built in 1726. The complex previously included the county high school as well as the temple, but of the original buildings only the temple's central buildings remain. It was renovated in 1830. It is a Grade 1 national historical site.

== Architecture ==
The two central columns of the temple were carved from white stones of Quanzhou, Fujian. The main element of the temple is a memorial tablet devoted to Confucius with wooden commemorative inscription written by President Chiang Ching-kuo of Republic of China and Qianlong Emperor of Qing Dynasty.

== See also ==
- Kaihua Temple
- Nanyao Temple
- Shengwang Temple
- Yuanching Temple
- List of tourist attractions in Taiwan
