= Nanyao Temple =

Temple in Changhua City, Changhua County, Taiwan

- 南瑤宮
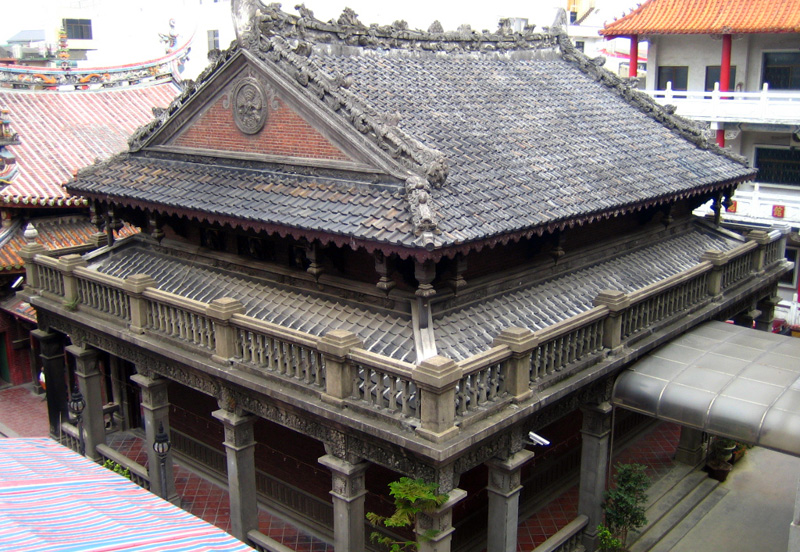

- Location within Changhua County

Location
- Location: Changhua City, Changhua County, Taiwan
- Interactive map of Nanyao Temple
- Coordinates: 24°4′3.7″N 120°32′18.7″E

Architecture
- Type: temple
- Completed: 1738

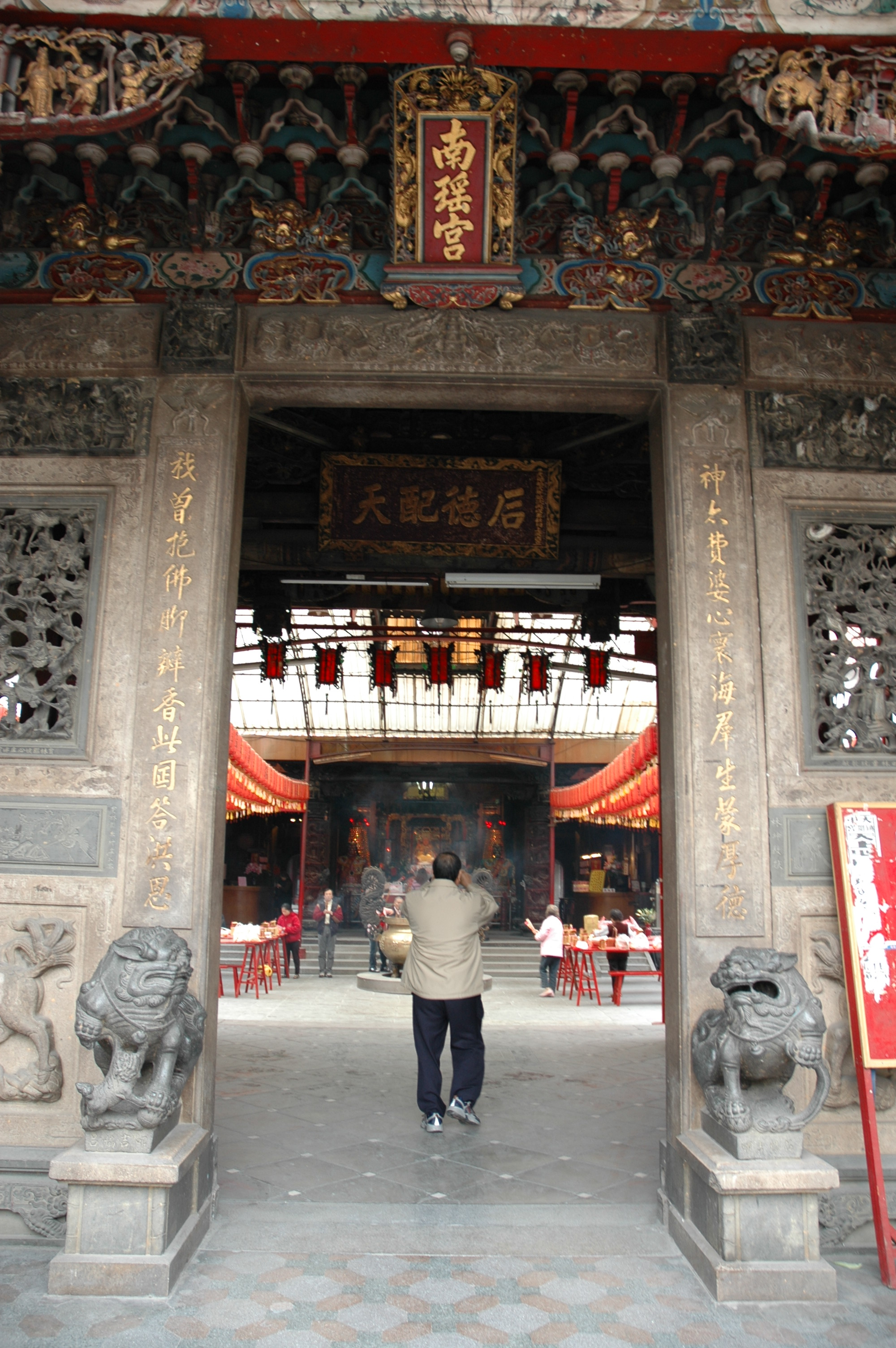
Nanyao Temple

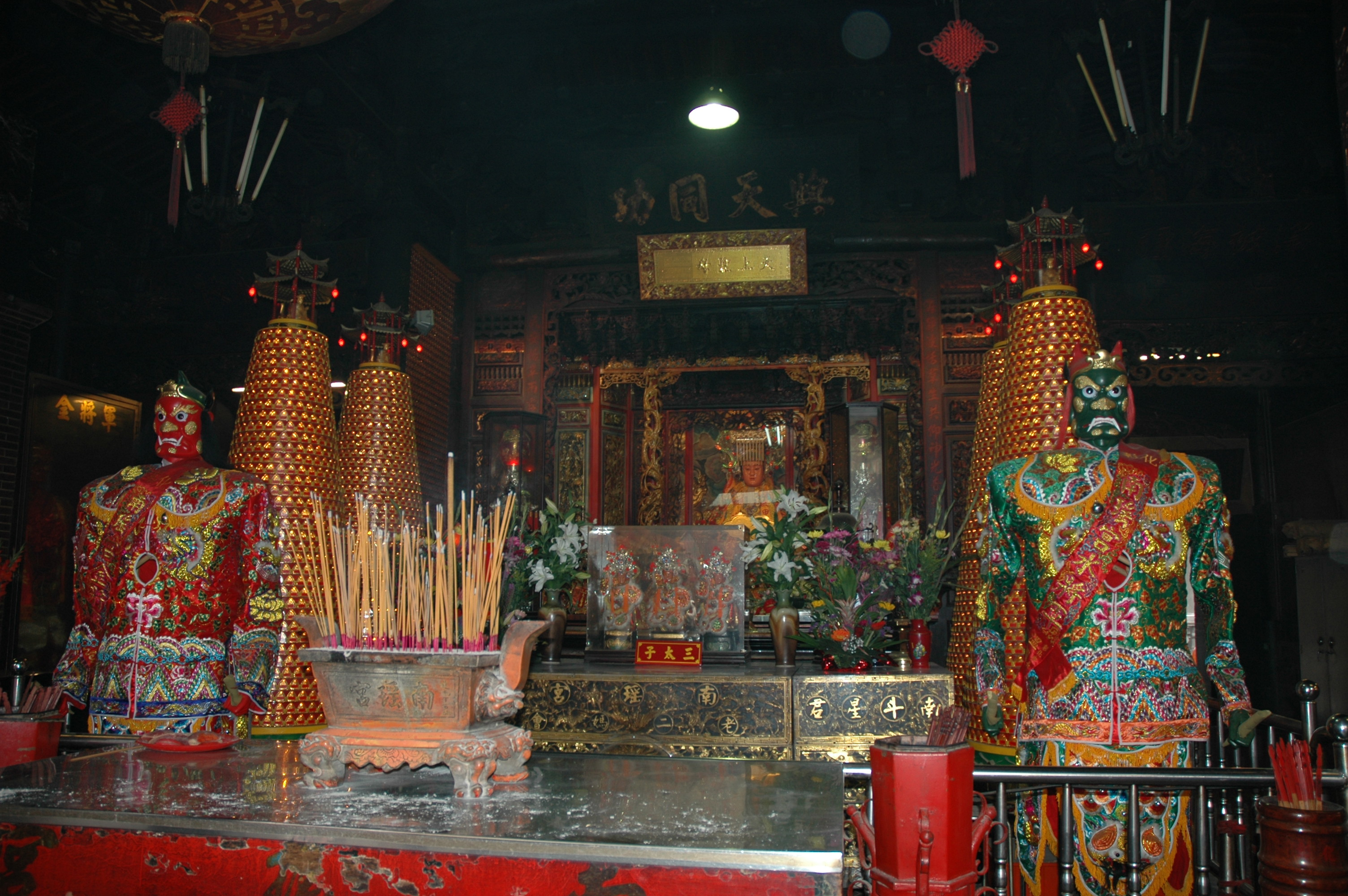
Main shrine of the Nanyao Temple

The Nanyao Temple (traditional Chinese: 南瑤宮; simplified Chinese: 南瑶宫; pinyin: Nányáo Gōng) is a Mazu temple in Nanyao Village, Changhua City, Changhua County, Taiwan. It is designated as a third grade historic building.

== History ==
The construction of the temple was completed in 1738 and originally named Mazu Temple. In November 1738, the construction of the main hall was planned and the temple was renamed Nanyao Temple. In December 1872, a face-cleaning room was added on the left side of the temple thus the cylindrical pillars were constructed. It was originally designed as two-tier structure but the third tier was added during the Japanese rule. On 25 April 1985, the Ministry of the Interior designated the temple as a historical building.

== Architecture ==
The temple consists of ceremonial arch, Sanchuan Gate, main hall, Guanyin Hall, Heavenly Hall and pilgrims' building. The main hall was constructed with traditional architectural style while the Guanyin Hall was constructed with the combination of Fujian, Western and Japanese styles.

== See also ==
- Qianliyan & Shunfeng'er
- List of Mazu temples around the world
- Kaihua Temple
- Shengwang Temple
- Yuanching Temple
- Changhua Confucian Temple
- Bengang Tianhou Temple
- List of temples in Taiwan
- List of tourist attractions in Taiwan
