= Chou Ting-shan =

Chou Ting-shan (Chinese: 周定山; October 25, 1989 – 1975), originally named Chou Huoshu (周火樹), with courtesy name Ke Ya (克亞) and pseudonym Yi Hou (一吼), was affectionately known as "Mr. Respite" (半閑先生) or "an old man of respite" (半閑老叟). He was a significant writer who straddled the boundary between the old and new literature during the Japanese rule period. He hailed from Lukang Township in Changhua County, Taiwan.

Chou Ting-shan was born in Lukang Street, Changhua County, Taichū Prefecture, during the Japanese rule period in Taiwan. His early life was marked by modest means, and he worked as a carpenter and apprentice in a fabric store. However, due to his solid foundation of knowledge in classical Chinese literature and language, he was later employed as a teacher, forsaking his career in commerce. Throughout his life, he held various other positions, such as reporter, editor, head of the Civil Affairs Department in Huwei Township, and cataloger at Taichung Library.

== Activities ==
In 1958, Chou Ting-shan founded the Respite Recitation Society (半閒吟社) in Lukang and served as its president. Most of the society's members were local residents of Lukang, establishing a strong bond with the community. In his later years, he taught Chinese in Lukang. Chou's literary works are mostly poetry, encompassing essays, prose, and novels, as well.

In his spare time, he was active in the poetry scene in Taiwan and maintained connections with renowned northern poets such as Yu Youren (于右任), Chia Ching-teh (賈景德), Chen Han-kuang (陳含光), and so on. Even upon his return to his hometown, he continued to intermittently attend poetry gatherings such as the Fengyuan Fu Chun Poetry Society (富春吟社) and the Taichung Yun Hsiang Poetry Society (芸香吟社). Later, employed by Lukang Township Office, he taught Chinese at Chuan Chiao Hall (泉郊會館) and imparted his knowledge of calligraphy all over Lukang. In his late years, despite frequently suffering from illness as well as the pain of losing his acquaintances and even his own son, he remained dedicated to teaching.

== Works ==
Chou Ting-shan wrote The Poems of Mainland (大陸吟草), The Poems of Hardscrabble (倥傯唫草), Yi Hou's Collection of Poems (一吼居詩存), A Compilation of Yi Hou (一吼劫前集), A Compilation of Yi Hou: Sequel (一吼劫後集), The Memoir of Father (先父行述), etc., and he also edited The Anthology of Taiwan Chanting Bowl (台灣擊鉢吟選集). Chou's new literary pieces can be found in his chapbook titled Yi Hou's Treasury (一吼敝帚集). The National Museum of Taiwan Literature published The Complete Works of Chou Ting-shan (周定山全集) in 2022.
