= Changhua =

City in Taiwan

Changhua 彰化市 Shōka
- County-administered city
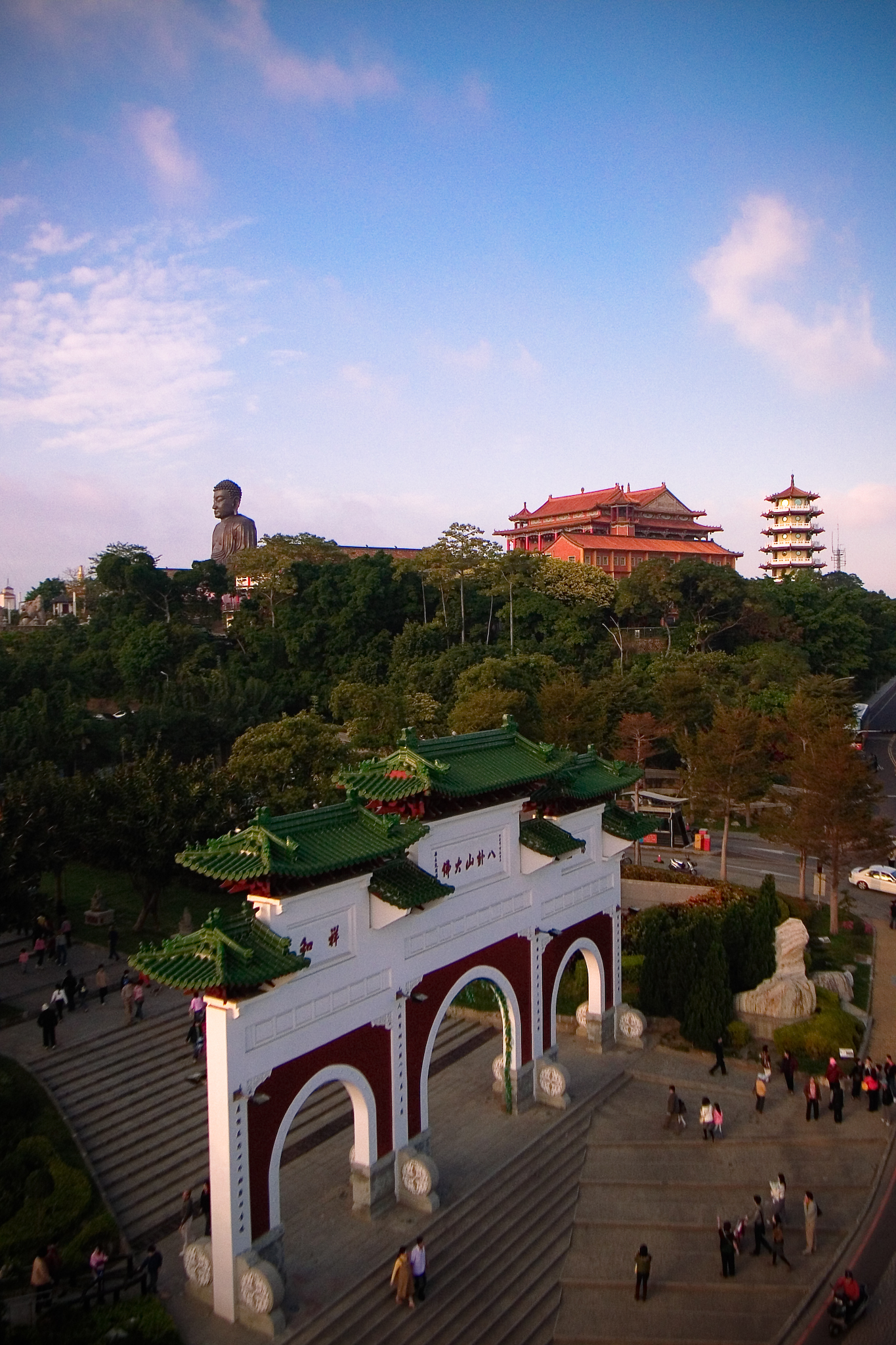
- View of the Great Buddha on Baguashan at Changhua City

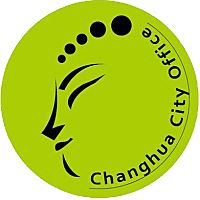
- Seal
- Nickname: Bamboo Town (半線城)
- Coordinates: 24°04′N 120°32′E
- Country: Taiwan
- Province: Taiwan Province
- County: Changhua County

Government
  - Type: County-controlled city
  - Mayor: Lin Shih-shen

Area
  - Total: 65.68 km^{2} (25.36 sq mi)

Population (March 2023)
  - Total: 226,564
  - Density: 3,450/km^{2} (8,934/sq mi)
- ISO 3166 code: TW-CHA
- Website: www.changhua.gov.tw/EN/Home

Changhua City
- Chinese: 彰化市
Transcriptions
Standard Mandarin
- Hanyu Pinyin: Zhānghuà Shì
- Bopomofo: ㄓㄤ ㄏㄨㄚˋ ㄕˋ
- Gwoyeu Romatzyh: Janghuah Shyh
- Wade–Giles: Chang¹-hua⁴ Shih⁴
- Tongyong Pinyin: Jhanghuà Shìh
- Yale Romanization: Jānghwà Shr̀
- MPS2: Jānghuà Shr̀
- IPA: [ʈʂáŋ.xwâ ʂɻ̩̂]
Hakka
- Pha̍k-fa-sṳ: Chông-fa-sṳ
Southern Min
- Hokkien POJ: Chiong-hòa-chhī or Chiang-hòa-chhī
- Tâi-lô: Tsiong-huà-tshī or Tsiang-huà-tshī

Changhua (Hokkien POJ: Chiong-hòa or Chiang-hòa), officially known as Changhua City, is a county-administered city and the county seat of Changhua County in west-central Taiwan. For many centuries the site was home to a settlement of Babuza people, a coastal tribe of Taiwanese aborigines. Changhua city is ranked first by population among county-administered cities. It is part of the Taichung–Changhua metropolitan area, which is the second largest in Taiwan.

Historically, Changhua city was a base for the Han Chinese when they invaded Taiwan against the Taiwanese aborigines, constructing a fortress built out of bamboo. Changhua has a nickname of "Bamboo Town".

Changhua is best known for its landmark Great Buddha Statue of Baguashan. At 26 metres tall, the statue sits atop Bagua Mountain overlooking the city. The main walkway up to the giant is lined with statues of figures from Buddhist lore. Another site of interest is Taiwan's oldest temple honoring Confucius.

== History ==
Poasoa (transliterated into Chinese: 半線; Pe̍h-ōe-jī: Pòaⁿ-sòaⁿ) was once a center of settlement for the Babuza people (a plains aboriginal tribe). During the Dutch period, the area was under the administration of Favorlang (modern-day Huwei, Yunlin) and was controlled by the Dutch East India Company. During the Siege of Fort Zeelandia, the area was also one of Koxinga's central defense and attack bases. During the Chinese immigration of the 17th century, Changhua city was one of the four cities that had major immigration; it was one of the oldest Han Chinese settlements.

By 1694, Poasoa Village (半線庄) had been established. During the late 17th to late 19th century the area continued to be one of the major urban settlements in central Taiwan. In 1723, Changhua County was established, following the Zhu Yigui rebellion. Despite that, rebellions and civil wars continued.

=== Empire of Japan ===
The origin of the modern Changhua City is attributed to the Japanese administration, as they made the city into the official county seat in 1897 under Taichū Ken (Japanese: 臺中縣). During this era, the Japanese pronunciation Shōka came into use, alongside the "Chinese spellings" of "Changwha, Changhwa, Changhoa, Chanhue, Chan-hua, Tchanghoua".

In 1901, the local administrative unit Shōka Chō (彰化廳) was established, but this merged with Taichū Chō (臺中廳) in 1909. In 1920, Shoka was governed under the new Taichū Prefecture. In 1933, Ōtake Village (大竹庄) and Nankaku Village (南郭庄) were merged with Shōka Town and upgraded to Shōka City.

=== Republic of China ===
After the handover of Taiwan from Japan to the Republic of China on 25 October 1945, Changhua City was established as provincial city of Taiwan Province on 25 December the same year. On 30 November 1951, the Changhua City Office was established and subsequently on 1 December 1951, it was downgraded to county-administered city and became the county seat of Changhua County.

== Geography ==
Changhua city has plenty of flat lands, however, the flat lands are divided in two portions by the Central Mountain Range of Taiwan. One on the South Eastern area and the other on the North Western area. The North Eastern area, although being flat, is often affected by soil erosion caused by typhoons during the summer, thus is not suitable for living.

The temperature of Changhua city on average is 22.4 °C (72.3 °F), annually, with July being the hottest and January being the coolest. Annual rainfall is 1,723.4 mm (67.85 in), June being the wettest and November being the driest. Rainfall decreases westward closer to the coastline.

== Climate ==
Climate data for Changhua (Dacun) (1991–2020 normals, extremes 1995–present)
Month	Jan	Feb	Mar	Apr	May	Jun	Jul	Aug	Sep	Oct	Nov	Dec	Year
Record high °C (°F)	30.3 (86.5)	33.6 (92.5)	33.8 (92.8)	34.1 (93.4)	36.0 (96.8)	36.7 (98.1)	39.2 (102.6)	36.9 (98.4)	37.1 (98.8)	36.1 (97.0)	33.6 (92.5)	31.9 (89.4)	39.2 (102.6)
Mean daily maximum °C (°F)	21.6 (70.9)	22.3 (72.1)	24.2 (75.6)	27.3 (81.1)	30.0 (86.0)	32.0 (89.6)	33.2 (91.8)	32.5 (90.5)	31.9 (89.4)	29.9 (85.8)	27.2 (81.0)	23.4 (74.1)	28.0 (82.3)
Daily mean °C (°F)	16.4 (61.5)	17.1 (62.8)	19.5 (67.1)	23.0 (73.4)	25.9 (78.6)	27.8 (82.0)	28.9 (84.0)	28.4 (83.1)	27.5 (81.5)	24.8 (76.6)	21.9 (71.4)	18.2 (64.8)	23.3 (73.9)
Mean daily minimum °C (°F)	12.8 (55.0)	13.5 (56.3)	16.0 (60.8)	19.5 (67.1)	22.6 (72.7)	24.7 (76.5)	25.5 (77.9)	25.4 (77.7)	24.3 (75.7)	21.4 (70.5)	18.3 (64.9)	14.5 (58.1)	19.9 (67.8)
Record low °C (°F)	3.8 (38.8)	5.2 (41.4)	4.0 (39.2)	10.0 (50.0)	15.5 (59.9)	17.8 (64.0)	22.5 (72.5)	22.7 (72.9)	17.2 (63.0)	14.7 (58.5)	8.2 (46.8)	5.1 (41.2)	3.8 (38.8)
Average precipitation mm (inches)	27.8 (1.09)	51.4 (2.02)	62.8 (2.47)	93.8 (3.69)	187.3 (7.37)	260.5 (10.26)	216.9 (8.54)	243.5 (9.59)	104.6 (4.12)	19.9 (0.78)	21.3 (0.84)	27.1 (1.07)	1,316.9 (51.84)
Average precipitation days	4.4	5.4	6.7	7.1	8.6	10.3	8.8	10.2	5.3	2.6	3.0	3.6	76
Average relative humidity (%)	79.0	79.8	80.1	81.5	82.6	82.0	79.8	82.8	80.5	77.8	78.6	77.1	80.1
Mean monthly sunshine hours	171.8	150.2	161.0	161.8	189.5	198.1	228.6	208.7	207.7	215.5	167.1	165.3	2,225.3
Source: Central Weather Administration (precipitation days 1995–2020, sun 1991–2015)

== Government ==
Changhua City office

Changhua contains the Changhua County Government and Changhua County Council.

=== Administrative divisions ===
Changhua City is divided into the following villages (in romanized alphabetical order):

Anxi, Ayi, Baobu, Chenggong, Citong, Datong, Dazhu, Fuan, Fugui, Fushan, Futian, Fuxing, Guangfu, Guanghua, Guangnan, Guashan, Guosheng, Guyi, Hediao, Huabei, Huayang, Jiadong, Jianan, Jianbao, Jieshou, Kuaiguan, Longshan, Lunping, Minquan, Minsheng, Nanan, Nanmei, Nanxing, Nanyao, Niupu, Pinghe, Sancun, Shipai, Taifeng, Taoyuan, Tianzhong, Tungfang, Tungxing, Wanan, Wanshou, Wenhua, Wuquan, Xiabu, Xian Xiangshan, Xiangyang, Xingbei, Xinhua, Xinxing, Xinyi, Xishi, Xixing, Yangming, Yanhe, Yanping, Yongfu, Yongsheng, Zhangan, Zhangle, Zhongquan, Zhongshan, Zhongxiao, Zhongyang, Zhongzheng, Zhongzhuang, Zhuanyao, Zhuxiang and Zhuzhong.

== Economy ==
Changhua City is one of the more developed areas of Changhua County, industrialization has been ongoing since the 1970s. This is reflected by an increase of factories in Changhua and decreasing amount of agricultural fields. From a poll in 1992, 43.2% of respondents worked in the service sector, 42.4% in the industrial sector and only 14.4% in either the agricultural or fishing sector.

== Education ==
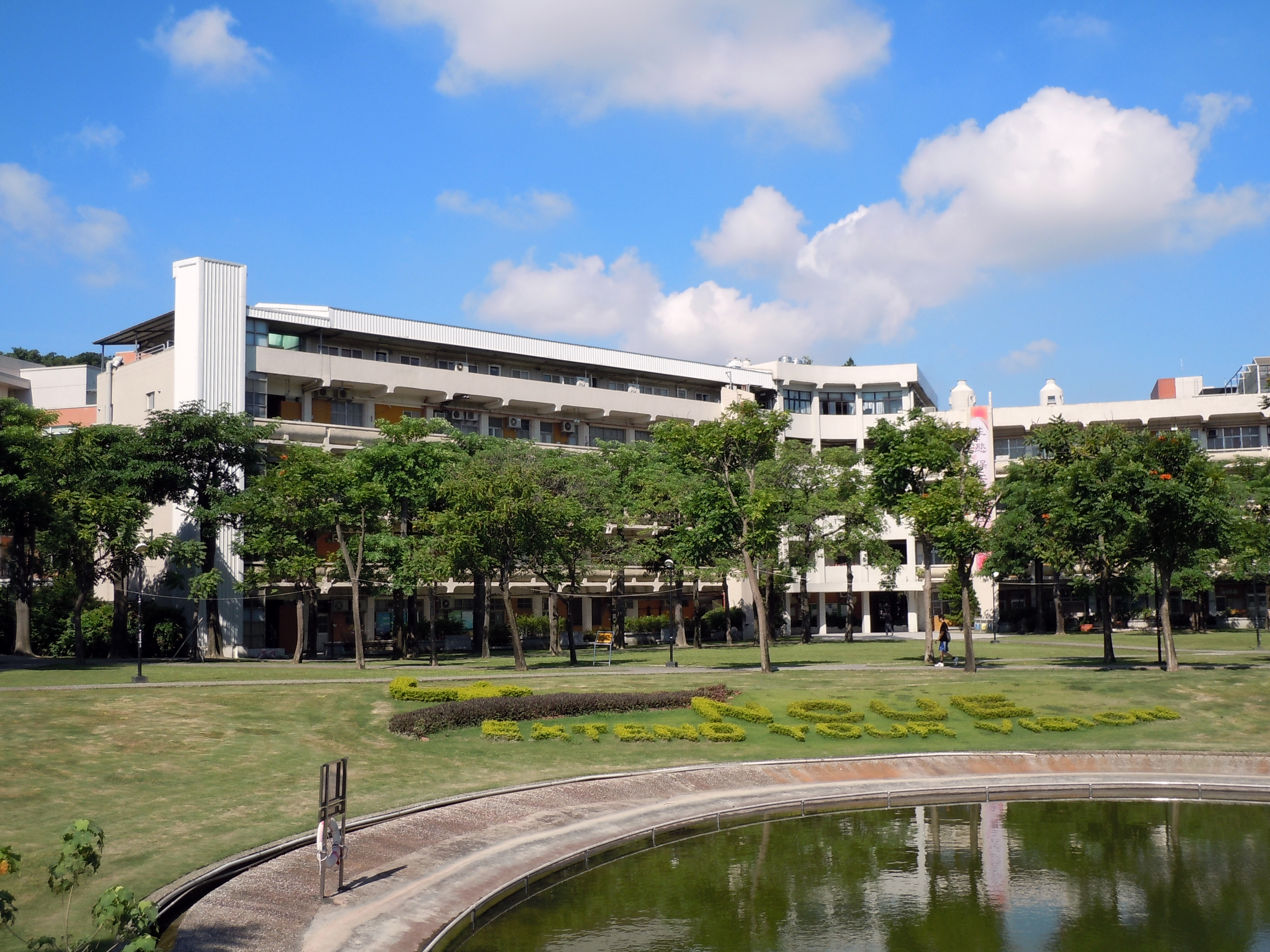
National Changhua University of Education

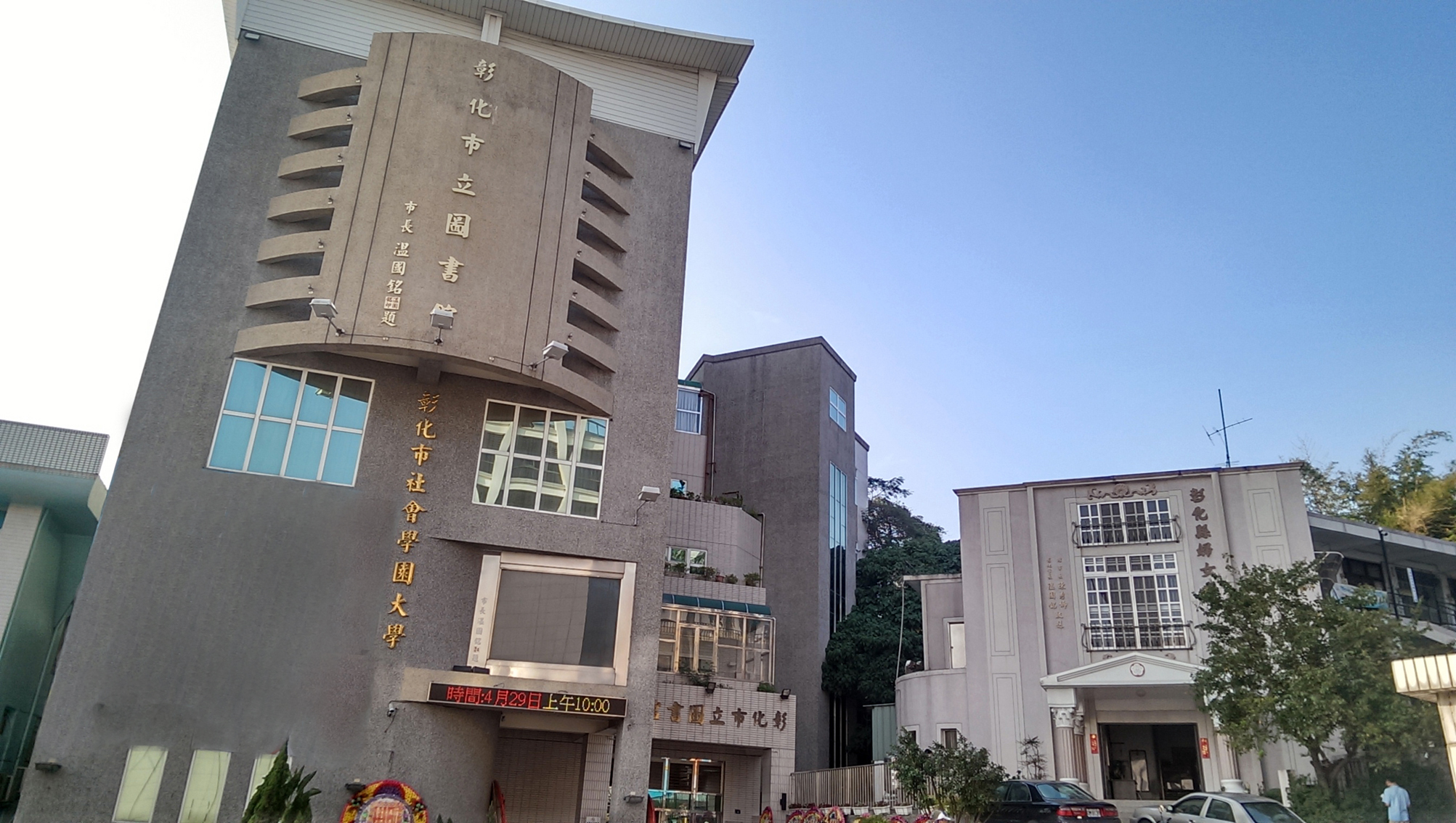
Changhua City library

The earliest school in Changhua dated back to 1726 during the Qing dynasty. The Japanese administration also improved the education system in Changhua City. Changhua City has 15 elementary schools, 7 junior high schools, 7 senior high schools and 2 technical schools/universities.

=== Universities ===
- National Changhua University of Education
- Chienkuo Technology University

=== High schools ===
- National Changhua Senior High School
- Changhua Girls' Senior High School
- Changhua Arts High School (CHASH)
- National Changhua Senior School of Commerce (CHSC)
- The Affiliated Industrial Vocational High School of National Changhua University of Education (SIVS)
- Zen Del Senior High School (ZDVS)
- Ching Cheng High School (CCH)

=== Libraries ===
- Changhua City Library

== Tourist attractions ==
The Great Buddha statue in Changhua

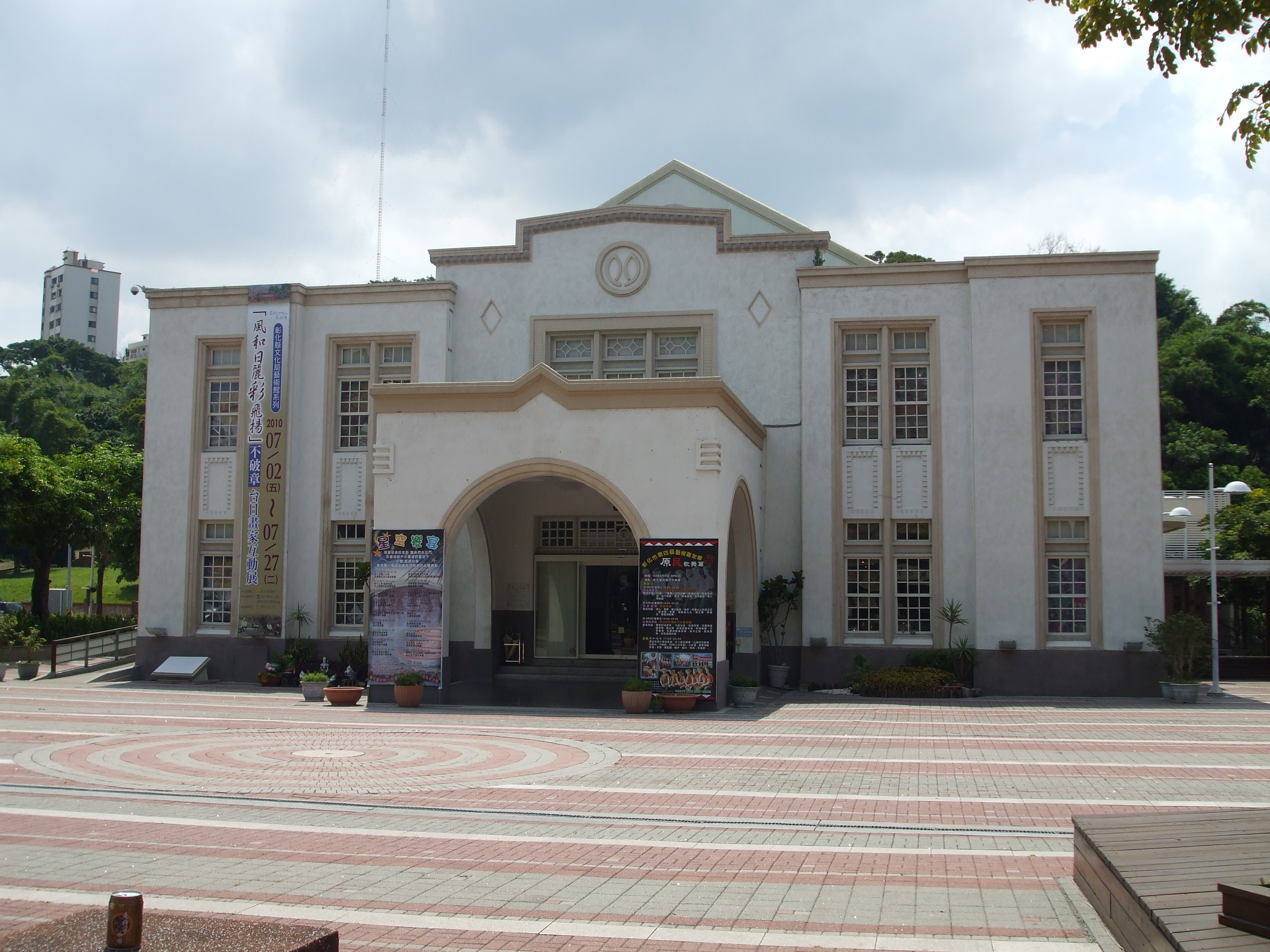
Changhua Arts Hall

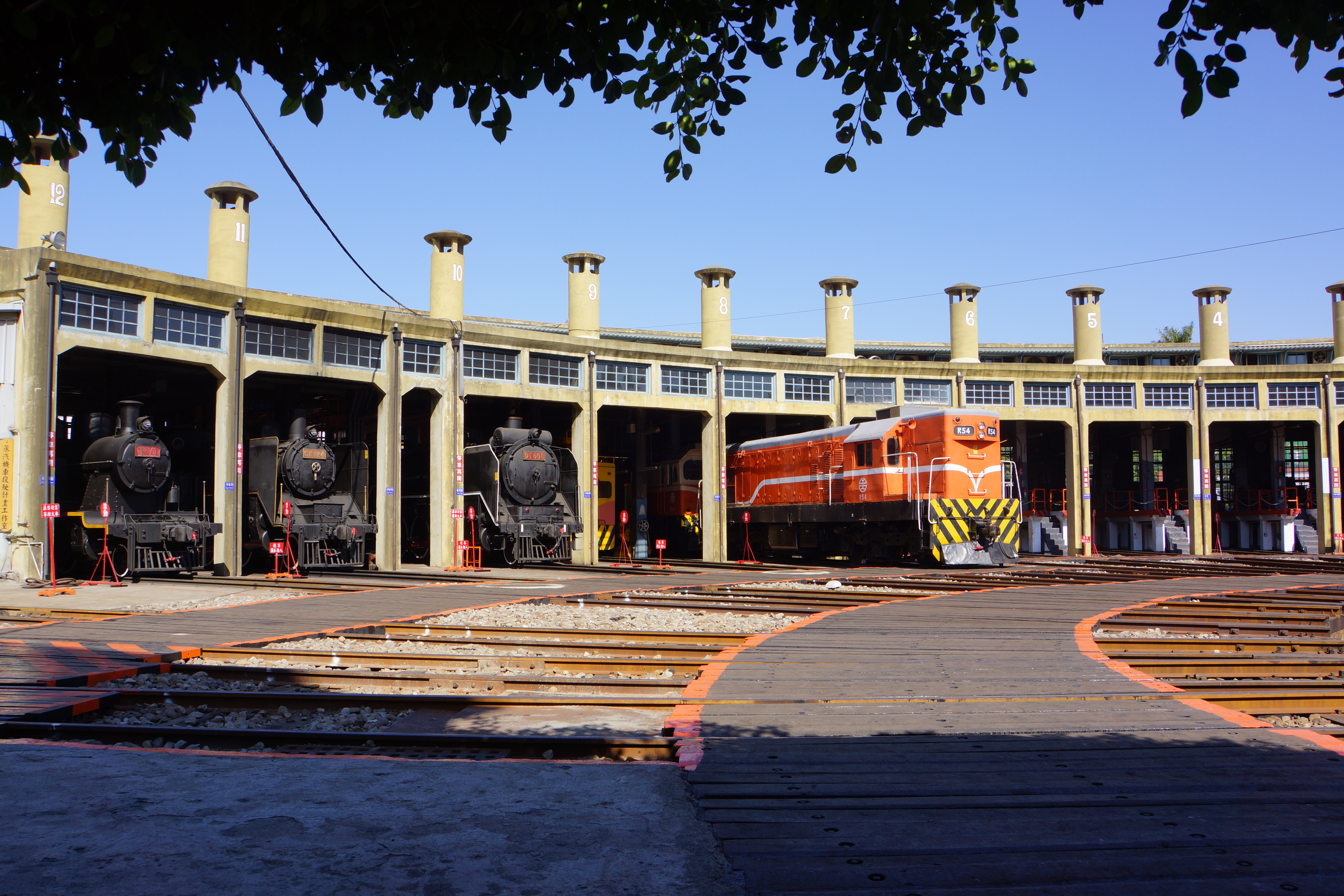
Changhua Roundhouse

- 1895 Baguashan Anti-Japanese Martyrs' Museum
- Anti-Japanese Martyrs' Monument Park
- Baguashan Great Buddha
- Baguashan Literature Walk (八卦山文學步道)
- Baguashan Silver Bridge (八卦山銀橋)
- Changhua Arts Hall
- Changhua Confucian Temple
- Changhua County Art Museum
- Changhua Railway Hospital
- Changhua Wude Hall
- Changhua Roundhouse
- Gu-Yue Folk Museum (古月民俗館)
- Huayang Park (華陽公園)
- Hsinding Old Street (新町老街)
- Kaihua Temple
- Lai Ho Memorial Hall
- Museum of Traditional Nan Bei Music and Theater
- Nanyao Temple
- National Changhua Living Art Center
- Red Hair Well (紅毛井)
- Spring of Youth
- Shengwang Temple
- Yuanching Temple
- Yuan Ching Kaun Tradition Art Museum (元清觀民藝館)

== Transportation ==
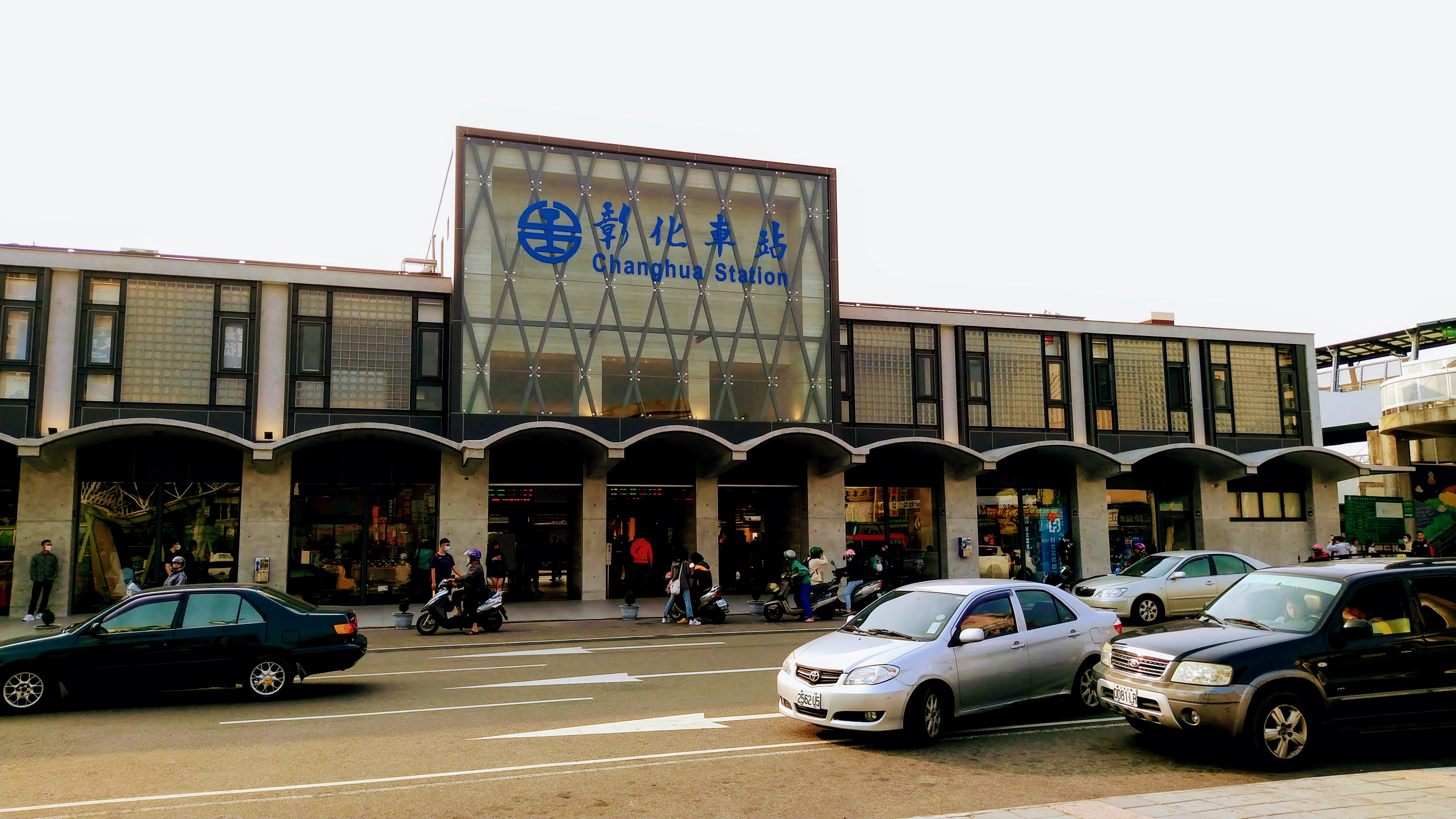
Changhua railway station

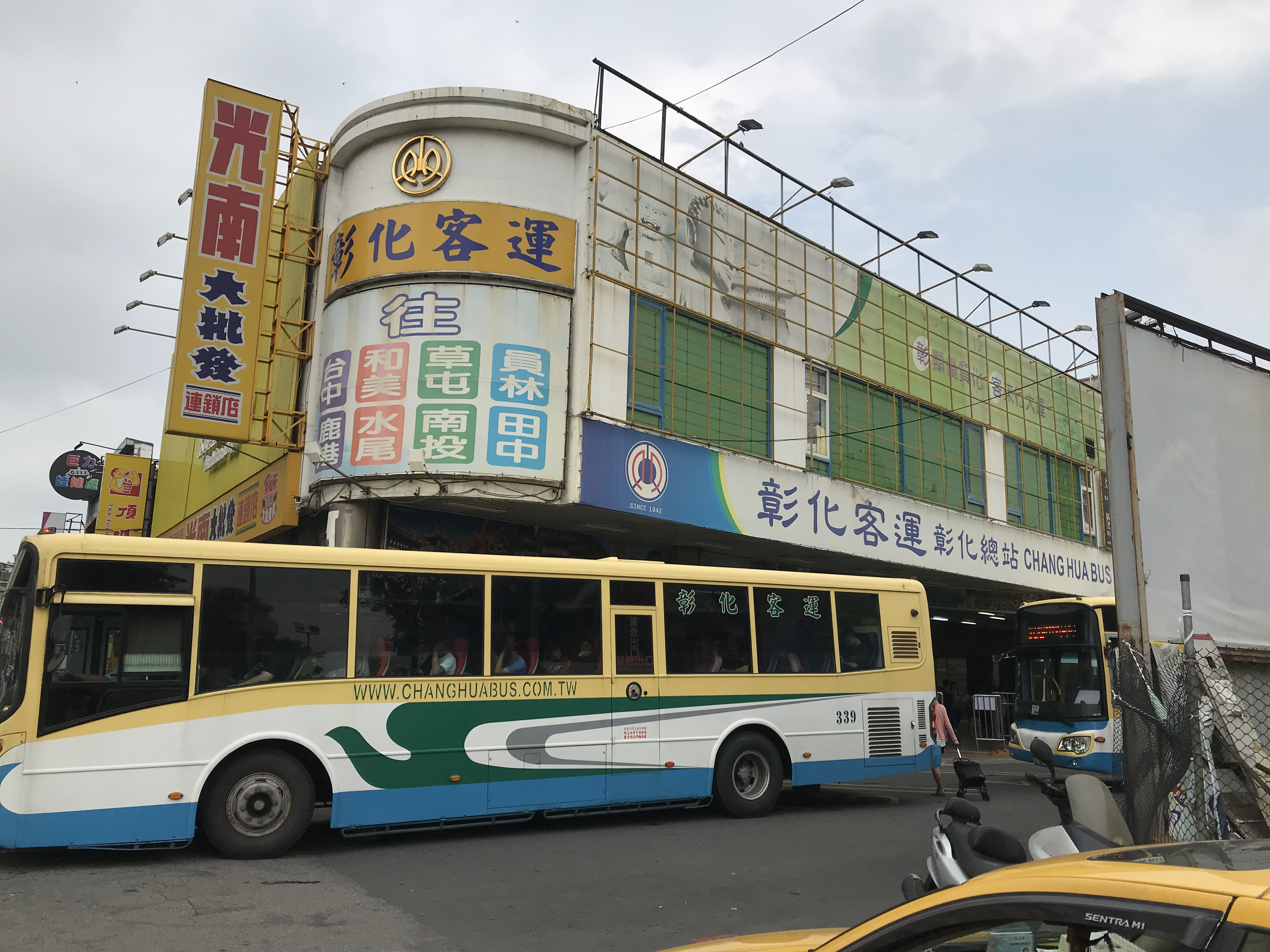
Changhua Bus Station

Changhua railway station is the only Taiwan Railway station in Changhua City.

Freeway 1 connects Changhua City to Taichung City and is one of the primary route for commuters between the two cities. Freeway 3 intersects with Freeway 1 at Changhua and connects to Provincial Highway 74.

== Other events ==
On 25 May 2002, China Airlines Flight 611 broke into pieces in mid-air. Parts of the plane landed in Changhua.

== Notable people ==
- Johanna Schipper (known as "Johanna"; born 1967), comics artist and short story writer
