= Kaihua Temple =

Chinese temple in Changhua City, Changhua County, Taiwan

- 開化寺
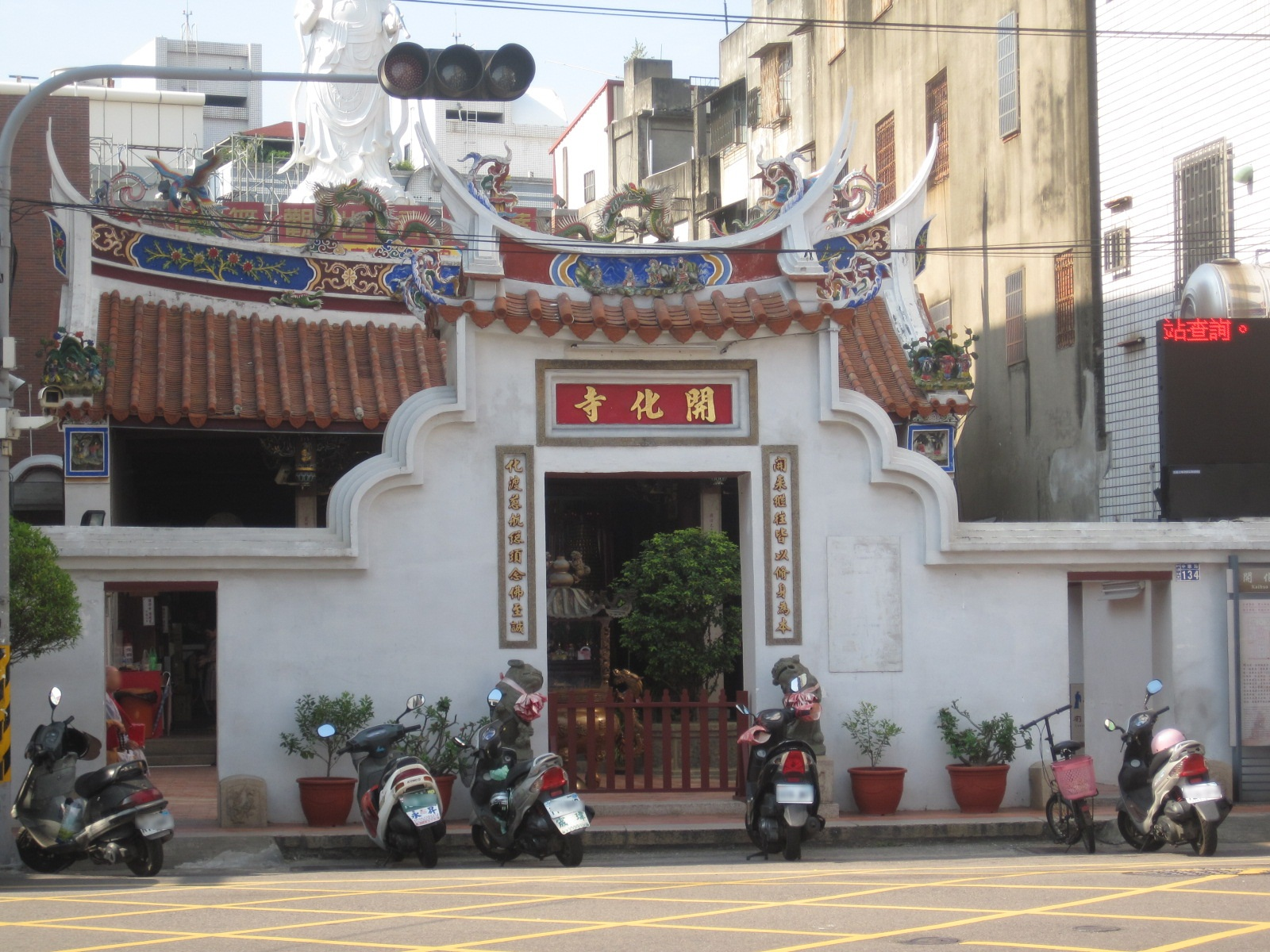

- Location within Changhua County

Religion
- Affiliation: Buddhism

Location
- Location: Changhua City, Changhua County, Taiwan
- Coordinates: 24°4′43.8″N 120°32′27.3″E

Architecture
- Type: temple
- Completed: 1724

The Kaihua Temple (traditional Chinese: 開化寺; simplified Chinese: 开化寺; pinyin: Kāihuà Sì) is a temple in Guanghua Village, Changhua City, Changhua County, Taiwan.

== History ==
The temple was originally constructed in 1724 as Guanyin Shrine. It was then the political and education center of the region. In 1753, local residents raised funds to renovate the temple. Later on, the temple became the command center for anti-Qing Dynasty forces and the building became half destroyed. In 1840, the temple was rebuilt. However, fire destroyed the temple in 1860. The temple was then rebuilt again during Tongzhi Emperor. During the Japanese rule, the Sanchuan Gate of the temple was removed to make way for road expansion work. A new temple gate was rebuilt at the north side of Meng Road with the Kaihua Temple name inscribed onto it.

== Architecture and customs ==
The temple consists of a main gate, main hall and one rear hall. Two stone lions stand in front. The main deity is Avalokitesvara bodhisattva, though at some point during the Qing Dynasty, it began to venerate Lord and Lady Pox, a physician couple who purportedly miraculously cured people with smallpox before disappearing. Visitors bring various lotions and makeup powders to their altar, while those who have been cured from acne bring bouquets of flowers.

== Transportation ==
The temple is accessible within walking distance southeast of Changhua Station of Taiwan Railway.

== See also ==
- Baozang Temple
- Hushan Temple
- Lukang Longshan Temple
- Nanyao Temple
- Jinquan Temple
- Shengwang Temple
- Yuanching Temple
- Changhua Confucian Temple
- List of tourist attractions in Taiwan
