= Chienkuo Technology University =

University in Changhua City, Taiwan

- 建國科技大學
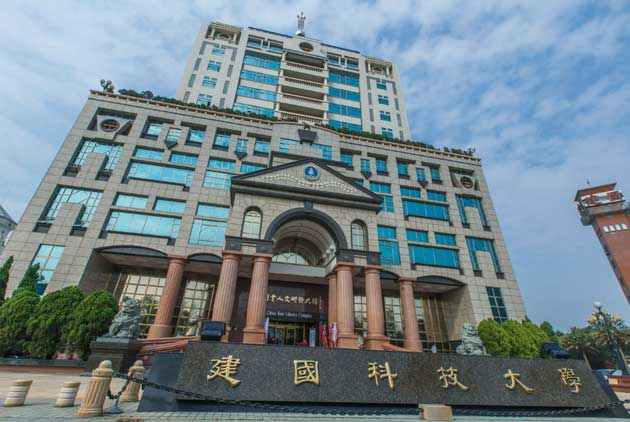
- Type: private university
- Established: October 1965 (as Chienkuo Commercial Junior College); August 2004 (as CTU)
- Location: Changhua City, Changhua County, Taiwan; 24.0665°N 120.5500°E
- Website: Official website

Chienkuo Technology University
- Traditional Chinese: 建國科技大學
- Simplified Chinese: 建国科技大学
Transcriptions
Standard Mandarin
- Hanyu Pinyin: Jiànguó Kējì Dàxué
Southern Min
- Hokkien POJ: Kiàn-kok Kho-ki Tāi-ha̍k

Chienkuo Technology University (CTU; Chinese: 建國科技大學; Pe̍h-ōe-jī: Kiàn-kok Kho-ki Tāi-ha̍k) is a private university located in Changhua City, Changhua County, Taiwan.

The university offers undergraduate and graduate programs in a variety of fields, including engineering, management, design, humanities, and social sciences.

The university has a number of international partnerships and encourages its students to study abroad through exchange programs.

== History ==
CTU was initially established in October 1965 as Chienkuo Commercial Junior College. It changed its name in August 1974 to Chienkuo Industrial Junior College and again in November 1992 as Chienkuo Industrial-and-Commercial Junior College. It underwent restructuring in August 1999 to become Chienkuo Institute of Technology. It finally changed its name to Chienkuo Technology University in August 2004. In 2020, the university had an enrollment rate of less than 60%.

== Faculties ==
Faculties of the university are college of engineering, college of management, college of design and college of living technology.

== Transportation ==
The university is accessible South East from Changhua Station of Taiwan Railway.

== See also ==
- List of universities in Taiwan
