= Changhua County Government =

Government of Changhua County, Taiwan

Coordinates: 24.0756°N 120.5443°E

- 彰化縣政府
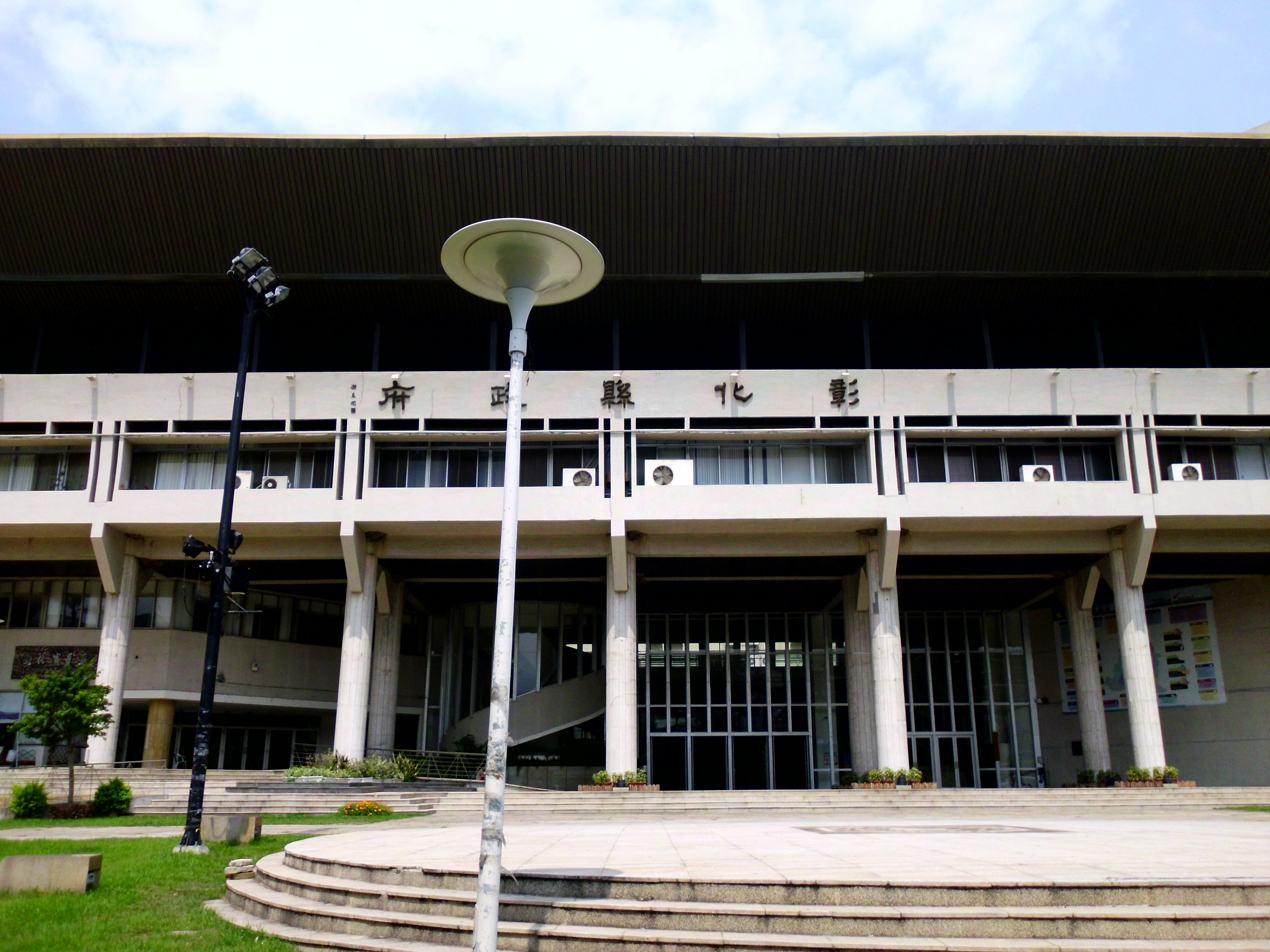
- Changhua County Hall

Agency overview
- Jurisdiction: Changhua County
- Headquarters: Changhua City
- Agency executive: Wang Huei-mei, Magistrate
- Website: Official website

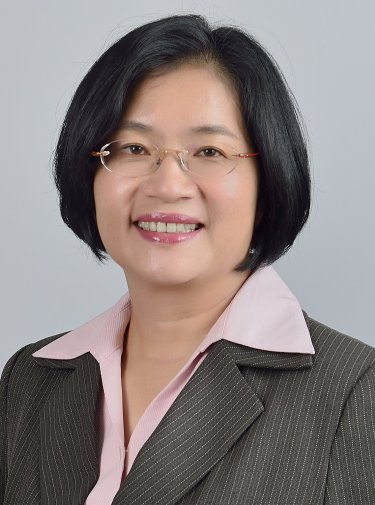
Wang Huei-mei, the incumbent Magistrate of Changhua County

The Changhua County Government (CHCG; traditional Chinese: 彰化縣政府; simplified Chinese: 彰化县政府; pinyin: Zhānghuà Xiàn Zhèngfǔ) is the local government of Changhua County, Taiwan.

== Organization ==
- Magistrate
- Deputy Magistrate
- Secretary-general

=== First Class Department ===
- Department of Civil Affairs
- Department of Finance
- Department of Economic Affairs
- Department of Education
- Department of Public Works
- Department of Water Resources
- Department of City and Tourism Development
- Department of Agriculture
- Department of Social Affairs
- Department of Labor Affairs
- Department of Land Administration
- Department of Information
- Department of General Affairs
- Department of Planning
- Department of Legal Affairs
- Consumer Ombudsman officer
- Department of Personnel
- Department of Accounting and Statistics
- Department of Civil Service Ethics

=== First-Class Organ ===
- Police Bureau
- Public Health Bureau
- Fire Bureau
- Environmental Protection Bureau
- Local Tax Bureau
- Cultural Affairs Bureau

=== Second-class Organ ===
- Household Registration Office
- Land Office
- Public Health Center
- Chronic Disease Center
- Animal Disease Center
- Family Education Center

=== School ===
- Six-year High School
- Junior High School
- Elementary School

== Access ==
The county hall is accessible within walking distance south east from Changhua Station of Taiwan Railway.

== See also ==
- Changhua County Council
