= Changhua County =

Changhua County 彰化縣 Chiang-hoa
- County
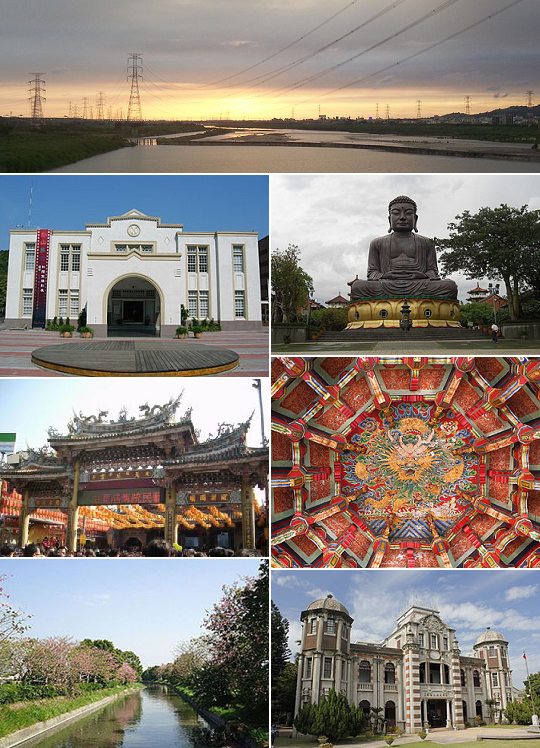
- Top:View of Wu River from National Highway 74, between Changsha and Wuri, 2nd left:Changhua County Hall, 2nd right:Baguashan Great Buddha in Changhua City, 3rd left:Lukang Tinhau Temple, 3rd right:View of inside in roof at Longshan Temple, Lukang, Bottom left:View of entrance in Baguashan Buddha Park, Bottom right:Koo's House in Lukang Folk Museum

- Flag Logo

- Coordinates: 23°56′N 120°32′E
- Country: Taiwan
- Province: Taiwan (Note: In Taiwan, provinces remain a nominal division according to the Taiwanese constitution, but are no longer considered to have any administrative function practically.)
- Region: Western Taiwan
- Seat: Changhua City
- Largest city: Changhua City
- Boroughs: 2 cities, 24 (6 urban, 18 rural) townships

Government
  - Magistrate: Wang Huei-mei (KMT)

Area
  - Total: 1,074.396 km^{2} (414.827 sq mi)
  - Rank: 15 of 22

Population (February 2026)
  - Total: 1,208,018
  - Rank: 7 of 22
  - Density: 1,124.369/km^{2} (2,912.103/sq mi)
- Time zone: UTC+8 (NST)
- Website: www.chcg.gov.tw/eng/index.aspx
- Symbols
- Anthem: Changhua County Song
- Bird: Grey-faced buzzard (Butastur indicus)
- Flower: Chrysanthemum
- Tree: Peepul (Ficus religiosa)

Changhua County
- Traditional Chinese: 彰化縣
- Simplified Chinese: 彰化县
- Wade–Giles: Chang¹-hua⁴ Hsien⁴
- Hanyu Pinyin: Zhānghuà Xiàn
Transcriptions
Standard Mandarin
- Hanyu Pinyin: Zhānghuà Xiàn
- Bopomofo: ㄓㄤ ㄏㄨㄚˋ ㄒㄧㄢˋ
- Gwoyeu Romatzyh: Janghuah Shiann
- Wade–Giles: Chang¹-hua⁴ Hsien⁴
- Tongyong Pinyin: Jhanghuà Siàn
- Yale Romanization: Jānghwà Syàn
- MPS2: Jānghuà Shiàn
- IPA: [ʈʂáŋ.xwâ ɕjɛ̂n]
Hakka
- Pha̍k-fa-sṳ: Chông-fa-yen
Southern Min
- Hokkien POJ: Chiang-hòa-koān or Chiong-hòa-koān
- Tâi-lô: Tsiang-huà-kuān or Tsiong-huà-kuān

Changhua (Note: In local languages: Traditional Chinese script: 彰化縣; Mandarin Pinyin: Zhānghuà Xiàn; Hokkien: Chiang-hòa-koān or Chiong-hòa-koān) is a county located in west-central Taiwan, which is the smallest on the main island of Taiwan by area, and the fourth smallest in the country. With a total population of 1.2 million, Changhua County is the most populous county in the Republic of China. Its capital is Changhua City and it is part of the Taichung–Changhua metropolitan area.

== History ==
=== Early history ===
There are 32 prehistoric burial sites in Changhua that date back 5000 years. The original name of the area was Poasoa (Chinese: 半線; Pe̍h-ōe-jī: Pòaⁿ-sòaⁿ; lit. 'half line'), so-named by the local indigenous tribes. Poasoa used to be inhabited primarily by the Babuza people, who have since been mostly assimilated by the Han people.

=== Qing dynasty ===
Qing rule in Taiwan began in 1683, and in 1684, Taiwan Prefecture was established to administer Taiwan under Fujian Province. The prefecture consisted of three counties: Taiwan County, Fongshan District (Formosa) and Zhuluo. Poasoa and modern-day Changhua County were under the jurisdiction of Zhuluo, but the Changhua area was spread over three counties.

In 1723, after the Zhu Yigui rebellion, an inspector official in Taiwan requested to the Qing Emperor to designate Changhua to another county magistrate and legal warden because of the increasing population in the northern part of Zhuluo County. As a result, Changhua County was created, encompassing the area of modern Changhua County, Taichung, half of Yunlin County and three townships of Nantou County. Changhua County Hall was built in the middle of the district and is regarded as the beginning of the Changhua County establishment.

The name of Changhua, meaning "manifestation of a royal civilization", is formally worded "manifestation of the majestic Emperor's civilization spread over the seas".

=== Japanese rule ===
During early Japanese rule, the island was subdivided into three ken (県): Taihoku, Taiwan, and Tainan. Changhua was ruled under Taiwan Ken. In 1920, after several administrative changes, Taichū Prefecture was established, covering modern-day Changhua County, Nantou County and Taichung City. By 1930, the population in Changhua already exceeded one million.

=== After World War II ===
After the after World War II of Taiwan on 25 December 1945, the area of the current Changhua County was established under the jurisdiction of Taichung County. On 16 August 1950 after its separation from Taichung County, Changhua County was established with Changhua City as its county seat on 1 December 1951.

== Geography ==
Changhua county is located on the west coast of Taiwan, bordering Taichung City on the north separated by Dadu River, so Changhua County and Taichung City are often referred to as the Taichung–Changhua metropolitan area. Changhua County is bordered by Yunlin County to the south by the Zhuoshui River. To the east, Changhua County is separated from Nantou County and southern Taichung City by Bagua Plateau. To the west, Changhua County faces the Taiwan Strait.

The county's total area is 1,074 km^{2} (415 sq mi), being Taiwan's smallest county. It owns a 60 km (37 mi) of coastline. The landscape of Changhua can be roughly divided into two parts, one being the western flat land, and the other being the Changhua Plain. This two combines measures up to 88% of Changhua county's total area. The highest elevation in Changhua is "Hen Shan", at 443 m (1,453 ft).

== Administration ==
Map of Changhua County

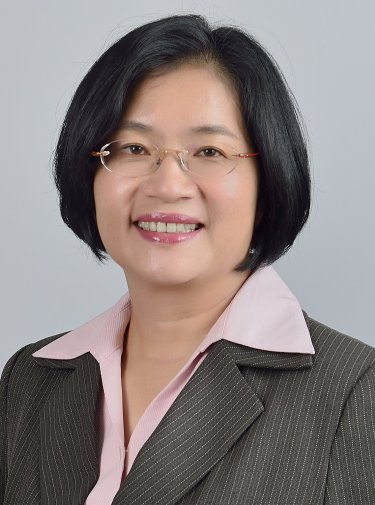
Wang Huei-mei, the incumbent Magistrate of Changhua County

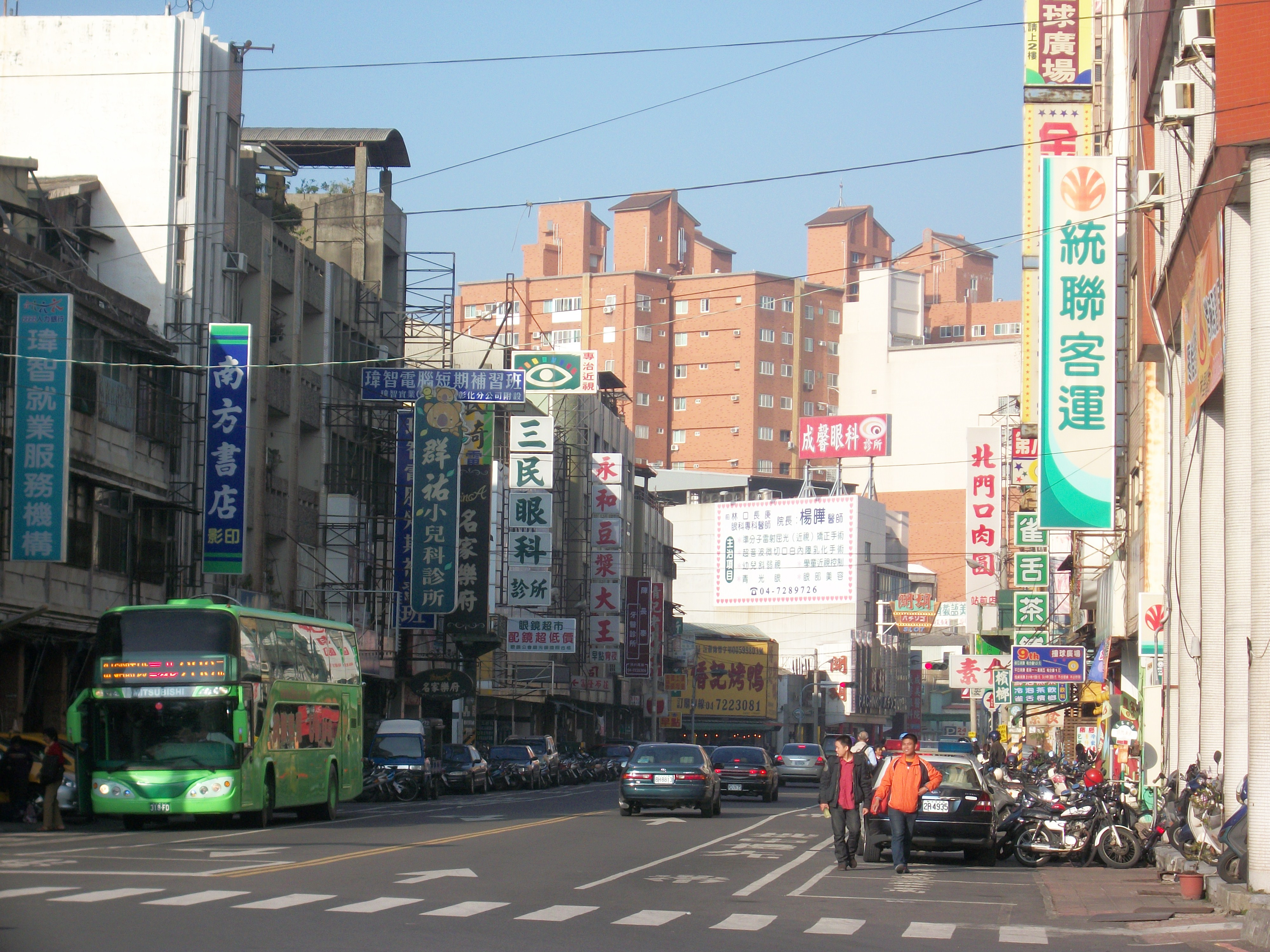
Changhua City, the capital of Changhua County

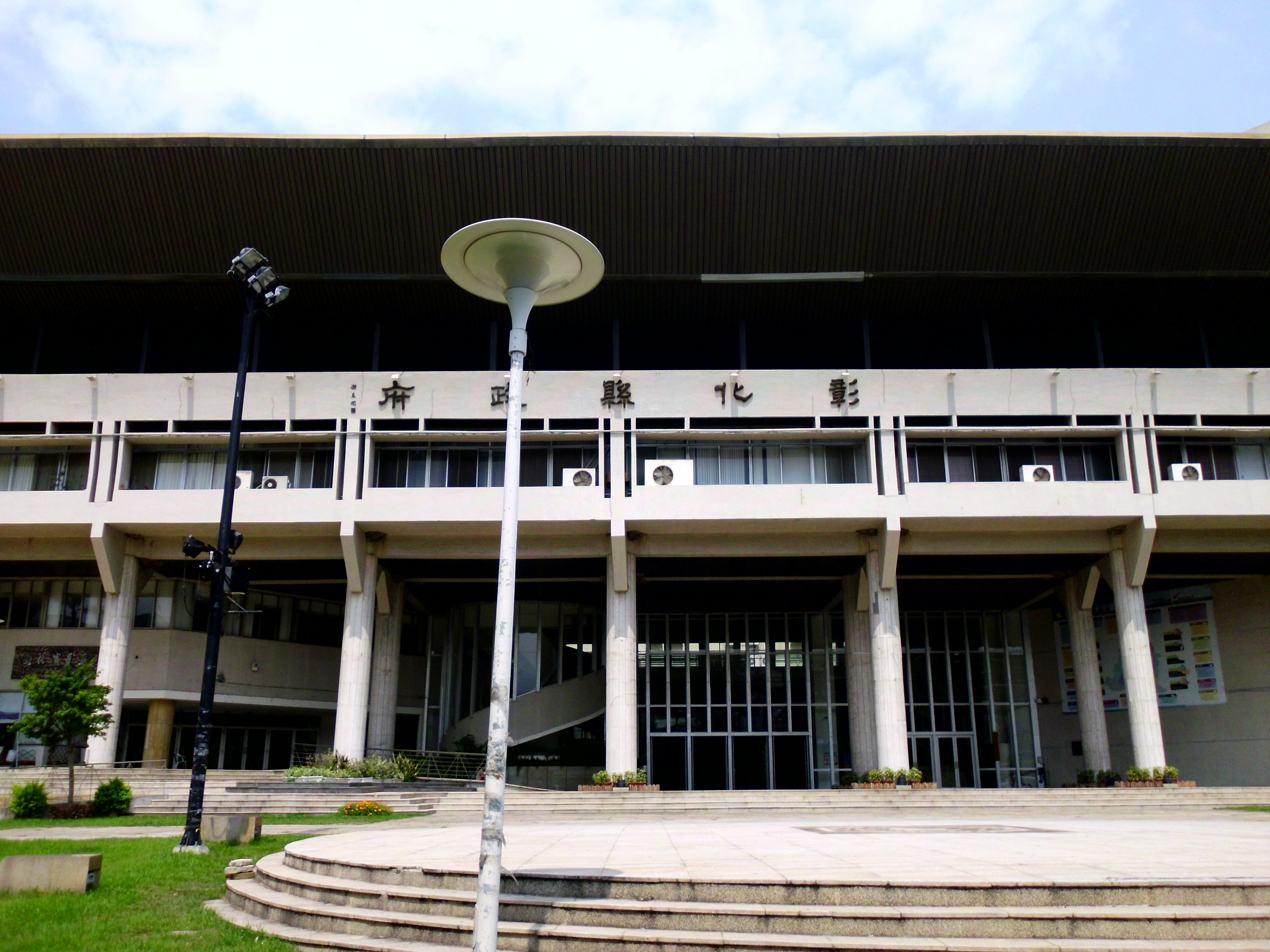
Changhua County Government

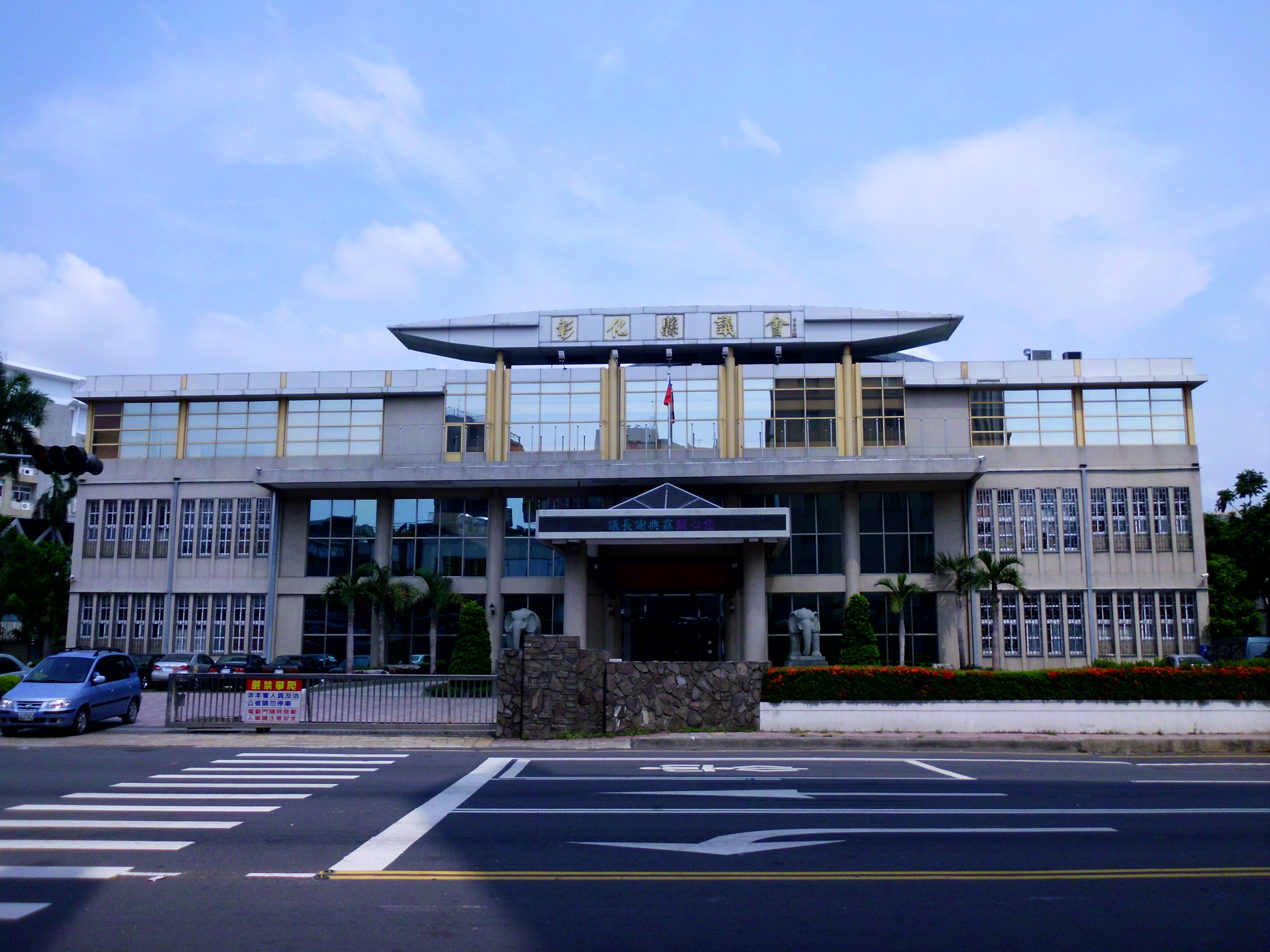
Changhua County Council

Historical population
Year	Pop.	±%
1947	635,719	—
1951	706,211	+11.1%
1956	799,976	+13.3%
1961	898,565	+12.3%
1966	991,538	+10.3%
1971	1,063,242	+7.2%
1976	1,117,676	+5.1%
1981	1,180,612	+5.6%
1986	1,226,231	+3.9%
1991	1,254,228	+2.3%
1996	1,292,482	+3.1%
2001	1,313,994	+1.7%
2006	1,315,034	+0.1%
2011	1,303,039	−0.9%
2016	1,287,146	−1.2%
2021	1,255,330	−2.5%
Source: 1. "臺中縣人口統計表 (1947-1948)" (pdf). 臺中縣統計要覽 (Report). Vol. 中華民國36-37年(38.11). 臺中縣: 臺中縣政府主計室. Nov 1949. pp. 18–71.; 2. "彰化縣現住人口 (1950-1969)" (pdf). 彰化縣統計年鑑 (Report) (in Chinese (Taiwan)). Vol. 中華民國58年度(59. 6). 彰化縣: 彰化縣政府. Jun 1970. pp. 22–37.; 3. "彰化縣現住人口 (1966-1980)" (pdf). 彰化縣統計要覽 (Report) (in Chinese (Taiwan)). Vol. 中華民國69年度(70. 8). 彰化縣: 彰化縣政府. Aug 1981. pp. 16–31.; 4. "縣市人口按性別及五齡組(63)" (in Chinese (Taiwan)). 內政部戶政司 (Ministry of the Interior Population Census).

Changhua County is divided into 2 cities, 6 urban townships and 18 rural townships. Changhua City is the seat of the county which houses the Changhua County Government and Changhua County Council. Changhua County has the highest number of urban townships of all counties in Taiwan. It also has the second highest number of rural townships after Pingtung County. The current Magistrate of Changhua County is Wang Huei-mei of the Kuomintang.

Type	Name	Chinese	Taiwanese	Hakka
Cities	Changhua City	彰化市	Chiong-hòa or Chiang-hòa	Chông-fa
Cities	Yuanlin City	員林市	Oân-lîm	Yèn-lìm
Urban townships	Beidou	北斗鎮	Pó-táu	Pet-téu
Urban townships	Erlin (Erhlin)	二林鎮	Jī-lîm	Ngi-lìm
Urban townships	Hemei	和美鎮	Hô-bí	Fò-mî
Urban townships	Lukang	鹿港鎮	Lo̍k-káng	Lu̍k-kóng
Urban townships	Tianzhong (Tianjhong)	田中鎮	Tiân-tiong	Thièn-chûng
Urban townships	Xihu (Sihu)	溪湖鎮	Khe-ô͘	Hâi-fù
Rural townships	Dacheng	大城鄉	Toā-siâⁿ	Thai-sàng
Rural townships	Dacun	大村鄉	Tāi-chhoan	Thai-tshûn
Rural townships	Ershui (Erhshui)	二水鄉	Jī-chúi	Ngi-súi
Rural townships	Fangyuan	芳苑鄉	Hong-oán	Fông-yen
Rural townships	Fenyuan	芬園鄉	Hun-hn̂g	Fûn-yèn
Rural townships	Fuxing (Fusing)	福興鄉	Hok-heng	Fuk-hîn
Rural townships	Huatan	花壇鄉	Hoe-toâⁿ	Fâ-thàn
Rural townships	Pitou	埤頭鄉	Pi-thâu	Phî-thèu
Rural townships	Puxin (Pusin)	埔心鄉	Po͘-sim	Phû-sîm
Rural townships	Puyan	埔鹽鄉	Po͘-iâm	Phû-yàm
Rural townships	Shenkang (Shengang)	伸港鄉	Sin-káng	Tshûn-kóng
Rural townships	Shetou	社頭鄉	Siā-thâu	Sa-thèu
Rural townships	Tianwei	田尾鄉	Chhân-boé	Thièn-mî
Rural townships	Xianxi (Siansi; Hsienhsi)	線西鄉	Soàⁿ-sai	Sien-sî
Rural townships	Xiushui (Sioushuei)	秀水鄉	Siù-chúi	Siu-súi
Rural townships	Xizhou (Sijhou)	溪州鄉	Khe-chiu	Hâi-chû
Rural townships	Yongjing	永靖鄉	Éng-chēng	Yún-tshìn
Rural townships	Zhutang (Jhutang; Chutang)	竹塘鄉	Tek-tn̂g	Tsuk-thòng

View source data.

== Electoral politics ==
Changhua County, an electoral bellwether, is seen as a political battleground between the Kuomintang (KMT) and the Democratic Progressive Party (DPP). While it has historically favored the KMT, recent elections have swung in the direction of the DPP.

=== County Magistrate ===
The Changhua County Magistrate is the democratically elected chief executive officer of the county. The current incumbent is Wang Huei-Mei of the Kuomintang.

Election	Winner	Party	Runner-up	Party	Majority
2001	Wong Chin-chu	DPP	Yeh Chin-fong	KMT	44,080
2005	Cho Po-yuan	KMT	Wong Chin-chu	DPP	99,841
2009	Cho Po-yuan	KMT	Wong Chin-chu	DPP	71,444
2014	Wei Ming-ku	DPP	Lin Tsang-min	KMT	101,667

=== Legislative Yuan ===
Since the reorganization of the Legislative Yuan into a 113-member chamber in 2008, Changhua has been divided into four constituencies, each of which return one legislator. In 2011 the incumbent in Changhua 1, Chen Shou-ching, died in office. Because there was less than a year left on her term in office, the seat was left vacant until the 2012 election. In 2014 a by-election was held in Changhua 4 after Wei Ming-ku was elected as Changhua County Magistrate.

Constituency	Administrative areas	2008 election		2012 election		2014 by-election		2016 election	
Constituency	Administrative areas	Legislator	Party	Legislator	Party	Legislator	Party	Legislator	Party
Changhua 1	Shengang, Xianxi, Hemei, Lukang, Fuxing, Xiushui	Chen Shou-ching	KMT	Wang Hui-mei	KMT	No change		Wang Hui-mei	KMT
Changhua 2	Changhua City, Huatan, Fenyuan	Lin Tsang-min	KMT	Lin Tsang-min	KMT	No change		Huang Hsiu-fang	DPP
Changhua 3	Fenyuan, Erlin, Puyan, Xihu, Puxin, Dacheng, Zhutang, Pitou, Beidou, Xizhou	Cheng Ju-fen	KMT	Cheng Ju-fen	KMT	No change		Hung Tsung-yi	DPP
Changhua 4	Dacun, Yuanlin, Yongjing, Shetou, Tianwei, Tianzhong, Ershui	Hsiao Ching-tien	KMT	Wei Ming-ku	DPP	Chen Su-yue	DPP	Chen Su-yue	DPP

== Culture ==
=== Changhua County in films ===
- You Are the Apple of My Eye

== Economy ==
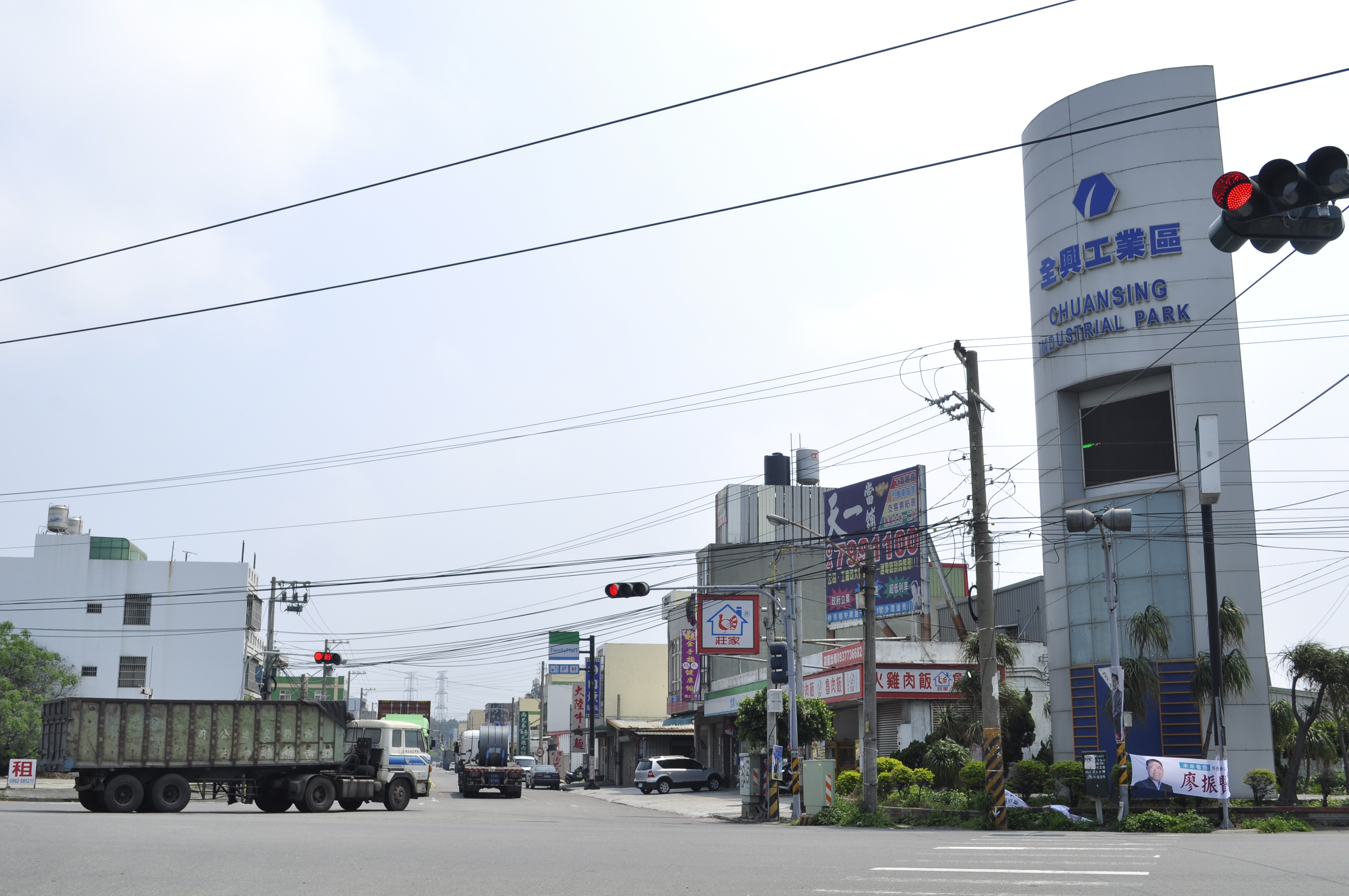
Chuansing Industrial Park in Shengang Township.

Lukang used to be the economic hub of central Taiwan in its early years where it was a commercially prosperous area. It was an important trading port during the Qing Dynasty.

=== Farming ===
Around 1,200 hectares of total land used for growing fruits in the county is used for grape cultivation with Xihu Township acts as the largest grape production hub in the county.

== Education ==
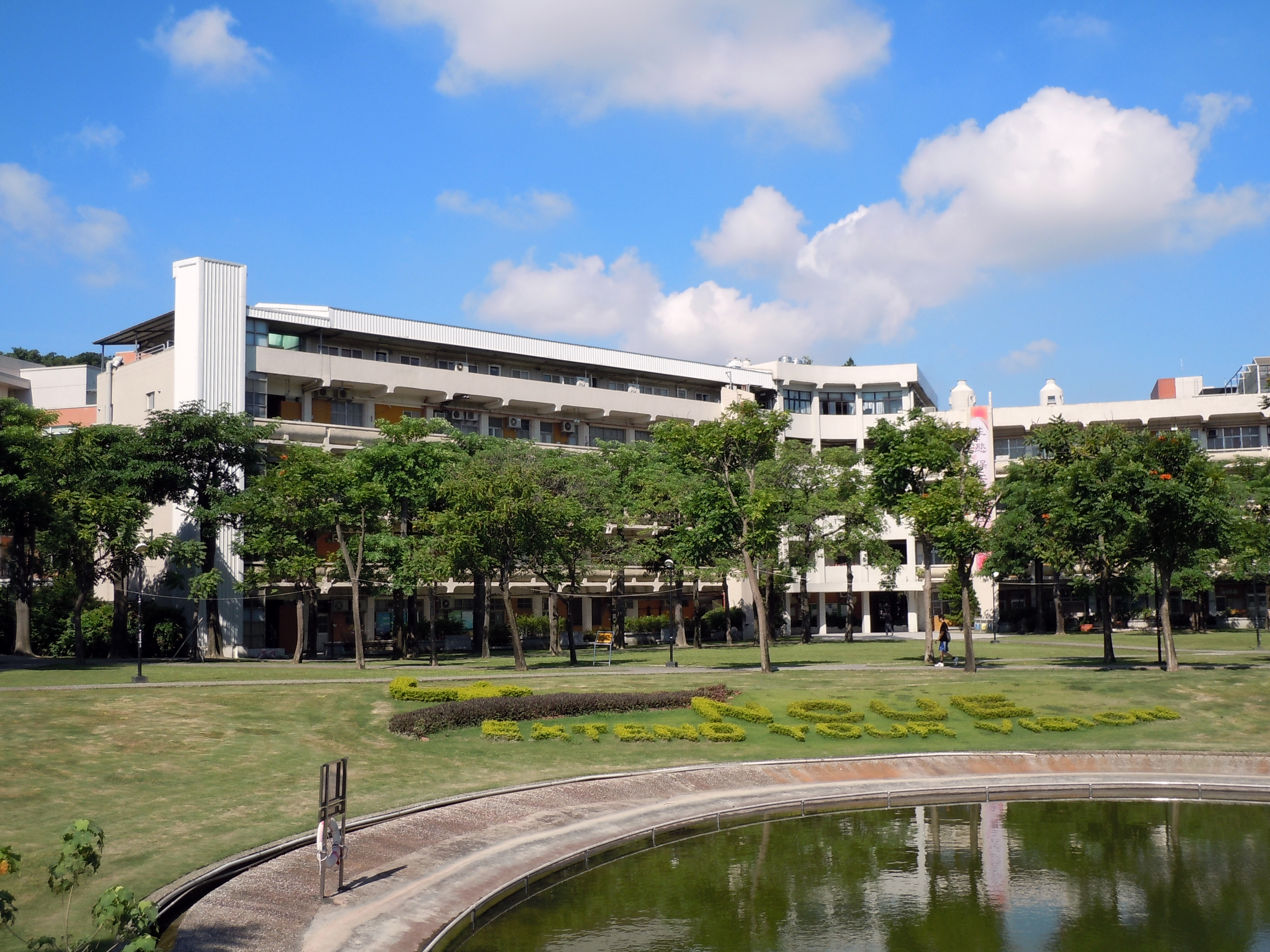
National Changhua University of Education

- National Changhua University of Education
- Dayeh University
- Chienkuo Technology University
- Chung Chou University of Science and Technology

== Energy ==
Changhua County is home to Taiwan's two gas-fired power plants, Hsingyuan Power Plant and Hsingneng Power Plant, with a capacity of 490 MW each. Both power plants are located in Lukang Township.

In August 2016, the Changhua County Government signed an agreement with Canada's Northland Power and Singapore's Yushan Energy to develop "Hai Long", a 1,200 MW-capacity offshore wind generation project spread over 2,300 km^{2} (890 sq mi) off the coast of the county.

With an installed capacity of 188.5 MW from 83 onshore wind turbine, Changhua County has the largest wind energy capacity of any county, municipality or city in Taiwan. As of 2015, there were 21 offshore wind farms located in the water offshore of the county.

== Tourism ==
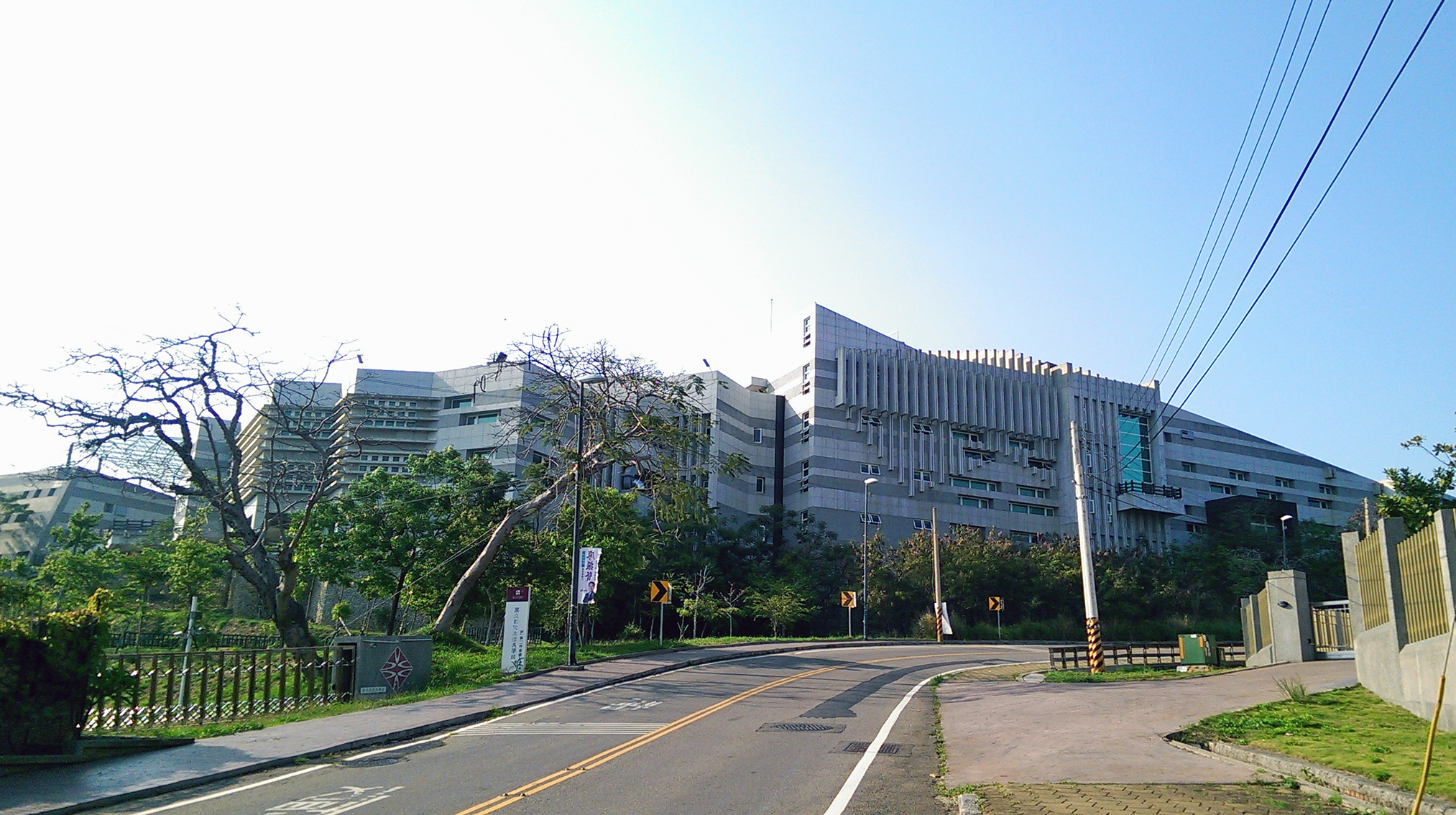
National Changhua Living Art Center

Changhua was one of the cultural centers of Taiwan, with a lot of ancient monuments and structures left from the Qing Dynasty, including the Confucian Temple, Tian Ho Gung, built in Lukang in 1647. There are currently 6 National Certified Historical Monuments, 42 County Certified Historical Monuments, 67 Historical Infrastructures, and 1 Cultural Center in Changhua County.

=== Museums ===
Museums in the county include the BRAND'S Health Museum, Changhua County Art Museum and Lukang Folk Arts Museum.

=== Art and culture centers ===
The county is home to the following art and culture centers, which are Changhua Arts Hall, Lukang Culture Center and National Changhua Living Art Center.

=== Temples ===
Temples in Changhua County are

- Baozang Temple (芬園寶藏寺): built in 1672 and dedicated to Guanyin Bodhisattva, designated as a third grade historic building
- Changhua Confucian Temple (彰化孔廟): built in 1726 and renovated in 1830, is a Grade 1 national historical site
- Dian'an Temple (北斗奠安宮): founded 1684-1718 in Xizhou as a Mazu Temple, moved to Beidou in 1806
- Hushan Temple (虎山巖): built in 1747 and dedicated to Guanyin Bodhisattva
- Kaihua Temple (彰化開化寺) : originally constructed in 1724 as Guanyin Shrine
- Lukang Longshan Temple (鹿港龍山寺) : first built in 1738, renowned for its exquisite woodcarvings, as well as for its stone sculptures, especially the 12 major support columns in the main hall, twined by auspicious dragons hewn from solid stone
- Lukang Wen Wu Temple (鹿港文武廟) : first built in 1806, consists of Martial Temple (武廟), Literature Shrine (文祠) and Wenkai Academy (文開書院)
- Nanyao Temple (彰化南瑤宮) : completed in 1738 and originally named Mazu Temple, designated as a third grade historic building
- Shetou Doushan Temple (社頭斗山祠) : built in 1880, ancestral temple of "Xiao" (蕭) clan
- Yuanching Temple (元清觀) : constructed in 1763, one of the earliest temple in Taiwan that is dedicated to Jade Emperor

=== Nature ===
Nature tourism in the county are Alice's Garden and Changhua Fitzroy Gardens.

=== Historical buildings ===
Historical buildings in the county are the Changhua Wude Hall, Daodong Tutorial Academy, Fuxing Barn, Lukang Ai Gate, Lukang Kinmen Hall, Lukang Rimao Hang, Luocuo Church, Spring of Youth, Yi Yuan Mansion and Yusan Hall.

== Transportation ==
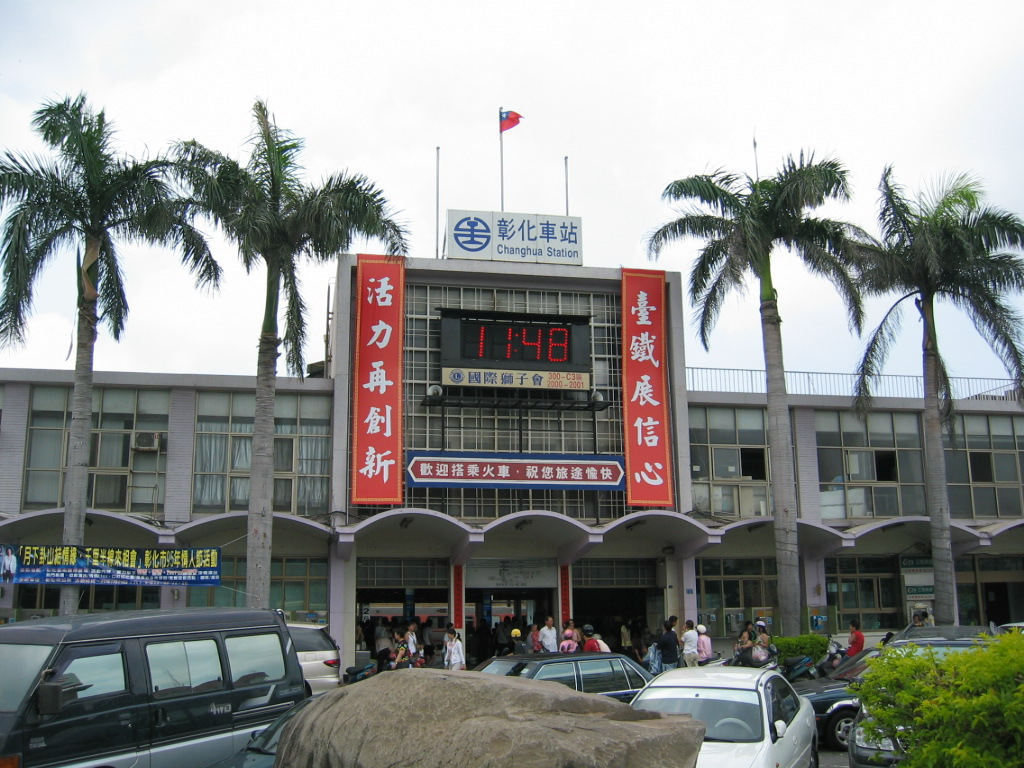
TRA Changhua railway station

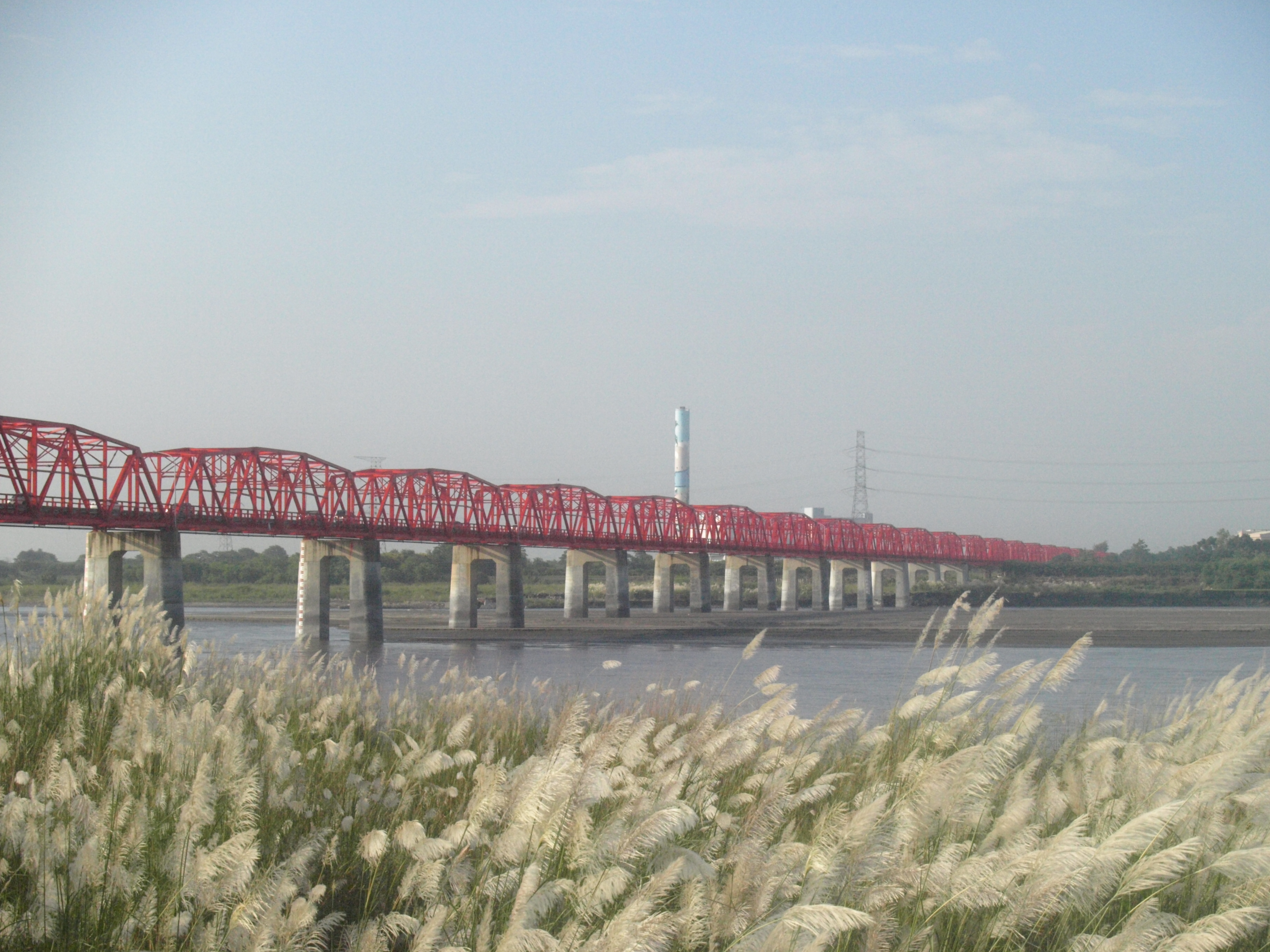
Xiluo Bridge

=== Rail ===
There are 8 stations in Changhua County of the Taiwan Railway (TR), with the largest being Changhua located in Changhua City. The rest are: Huatan, Dacun, Yuanlin, Yongjing, Shetou, Tianzhong and Ershui.

Taiwan High Speed Rail has also one station in the county, which is Changhua HSR station.

=== Road ===
National Highway 1 and National Highway 3 both pass through Changhua County. In addition, there are plenty of provincial highways as well. The Xiluo Bridge, with a span over 1,900 meters and opened in 1953, links Changhua County with neighboring Yunlin County.

== Sports ==
Changhau has one professional basketball team, the Formosa Taishin Dreamers of the P. League+ (shared with Taichung).

== Sister cities ==
- Nagano Prefecture, Japan (2008)

== Notable individuals ==
- Giddens Ko, Taiwanese novelist and filmmaker
- Chou Ting-shan, Taiwanese writer
- Hsieh Nan-kuang, activist and politician
- Wang Hsin, photographer
- Chen Shu-ming, artist
