= List of temples in Taiwan =

This is a list of notable temples in Taiwan associated with Chinese folk religion, mostly Buddhism, Taoism, and Confucianism. Religious affiliation is based on what each temple registered as to the Ministry of the Interior, though temples often incorporate elements from other sects.

== Northern Taiwan ==
=== Taipei City ===
Name		Location	Completed	Affiliation	Main Deity
Chen Dexing Ancestral Hall	陳德星堂	Datong	1892	Ancestral shrine	(none)
Ciyou Temple	松山慈祐宮	Songshan	1753	Taoism	Mazu
Dalongdong Baoan Temple	大龍峒保安宮	Datong	1742	Taoism	Baosheng Dadi
Guandu Temple	關渡宮	Beitou	1712	Taoism	Mazu
Confucian Temple	臺北孔子廟	Datong	1879	Confucianism	Confucius
Hui Chi Temple	芝山巖惠濟宮	Shilin	1764	Taoism	Kaizhang Shengwang
Jinde Temple	晉德宮	Wanhua			
Linji Huguo Chan Temple	臨濟護國禪寺	Zhongshan	1911	Buddhism	Sakyamuni Buddha
Lungshan Temple	艋舺龍山寺	Wanhua	1738	Buddhism	Guanyin
Nung Chan Monastery	農禪寺	Beitou	1975	Buddhism	Sakyamuni Buddha
Qingshui Temple	艋舺清水巖	Wanhua	1787	Buddhism	Qingshui Zushi
Shandao Temple	善導寺	Zhongzheng	1926	Buddhism	Sakyamuni Buddha
Shennong Temple	士林神農宮	Shilin	1709	Taoism	Shennong
Xia-Hai City God Temple	大稻埕霞海城隍廟	Datong	1859	Taoism	Cheng Huang Ye
Xingtian Temple	行天宮	Zhongshan	1967	Taoism	Guangong
Zhinan Temple	指南宮	Muzha	1890	Taoism	Chunyang Zushi

=== Keelung City ===
Name		Location	Completed	Affiliation	Main Deity
Ande Temple	暖暖安德宮	Nuannuan	1801	Taoism	Mazu
Xian Dong Yan	仙洞巖	Zhongshan District	1875	Buddhism	Guanyin

=== New Taipei City ===
Name		Location	Completed	Affiliation	Main Deity
Changfu Temple	三峽長福巖	Sanxia	1767	Taoism	Qingshui Zushi
Dharma Drum Mountain	法鼓山	Jinshan	1989	Buddhism	Sakyamuni Buddha
Sanchong Yi Tian Temple	三重義天殿	Sanchong	1965	Taoism	Mazu
Temple of the Eighteen Lords	乾華十八王公廟	Shimen	1975	Taoism	The Eighteen Lords
Xizhi Gongbei Temple	汐止拱北殿	Xizhi	1966	Taoism	Chunyang Zushi

=== Taoyuan City ===
Name		Location	Completed	Affiliation	Main Deity
Confucian Temple	桃園孔子廟	Taoyuan	1989	Confucianism	Confucius
Furen Temple	福仁宮	Daxi	1813	Taoism	Kaizhang Shengwang
Tianhou Temple	新屋天后宮	Xinwu	1826	Taoism	Mazu

=== Hsinchu City ===
Name		Location	Completed	Affiliation	Main Deity
Chenghuang Temple	新竹都城隍廟	North	1748	Taoism	Cheng Huang Ye

=== Hsinchu County ===
Name		Location	Completed	Affiliation	Main Deity
Citian Temple	北埔慈天宮	Beipu	1846	Buddhism	Guanyin

=== Miaoli County ===
Name		Location	Completed	Affiliation	Main Deity
Cihyu Temple	中港慈裕宮	Zhunan	1685	Taoism	Mazu
Gongtian Temple	白沙屯拱天宮	Tongxiao	1863	Taoism	Mazu
Maling Temple	媽靈宮	Houlong	1930	Taoism	Wang Baoying
Shuntian Temple	苑裡房裡順天宮	Yuanli	1856	Taoism	Mazu
Xuanwang Temple	宣王宮	Xihu	1840	Confucianism	Confucius
Wenchang Temple	苗栗文昌祠	Miaoli	1885	Taoism	Wenchang Dijun
Yuqing Temple	苗栗玉清宮	Miaoli	1906	Taoism	Guangong

== Central Taiwan ==
=== Taichung City ===
Name		Location	Completed	Affiliation	Main Deity
Taichung Confucian Temple	臺中孔子廟	North	1976	Confucianism	Confucius
Haotian Temple	大庄浩天宮	Wuqi	1856	Taoism	Mazu
Jenn Lann Temple	大甲鎮瀾宮	Dajia	1730	Taoism	Mazu
Lecheng Temple	樂成宮	East	1790	Taoism	Mazu
Lin Family Ancestral Shrine	林氏宗祠	East	1930	Ancestral shrine	(none)
Songzhu Temple	松竹寺	Beitun	1833	Buddhism	Guanyin
Wanhe Temple	萬和宮	Nantun	1726	Taoism	Mazu
Wenchang Temple	北屯文昌廟	Beitun	1871	Taoism	Wenchang Dijun
Yuanbao Temple	元保宮	North	1791	Taoism	Baosheng Dadi
Zhang Family Temple	張家祖廟	Xitun	1904	Ancestral shrine	(none)
Zhang Liao Family Temple	張廖家廟	East	1911	Ancestral shrine	(none)
Zhenwu Temple	梧棲真武宮	Wuqi	1849	Taoism	Xuantian Shangdi
Zi Yun Yan	紫雲巖	Qingshui	1662	Buddhism	Guanyin

=== Changhua County ===
Name		Location	Completed	Affiliation	Main Deity
Baozang Temple	寶藏寺	Fenyuan	1672	Taoism	Guanyin
Biyun Chan Temple	碧雲禪寺	Ershui	1920	Buddhism	Guanyin
Confucian Temple	彰化孔子廟	Changhua	1726	Confucianism	Confucius
Dian'an Temple	北斗奠安宮	Beidou	1806	Taoism	Mazu
Doushan Temple	社頭斗山祠	Shetou	1880	Ancestral shrine	(none)
Fu'an Temple	伸港福安宮	Shengang	1677	Taoism	Mazu
Fuhai Temple	王功福海宮	Fangyuan	1812	Taoism	Mazu
Hushan Temple	虎山巖	Huatan	1747	Buddhism	Guanyin
Kaihua Temple	開化寺	Changhua	1724	Buddhism	Guanyin
Kinmen Hall	鹿港金門館	Lukang	1805	Taoism	Sufu Wangye
Longshan Temple	鹿港龍山寺	Lukang	1653	Buddhism	Guanyin
Nanyao Temple	南瑤宮	Changhua	1738	Taoism	Mazu
Shengwang Temple	聖王廟	Changhua	1761	Taoism	Kaizhang Shengwang
Shunze Temple	埔鹽順澤宮	Puyan	1998	Taoism	Xuantian Shangdi
Tianhou Temple	鹿港天后宮	Lukang	1591	Taoism	Mazu
Tianmen Temple	枋橋頭天門宮	Shetou	1755	Taoism	Mazu
Wenwu Temple	鹿港文武廟	Lukang	1806	Taoism	Guangong, Wenchang Dijun
Xian'an Temple	大城咸安宮	Dacheng	1928	Taoism	Baosheng Dadi
Yuanching Temple	元清觀	Changhua	1763	Taoism	Jade Emperor

=== Nantou County ===
Name		Location	Completed	Affiliation	Main Deity
Chung Tai Chan Monastery	中台禪寺	Puli	2001	Buddhism	Sakyamuni Buddha
Shilong Temple	石龍宮	Zhongliao	Unknown	Taoism	Tudigong
Shoutian Temple	松柏嶺受天宮	Mingjian	1657	Taoism	Xuantian Shangdi
Wenwu Temple	日月潭文武廟	Yuchi	1938	Taoism	Guangong
Xuanzang Temple	玄奘寺	Yuchi	1965	Buddhism	Sakyamuni Buddha
Zinan Temple	竹山紫南宮	Zhushan	1745	Taoism	Tudigong

=== Yunlin County ===
Name		Location	Completed	Affiliation	Main Deity
Chaotian Temple	朝天宮	Beigang	1694	Taoism	Mazu
Gongfan Temple	麥寮拱範宮	Mailiao	1742	Taoism	Mazu
Guangfu Temple	西螺廣福宮	Xiluo	1764	Taoism	Mazu
Yong'an Temple	楊厝永安宮	Mailiao	1991	Taoism	Kaizhang Shengwang

== Southern Taiwan ==
=== Chiayi City ===
Name		Location	Completed	Affiliation	Main Deity
Cheng Huang Temple	嘉義城隍廟	East	1715	Taoism	Cheng Huang Ye
Confucian Temple	嘉義孔子廟	East	1706	Confucianism	Confucius
Chiayi Jen Wu Temple	嘉義仁武宮	East	1677	Taoism	Baosheng Dadi

=== Chiayi County ===
Name		Location	Completed	Affiliation	Main Deity
Fengtian Temple	新港奉天宮	Xingang	1811	Taoism	Mazu
Gangkou Temple	笨港口港口宮	Dongshi	1684	Taoism	Mazu
Peitian Temple	配天宮	Puzi	1682	Taoism	Mazu
Shuixian Temple	笨港水仙宮	Xingang	1739	Taoism	Shuixian Zunwang
Tianhou Temple	笨港天后宮	Xingang	1998	Taoism	Mazu
Yuanshan Temple	圓山宮	Lucao	1755	Taoism	Wangsun Dashi

=== Tainan City ===
Name		Location	Completed	Affiliation	Main Deity
Beiji Temple	北極殿	West Central	Yongli era	Taoism	Xuantian Shangdi
Confucian Temple	臺南孔子廟	West Central	1665	Confucianism	Confucius
Daitian Temple	麻豆代天府	Madou	1955	Taoism	Wufu Qiansui
Grand Matsu Temple	大天后宮	West Central	1664	Taoism	Mazu
Kaiyuan Temple	開元寺	North	1690	Buddhism	Sakyamuni Buddha
Koxinga Ancestral Shrine	鄭成功祖廟	West Central	1663	Ancestral shrine	Koxinga
Liu Clan Shrine	劉家宗祠	Liouying	1871	Ancestral shrine	(none)
State Temple of the Martial God	祀典武廟	West Central	1663	Taoism	Guangong
Temple of the Five Concubines	五妃廟	West Central	1683	Taoism	Five concubines of Zhu Shugui
Tianhou Temple	安平開臺天后宮	Anping	1668	Taoism	Mazu

=== Kaohsiung City ===
Name		Location	Completed	Affiliation	Main Deity
Chi Ming Palace	啟明堂	Zuoying	1899	Confucianism	Confucius
Cide Temple	店仔頂慈德宮	Zuoying	1687	Taoism	Mazu
Cih Ji Palace	左營慈濟宮	Zuoying	1719	Taoism	Baosheng Dadi
Confuciuan Temple	高雄孔子廟	Zuoying	1976	Confucianism	Confucius
Daitian Temple	鼓山代天宮	Gushan	1951	Taoism	Wufu Qiansui
Fenglin Temple	大林蒲鳳林宮	Siaogang	1697	Taoism	Ong Yah
Fo Guang Shan Monastery	佛光山寺	Dashu	1967	Buddhism	Sakyamuni Buddha
Hong Fa Temple	宏法寺	Sinsing	1964	Buddhism	Sakyamuni Buddha
Longshan Temple	鳳山龍山寺	Fongshan	Qianlong era	Buddhism	Guanyin
Qingshui Temple	洲仔清水宮	Zuoying	1938	Taoism	Qingshui Zushi
Spring and Autumn Pavilions	春秋閣	Zuoying	1953	Taoism	Guangong
Tiangong Temple	鳳山天公廟	Fongshan	1798	Taoism	Jade Emperor
Tianhou Temple	旗津天后宮	Cijin	1673	Taoism	Mazu

=== Pingtung County ===
Name		Location	Completed	Affiliation	Main Deity
Chaolin Temple	朝林宮	Chaozhou	1909	Taoism	Nezha
Donglong Temple	東港東隆宮	Donggang	1706	Taoism	Wenfu Qiansui
Fu'an Temple	車城福安宮	Checheng	1662	Taoism	Tudigong
Jiaruipu Temple	加蚋埔公廨	Gaoshu	Unknown	Aboriginal	Ali-zu
Liou Family Ancestral Hall	五溝水劉氏宗祠	Wanluan	1864	Ancestral shrine	(none)
Princess Babao Temple	八寶公主廟	Hengchun	1931	Taoism	Princess Babao
Three Mountains King Temple	九如三山國王廟	Jiuru	1651	Taoism	Sanshan Guowang
Yang Family Ancestral Hall	楊氏宗祠	Jiadong	1923	Ancestral shrine	(none)
Zhong-Sheng-Gong Memorial	宗聖公祠	Pingtung	1929	Ancestral shrine	(none)

== Eastern Taiwan ==
=== Yilan County ===
Name		Location	Completed	Affiliation	Main Deity
Kailu Xianfengye Temple	開路先鋒爺廟	Su'ao	1994	Taoism	Kailu Xianfengye
Nantian Temple	南方澳南天宮	Su'ao	1956	Taoism	Mazu

=== Hualien County ===
Name		Location	Completed	Affiliation	Main Deity
Xiangde Temple	祥德寺	Xiulin	1968	Buddhism	Ksitigarbha Bodhisattva

=== Taitung County ===
Name		Location	Completed	Affiliation	Main Deity
Kunci Temple	崑慈堂	Luye	1958	Taoism	Xi Wang Mu

== Outlying Islands ==
=== Penghu County ===
Name		Location	Completed	Affiliation	Main Deity
Beiji Temple	東甲北極殿	Magong	Pre-1791	Taoism	Xuantian Shangdi
Chenghuang Temple	媽宮城隍廟	Magong	1779	Taoism	Cheng Huang Ye
Guanyin Temple	觀音亭	Magong	1696	Buddhism	Guanyin
Shigong Temple	施公祠	Magong	1696	Taoism	Shi Lang
Shuixian Temple	澎湖水仙宮	Magong	1696	Taoism	Shuixian Zunwang
Tianhou Temple	澎湖天后宮	Magong	Pre 1604	Taoism	Mazu

=== Kinmen County ===
Name		Location	Completed	Affiliation	Main Deity
Longfeng Temple	官澳龍鳳宮	Jinsha	1611	Taoism	Mazu

=== Lienchiang County ===
Name		Location	Completed	Affiliation	Main Deity
Tianhou Temple	金板境天后宮	Nangan	Jiaqing era	Taoism	Mazu
Tianhou Temple	東引中柳天后宮	Dongyin	Jiaqing era	Taoism	Mazu
