= Yuanshan Temple =

Temple in Chiayi County, Taiwan

- 圓山宮
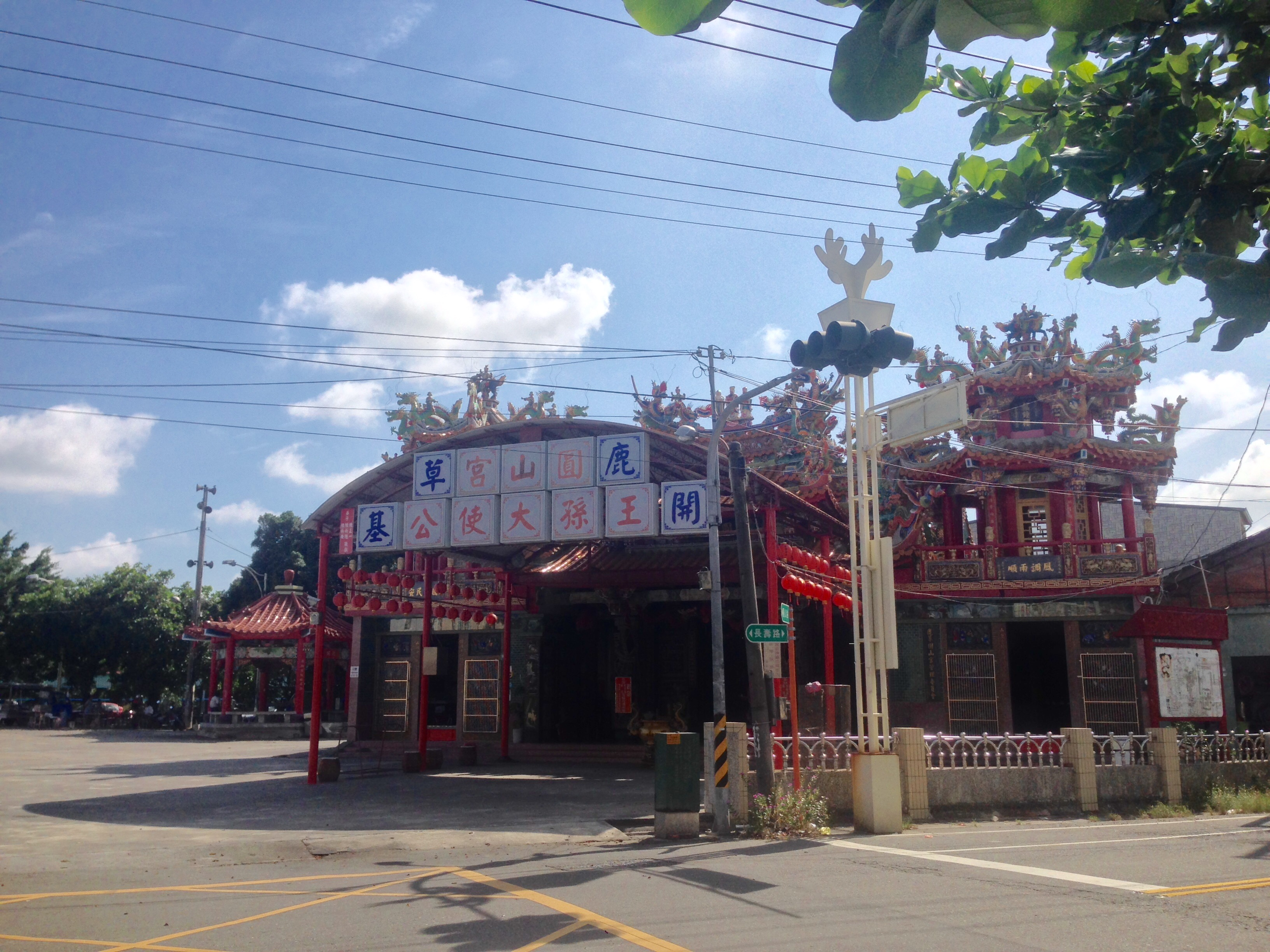

- Location within Taiwan

Religion
- Affiliation: Taoism
- Deity: Wangsun Dashi

Location
- Location: Lucao, Chiayi County
- Country: Taiwan
- Interactive map of Yuanshan Temple
- Coordinates: 23°24′48″N 120°18′22″E

Architecture
- Completed: 1738 or 1752

Specifications
- Direction of façade: East
- Height (max): 1.5 m (4 ft 11 in)

Yuanshan Temple (Chinese: 圓山宮; pinyin: Yuánshān Gōng) is a temple in Lucao Township, Chiayi County, Taiwan. The temple is dedicated to Wangsun Dashi, a legendary child from the Song dynasty.

== History ==
According to legend, Wangsun Dashi (Chinese: 王孫大使) was a child named Xie Shengxian (Chinese: 謝聖賢) that lived during the Song dynasty. When he was thirteen years old, Xie traveled Tong'an, Fujian with his dog and lived in the home of a government official with the surname Chen. One day, the official's daughter was possessed by a river snail yaoguai, so Xie sacrificed himself by jumping into a lake next to Feng Mountain (鳳山). Therefore, the Chen clan deified Xie as Wangsun Dashi and built a temple for him next to the mountain.

The Chen clan migrated across the Taiwan Strait in the Qing dynasty, and brought Wangsun Dashi with them as their protector deity. The clan founded Yuanshan Temple in 1738 or 1752 to worship Wangsun Dashi in Lucao, and the temple became the religious center of the region. The temple has been rebuilt multiple times, the most recently completed in 1976.

== Architecture ==
Yuanshan Temple is located in downtown Lucao and faces east. The main altar houses Wangsun Dashi, while the side altars house Fude Zhengshen and Wangsun Dashi's dog. The temple columns are carved with antithetical couplets, and each line begins with the characters yuan and shan, respectively, except for the columns beside the side altars. Wangsun Dashi's statue is carved with dimples to resemble a boy.

== Traditions ==
=== Geshuihuo ===
Every twelve years, Yuanshan Temple holds a ceremony known as geshuihuo (割水火) on the banks of the Puzi River to symbolically call on wandering spirits to change their ways and assemble into an army under Wangsun Dashi. During the ceremony, a temporary altar is placed on a sand bar, and a flag is placed next to the river. Twelve days later, a procession carries weapons and crosses the river to retrieve the altar and the flag, marking the end of the ceremony.

=== Fanghuoma ===
Historically, Yuanshan Temple has held a ritual known as fanghuoma (放火馬), where paper horses are paraded around and burned, to protect citizens from disease. However, this ritual was not held for roughly 60 years until February 2021, where it was revived for the COVID-19 pandemic.

== See also ==
- Fengtian Temple, Xingang Township
- Gangkou Temple, Dongshi Township
- Peitian Temple, Puzi City
- List of temples in Taiwan
