= Fu'an Temple =

Fu'an Temple is the name of the following temples:

- Checheng Fu'an Temple (車城福安宮) in Pingtung County, Taiwan
- Shengang Fu'an Temple (伸港福安宮) in Changhua County, Taiwan
