= Sanchong Yi Tian Temple =

Taoist temple in Taiwan

- 三重義天宮
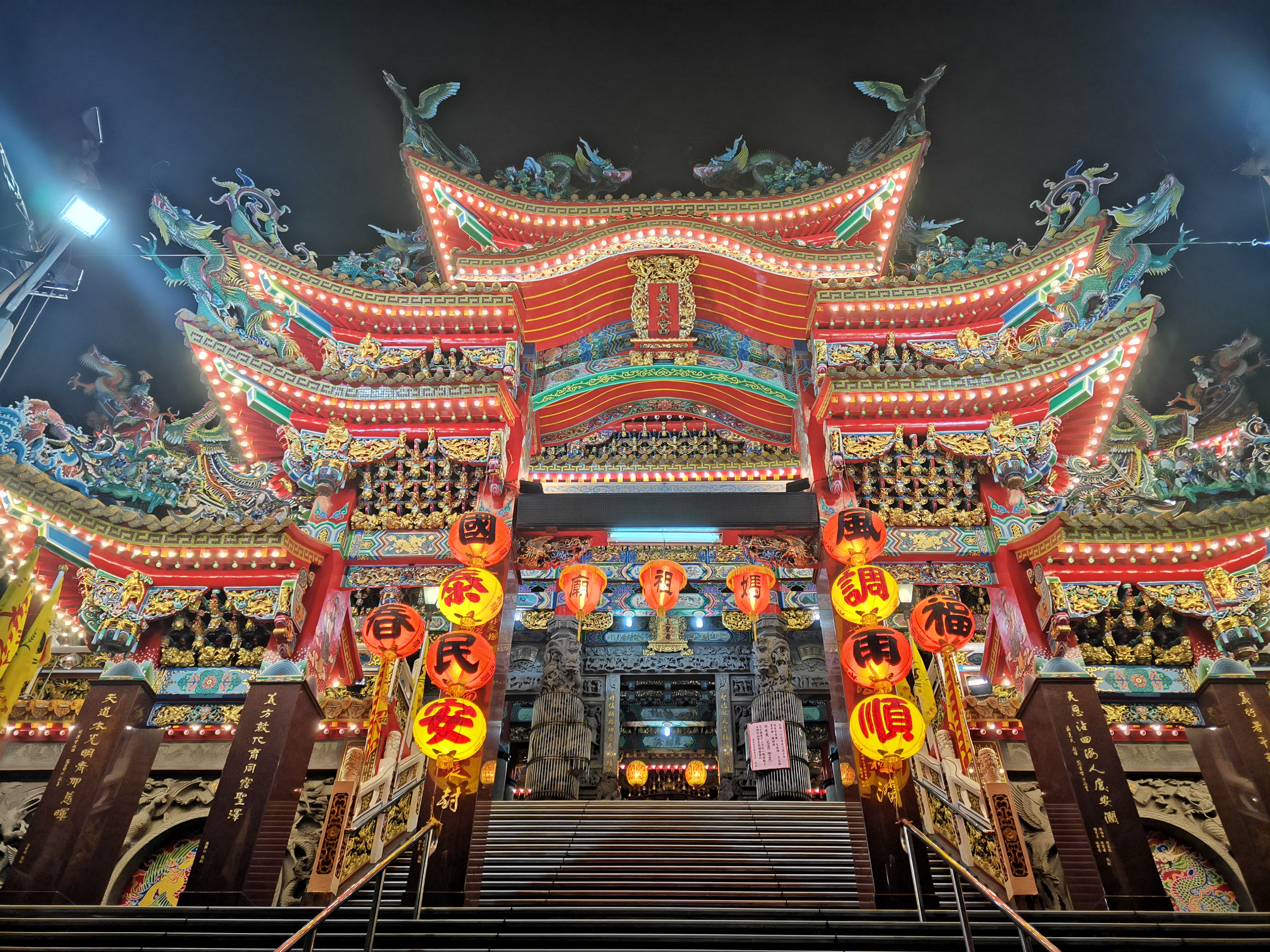

Religion
- Affiliation: Taoism

Location
- Location: No. 150, Chelutou Street, Sanchong District, New Taipei, Taiwan
- Interactive map of Sanchong Yi Tian Temple
- Coordinates: 25.0763°N 121.4836°E

Architecture
- Type: Taoist temple
- Completed: 1965

The Sanchong Yi Tian Temple (Chinese: 三重義天宮; pinyin: sānchóng yì tiāngōng) is a traditional Taoist temple located in Sanchong District, New Taipei, Taiwan. Built in 1965, the sea goddess Mazu is the principal Deity worshiped at Sanchong Yi Tian Temple. The temple is the center of religious worship in the surrounding areas of Sanchong and Luzhou. It is also known locally as Cat Temple as it is famous for providing a shelter for neighborhood stray cats. The front stairway leading to the temple is more than 20 m (66 ft) in length and several red lanterns adorn the front gate. It is believed that these lanterns initially attracted the felines to the temple.

== Transportation ==
The temple is accessible by Sanchong metro station of Taipei Metro.

== Gallery ==
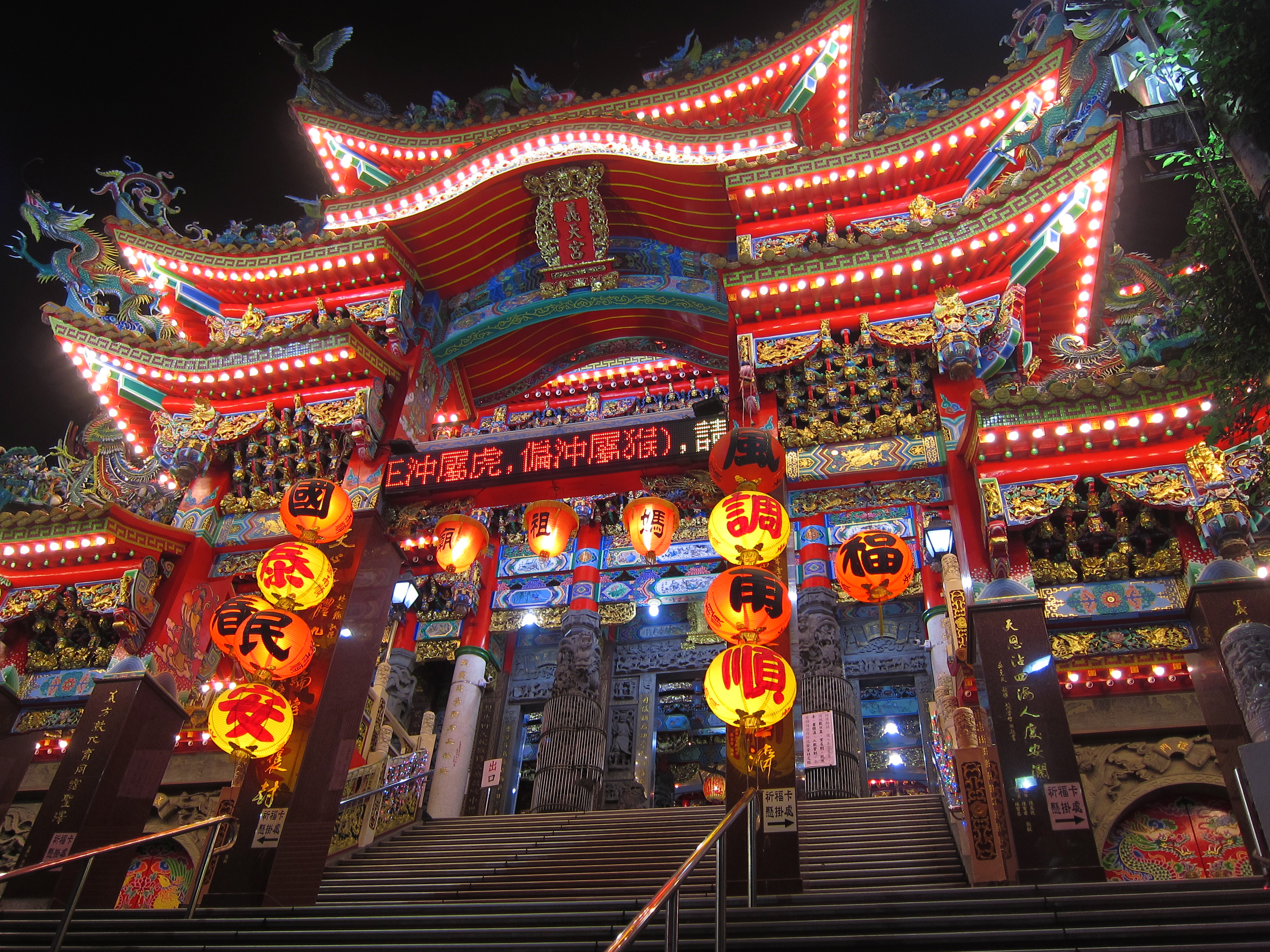
At night

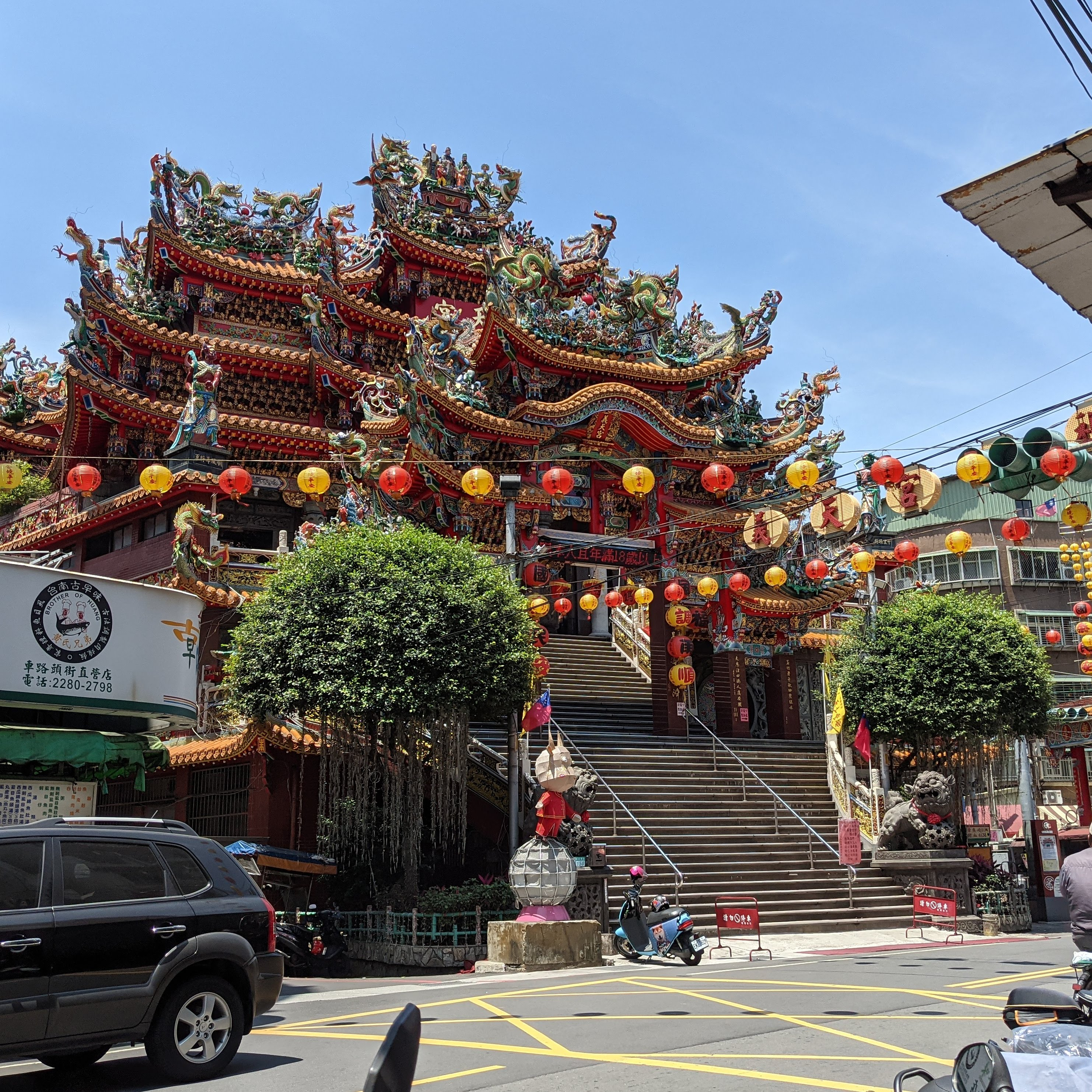

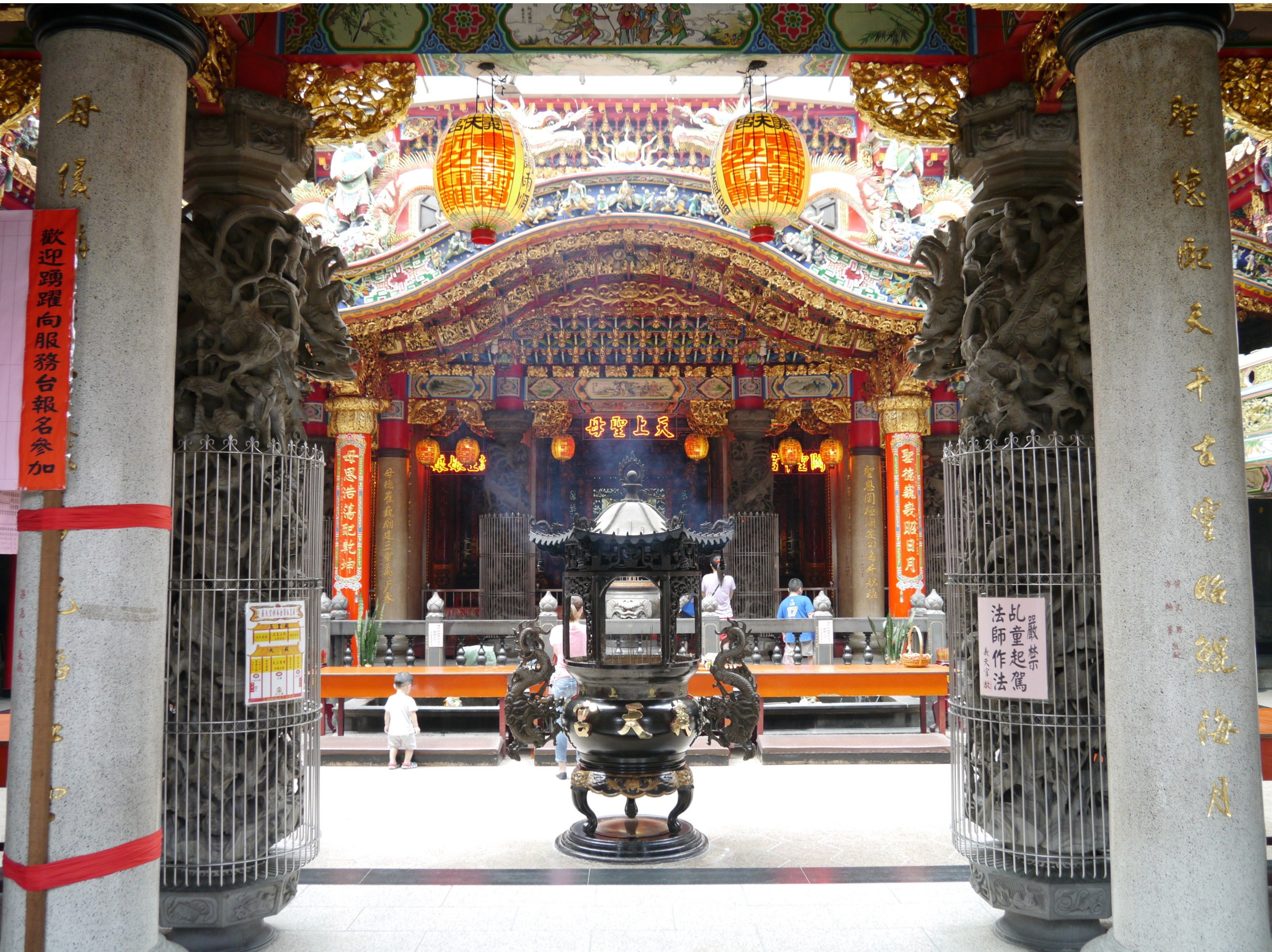

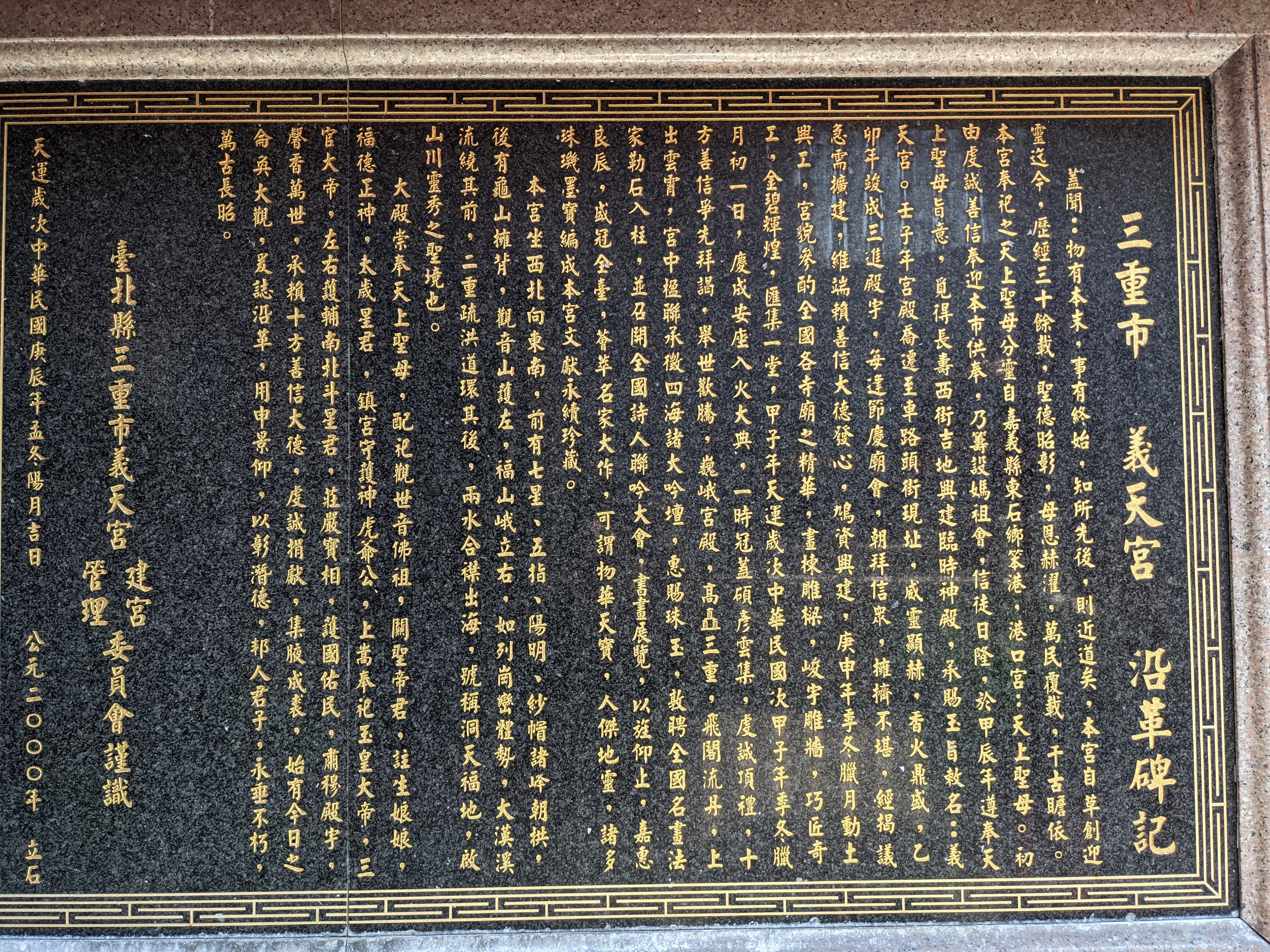
Historical plaque

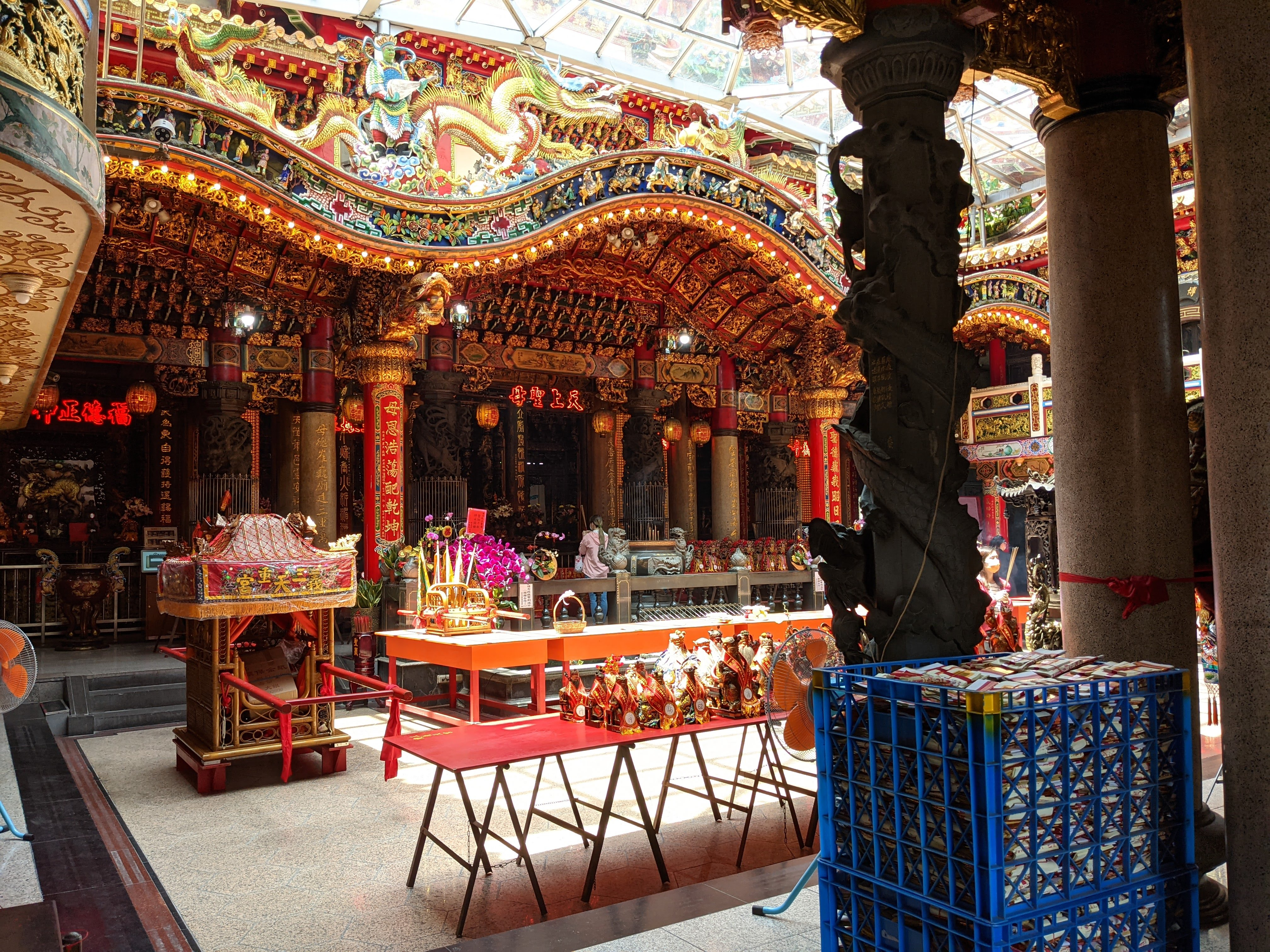

Stray cat

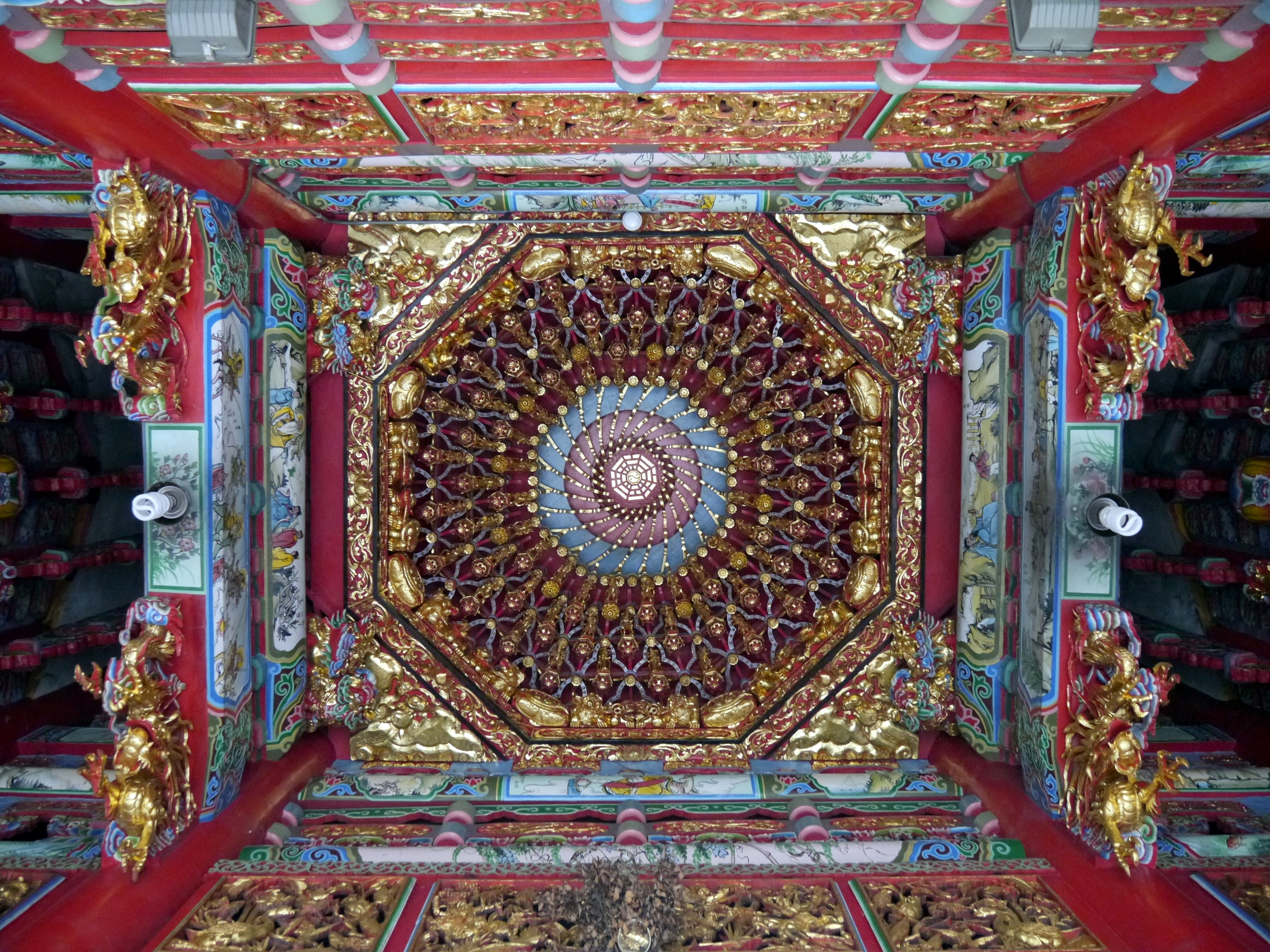
Caisson

== See also ==
- Mazu
- Gangkou Temple (笨港口港口宮) in Chiayi, Taiwan
- List of temples in Taiwan
- Religion in Taiwan
