= Shengang =

Shengang can refer to the following places:

== China ==
- Shengang Subdistrict, Jiangyin (申港街道), Jiangyin, Wuxi, Jiangsu
- Shengang Subdistrict, Pudong (申港街道), Pudong, Shanghai

== Taiwan ==
- Shengang, Changhua (伸港鄉), a rural township in Changhua County
- Shengang, Taichung (神岡區), a district of Taichung
