= Peitian Temple =

Temple in Puzi, Chiayi County, Taiwan

- 配天宮
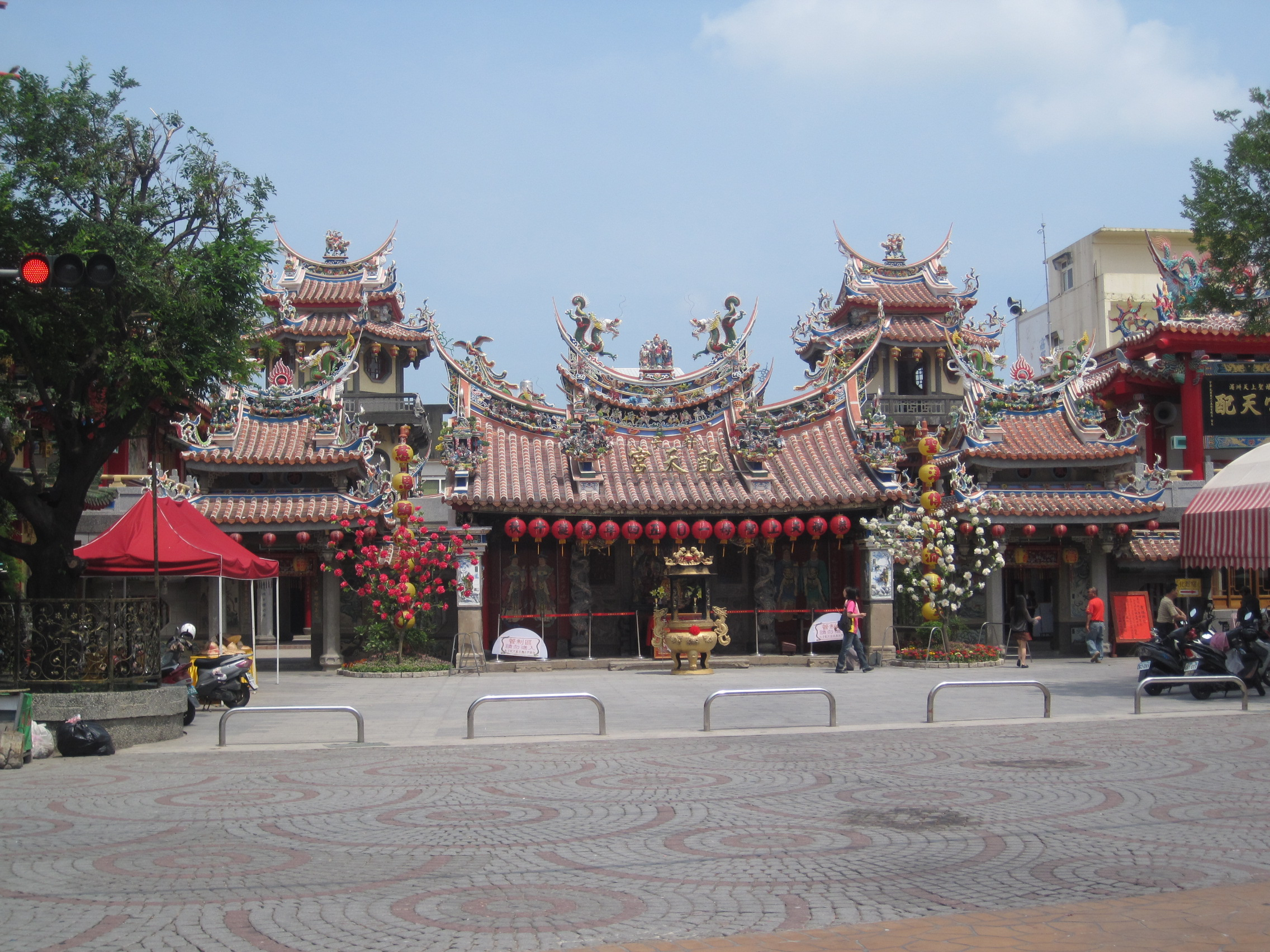

- Location within Chiayi County

Location
- Location: Puzi, Chiayi County, Taiwan
- Interactive map of Peitian Temple
- Coordinates: 23.4679°N 120.2452°E

Architecture
- Type: Temple
- Established: 1682
- Direction of façade: South

The Peitian Temple (Chinese: 配天宮; pinyin: Pèitiān Gōng; Wade–Giles: Pei^{4}-tien^{1} Kung^{1}) is a temple of the folk goddess Mazu at the intersection of Kaiyuan and Guangfu Roads in Puzi City, Chiayi County, Taiwan.

== History ==
The Peitian Temple was established in 1682 and is responsible for the development of Puzi, which grew up around it.

== Architecture ==
The temple faces south.

== Services ==
The Peitian Temple is a center of Mazu worship and pilgrimage on Taiwan. Veneration is also paid to her guardians Qianliyan ("Thousand-mile Eye"), Shunfeng'er ("Wind-following Ear"), and Grampa Tiger (虎爺, Hǔyé).

== See also ==
- Qianliyan & Shunfeng'er
- Fengtian Temple
- Gangkou Temple
- List of Mazu temples around the world
- List of temples in Taiwan
- Religion in Taiwan
