= Baozang Temple =

Chinese temple in Fenyuan, Changhua County, Taiwan

- 寶藏寺
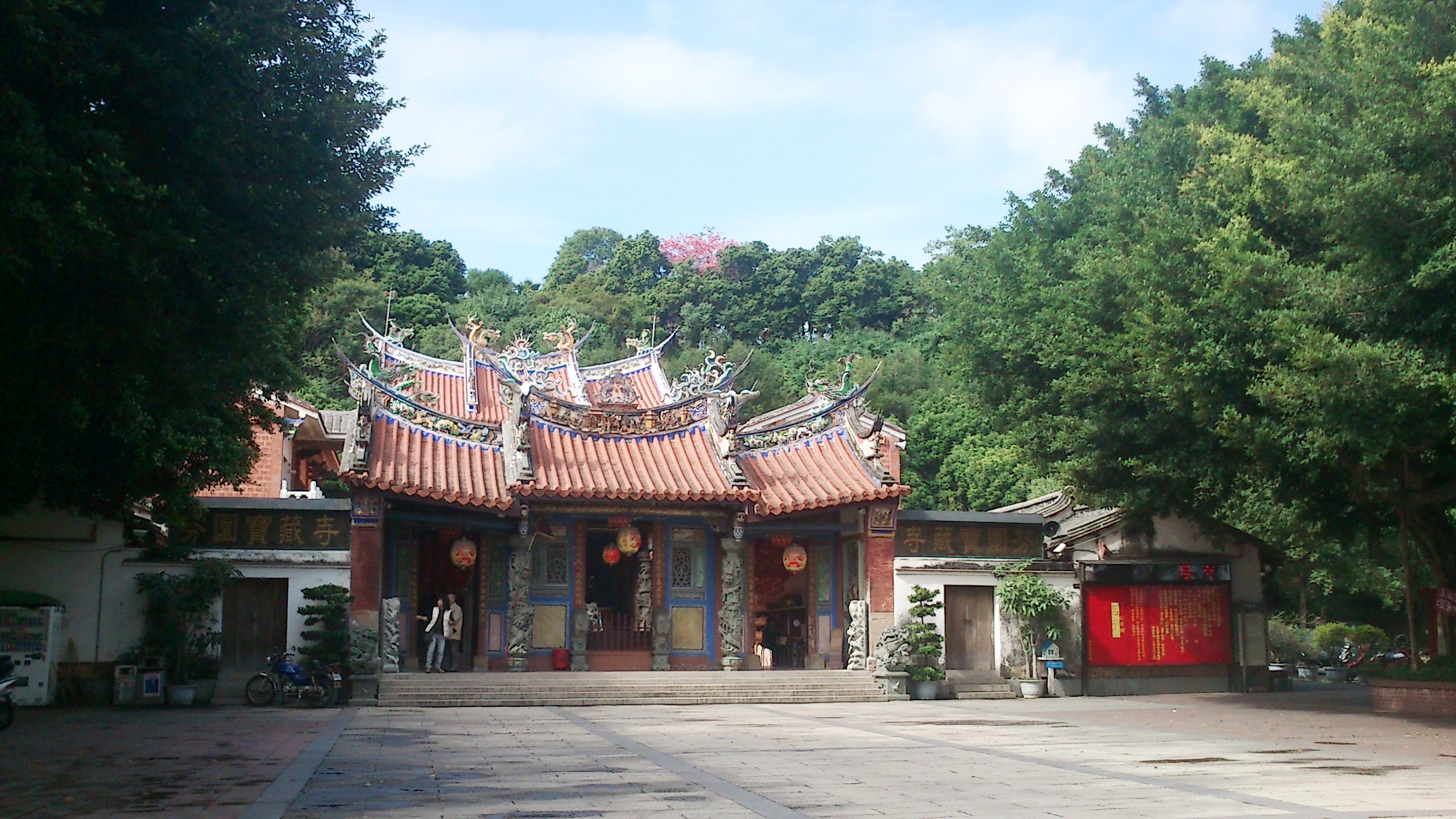

- Location within Changhua County

Religion
- Affiliation: Buddhism

Location
- Location: Fenyuan, Changhua County, Taiwan
- Coordinates: 24°00′07.8″N 120°37′40.7″E

Architecture
- Type: temple
- Style: Chinese
- Established: 1672

The Baozang Temple (traditional Chinese: 寶藏寺; simplified Chinese: 宝藏寺; pinyin: Bǎozàng Sì) is a Guanyin Temple in Fenyuan Township, Changhua County, Taiwan.

== History ==
The temple was originally built in 1672, during the Qing Dynasty rule. It was then rebuilt in 1971. The temple is designated as a third grade historic building. In 1995, public toilet and parking lot was built in front of the temple, enabling more visitors to visit the temple.

== Architecture ==
The temple presents refined sculptures and traditional Chinese architecture style. The building was built in a tri-hall dual side-wings structure. It displays several historic objects and almost 100 statues of gods.

== Transportation ==
The temple is accessible by bus from Changhua Station of Taiwan Railway.

== See also ==
- Hushan Temple
- Kaihua Temple
- Lukang Longshan Temple
- List of temples in Taiwan
- List of tourist attractions in Taiwan
