= Feng-Kuei Chen =

Taiwanese opera actress

Feng-Kuei Chen (November 10, 1950 —), whose stage name is Xiaomi, is a Taiwanese opera actress. She has been recognized as a "Living National Treasure" by the Ministry of Culture. She won the Best Performer Award at The 27th Golden Melody Awards For Traditional Arts and Music, the Best Performer Award at The 33rd Golden Melody Awards For Traditional Arts and Music, and the "Global Chinese Culture & Arts Award." She has been described as an "ever-changing genius."

== Life Story ==
Her family is from Huwei, Yunlin, and she was born in Lucao, Chiayi in 1950. Although her family ran a Taiwanese opera troupe, she did not learn Taiwanese opera when she was young. At the age of 13, she entered the Yixia Song and Dance Troupe. The host casually mentioned her stage name, "Xiaomi," when she sang on stage in place of someone else for the first time. Under the tutelage of choreographer Yueh-Hsia Wang, Xiaomi learned ballet, jazz, Japanese singing, folk songs, Taiwanese old songs, Taiwanese opera, and other traditional and modern tunes and dances. She was considered one of the best female performers of Yixia. Her performances could be seen in various places in Hong Kong, Singapore, and other countries.

The Yixia Song and Dance Troupe disbanded at the end of 1983. In 1985, Xiaomi joined the Lihua Yang Taiwanese Opera Troupe and shifted to Taiwanese opera on television. She successively performed with Li-Hua Yang, Hsiang-Lien Huang, Ching Yeh, and others. Since the 1990s, she has participated in stage Taiwanese opera performances with the Heluo Taiwanese Opera Troupe and the Huang Xianglian Opera Company. Her first play was Heluo's Chu Pang Chi.

In 1997, Mei-Yun Tang left the Heluo Taiwanese Opera Troupe and established the Tang Mei Yun Taiwanese Opera Company. Xiaomi also participated in this troupe.

In 2003, she was invited to serve as an instructor at the National Taiwan College of Performing Arts.
