= Lutsao Refuse Incineration Plant =

Incinerator in Lucao, Chiayi County, Taiwan

Lutsao Refuse Incineration Plant 鹿草垃圾焚化廠
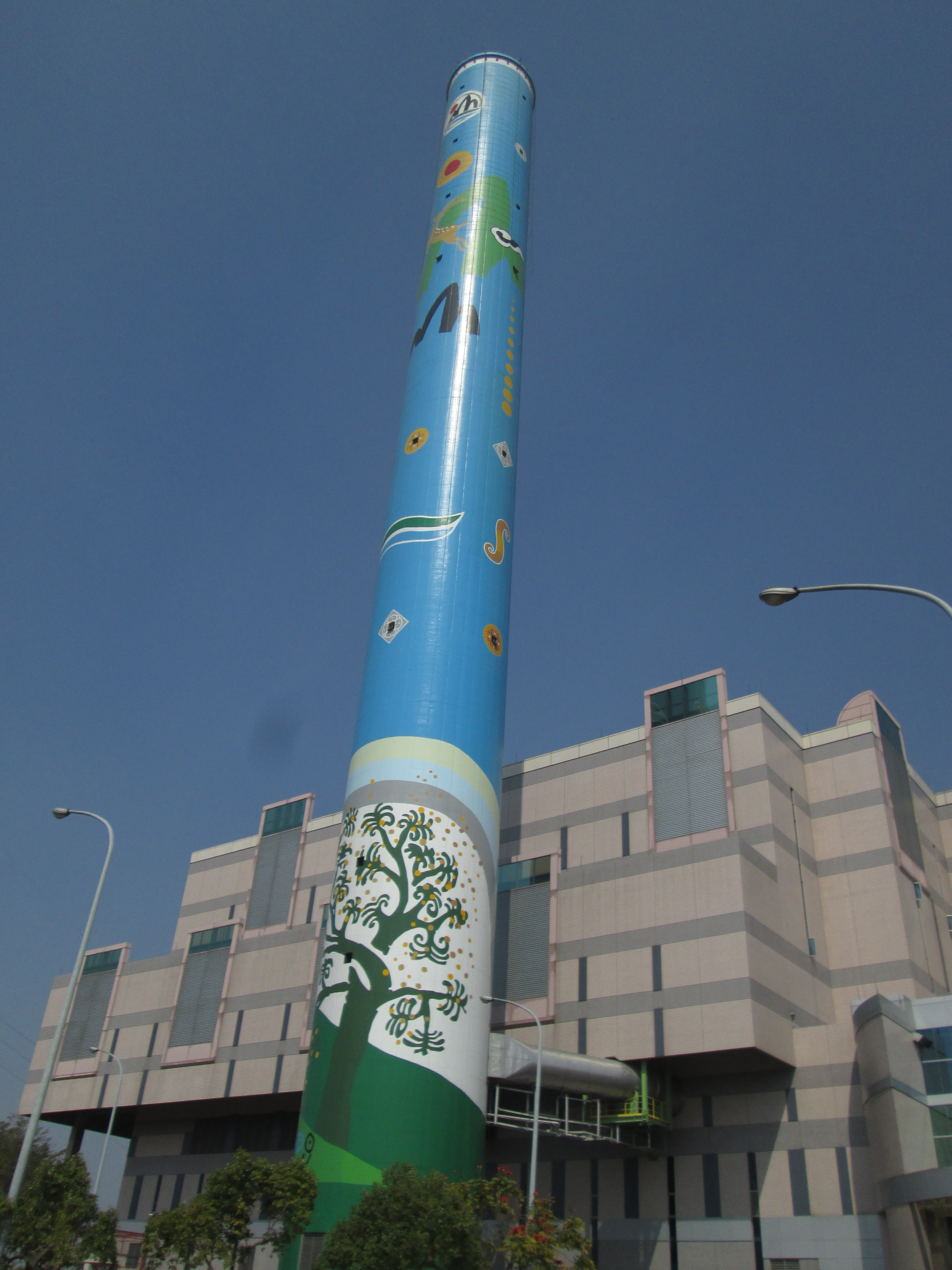
- Built: 30 November 1990
- Location: Lucao, Chiayi County, Taiwan
- Coordinates: 23°26′57.1″N 120°16′49.3″E
- Industry: waste management
- Style: incinerator
- Area: 4.5 ha (11 acres)

The Lutsao Refuse Incineration Plant (traditional Chinese: 鹿草垃圾焚化廠; simplified Chinese: 鹿草垃圾焚化厂; pinyin: Lùcǎo Lèsè Fénhuà Chǎng) is an incinerator in Lucao Township, Chiayi County, Taiwan.

== History ==
The construction of the plant started on 1 September 1987 and completed on 30 November 1990. It began its commercial operation on 1 December 2001.

== Architecture ==
The plant spans over an area of 4.5 hectares over a 10-hectare plot of land. Around 0.5 hectare of the land is used as a farm.

== Technical details ==
The plant is managed by Onyx Ta-Ho Environmental Services Co., Ltd. It has a capacity of treating 900 tons of garbage per day from its two boilers. It also has a power generating unit with an installed capacity of 28 MW. As of 2020, it received a total of 26,070 tons of garbage annually and incinerated 25,420 tons of them. The chimney has a height of 120 metres .

== See also ==
- Air pollution in Taiwan
