= Alice's Garden =

Garden in Fenyuan, Changhua County, Taiwan

- 就是愛荔枝樂園
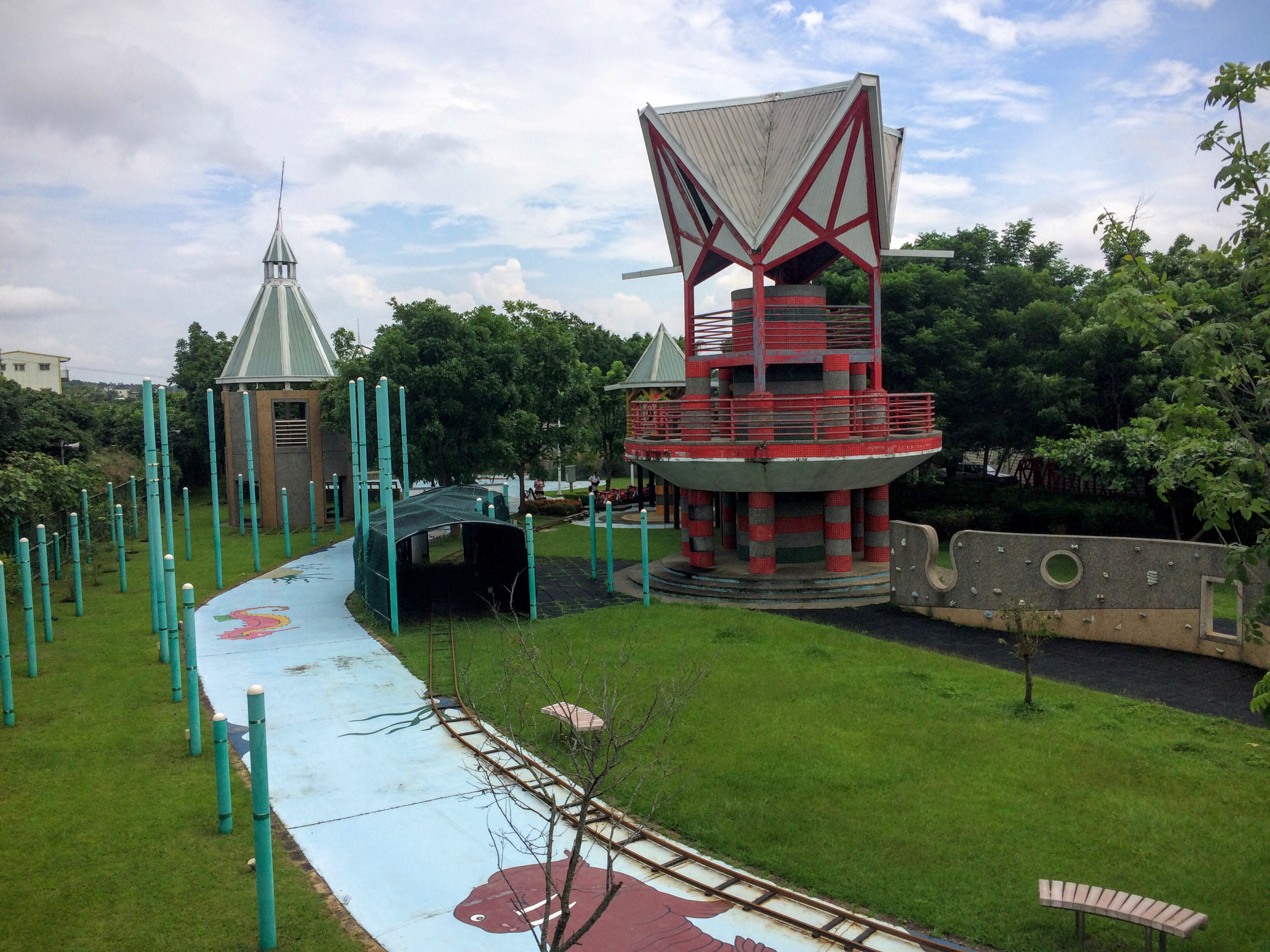
- Interactive map of Alice's Garden
- Type: garden
- Location: Fenyuan, Changhua County, Taiwan
- Coordinates: 24°00′7.3″N 120°37′32.8″E
- Website: Official website (in Chinese)

The Alice's Garden (traditional Chinese: 就是愛荔枝樂園; simplified Chinese: 就是爱荔枝乐园; pinyin: Jiùshì Àilìzhī Lèyuán) is a garden in Fenyuan Township, Changhua County, Taiwan.

== Architecture ==
The garden has various themes, with Lychee as their main theme, the special farm produce of Fenyuan. There are 22 Lychee figurines installed around the garden. There are floral fragrance, hearts and arrows, Alice's wonderland, smile of princess, laughter machine, Lychee baby, dream station etc. The garden also features a restaurant and Lychee queen gift shop.

== See also ==
- List of tourist attractions in Taiwan
