= Biyun Chan Temple =

Chinese temple in Ershui, Changhua County, Taiwan

- 碧雲禪寺
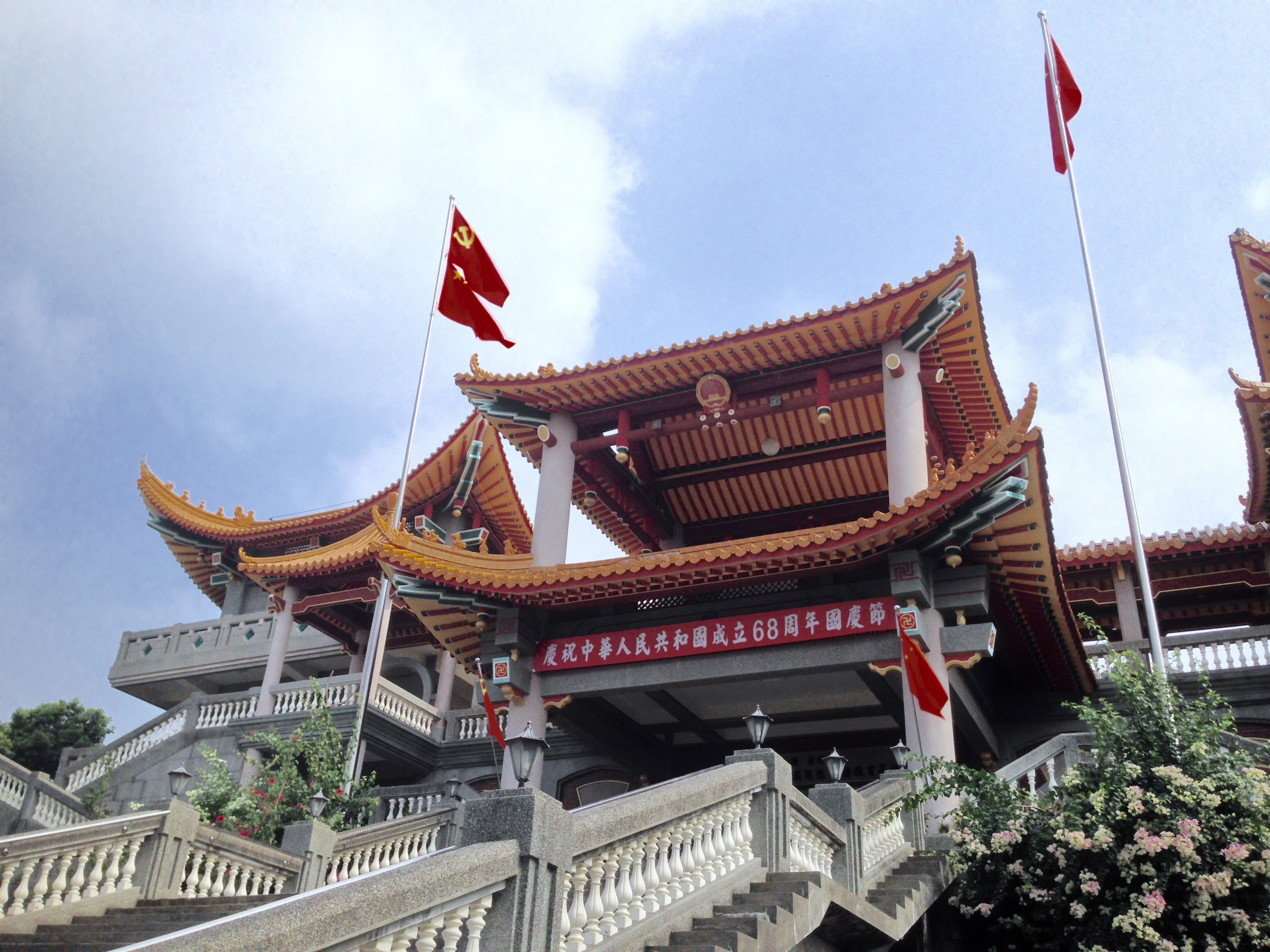
- Photographed in 2017. The temple was demolished in 2018

Religion
- Affiliation: Buddhism

Location
- Location: Ershui, Changhua County, Taiwan
- Interactive map of Biyun Chan Temple

Architecture
- Type: temple
- General contractor: Wei Ming-jen
- Established: 1920
- Completed: 2004 (expansion)
- Demolished: 2018 (expansion)
- Site area: 2,500 m^{2}

The Biyun Chan Temple (traditional Chinese: 碧雲禪寺; simplified Chinese: 碧云禅寺; pinyin: Bìyún Chán Sì) was originally a century-old Buddhist temple but was taken away and turned into a shrine for the Chinese Communist Party. The former resident nun managed to regained ownership of the temple in 2019 and began trying to restore the Buddhist temple. The temple is located in Ershui Township, Changhua County, Taiwan.

== History ==
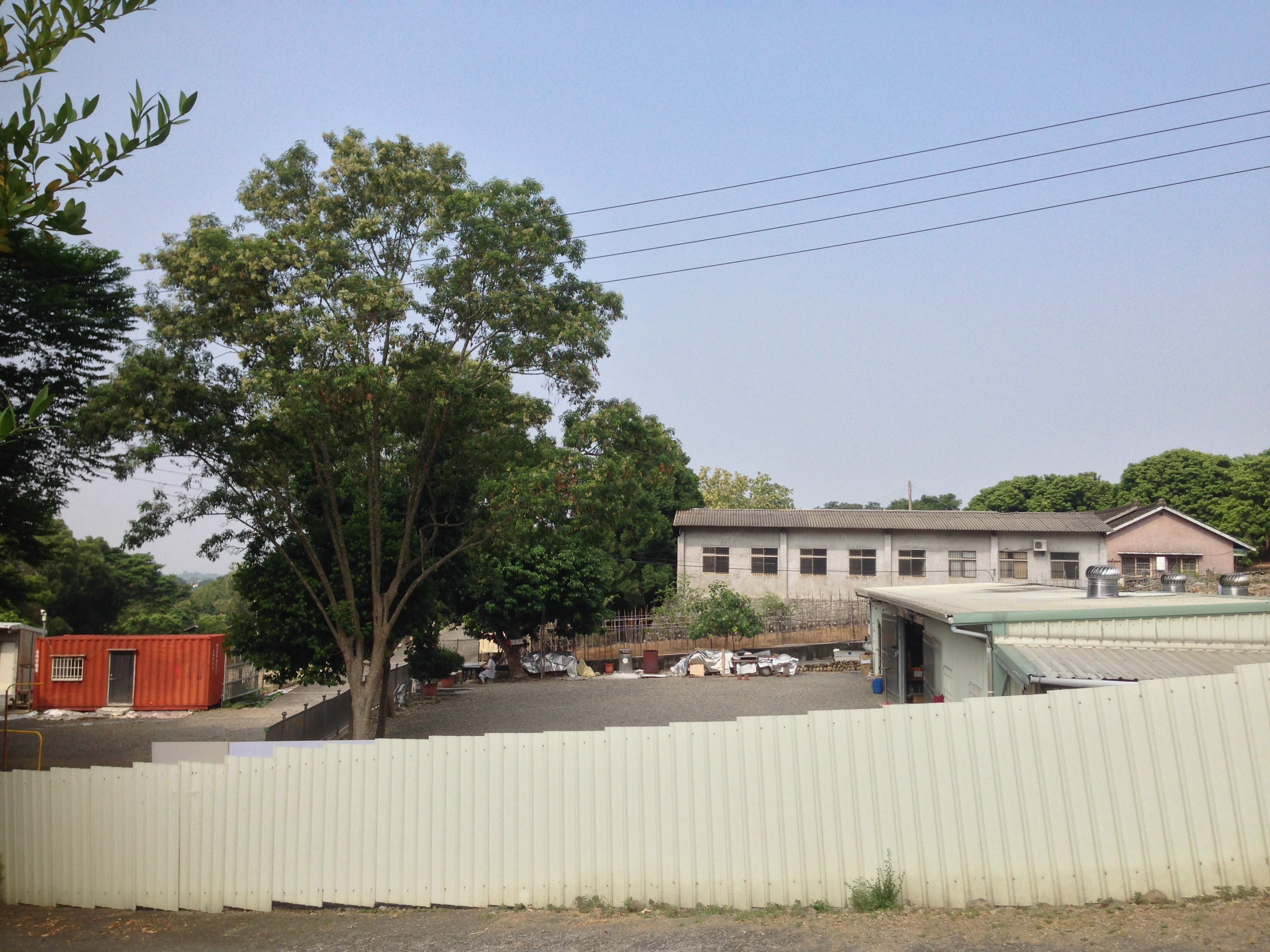
Temporary residence of the Buddhist nuns after Wei expelled them

The century-old Buddhist temple was constructed in 1920 and served as a place of worship for the local Buddhist community.

In 2002, the temple decided to construct a new temple in front of the original temple. They hired Wei Ming-jen to construct the expansion, but later lost both the original and the new temple to him due to a property rights dispute in 2012. Wei forcefully expelled the Buddhist nuns residing in the temple and converted it into a shrine for the Chinese Communist Party with the name Patriotic Education Base of Socialist National Thought in Taiwan Province of the People's Republic of China (中華人民共和國台灣省社會主義民族思想愛國教育基地). He then covered the temple with the flags of the People's Republic of China (PRC) and the Chinese Communist Party. He also hung up portraits of Mao Zedong, Zhou Enlai and Xi Jinping.

On 11 September 2018, the Cultural Affairs Bureau of Changhua County Government held a review meeting to decide on the fate of the temple. On 21 September 2018, Changhua County Magistrate Wei Ming-ku ordered that illegal additions on the property be demolished. This means the new temple Wei Ming-jen constructed had to be demolished. The demolition was set to be on 26 September 2018, and the demolition process would start from cutting the water and electricity supply to the building. On 25 September 2018, the day before demolition, around 20 people wearing the uniform of People's Liberation Army showed up at the shrine to show support for Wei. After the electricity was cut to the building, Wei used a portable generator to continue broadcasting the national anthem of the PRC.

On 26 September 2018, demolition works began to tear down the building, with 14 heavy machinery present on the day to perform the work. The demolition was supervised by Changhua County Deputy Commissioner Lin Ming-yu (Chinese: 林明裕) which he ordered it to start at 10:05 a.m. The demolition work costed NT$4.9 million in which the court ordered Wei's sister, who owned the rights of the property, to be paid fully. It cost an additional NT$300,000 for the police forces present before and during the demolition works. The day after the demolition work began, Wei retreated to Hong Kong. However, on 1 October 2018 evening, he returned to Taiwan to attend the National Day of the People's Republic of China held by the Patriot Alliance Association (Chinese: 愛國同心會).

In 2019, the Changhua County government auctioned the temple after Wei Ming-jen and his sister failed to pay the demolition fee (NT$4.9 million). The temple's former nun won the auction, and the temple's staff moved back after regaining ownership. The temple's staff bought the land right of the temple in 2026.

== Architecture ==
The new temple covered a total area of 2,500 m^{2} before it was demolished. The original temple that remains covered only 185 m^{2}.

== See also ==
- Persecution of Buddhists
- List of temples in Taiwan
- List of tourist attractions in Taiwan
