= Hushan Temple =

Temple in Huatan, Changhua County, Taiwan

- 虎山巖
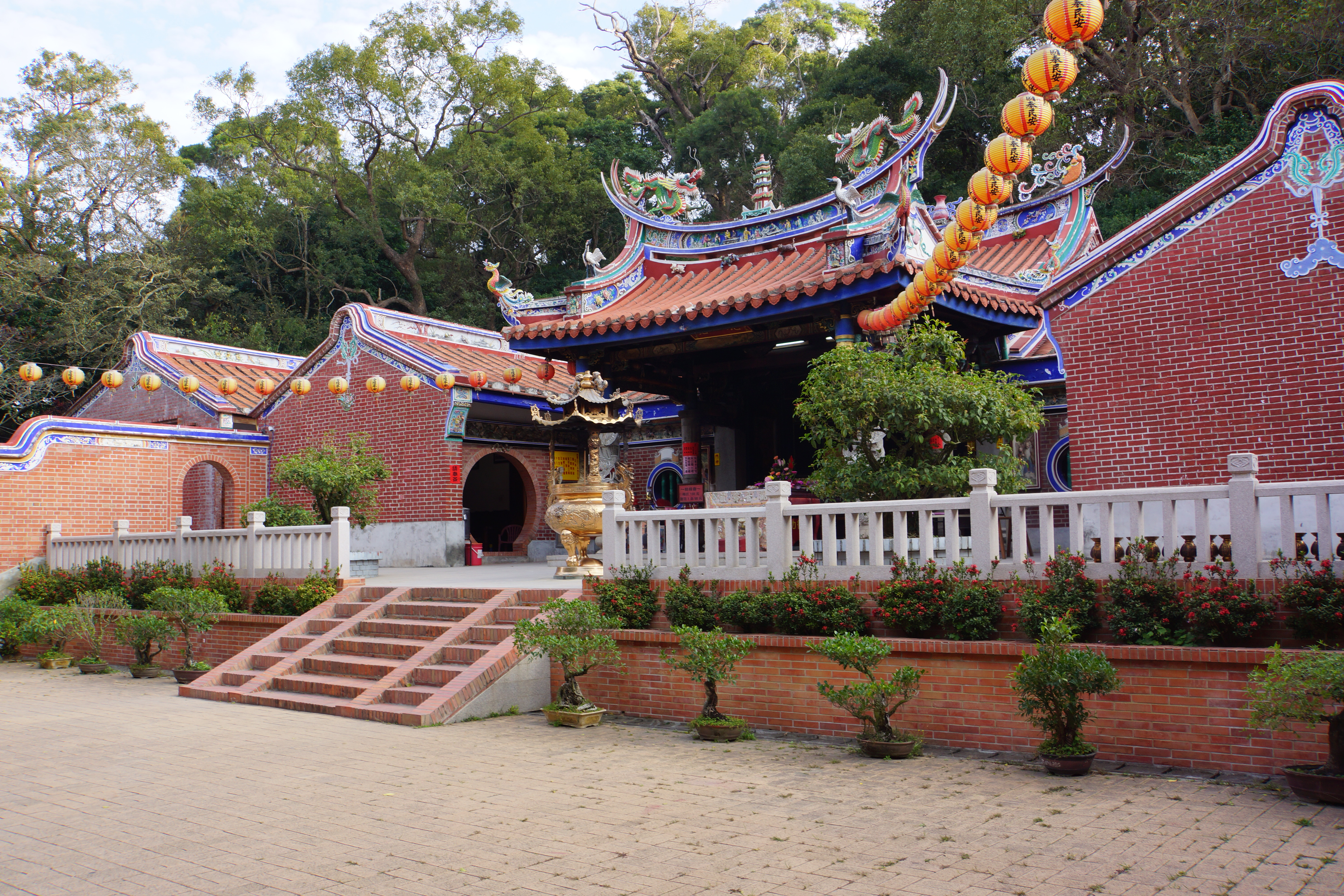

- Location within Changhua County

Location
- Location: Huatan, Changhua County, Taiwan
- Coordinates: 24°2′35.3″N 120°33′34.7″E

Architecture
- Type: temple
- Established: 1725

The Hushan Temple (traditional Chinese: 虎山巖; simplified Chinese: 虎山岩; pinyin: Hǔshān Yán) is a temple in Huatan Township, Changhua County, Taiwan. It enshrines Guanyin Bodhisattva.

== History ==
In 1725 during the Qianlong Emperor, the temple constructed. The temple was then built on the land of Lai Feng-kao.

== See also ==
- Buddhism in Taiwan
- Baozang Temple
- Kaihua Temple
- Lukang Longshan Temple
- List of temples in Taiwan
- List of tourist attractions in Taiwan
