= Jinde Temple, Wanhua =

Temple in Taipei, Taiwan

Jinde Temple
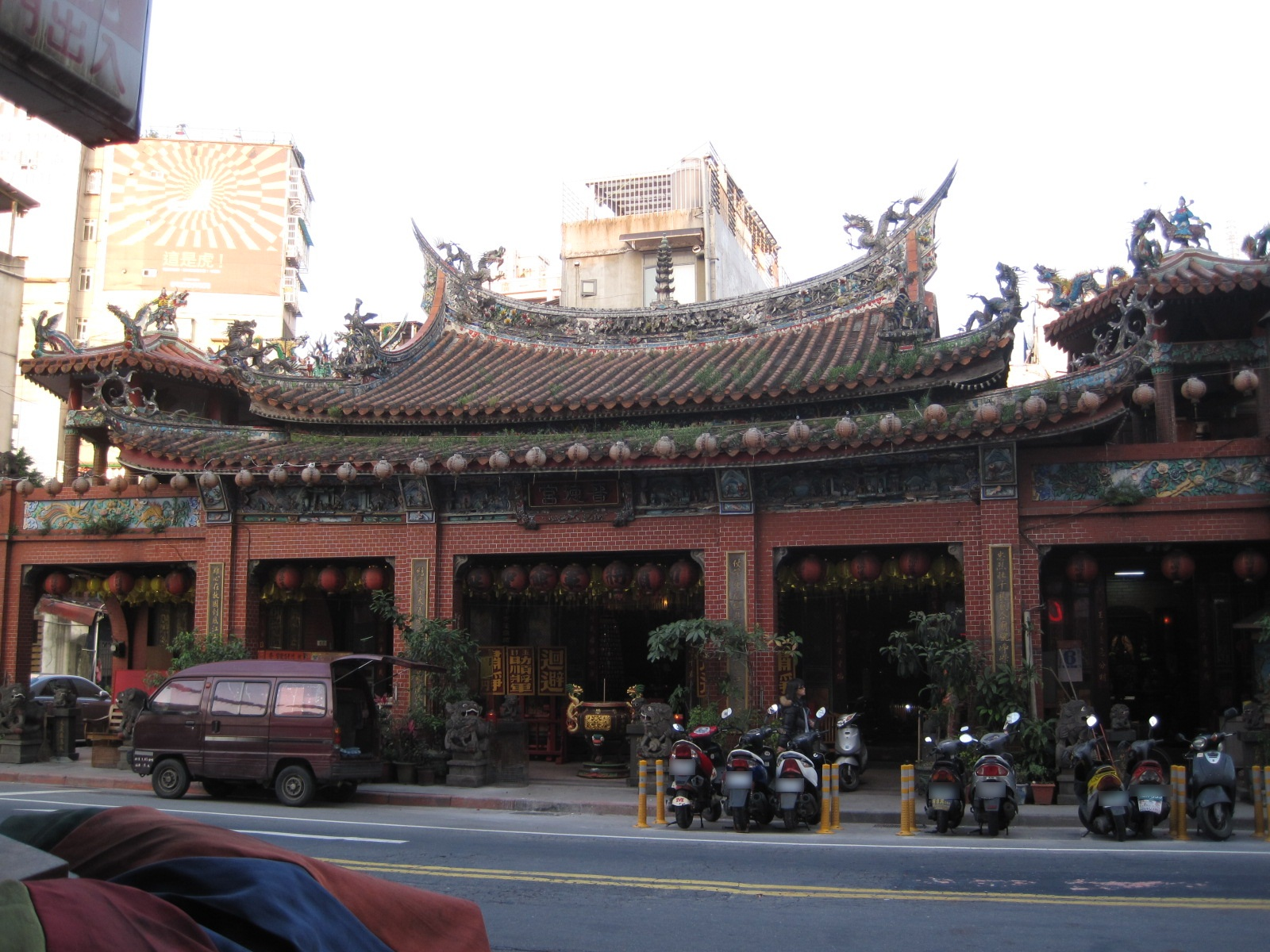
- The temple's exterior, 2011

Location
- Interactive map of Jinde Temple

Jinde Temple is located in Taipei's Wanhua District, Taiwan.

The place name is "Hegoutou" (the area around the back streets of Ximending), which are Hegoutoujiao, Zhuxiangweizhuang and Jimucuozai. Because it was close to the Tamsui River and connected by rivers and ditches at that time, it was located at a waterway transportation point.

It is also the place where Xu Haiqing, the underworld godfather and underworld arbiter, made his fortune at a young age. In addition, the temple's organizational form is a management committee system. There are also two temples in Tamsui District and Wugu District in New Taipei City that also worship General Zhushun.

== See also ==
- List of temples in Taiwan
