= Fenyuan =

Rural township in Changhua County, Taiwan

Coordinates: 24°00′55.6″N 120°37′38.7″E

Fenyuan Township 芬園鄉
- Rural township
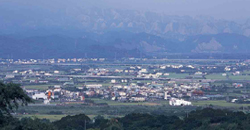

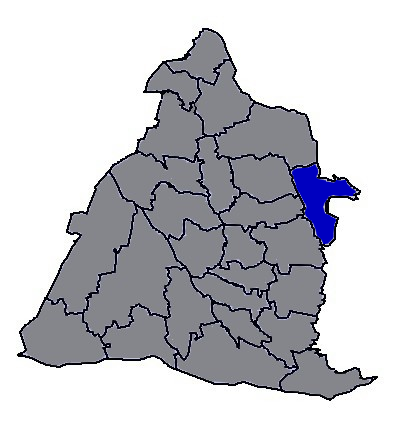
- Fengyuan Township in Changhua County
- Location: Changhua County, Taiwan

Area
  - Total: 38 km^{2} (15 sq mi)

Population (January 2023)
  - Total: 22,417
  - Density: 590/km^{2} (1,500/sq mi)

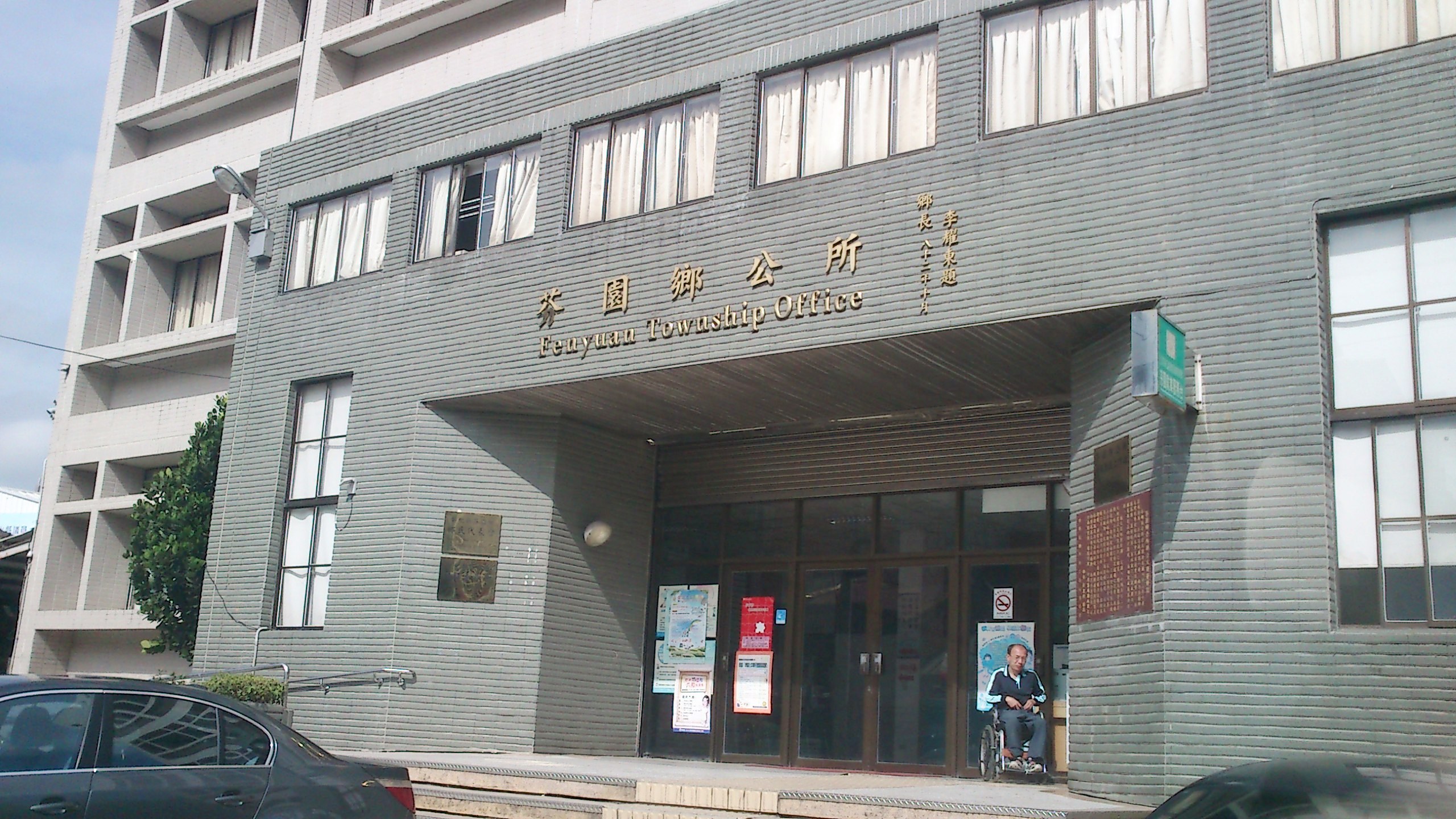
Fenyuan Township office

Fenyuan Township (Chinese: 芬園鄉; pinyin: Fēnyuán Xiāng) is a rural township in Changhua County, Taiwan.

== Geography ==
Fenyuan encompasses 38.08 square kilometres (14.70 sq mi) and a population of 22,417, including 11,777 males and 10,640 females as of January 2023.

== Administrative divisions ==
The township comprises 15 villages: Dapu, Dazhu, Fengkeng, Fenyuan, Jiapei, Jiaxing, Jinfen, Jiushe, Shekou, Tongan, Xianzhuang, Xitou, Zhonglun, Zhulin and Zunqi.

== Tourist attractions ==
- Alice's Garden
- Baozang Temple

== Notable natives ==
- Lin Shu-fen, member of 7th, 8th and 9th Legislative Yuan
