= Lucao, Chiayi =

Rural township in Chiayi County, Taiwan

Coordinates: 23.413333°N 120.309167°E

鹿草鄉
- Rural township
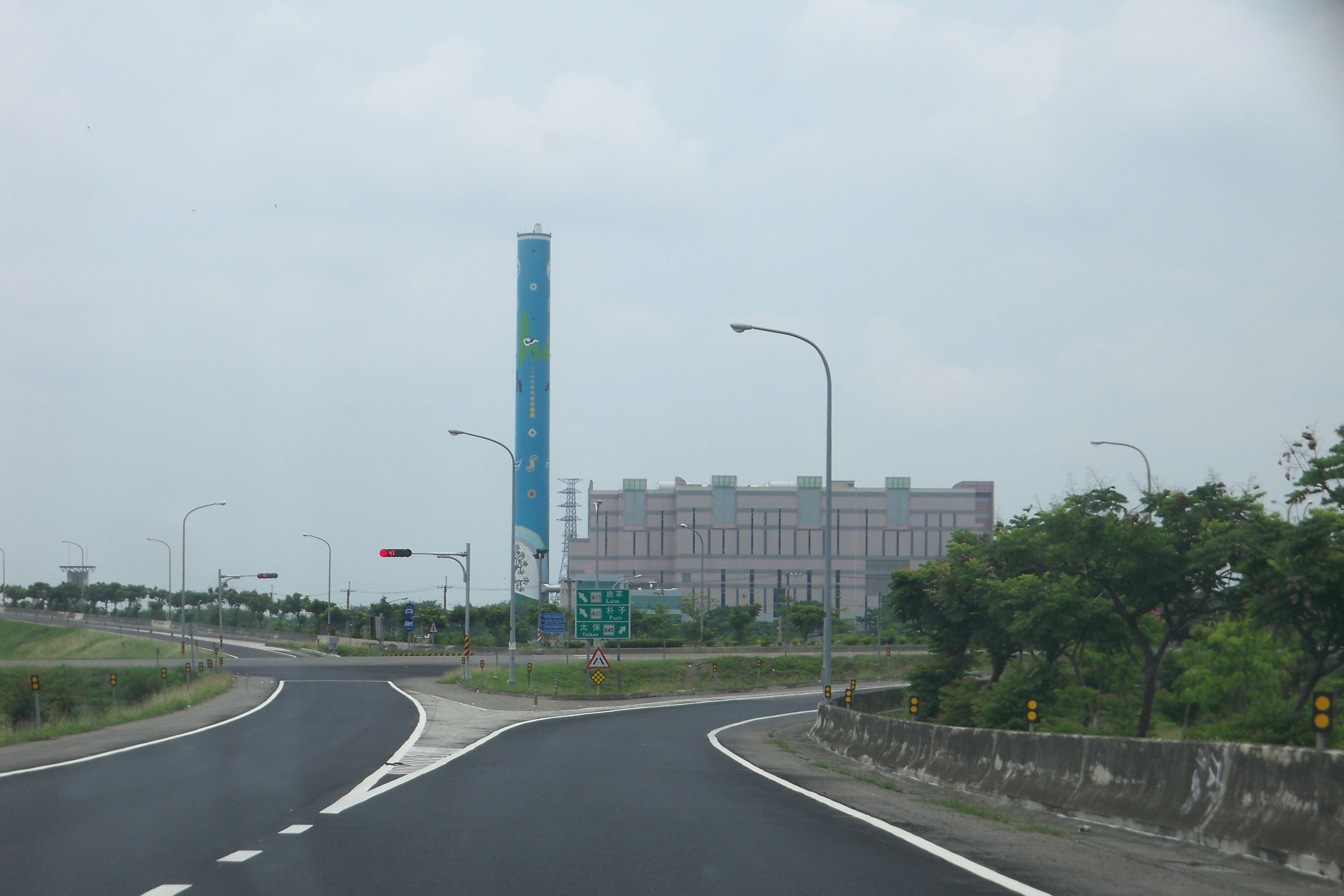

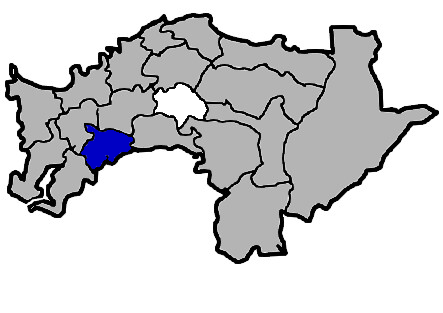
- Lucao Township in Chiayi County
- Location: Chiayi County, Taiwan

Area
  - Total: 54 km^{2} (21 sq mi)

Population (May 2022)
  - Total: 14,579
  - Density: 270/km^{2} (700/sq mi)

Lucao Township (Chinese: 鹿草鄉; pinyin: Lùcǎo Xiāng) is a rural township in Chiayi County, Taiwan.

== History ==
After the World War II in 1945, the Lucao Township Office was established on 18 January 1946.

== Geography ==
It has a population total of 14,579 and an area of 54.3151 km^{2}.

== Administrative divisions ==
Houliao, Lutung, Lucao, Xijing, Lichou, Zhongliao, Shijia, Xiatan, Guangtan, Bitan, Songzhu, Zhushan, Houku, Sanjiao and Xiama Village.

== Infrastructure ==
- Lutsao Refuse Incineration Plant

== Tourist attractions ==
- Yuanshan Temple
- Temple of a City Ruling Deity
- Lucao Yuanshan Palace
- Shan Chen Ancestral Hall South Zaijiao
- 11-Hole Water Door
- Home Town of Pencil Chen and Ming Chin Chen
- Houses of Soil

== Notable people ==
- Feng-Kuei Chen
