= Shunze Temple =

Taoist temple in Taiwan

Coordinates: 23°59′48″N 120°28′29″E

Puyan Shunze Temple
- 埔鹽順澤宮
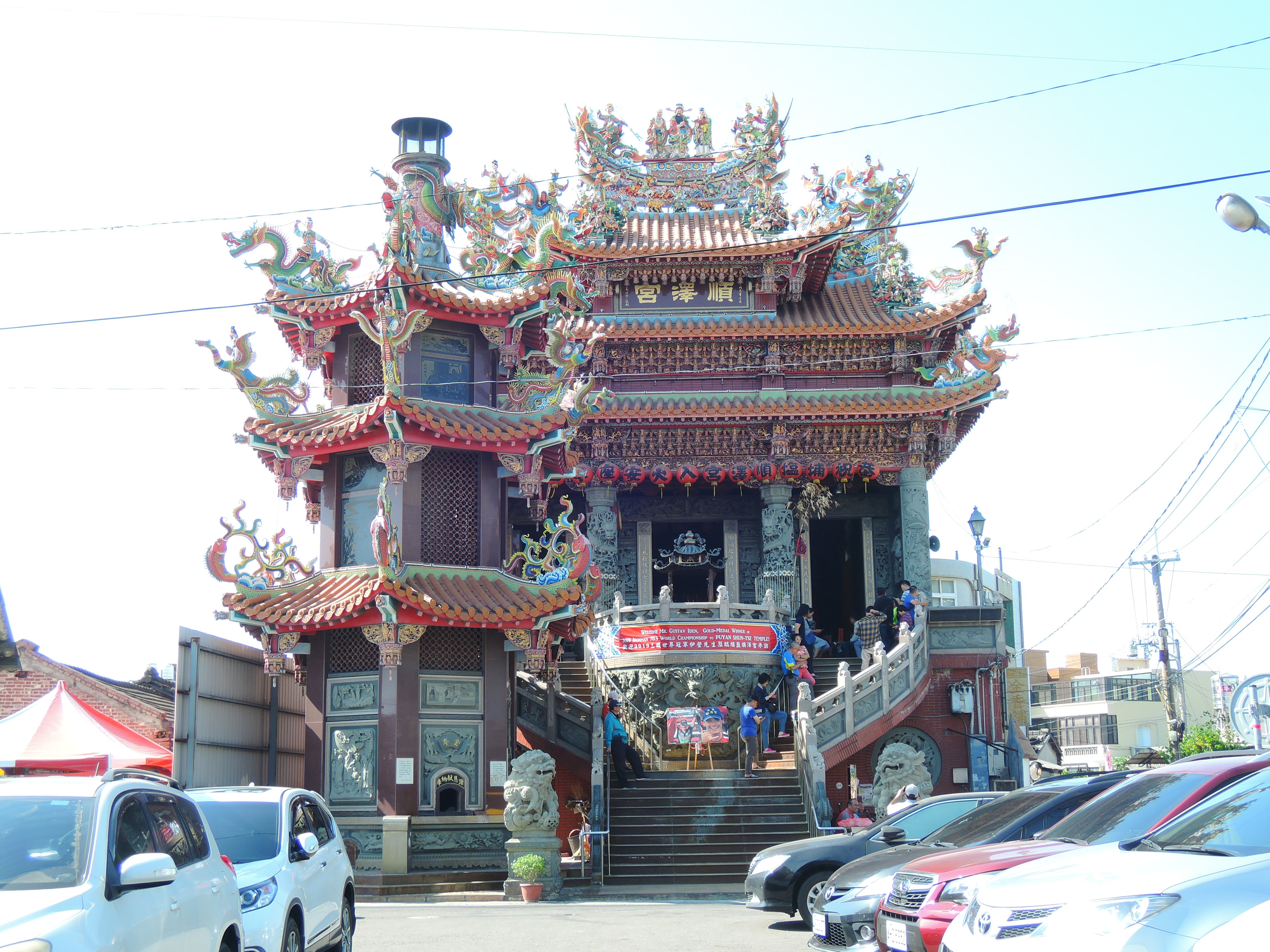

Religion
- Affiliation: Taoism

Location
- Location: No. 55 Zhongzheng Rd., Puyan Village, Puyan Township, Changhua County 51618 TAIWAN
- Interactive map of Puyan Shunze Temple

Architecture
- Founder: The Chen Family
- Established: About 1722 to 1735
- Completed: 1998

Website
- 順澤宮

Puyan Shunze Temple (Chinese: 埔鹽順澤宮; pinyin: Bù-yán Shùn-zé Gōng; Pe̍h-ōe-jī: Poo-iâm Sūn-ti̍k Kiong), is a temple in Puyan Township, Changhua County, Taiwan. It is dedicated to Xuanwu (Chinese: 玄天上帝; pinyin: Xuán tiān shàng dì; Pe̍h-ōe-jī: Siōng-tè-kong) and is the religious center in Puyan village of Puyan Township.

== Triathlete Hat Popularity ==
The temple became an "overnight sensation" and cult-popular in the sports world when triathlete and world Ironman champion Gustav Iden of Norway wore a baseball hat from the temple when he crossed the finish line to win the 2019 world Ironman championship in France. He found the hat by chance, lying on the street in Tokyo and wore it as a sign of luck which went viral after his win.

Iden went on to win every competition he wore the "lucky hat," winning 10 Ironman competition titles in a row wearing it. Iden's wins with the Shunze Temple hat have made the small temple popular amongst athletes and the public in general, with some athletes doing a pilgrimage of sorts to obtain the seemingly-lucky temple hat before competitions. The hat became such a popular symbol that the temple has made thousands of similar hats, spreading the lucky emblem, and the local Tawianese transit authority designed a transit pass after the hat.

He most recently wore the hat for his podium-finish of the World Ironman competition in Kona, Hawaii in October of 2026, where he finished 2nd following a 3-minute penalty (which many commentators speculate he would have won if not for the penalty).

== Gallery ==
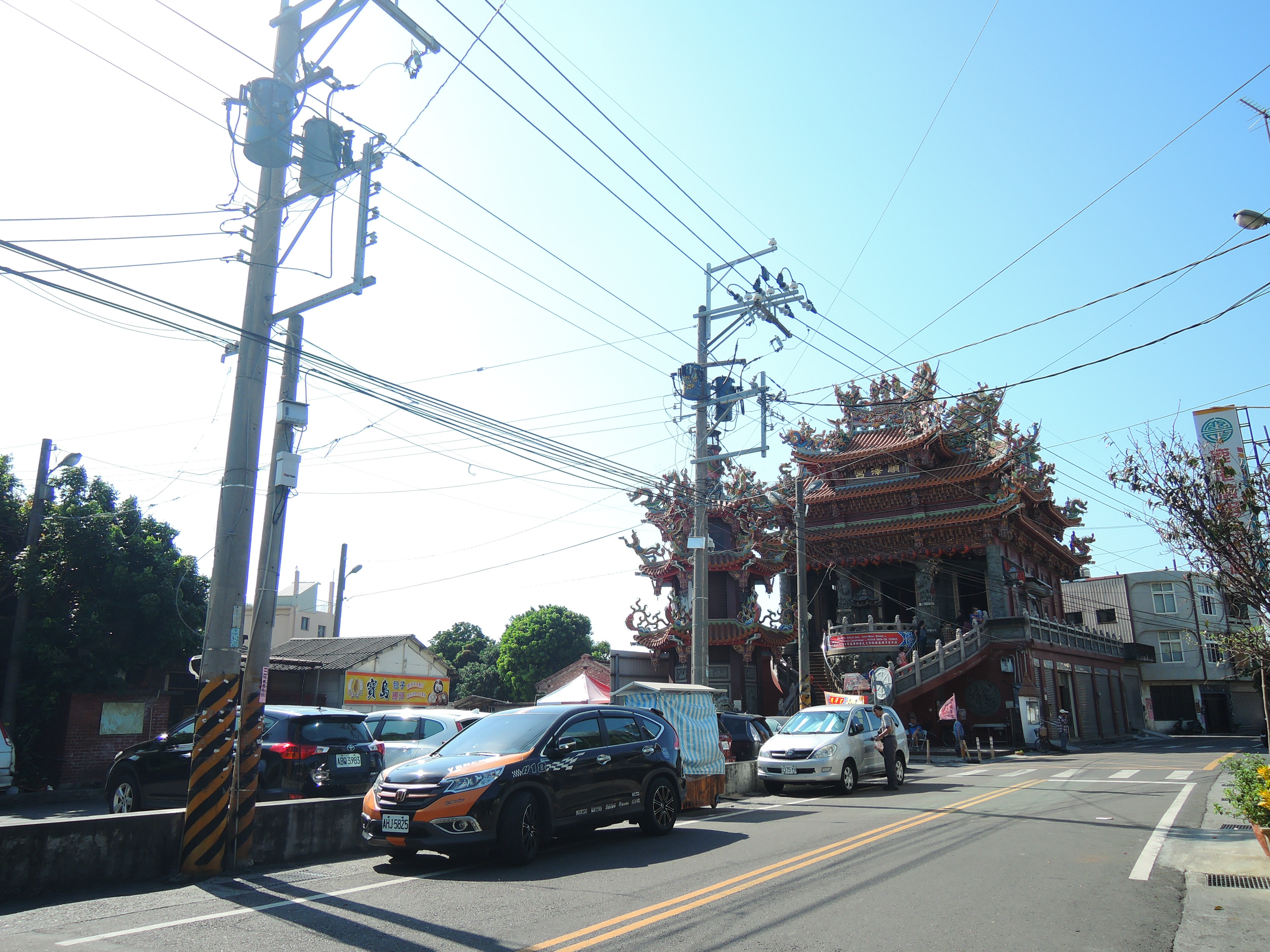
View of the temple

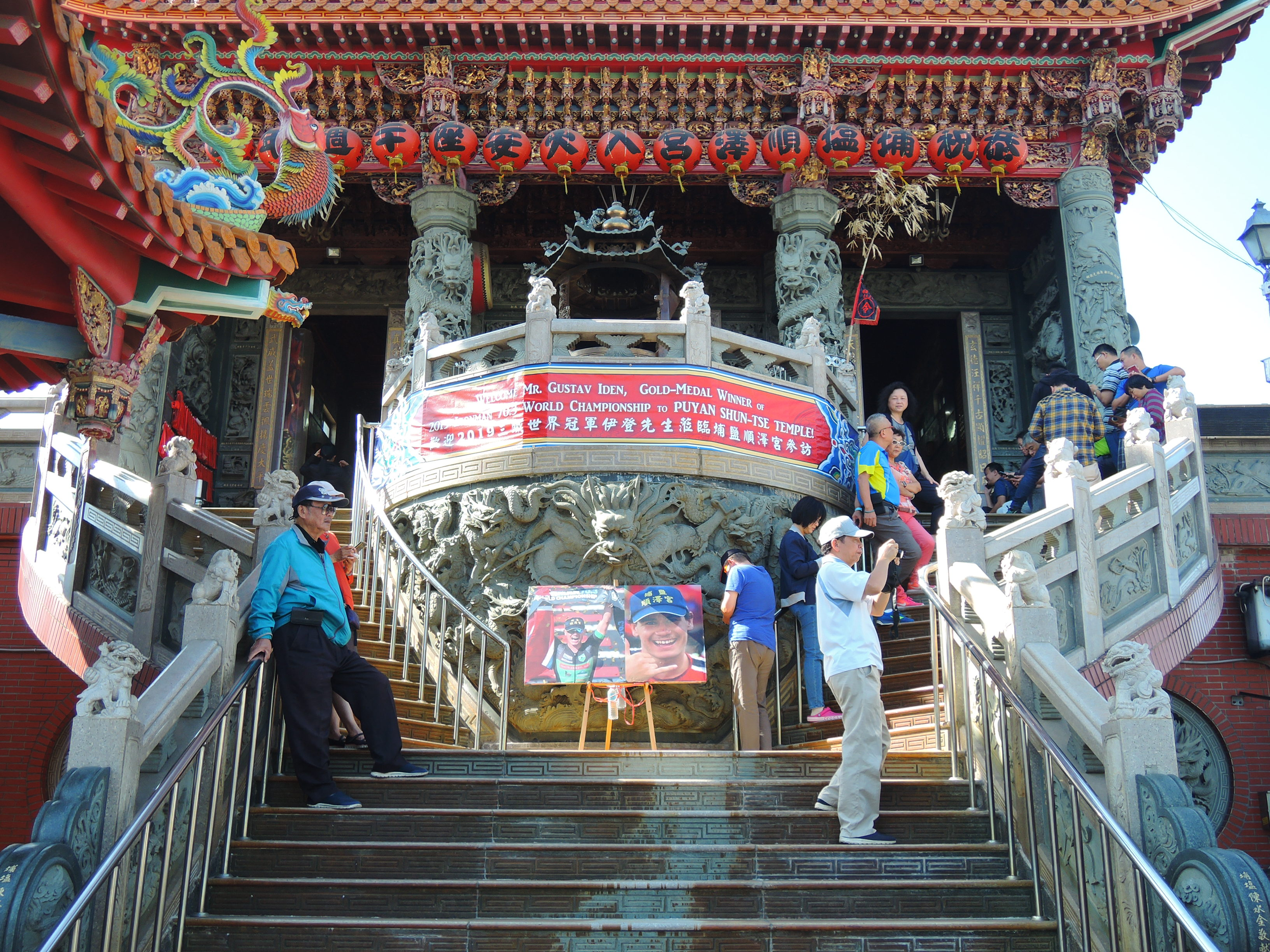
The entrance

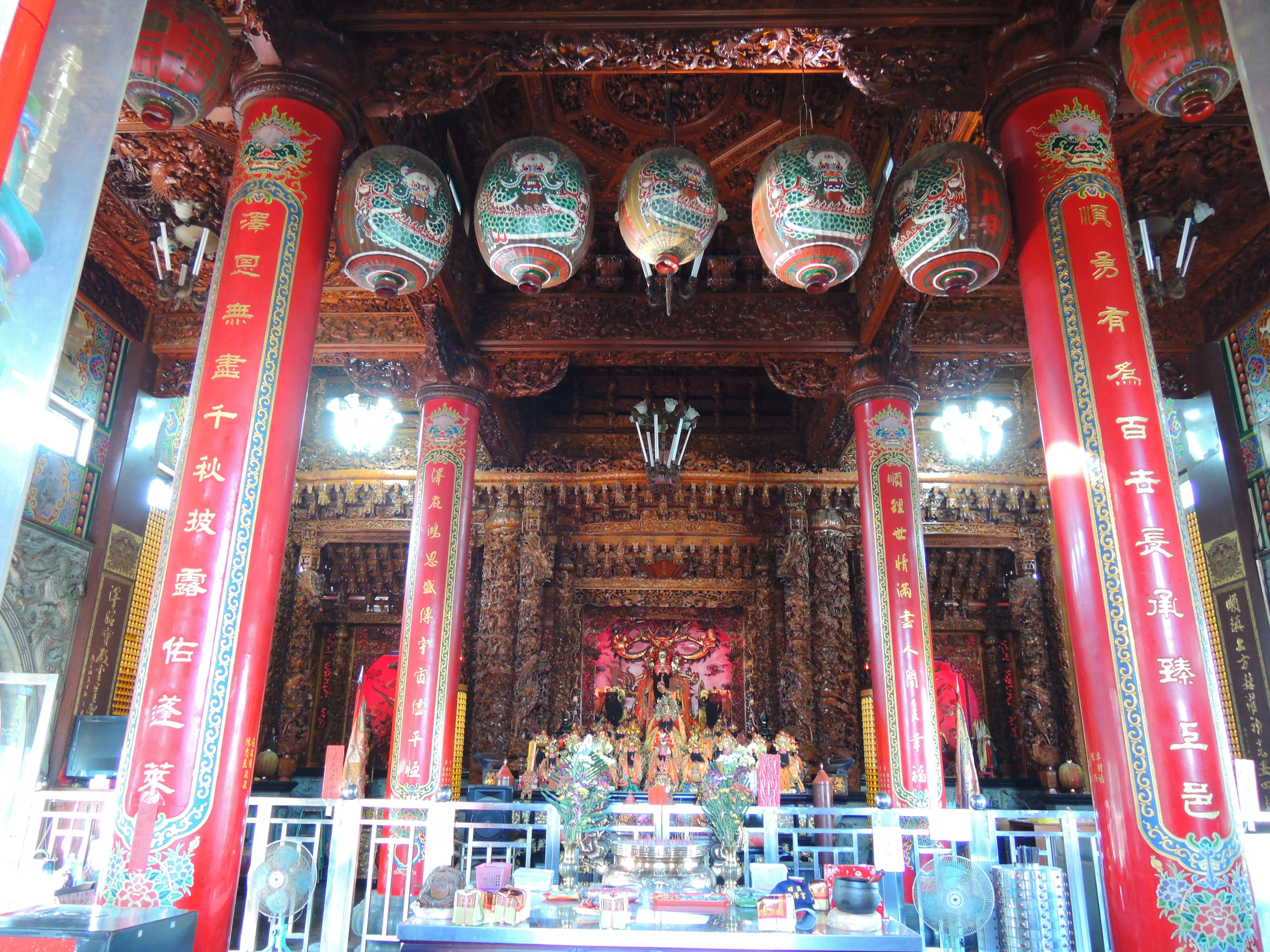
The hall

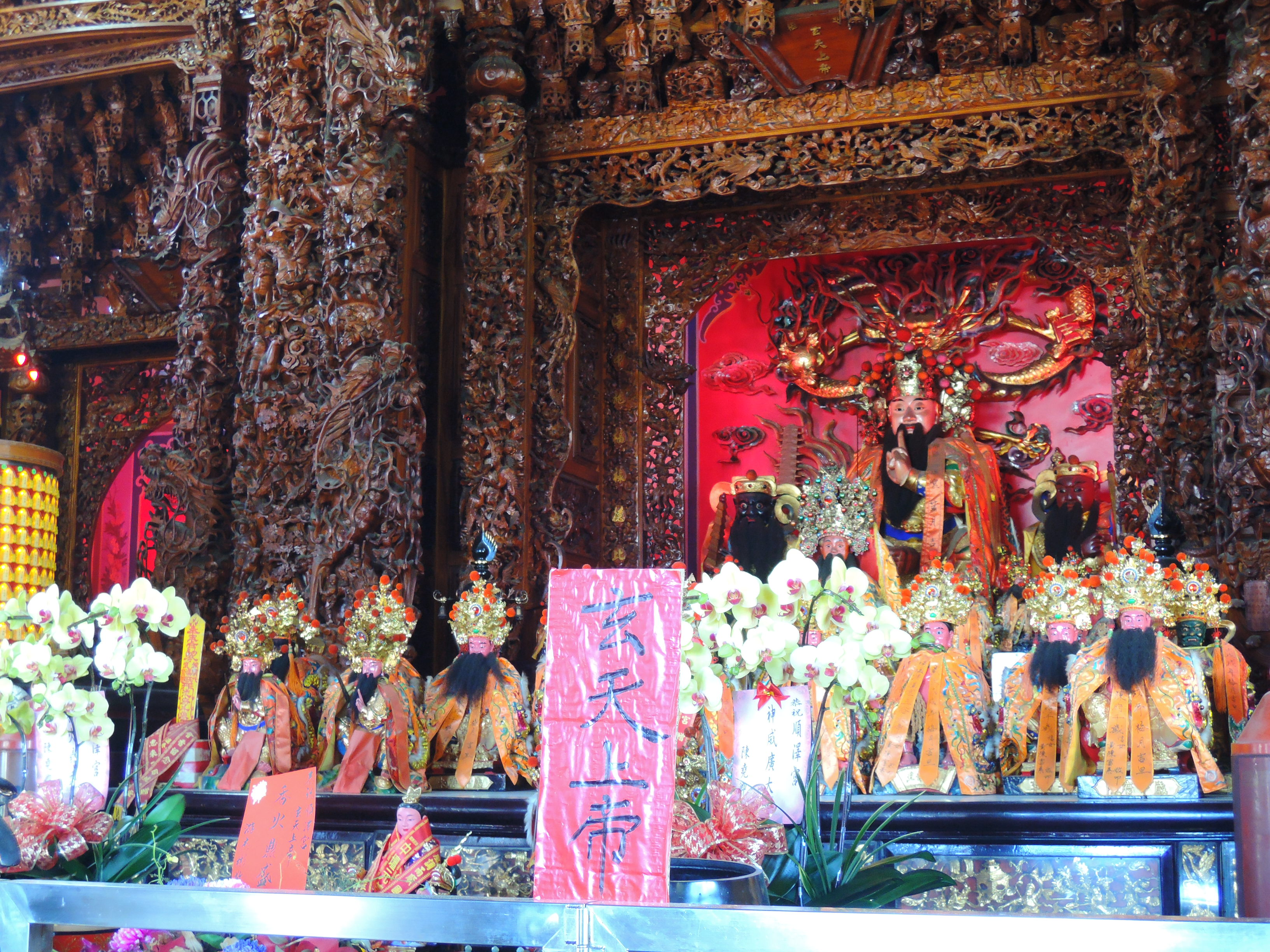
Statue of Xuanwu

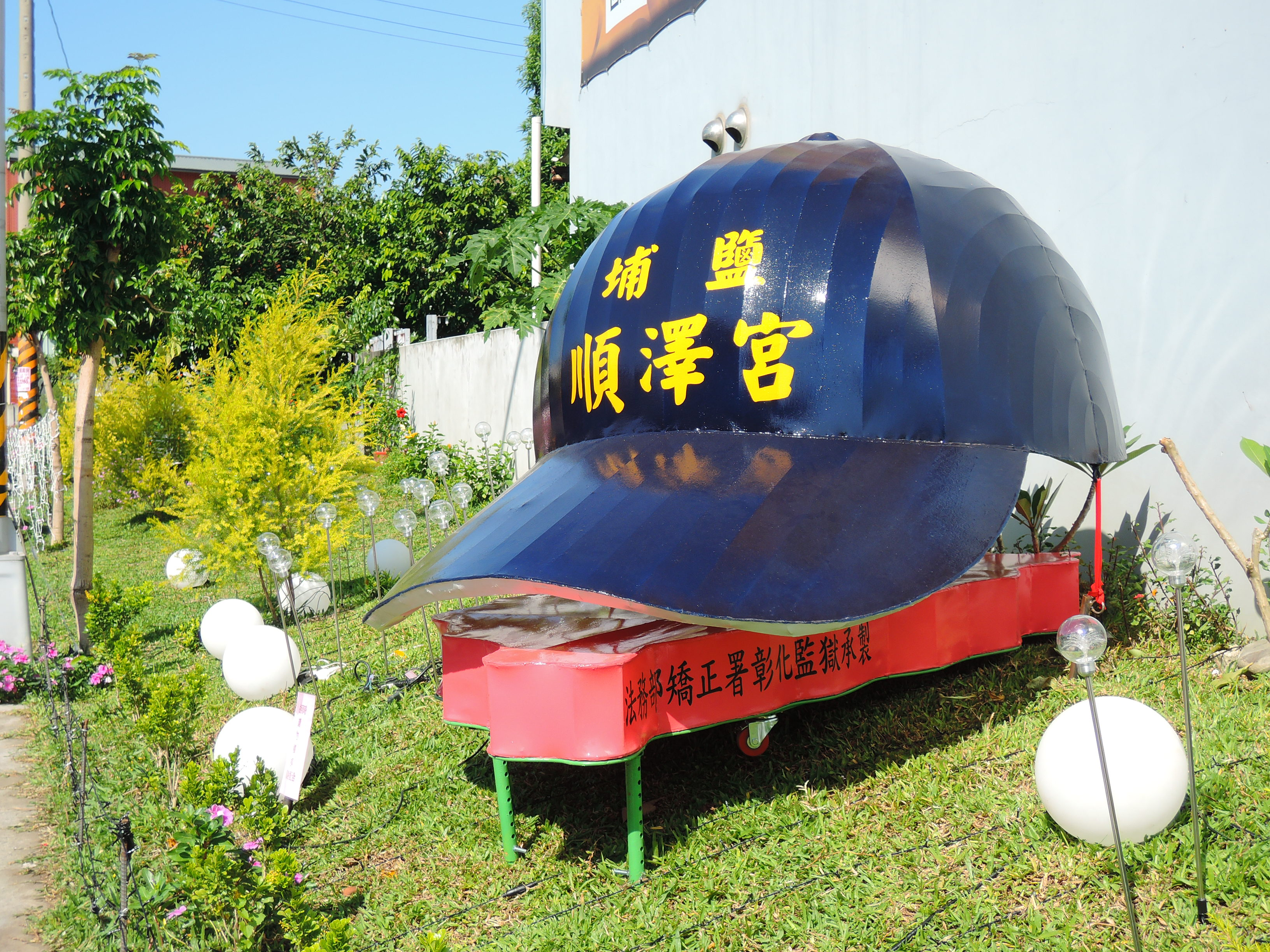
Cap with temple logo. Norwegian triathlete Gustav Iden wore this cap and won the 2019 Ironman 70.3 World Championship in Nice, France.
