= Shengang Fu'an Temple =

Temple in Changhua County, Taiwan

Fu'an Temple
- 福安宮
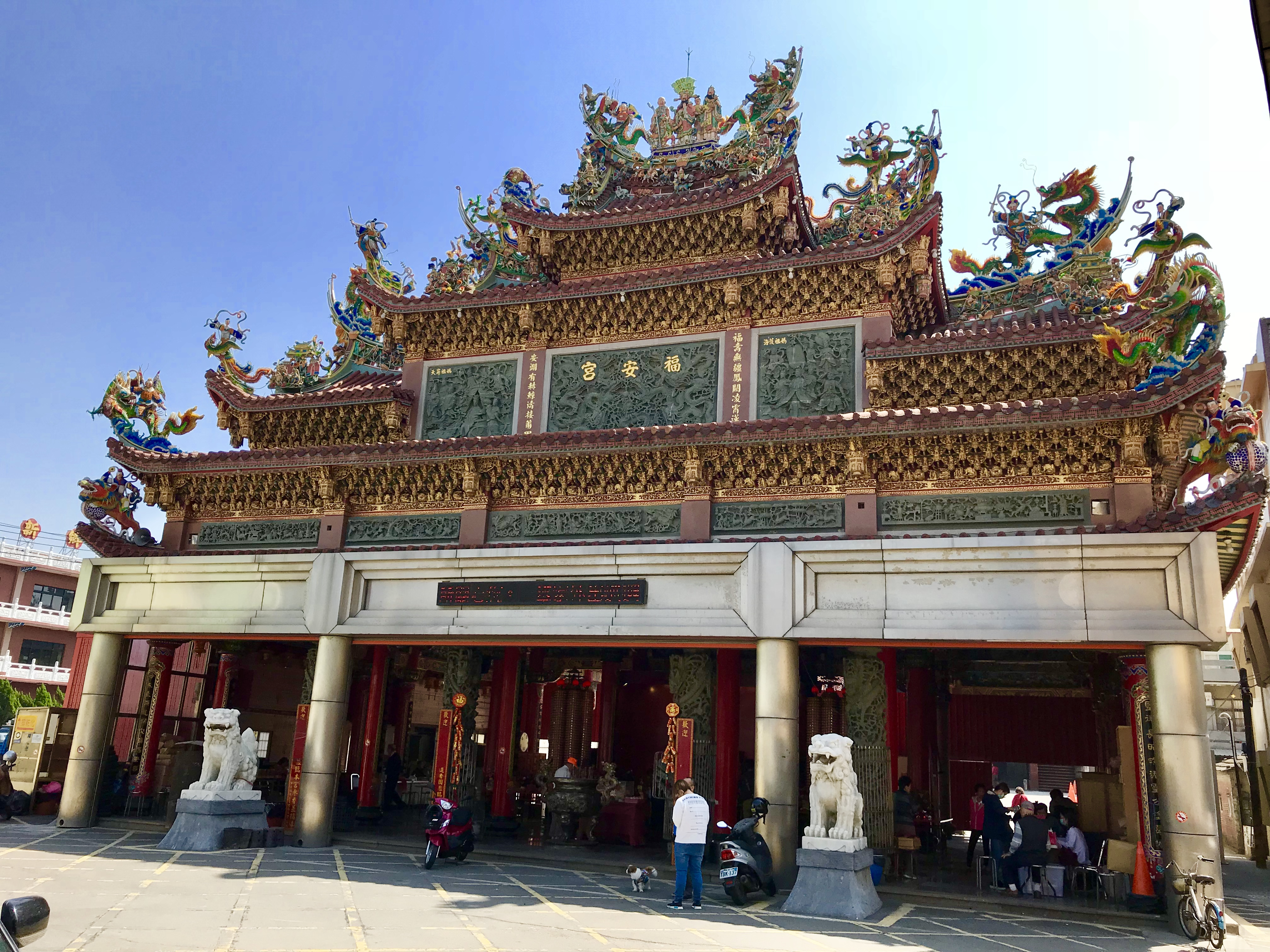
- Exterior of the temple in 2018

Religion
- Affiliation: Taoism
- Deity: Mazu

Location
- Location: Shengang, Changhua County
- Country: Taiwan
- Interactive map of Fu'an Temple
- Coordinates: 24.1625°N 120.4885°E

Architecture
- Completed: 1677
- Direction of façade: West

Shengang Fu'an Temple (Chinese: 伸港福安宮; pinyin: Shēngǎng Fú'ān Gōng) is a temple located in Shengang Township, Changhua County, Taiwan. The temple is dedicated to the sea goddess Mazu, who is the deified form of Lin Moniang.

In 2015, a large portion of the temple was destroyed in a fire. The temple is currently being reconstructed.

== History ==
Fu'an Temple's history traces back to its establishment in 1677 by Quanzhou settlers from mainland China. According to legend, after a fisherman picked up a piece of driftwood, Mazu appeared and instructed him to construct a temple, using the driftwood as material for the statue. During Japan's rule over Taiwan, the temple was completely rebuilt between 1917 and 1918. The temple was then expanded in 1971 and 1993, and a paifang in front of the temple was added in 1980.

On 16 May 2015 at around 11:00 PM, a fire broke out within Fu'an Temple and engulfed most of the temple. Two days later, temple officials found the remains of two wooden Mazu statues inside the temple: the Zhendian Mazu statue (鎮殿媽祖) was charred beyond recognition, and the Kaiji Mazu statue (開基媽祖) was completely burned into ash. The only surviving Mazu statue was not inside the temple because it was to be used in a festival the following week; after the fire, it was immediately brought back and placed in the remains of the temple. A groundbreaking ceremony for the temple's reconstruction was held on 4 April 2018, three years after the fire due to land use issues.

== Traditions ==
As the primary Mazu temple in the area, the temple hosts an event known as "gifting the censer" (送大爐). Each year, Fu'an Temple passes an incense censer to one of the eighteen villages in Shengang and Hemei. The censer is placed in the village's main temple, and that temple hosts a celebration for all the villages. The village is chosen through poe divination. On 12 May 2020, this event was recognized by the Changhua County Government as a protected cultural tradition.
