= Shengang, Changhua =

Rural township in Changhua County, Taiwan

Coordinates: 24.164766°N 120.488579°E

Shengang Township 伸港鄉 Shenkang
- Rural township
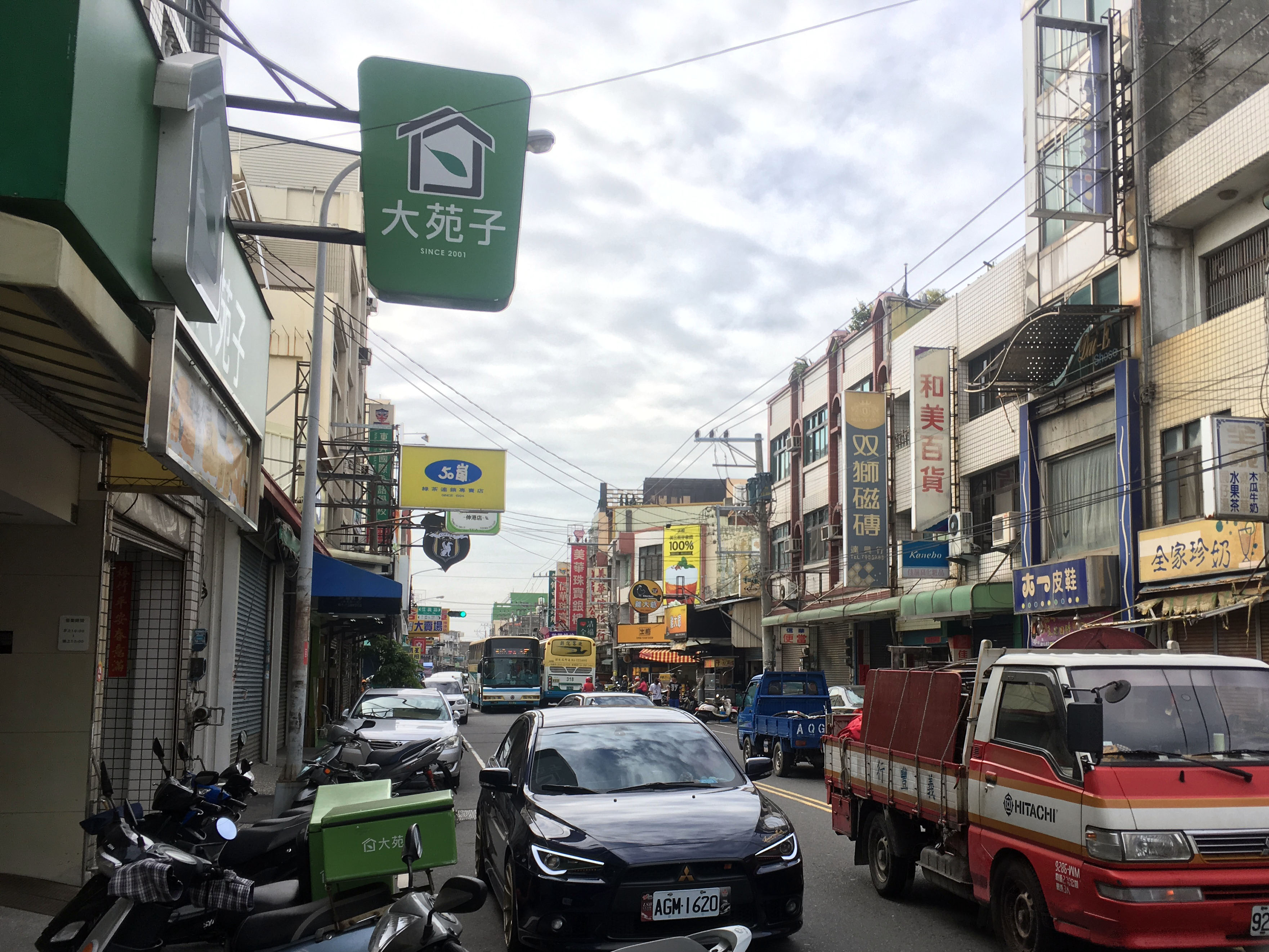

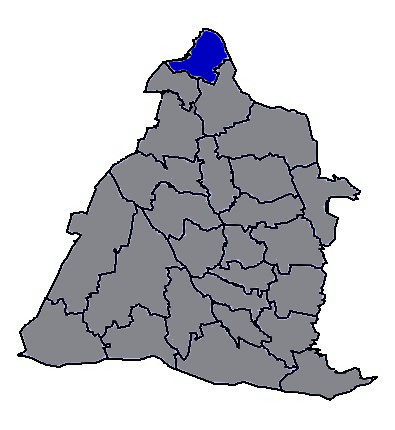
- Shengang Township in Changhua County
- Location: Changhua County, Taiwan

Area
  - Total: 22 km^{2} (8.5 sq mi)

Population (March 2023)
  - Total: 38,088
  - Density: 1,700/km^{2} (4,500/sq mi)

Shengang Township (Chinese: 伸港鄉; pinyin: Shēngǎng Xiāng) is a rural township in Changhua County, Taiwan.

== Geography ==
Shengang had a population of 38,088 as of March 2023, and an area of 30.72 km^{2} (11.86 sq mi).

== History ==
During the Dutch period, the area was within the administrative region of Favorlang (modern-day Huwei, Yunlin).

== Administrative divisions ==
The township comprises 14 villages: Beiqi, Biantou, Datong, Dingxing, Haiwei, Keliao, Qijia, Quancuo, Quanxing, Quanzhou, Shigu, Xide, Xingang and Zengjia.

== Attractions ==
- Fu'an Temple
