= Gangkou Temple =

Temple in Chiayi County, Taiwan

- 港口宮
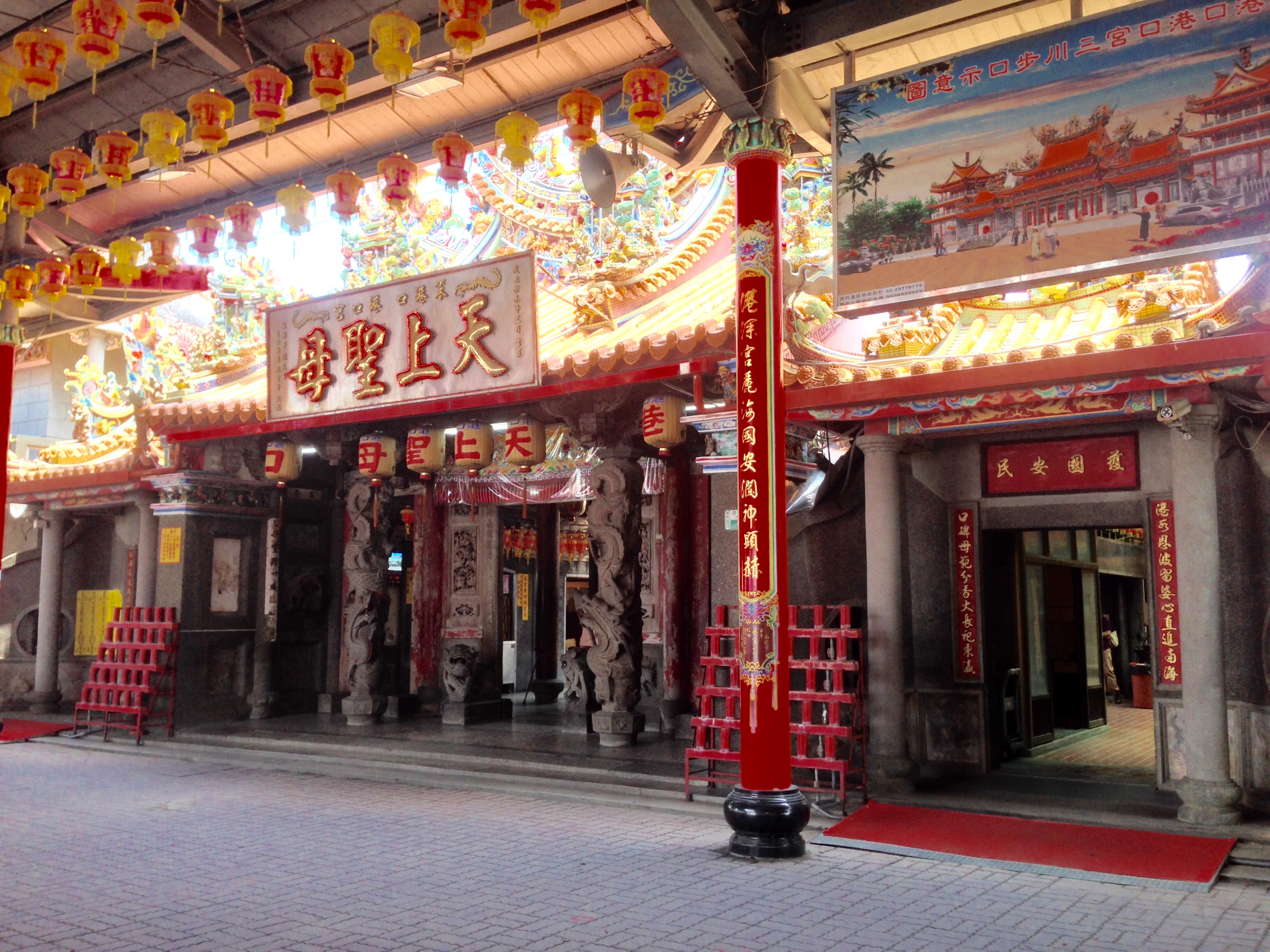
- Facade of the temple

Religion
- Affiliation: Taoism
- Deity: Mazu

Location
- Location: Dongshi, Chiayi
- Country: Taiwan
- Interactive map of Gangkou Temple
- Coordinates: 23.4957°N 120.1857°E

Architecture
- Completed: 1684; 342 years ago
- Direction of façade: Southeast

Bengangkou Gangkou Temple (Chinese: 笨港口港口宮; pinyin: Bèngǎngkǒu Gǎngkǒu Gōng), alternatively known as Bengang Gangkou Temple, is a temple located in Dongshi Township, Chiayi County, Taiwan. Located at the mouth of the Beigang River, the temple is dedicated to the sea goddess Mazu. "Bengangkou" means "entrance of Bengang", where Bengang refers to modern-day Beigang, Yunlin, which is located further up the Beigang River. "Gangkou" translates to "port".

== History ==
Gangkou Temple was founded in 1684 (342 years ago) (Kangxi 33) by a settler named Lin Kai (林楷). Lin Kai migrated from Meizhou Island, the birthplace of Mazu, and landed near the temple's current site. Due to the location's good feng shui, Lin Kai decided to build a simple temple here with the help of local residents, which he named "Tianhouxing Temple" (笨港口天后行宮). The temple was rebuilt into a brick structure in 1811. In 1871, a Qing Dynasty government official named Xie Long-guang (謝龍光) travelled from Guangzhou here and gifted the temple with a plaque, the temple was renamed to Gangkou Temple. Later, the temple was rebuilt two more times, in 1904 and 1948, into its current form.

In 2005, temple officials announced that they planned to build a larger temple on the site, citing the temple's cramped interior and damage from weather. A groundbreaking ceremony was held in August 2005 and the temple began fundraising. A temporary temple was also built nearby to house the Mazu statue. However, construction never started due to constant refusals from Mazu based on poe divination. In 2020, the temple announced that Mazu agreed to renovating the temple instead.

== Traditions ==
Gangkou Temple hosts a major Ghost Festival event in the seventh month of the lunar calendar. This tradition dates back to 1845, when a flood on the Beigang River forced some people to migrate from the north bank to the south bank, where they formed six villages. Therefore, every year, these residents hold a celebration at Gangkou Temple to pray for protection against further floods. This celebration is recognized by the Chiayi County Government as a cultural asset.
