= Lugang =

Lugang or Lukang may refer to:

- Lugang, Shantou (胪岗镇), a town in Chaonan District, Shantou, Guangdong, People's Republic of China
- Lugang station (芦港站), a railway station in Ningbo City, Zhejiang Province, People's Republic of China
- Lukang, Changhua (鹿港鎮), an urban township of Changhua County, Taiwan, Republic of China
  - Lukang Ai Gate (鹿港隘門)
  - Lukang Artist Village (鹿港藝術村)
  - Lukang Culture Center (鹿港公會堂)
  - Lukang Folk Arts Museum (鹿港民俗文物館)
  - Lukang Kinmen Hall (鹿港金門館)
  - Lukang Longshan Temple (鹿港龍山寺)
  - Lukang Rimao Hang (鹿港日茂行)
  - Lukang Tianhou Temple (鹿港天后宮)
  - Lukang Wen Wu Temple (鹿港文武廟)

See also

- Lu Gang (born 1970), Chinese weightlifter
- Lu Guang (disambiguation), several people
