= BRAND'S Health Museum =

Museum in Lukang, Changhua County, Taiwan

- 白蘭氏健康博物館
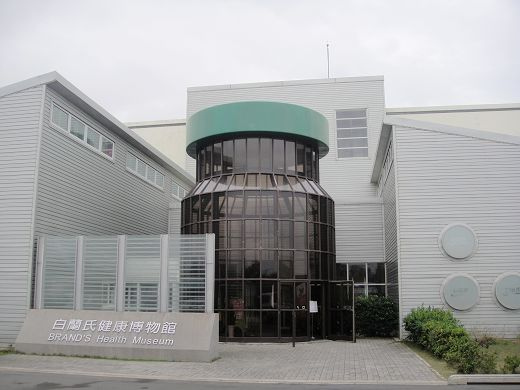
- Established: November 2003
- Location: Lukang, Changhua County, Taiwan
- Coordinates: 24°04′40″N 120°24′01″E
- Type: museum

The BRAND'S Health Museum (traditional Chinese: 白蘭氏健康博物館; simplified Chinese: 白兰氏健康博物馆; pinyin: Báilánshì Jiànkāng Bówùguǎn) is a museum in Changhua Coastal Industrial Park, Lukang Township, Changhua County, Taiwan.

== History ==
The museum was set up by BRAND'S Essences in November 2003 at the Changhua Coastal Industrial Park. Overhaul renovations were done in April and May 2008.

== Architecture ==
The museum consists of four exhibition areas, which are the brand story house, multimedia interactive experience area, health market and skywalk.

== See also ==
- List of museums in Taiwan
