= Hsingneng Power Plant =

Power plant in Lukang, Changhua County, Taiwan

Hsingneng Power Plant 星能電廠
- Country: Republic of China
- Location: Lukang, Changhua County, Taiwan
- Coordinates: 24°7′38″N 120°26′01″E
- Status: Operational
- Commission date: March 2004
- Owner: Star Energy Power Corporation
- Operator: Star Energy Power Corporation

Thermal power station
- Primary fuel: Natural gas

Power generation
- Units operational: 1
- Make and model: Mitsubishi Heavy Industries (gas turbines); Toshiba (steam turbine)
- Nameplate capacity: 490 MW

External links
- Commons: Related media on Commons

The Hsingneng Power Plant, Star Energy Power Plant or Changbin Power Plant (traditional Chinese: 星能電廠; simplified Chinese: 星能电厂; pinyin: Xīngnéng Diànchǎng) is a gas-fired power plant in Changhua Coastal Industrial Park, Lukang Township, Changhua County, Taiwan.

== History ==
The power plant was commissioned in March 2004 and started its operation in April 2004.

== Technical specifications ==
The power plant consists of one combined cycle generation unit with an installed capacity of 490 MW.

== See also ==
- List of power stations in Taiwan
- Electricity sector in Taiwan
