= Lukang Kinmen Hall =

Former hall in Lukang, Changhua County, Taiwan

- 鹿港金門館
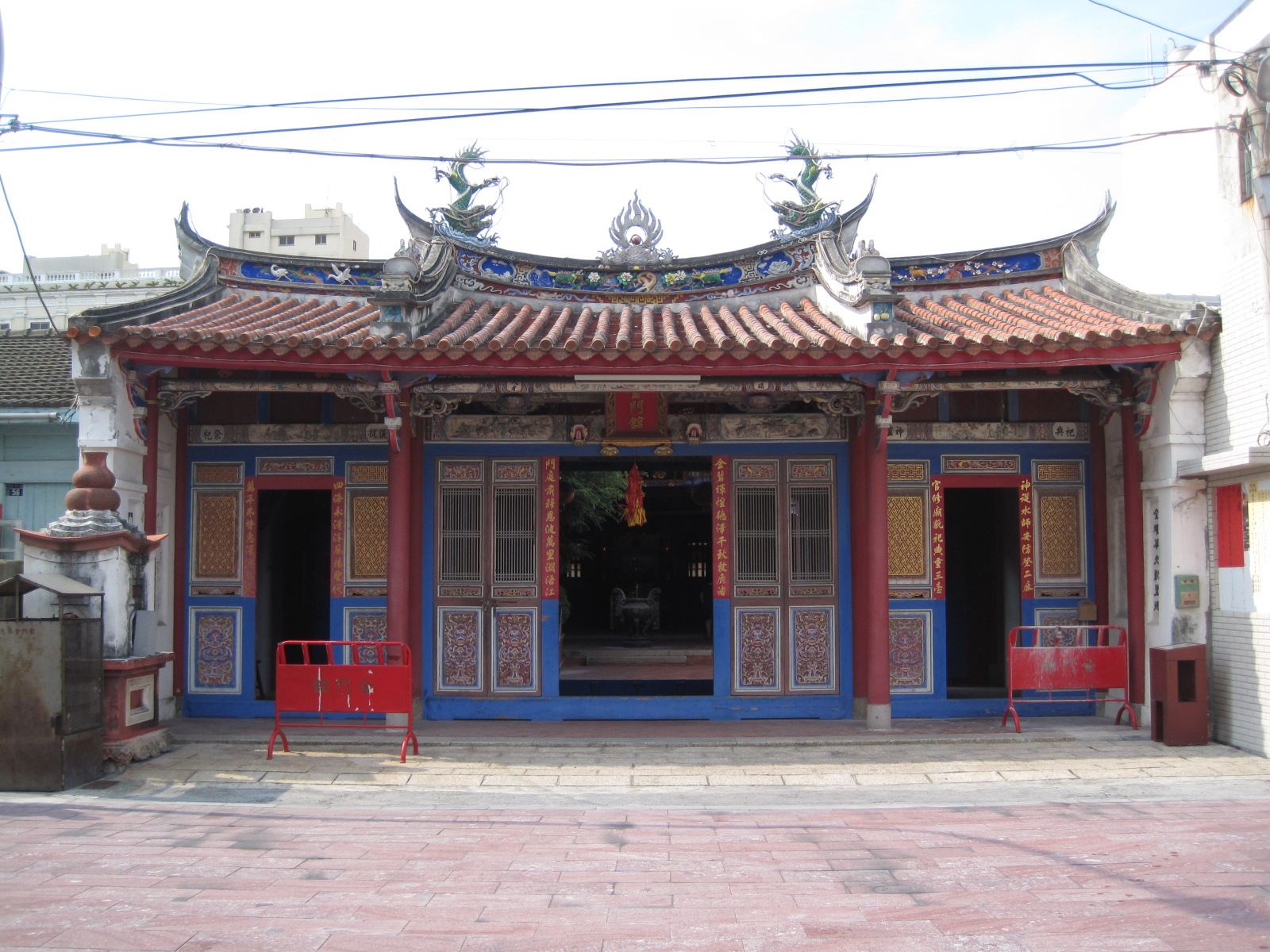
- Interactive map of the Lukang Kinmen Hall area
- Former names: Wu Jiang Guan

General information
- Type: former hall
- Location: Lukang, Changhua County, Taiwan
- Coordinates: 24°03′00.0″N 120°26′07.8″E
- Completed: 1805
- Renovated: 1855, 1908, 1975, June 1994

The Lukang Kinmen Hall (traditional Chinese: 鹿港金門館; simplified Chinese: 鹿港金门馆; pinyin: Lùgǎng Jīnmén Guǎn) is a historical hall located in Lukang Township, Changhua County, Taiwan.

== History ==
The hall was originally constructed in 1805 as a temple to enshrine Sufu Wangye by the son of Xu Le-shan. It was initially called the Wu Jiang Guan. Xu also donated the tablet Wu Jiang Guan which hangs in the main hall. The hall also served as a gathering place for people and the navy. In 1848, an earthquake in Changhua damaged the building, which was subsequently restored in 1855 with funds and labor from the navy. Upon completion, an engraved stone tablet was placed on the wall of the sacrificial hall.

During the Japanese rule of Taiwan, the hall was partially renovated in 1908. After this, repair work was done to the main hall and Sanchuan hall in 1975. In June 1994, the Changhua County Government undertook historic site restoration work. On 25 October 2000, the Kinmen Hall was designated a county-level historic site.

== Transportation ==
The temple is accessible west of Changhua Station on Taiwan Railway.

== See also ==
- Wang Ye worship
- Lukang Tianhou Temple
- Lukang Wen Wu Temple
- List of tourist attractions in Taiwan
