= Siansi =

Siansi may refer to:

- Siansi Township in rural China
- Saesse, a Coahuiltecan tribe sometimes spelled Siansi
