= Yu Jen Jai =

Taiwanese bakery in Lukang, Changhua County

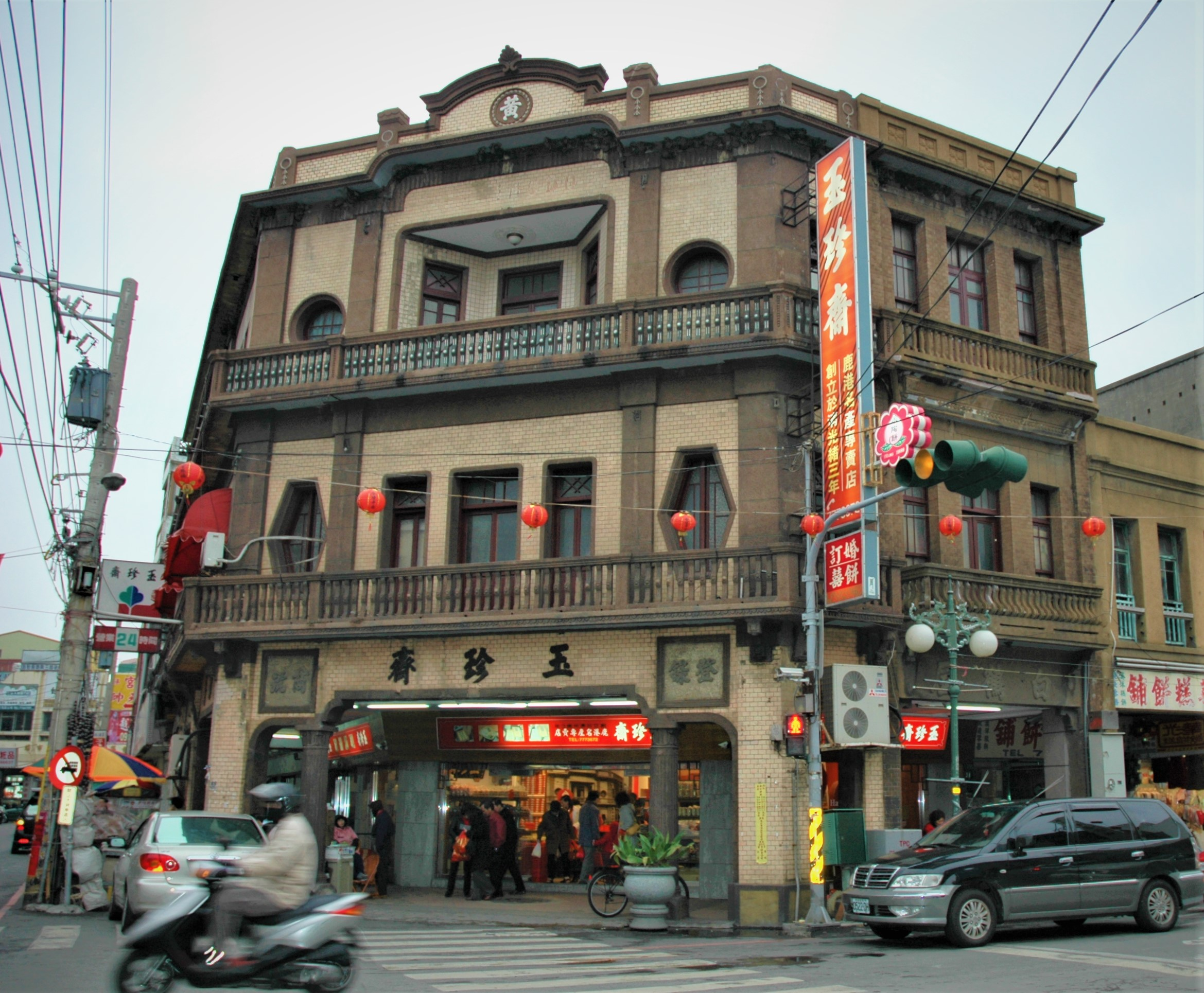
- Yu Jen Jai's flagship store in Lukang
- Native name: 玉珍齋
- Company type: bakery
- Founded: 1877
- Founder: Jin Huang
- Headquarters: Lukang, Changhua, Taiwan
- Products: Chinese pastries
- Owner: I-Pin Huang
- Website: www.1877.com.tw

Yu Jen Jai (Chinese: 玉珍齋; pinyin: Yùzhēnzhāi; Pe̍h-ōe-jī: Gi̍k Tin Tsai) is a bakery located in Lukang Township, Changhua County, Taiwan. It was founded in 1877, and specializes in Chinese pastries. The original building is listed as a protected historical site by the Ministry of Culture. Yu Jen Jai is among the oldest existing shops in Taiwan and its products, most notably its "egg yolk pastry" (蛋黃酥), are often listed among the best Taiwanese souvenirs.

== History ==
Yu Jen Jai was founded in 1877 by Jin Huang (黃錦) selling "Phoenix Eye Cakes" (鳳眼糕). The original store was built in the Baroque style in 1930, and the bakery has been housed in this building since. The current owner is the fourth generation descendant of the founder. The bakery also has shops around Taiwan.

As part of the Lukang City Government's efforts to demolish illegal structures, Yu Jen Jai's second branch store in Lukang had its veranda demolished in 2012. Its main store had delayed demolition by arguing that the building is historically significant.
