= Lukang Culture Center =

Cultural center in Lukang, Changhua County, Taiwan

- 鹿港公會堂
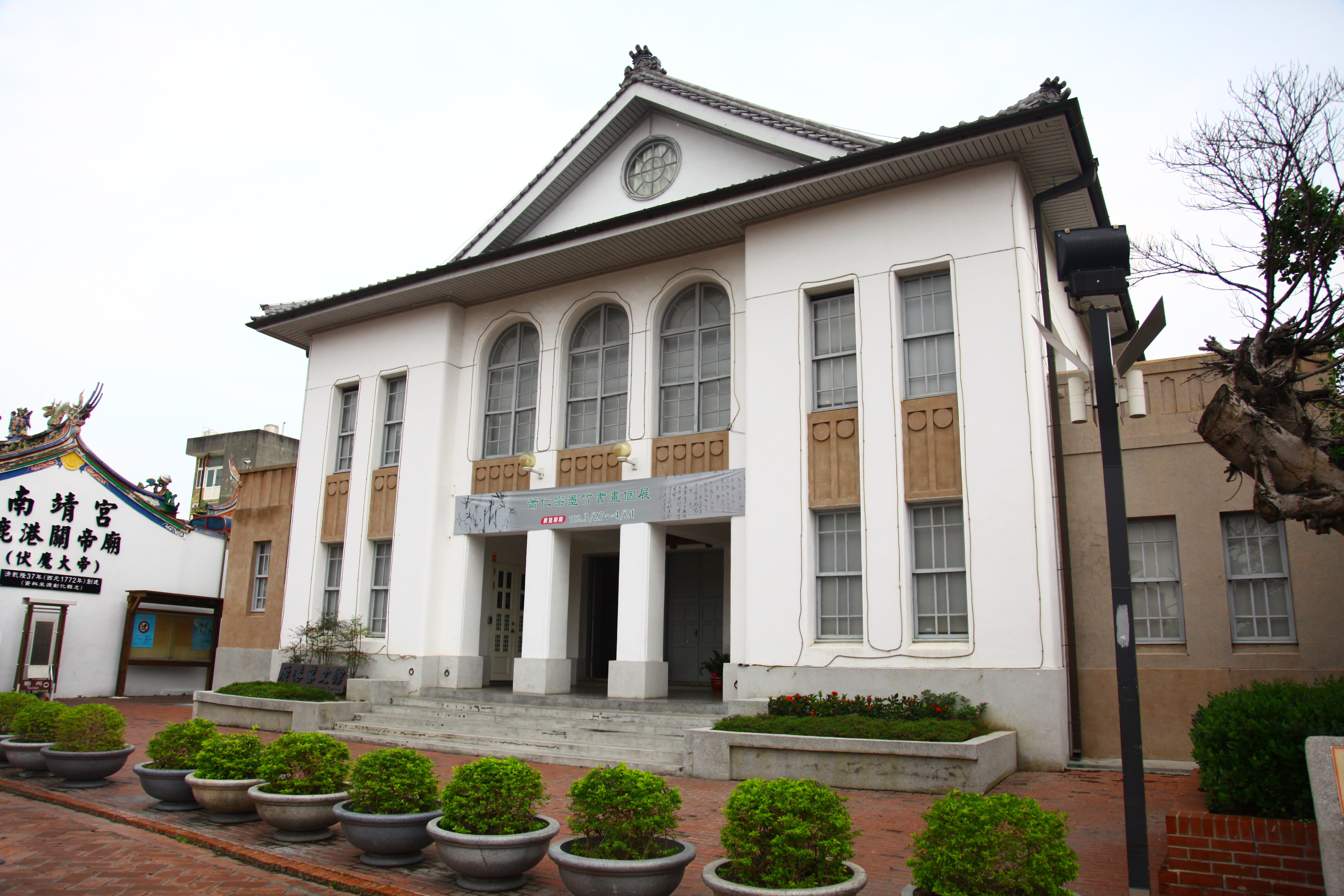
- Interactive map of the Lukang Culture Center area
- Former names: Chung Shan Hall

General information
- Type: cultural center
- Location: Lukang, Changhua County, Taiwan
- Coordinates: 24°03′27.6″N 120°25′54.6″E
- Completed: 1928
- Operator: Lukang Township Government

The Lukang Culture Center or Lukang Assembly Hall (traditional Chinese: 鹿港公會堂; simplified Chinese: 鹿港公会堂; pinyin: Lùgǎng Gōnghuì Táng) is a cultural center in Lukang Township, Changhua County, Taiwan.

== History ==
The building was established in 1928 as a public assembly hall. It was named Chung Shan Hall after the handover of Taiwan from Japan to the Republic of China in 1945. It was once used as a senior citizens center and Wanchun Gong Suhu Laoyeh Temple. After renovation, it was renamed Lukang Culture Center.

== Architecture ==
The roof framework of the building was constructed by wood and steel trusses and the top was paved with cement tiling. On the left wall is a wooden monument about local gentlemen's donating money to build the hall.

== See also ==
- List of tourist attractions in Taiwan
