= Lukang Folk Arts Museum =

Museum in Lukang, Changhua County, Taiwan

- 鹿港民俗文物館
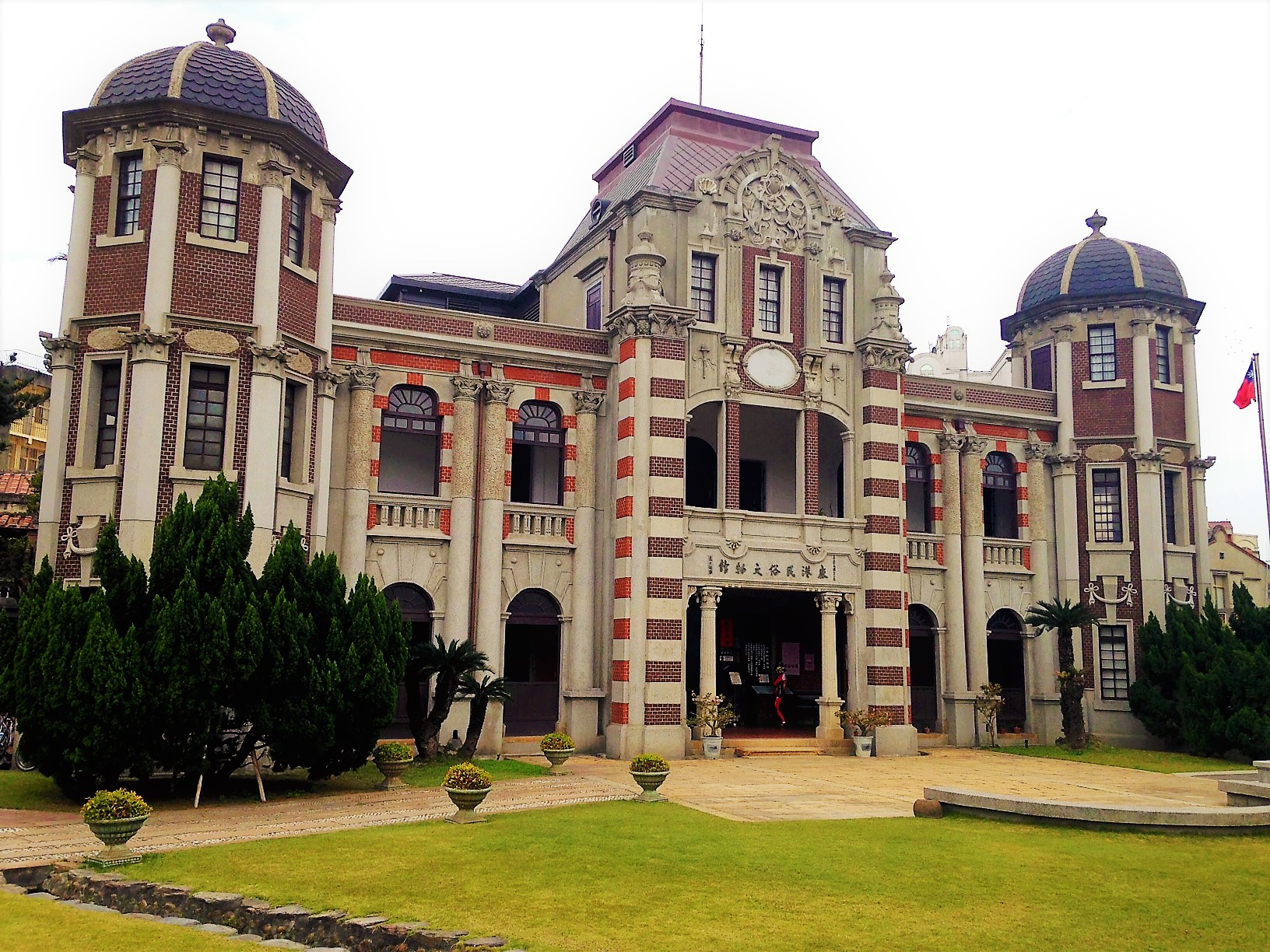
- Established: 1973
- Location: Lukang, Changhua County, Taiwan
- Coordinates: 24°03′14″N 120°26′10″E
- Type: art museum
- Chairperson: Koo Zhong-liang
- Architect: Moriyama Matsunosuke
- Owner: Koo family

The Lukang Folk Arts Museum (traditional Chinese: 鹿港民俗文物館; simplified Chinese: 鹿港民俗文物馆; pinyin: Lùgǎng Mínsú Wénwùguǎn) is a museum in Lukang Township, Changhua County, Taiwan.

== History ==
The museum was originally built as a residence of Koo Hsien-jung. The construction started in 1913 and was completed 6 years later in 1919. In the 1920s and 1930s, the building became the venue for international conferences with foreign dignitaries. In 1973, the building was converted into the Lukang Folk Arts Museum, with all the buildings, land, furniture, utensils and collector's items having been donated by the Koo family and other private benefactors. The museum holds more than 6,000 articles. The items exhibited in the museum mostly date from the mid-Qing dynasty to the early years of the Republic. Household, travel, and recreational items, as well as religious implements and celebratory artifacts are displayed for visitors.

== Architecture ==
The museum was designed by Japanese architect Moriyama Matsunosuke. The building has a strong local flavor. The architecture of the museum and the pieces housed within not only demonstrate craftsmanship, but also a thriving history of Lukang.

The museum has the following buildings:

- Yang Building: The Yang Building was built in 1919. The design and materials used in the Meiji styled structure are excellent examples of that time in Taiwan.
- Ku Feng Building: This 18th century wood and brick structure is of a Min-nan (Southern Fukien) style. The building has a traditional feel to it.

== Exhibition ==
The museum houses a collection of Ming and Qing dynasty artifacts: vintage photographs, lacquer ware, porcelain, carved stones, embroidery, musical instruments, and other items. The building is an unusual combination of Asian architecture and Western architecture.

== Transportation ==
The museum is accessible by bus from Changhua Station of Taiwan Railway.

== See also ==
- List of museums in Taiwan
