= Lu Guang =

Lu Guang is the name of:

== People ==
- Lü Guang (337–400), 3rd-century Chinese emperor
- Lu Guang (painter), Yuan dynasty (1271–1368) Chinese landscape painter and poet
- Lu Guang (photographer) (born 1961), Chinese photographer

== Fictional characters ==
- Lu Guang, one of the main protagonists from the donghua drama Link Clink
