= Changhua Coastal Industrial Park =

Industrial park in Changhua County, Taiwan

Coordinates: 24.089°N 120.406°E

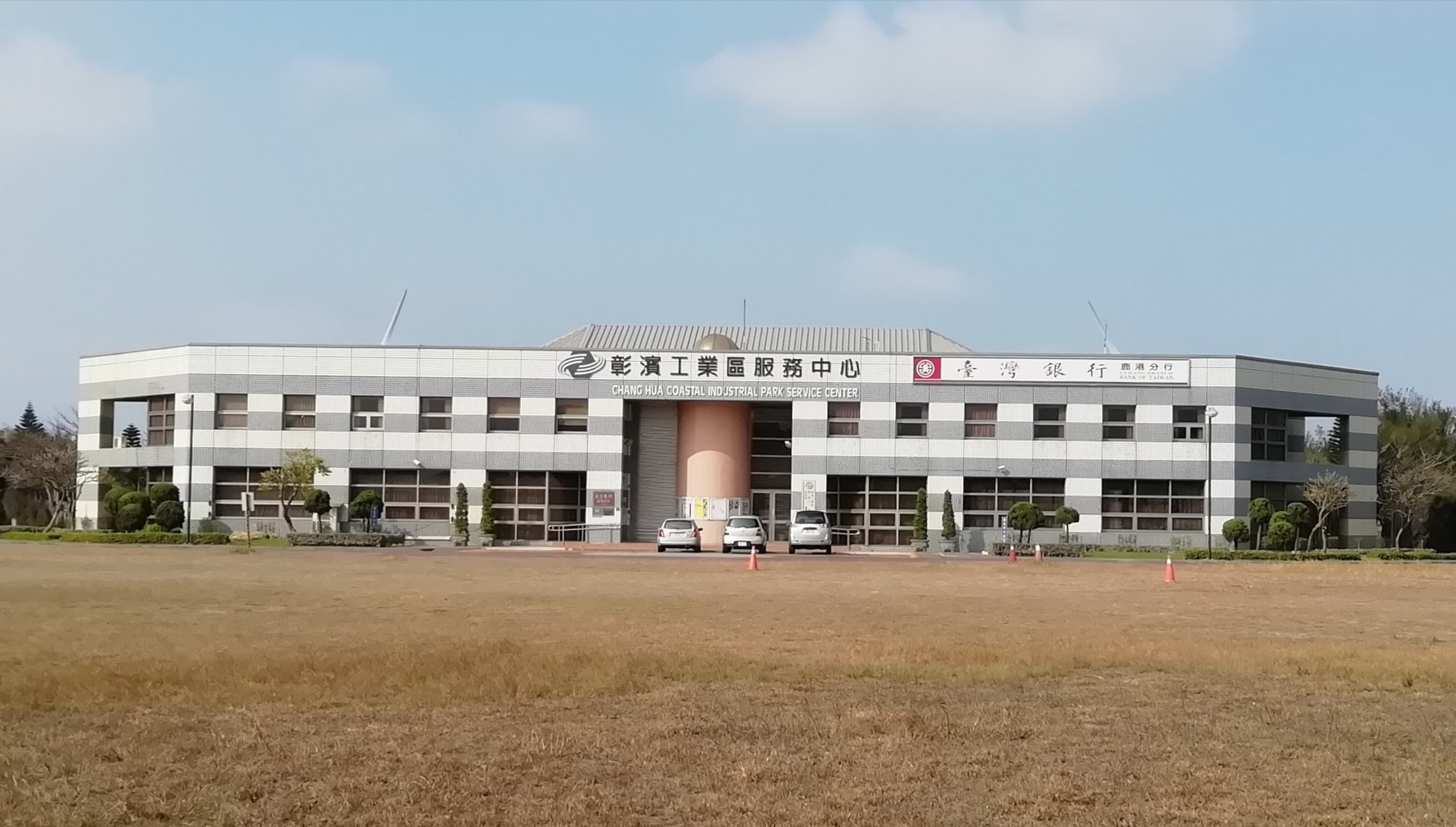
Changhua Coastal Industrial Park in Lukang Township

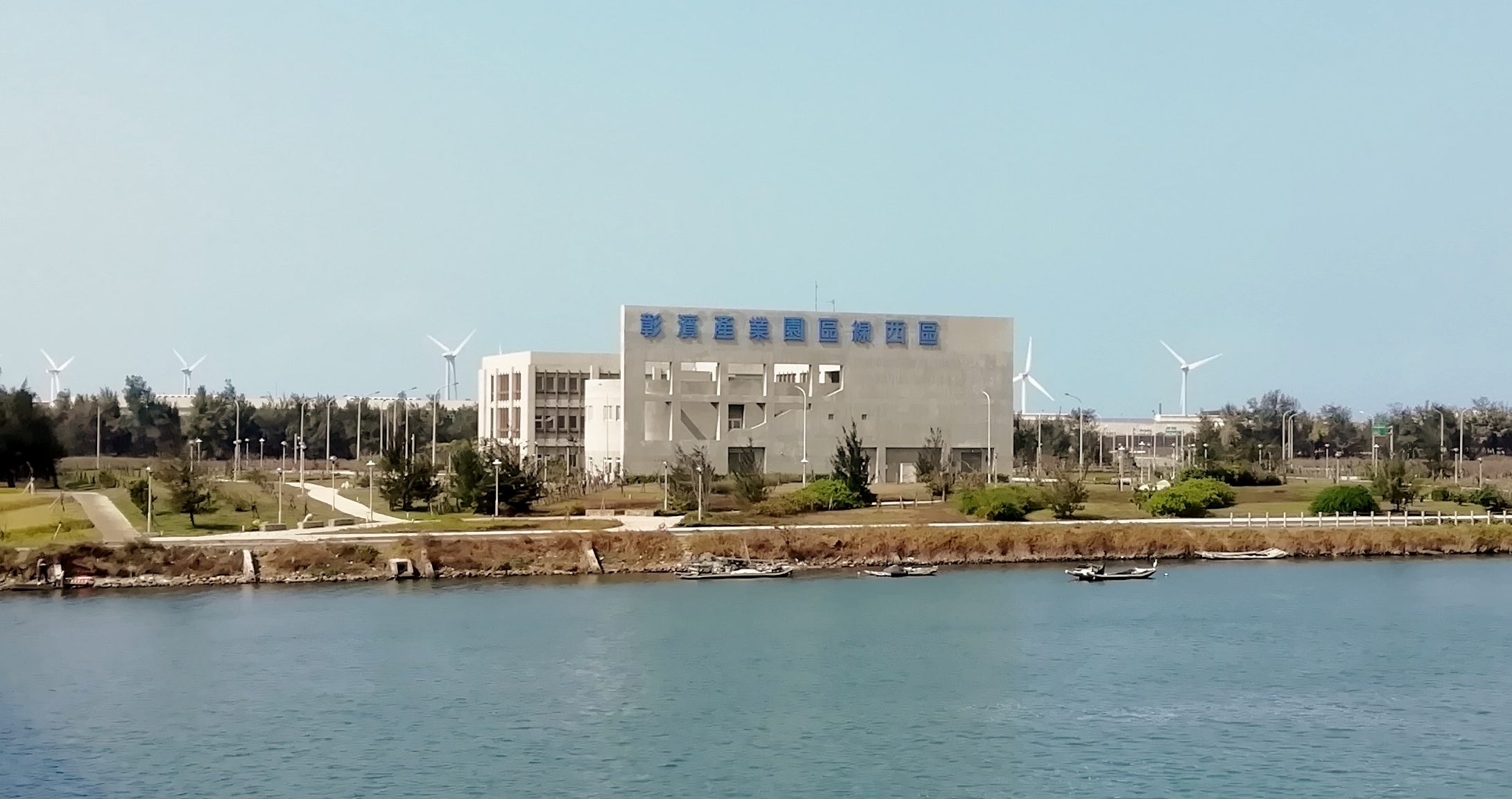
Changhua Coastal Industrial Park in Xianxi Township

Changhua Coastal Industrial Park (Chinese: 彰化濱海產業園區; simply 彰濱產業園區, Changbin Industrial Park) is located on reclaimed land in the coast of Changhua County of Taiwan, spanning Lukang Township, Xianxi Township and Shengang Township.

It is an industrial cluster in Taiwan, with many different industries such as food production, spinning, chemical industries and metal processors. The site has many wind turbines, with over 200 turbines that serve as one of the most famous coastal landmarks in Changhua.
