= Lukang Artist Village =

Art center in Lukang, Changhua County, Taiwan

- 鹿港藝術村
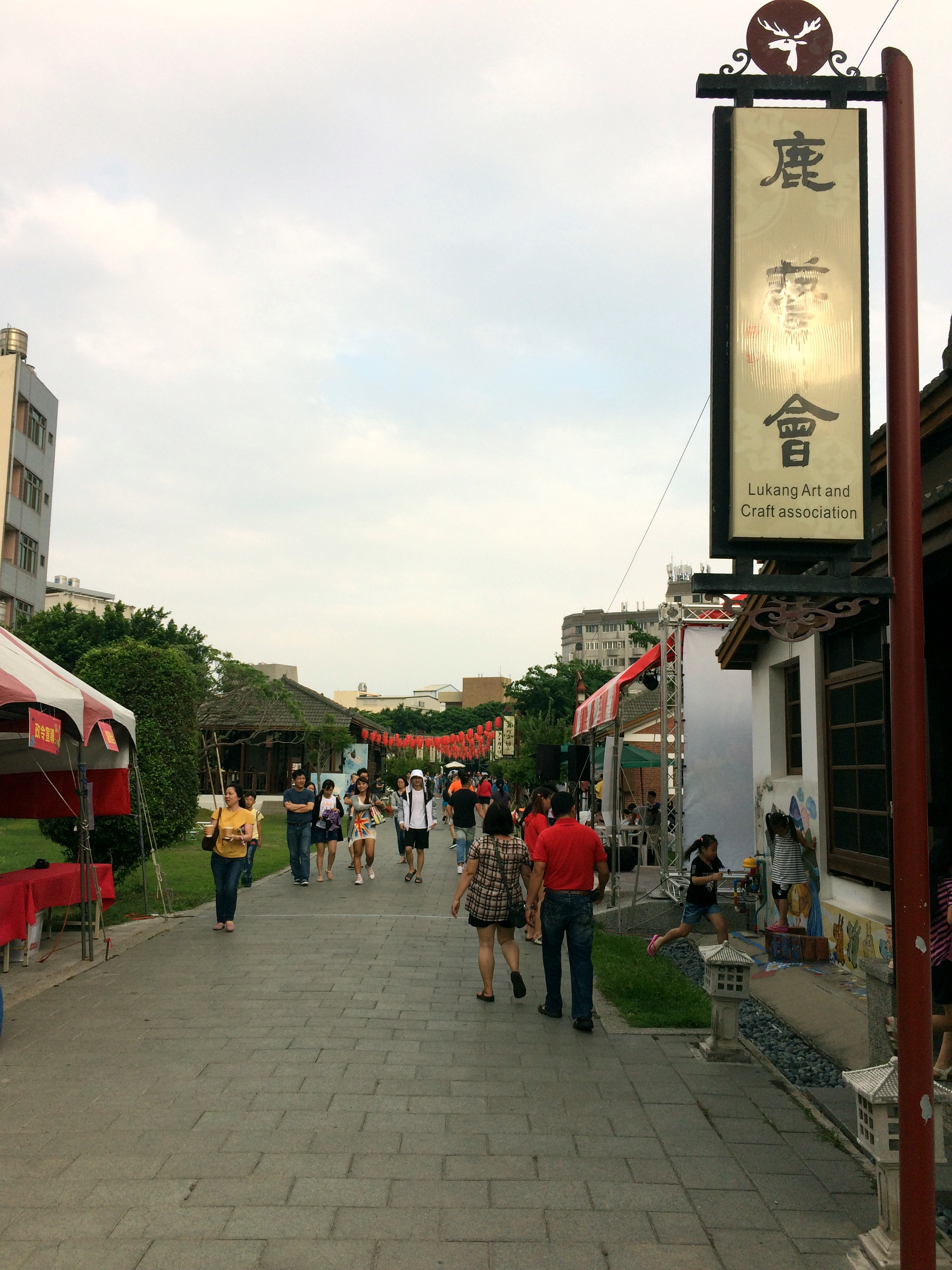
- Interactive map of Lukang Artist Village
- Location: Lukang, Changhua County, Taiwan
- Coordinates: 24°03′21.4″N 120°25′54.0″E
- Type: art center

Construction
- Opened: May 2010

The Lukang Artist Village (traditional Chinese: 鹿港藝術村; simplified Chinese: 鹿港艺术村; pinyin: Lùgǎng Yìshù Cūn) is an art center in Lukang Township, Changhua County, Taiwan.

== History ==
The area was originally the working area for fish farmers to catch mullets from river in the area and was called Sha Zhou. During the Japanese rule of Taiwan, the river was filled to construct roads and houses. After the handover of Taiwan from Japan to the Republic of China in 1945, the area was taken by the government and managed by Lukang Township Office. In 2009, the office secured a fund to refurbish the area and turn it into Lukang Artist Village. was officially opened in May 2010.

== Architecture ==
The village consists of leisure zones, outdoor green stage etc.

== Activities ==
The village regularly holds various activities such as art exhibitions, art and literary activities, culture trips etc.

== See also ==
- List of tourist attractions in Taiwan
