= Lukang Ai Gate =

Gate in Lukang, Changhua County, Taiwan

- 鹿港隘門
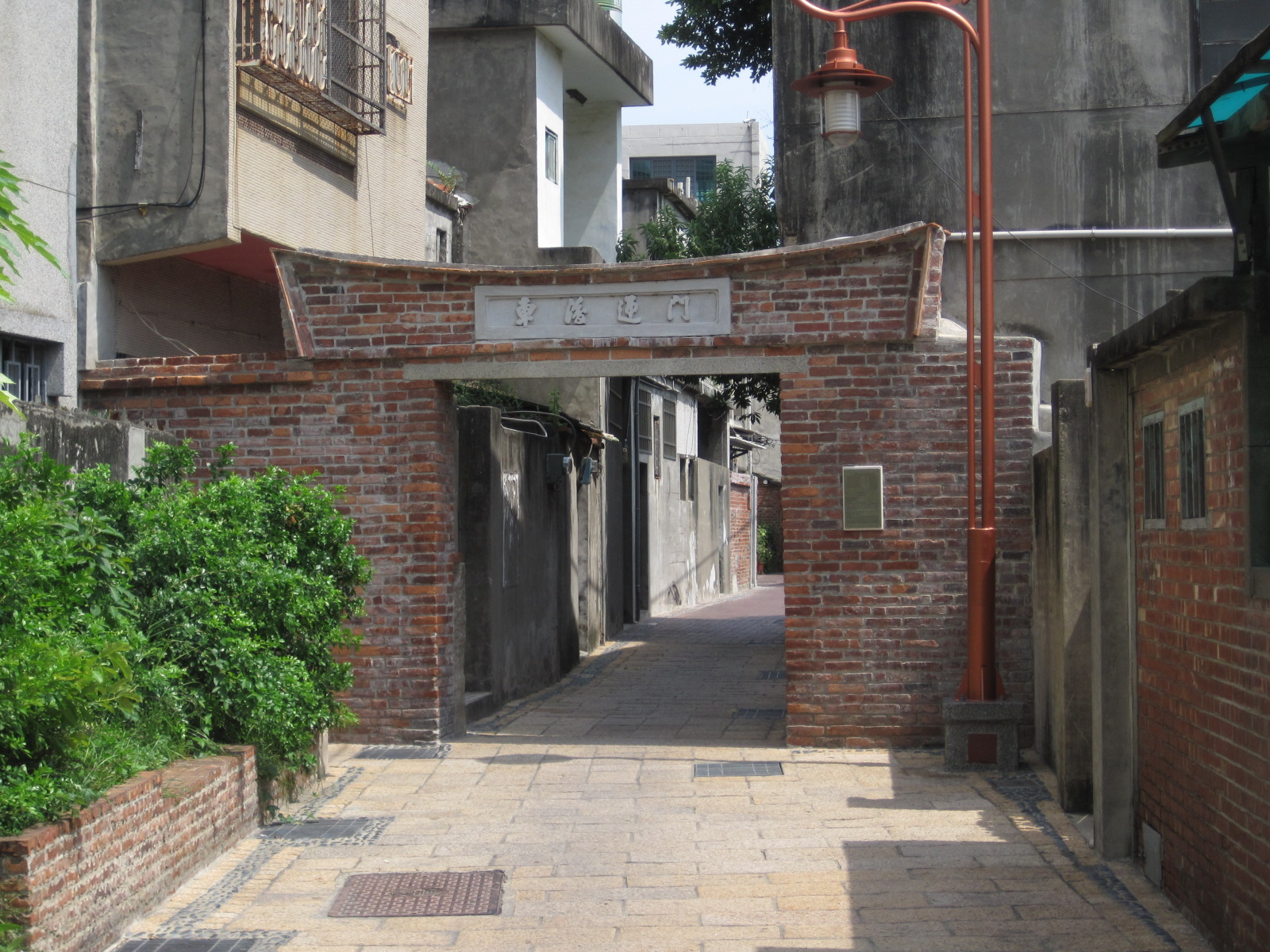
- Interactive map of the Lukang Ai Gate area

General information
- Type: gate
- Location: Lukang, Changhua County, Taiwan
- Coordinates: 24°04′28.1″N 120°33′25.3″E
- Completed: 1839

The Lukang Ai Gate (traditional Chinese: 鹿港隘門; simplified Chinese: 鹿港隘门; pinyin: Lùgǎng Ài Mén) is an old gate in Lukang Township, Changhua County, Taiwan.

== History ==
In early days, Lukang experienced many war and rights from people of Quanzhou and Zhangzhou for distinguishing their territory. To maintain safety of the area, local businessmen established the Ai Gate at borders as fortification during reign of Daoguang Emperor of Qing Dynasty in 1839. During night times, people would close the gate to prevent invasion of outsiders.

== Architecture ==
The height of the gate is 3.3 meters and its width is 2.7 meters. It has a 門迎後車 writing on it. It is divided into three types, which are boundary Ai Gate, roadway Ai Gate and Bujiantian Street's Ai Gate.

== See also ==
- List of tourist attractions in Taiwan
