= Xianxi, Changhua =

Rural township in Changhua County, Taiwan

Coordinates: 24.133438°N 120.458881°E

Xianxi Township 線西鄉 Siansi; Hsienhsi
- Rural township
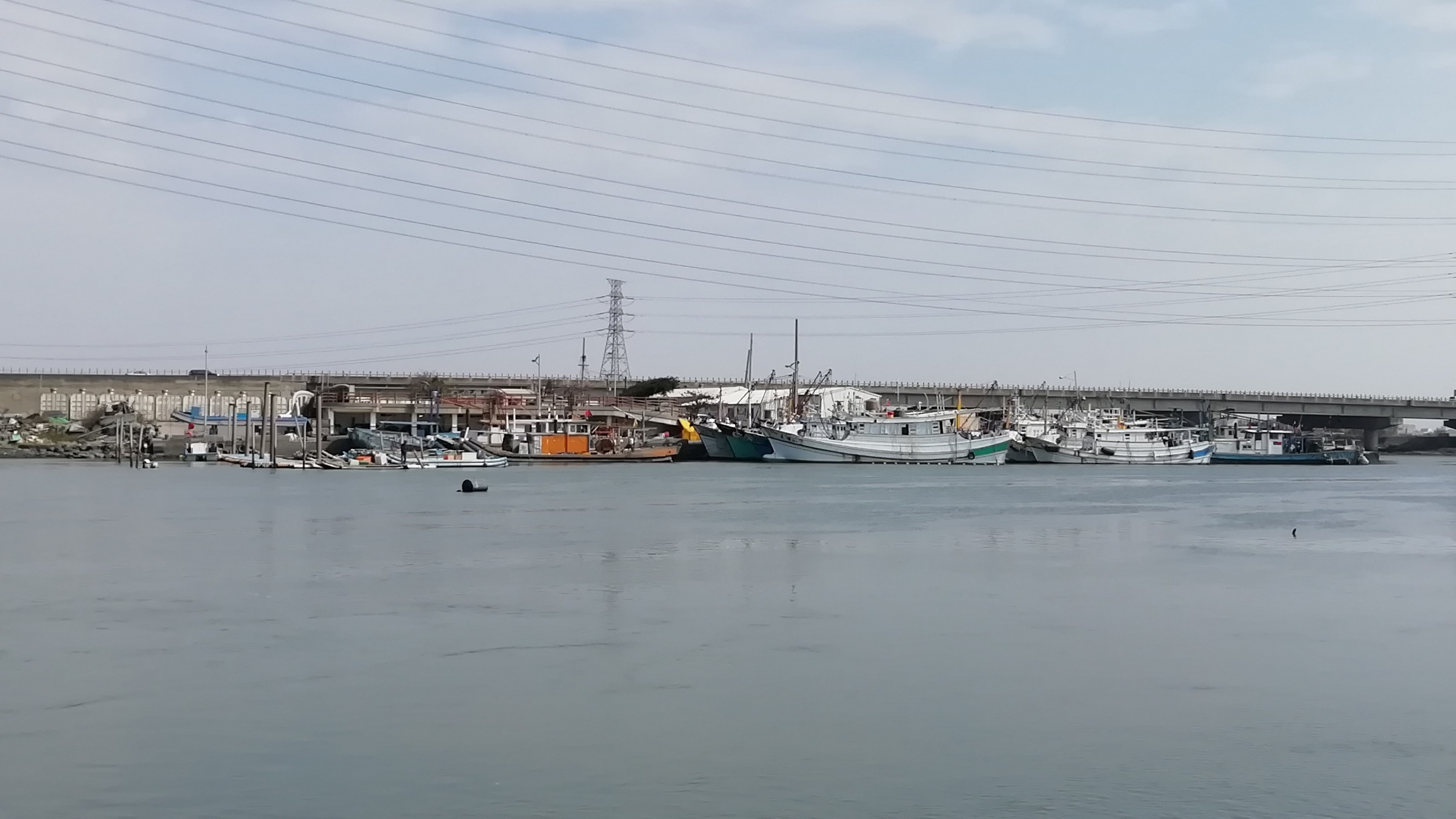
- Fishing port in Xianxi

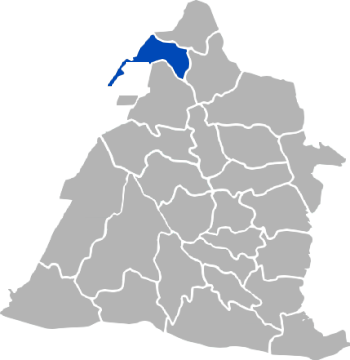
- Xianxi Township in Changhua County
- Location: Changhua County, Taiwan

Area
  - Total: 18 km^{2} (6.9 sq mi)

Population (January 2023)
  - Total: 16,310
  - Density: 910/km^{2} (2,300/sq mi)

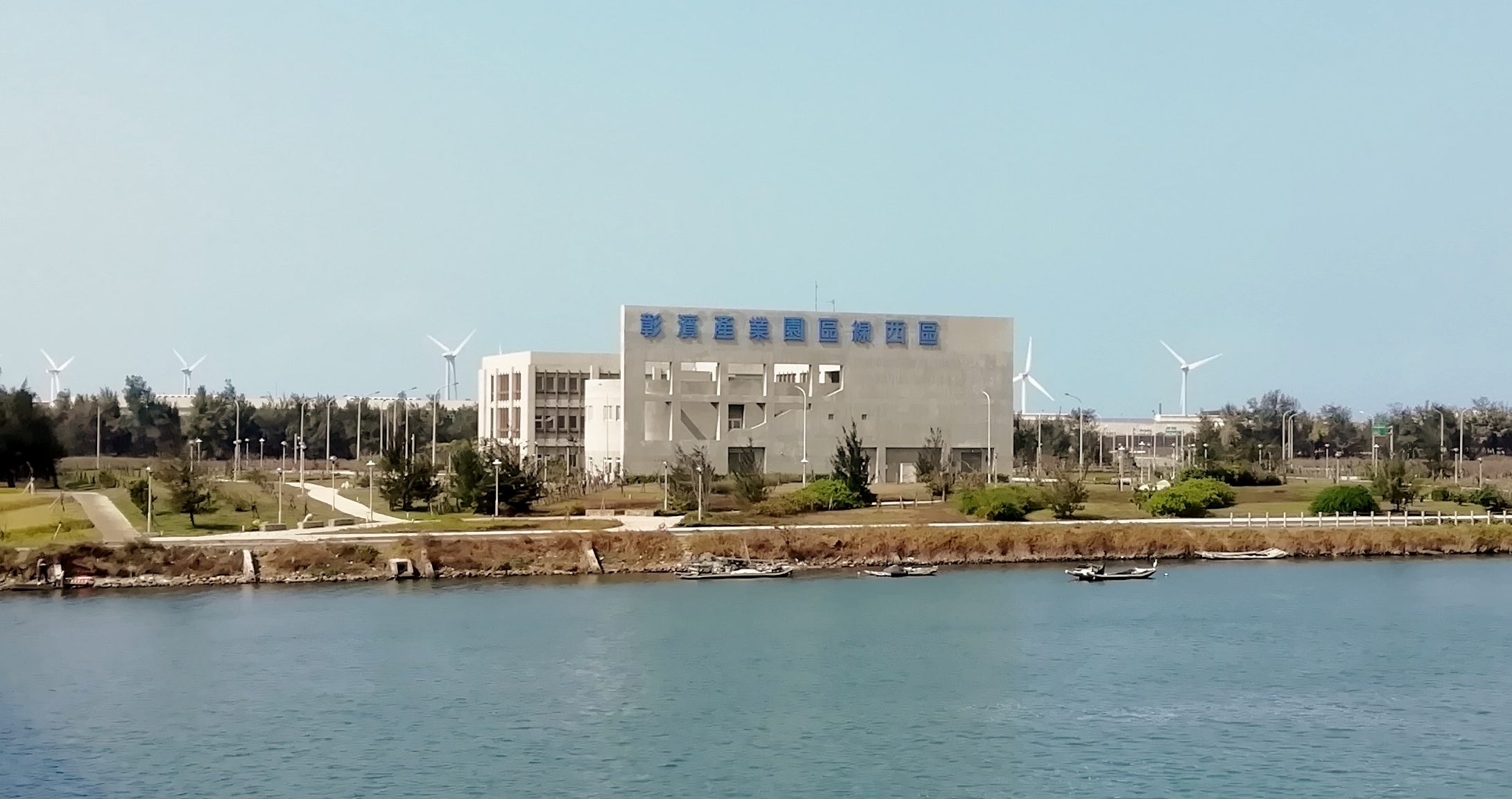
Changhua Coastal Industrial Park in Xianxi Township

Xianxi Township or Siansi Township (Chinese: 線西鄉; pinyin: Xiànxi Xiāng, Wade-giles: Hsianhsi) is a rural township in Changhua County, Taiwan with 16,310 residents (January 2023). With an area of 18.1 square kilometres, it is the smallest township in the county.

== Administrative divisions ==
The township comprises eight villages: Dexing, Dingli, Dingzhuang, Gounei, Wenzi, Xiali, Xianxi and Yupu.
