= Lukang Longshan Temple =

Chinese temple in Lukang, Changhua County, Taiwan

- 鹿港龍山寺
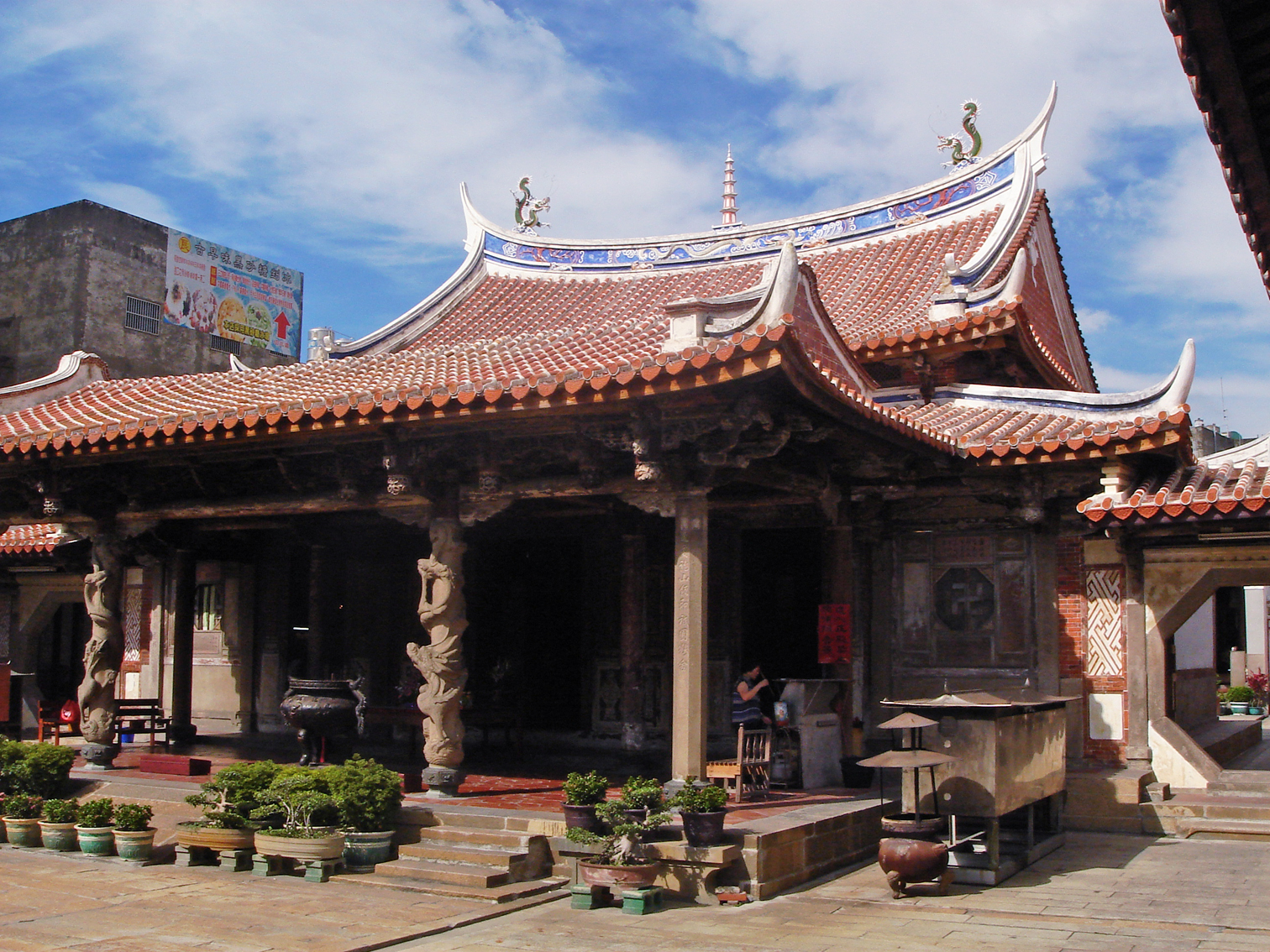

- Location within Changhua County

Location
- Location: Lukang, Changhua County, Taiwan
- Coordinates: 24°03′01.7″N 120°26′08.1″E

Architecture
- Type: temple
- Completed: 1653; 1786 (current site)
- Interior area: 891 m^{2}

The Lukang Longshan Temple (traditional Chinese: 鹿港龍山寺; simplified Chinese: 鹿港龙山寺; pinyin: Lùgǎng Lóngshān Sì; Pe̍h-ōe-jī: Lo̍k-káng Liông-san-sī) is a Guanyin temple in Lukang Township, Changhua County, Taiwan.

== History ==
The temple was originally constructed in 1738 as a small temple. It was then later remodeled by local residents to a larger scale. The much expanded incarnation seen today is renowned for its exquisite woodcarvings, as well as for its stone sculptures, a noteworthy example of which are the 12 major support columns in the main hall, twined by auspicious dragons hewn from solid stone. In 1999, the temple was damaged by an earthquake. It was then repaired and reopened in 2008.

== Architecture ==
The temple spans over an area of 891 m^{2}. The temple is a square building, with its main building consists of four strata and three gardens. A pair of granite dragon pole sits at the front of the gate. At the end of front hall, there is a theater stage for traditional plays at festivals.

== Transportation ==
The temple is accessible south west from Changhua Station of Taiwan Railway.

== See also ==
- Bangka Lungshan Temple
- Fengshan Longshan Temple
- List of tourist attractions in Taiwan
