= Lukang Rimao Hang =

Former company in Lukang, Changhua County, Taiwan

- 鹿港日茂行
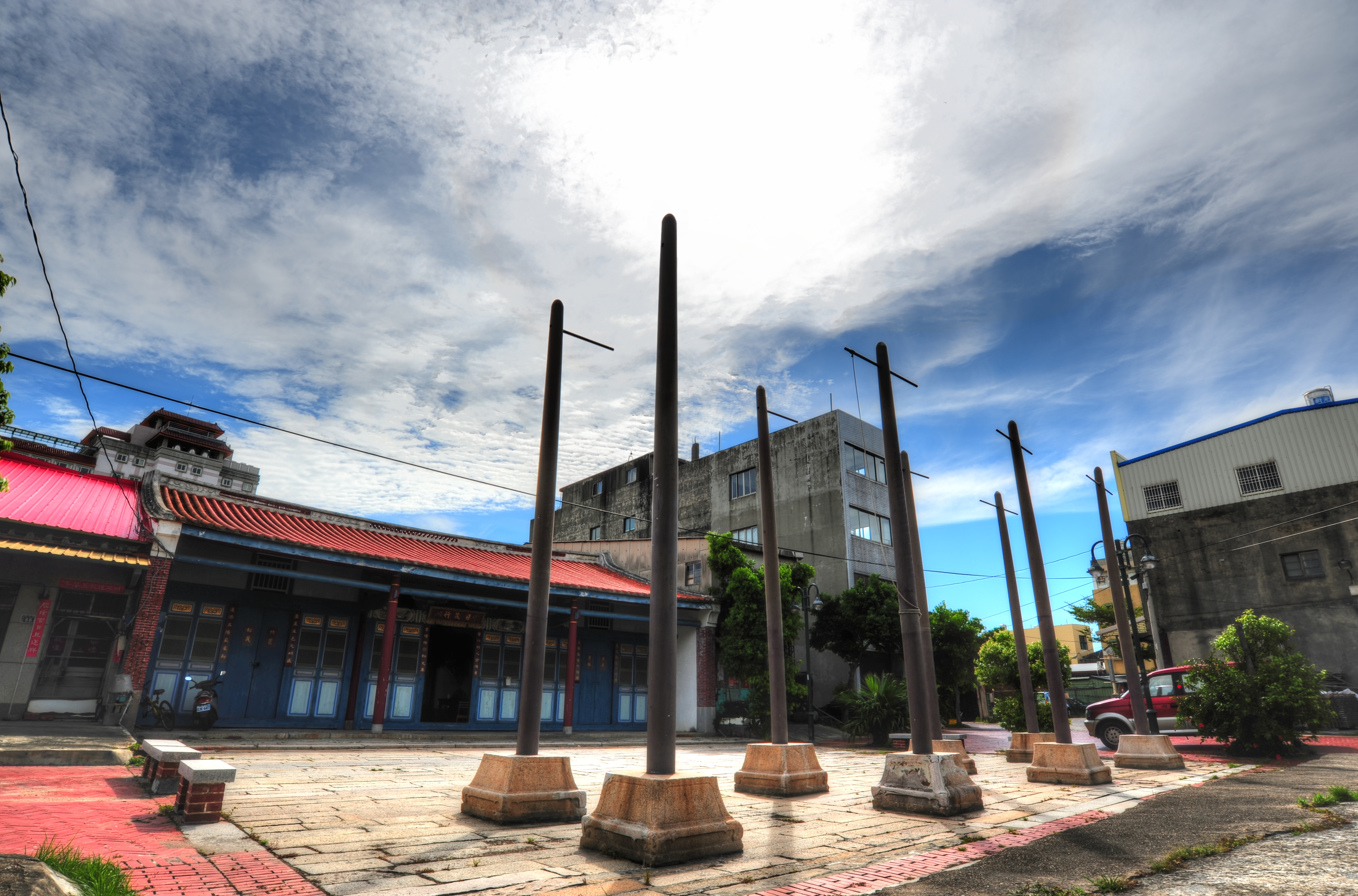
- Interactive map of the Lukang Rimao Hang area

General information
- Type: former company
- Location: Lukang, Changhua County, Taiwan
- Coordinates: 24°03′32.5″N 120°25′45.2″E
- Completed: 1784

The Lukang Rimao Hang (Chinese: 鹿港日茂行; pinyin: Lùgǎng Rìmào Háng) is a historic building in Lukang Township, Changhua County, Taiwan.

== History ==
The Lukang Rimao Hang was built in 1784 by Lin Zhensong who came from Fujian and settled in Lukang in 1765 as a merchant. In 1788, Lin returned to Fujian and decided to retire there, handing the management of Rimao Hang to his third son Lin Wenjun. In 1816, the building was renovated.

== See also ==
- List of tourist attractions in Taiwan
