= Lukang Wen Wu Temple =

Temple in Lukang, Changhua County, Taiwan

- 鹿港文武廟
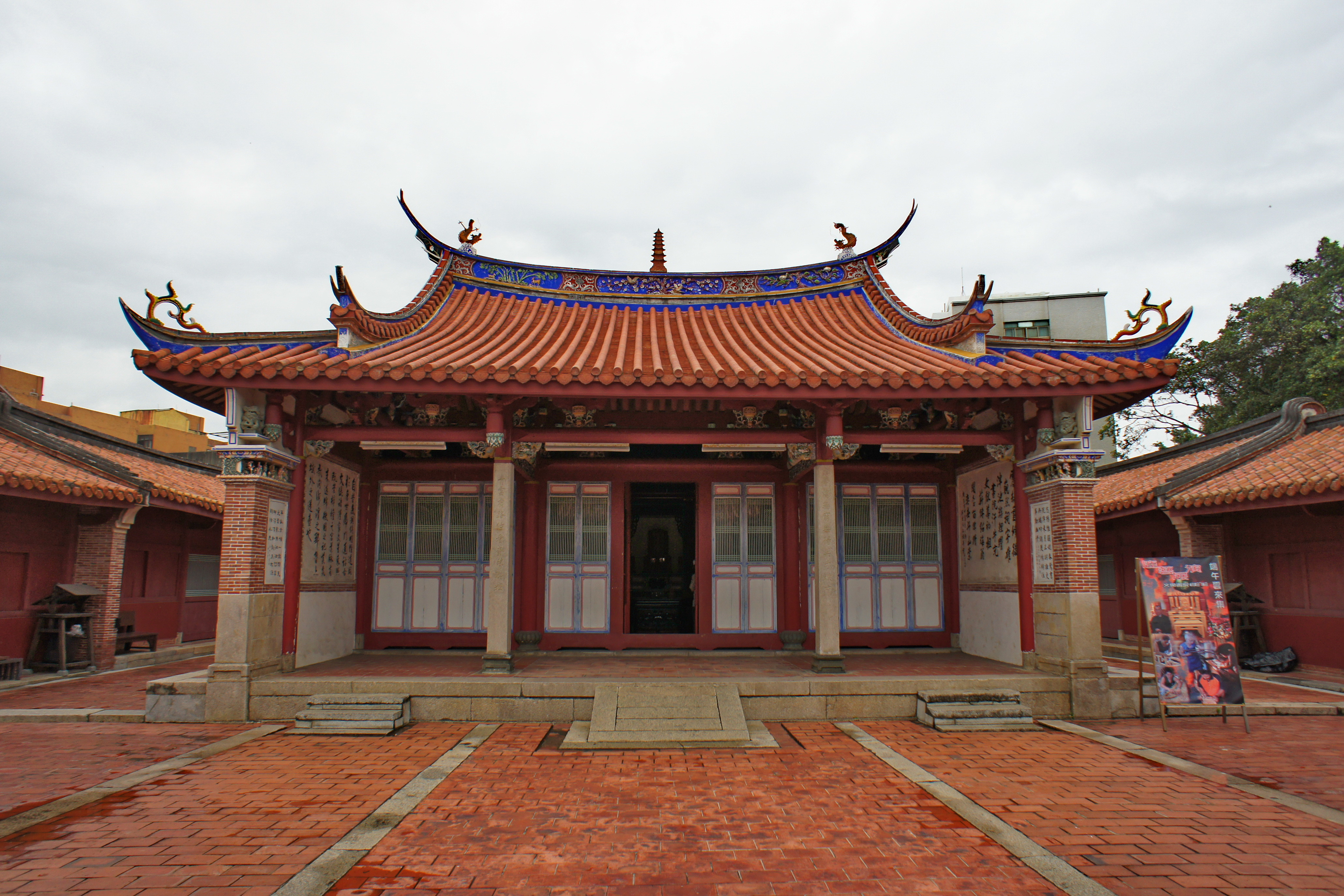

- Location within Changhua County

Location
- Location: Lukang, Changhua County, Taiwan
- Interactive map of Lukang Wen Wu Temple
- Coordinates: 24°02′55.2″N 120°26′18.2″E

Architecture
- Type: temple
- Completed: 1806

The Lukang Wen Wu Temple (traditional Chinese: 鹿港文武廟; simplified Chinese: 鹿港文武庙; pinyin: Lùgǎng Wénwǔ Miào) is a Wen Wu temple in Lukang Township, Changhua County, Taiwan.

== History ==
The temple was established in 1812.

== Architecture ==
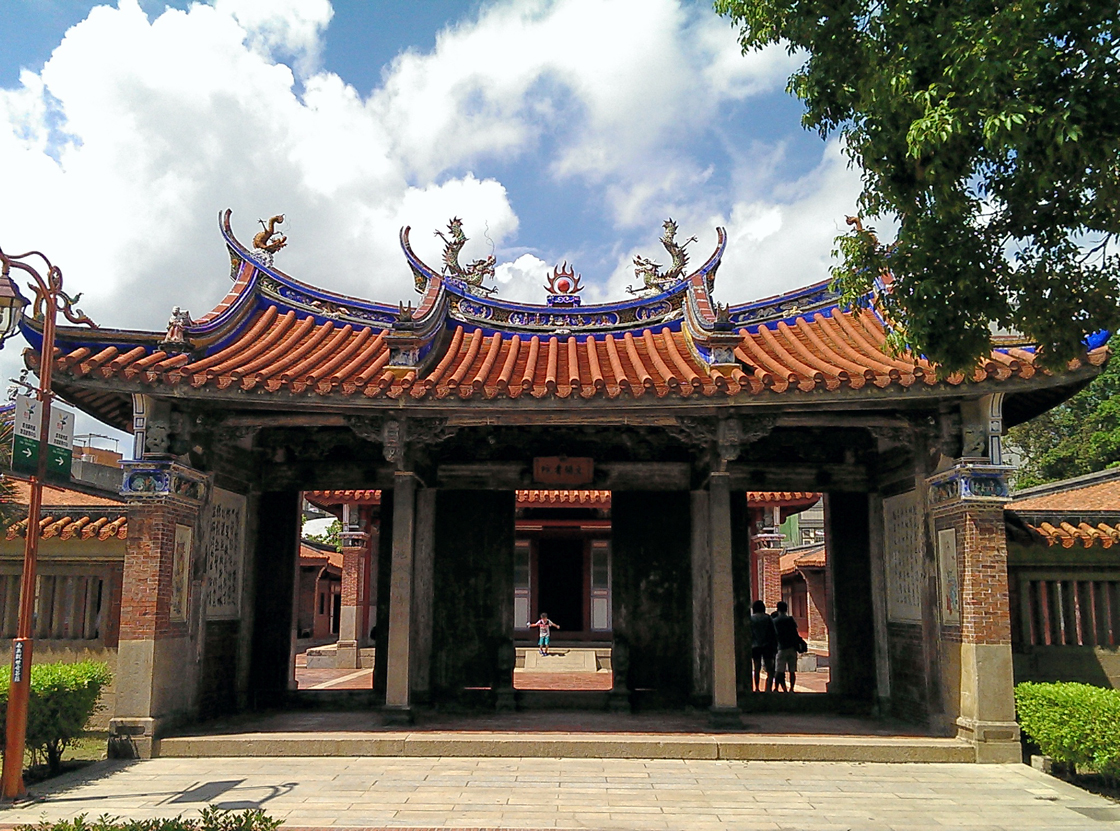
Wenkai Academy

The temple area consists of Martial Temple (武廟), Literature Shrine (文祠) and Wenkai Academy (文開書院).

== Transportation ==
The temple is accessible west of Huatan Station of Taiwan Railway.

== See also ==
- List of tourist attractions in Taiwan
