= Lukang Tianhou Temple =

Temple in Lukang, Changhua County, Taiwan

- 鹿港天后宮
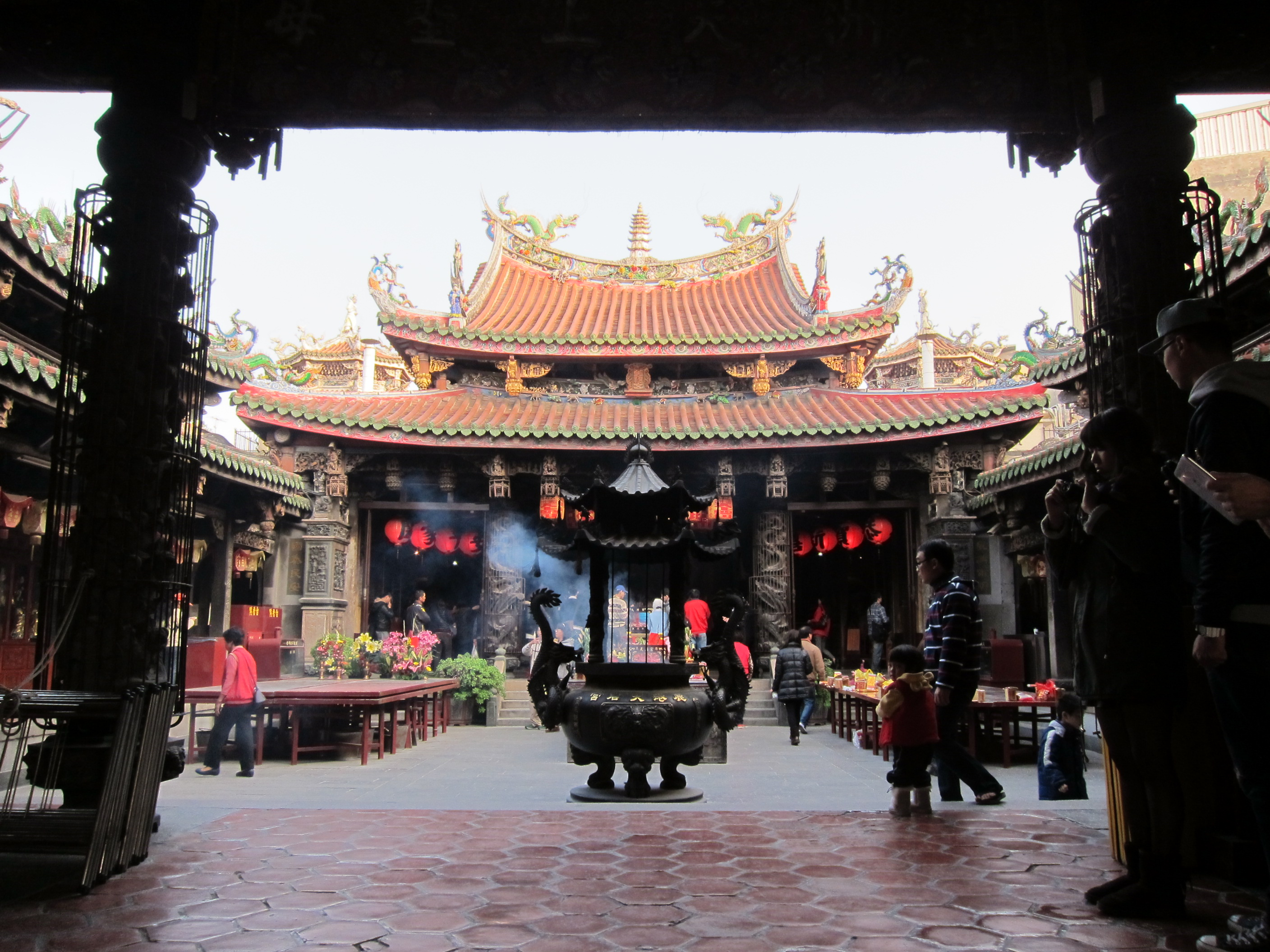

- Taiwan

Location
- Location: Lukang, Changhua County, Taiwan
- Interactive map of Lukang Tianhou Temple
- Coordinates: 24.0593°N 120.4314°E

Architecture
- Type: Mazu Temple
- Completed: 1591

The Lukang Tianhou Temple (Chinese: 鹿港天后宮; pinyin: Lùgǎng Tiānhòu Gōng, alternatively "Tienhou"), also known as the Lukang Mazu Temple, is a Chinese temple dedicated to the Chinese Goddess Mazu, the Goddess of Sea and Patron Deity of fishermen, sailors and any occupations related to sea/ocean. The temple is located at 430 Zhongshan Road in Lukang Township, Changhua County, Taiwan. It is one of the island's most famous and popular Mazu temples.

== History ==
The Goddess Mazu is the deified form of the Lin Moniang from Fujian, traditionally dated AD 960–987. Already popular among the Fujianese immigrants to Taiwan, her cult was particularly patronized by the Qing, who credited her with Shi Lang's 1683 conquest of the island from the Ming-loyalist Zheng clan.

The Lukang Tianhou Temple is sometimes claimed to date back to 1590, though the earliest structure in the area dates to the end of the Ming in the 17th century. The temple was moved to its present location in 1725 after Shi Shibang donated the land.

The temple was repaired in 1815 and renovated in 1874. It was renovated again in 1927 under the direction of Wu Haitong and Wang Shufa, with most of its present structures completed by 1936. The woodwork was done by local artisans and masters from Quanzhou and Chaozhou on the mainland. It was made a 3rd-class historic site in 1985. The Mazu Folk Art Hall was opened in 1992.

== Legends ==
In addition to her many other legends and myths, Mazu is credited with a number of miracles through the Lukang temple particularly. She was said to have answered the prayers of a gathering of 500 people—including the vice-chairman of the provincial legislature, a member of the national assembly, and members of the county council—on her birthday in 1960, ending an ongoing drought with a downpour at 2 am the next morning. Thousands of residents gathered later that morning in appreciation. On 10 May 1963, a bus carrying a group of teachers from Lukang's Haipu School and their relatives went off a wet road over the side of a cliff on the way to Taiwan's east coast. The believers among those saved by the trees which stopped the bus considered that the scene looked the same as Mazu's surname (林) and credited her divine protection. The bus stopped at the Lukang Mazu Temple on the way home and the entire group knelt and thanked her with incense. In April 1972, Lin Tz-hang and his schoolmates from Jing Cheng High School went swimming in the ocean but found themselves miles at sea because of the rising tide. They had prayed to Mazu before they left and again in their extremity and were all saved by fishermen or oyster farmers returning home in the evening.

== Architecture ==
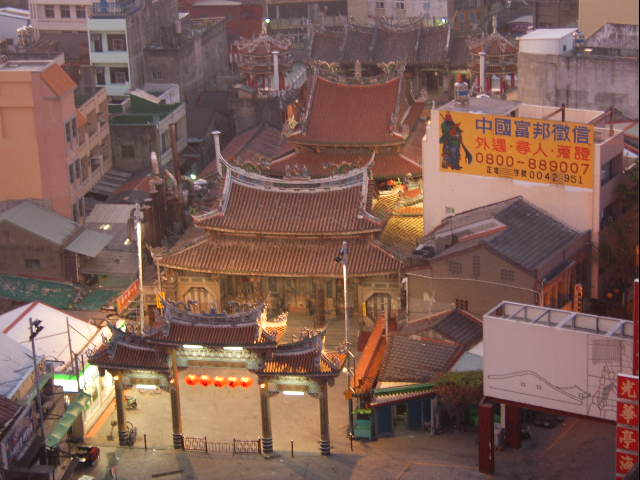
An overview of the temple complex, showing its paifang, front hall, main hall, and rear hall.

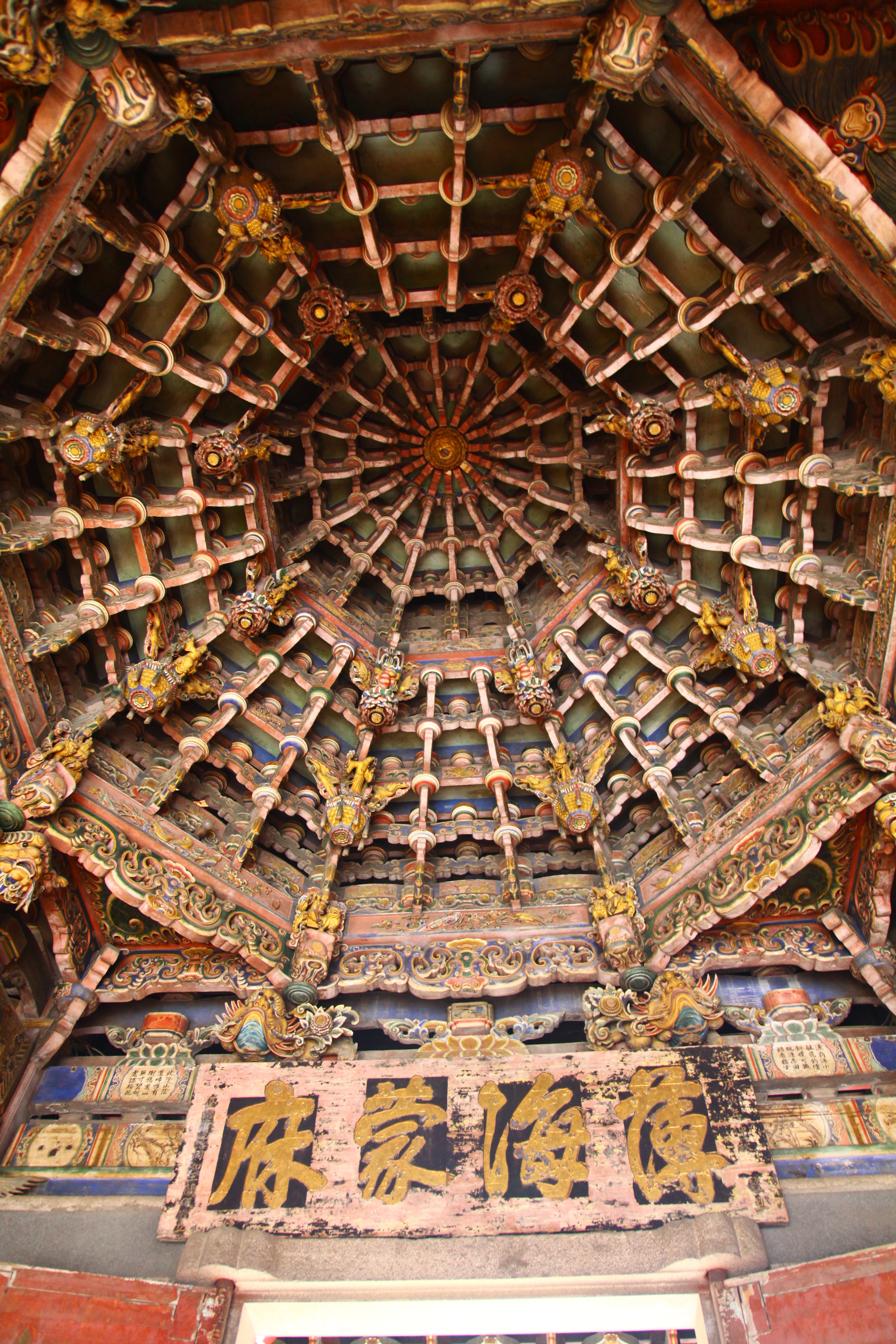
The temple's coffered ceiling

The front or Sanchuan Hall has woodwork notably different from that elsewhere in the complex because it was added from Lukang's city god temple in 1933 when the Japanese began to destroy it as part of an urban replanning. The front hall's coffered ceiling includes sculptures of the Eight Immortals and paintings of the "Four Loves": fishing, woodcutting, planting, and reading. At its apex is a blossoming lotus. Its four corners are protected by stone foo dogs. The ceiling's plaque was written by Wang Lan-pei in 1830 and invokes Mazu's protection (Bo Hai Meng Xiu). It is surmounted by a pair of toads carved by Shi Li, one holding a chrysanthemum in its teeth symbolizing long life and the other holding a camellia symbolizing a long and prosperous spring. Between the pillars are four beasts with dragon heads, fish tails, and bird wings carved by Lee Huan-mei. They are thought to offer the temple protection from fire.

The main hall has three gates. The passages to the temple's east and west wings are guarded by statues of Jing Zhu Gong and Zhu Sheng Niangniang. At the rear entrance of the main hall are statues of a lion and an elephant. Nearby are Shih Jin-fu's wood carvings of the "Four Best Things in Life": stretching, ear-cleaning, nose-picking, and scratching. A similar set done by Huang Lien-ji is located in the main hall itself.

The rear hall was damaged in 1945 by the war. It was renovated in 1959 as part of the millennial celebrations of Mazu's birth. It was renovated again in 1963, adding two doors to the original three and adjusting the balcony to create a larger octagonal shape.

Each of the three halls is fronted by a pair of pillars entwined with sculpted dragons.

The rear of the temple includes a fountain and various historical plaques are preserved on the premises, including three bestowed on the temple by the Yongzheng, Qianlong, and Guangxu Emperors and another from Wang Shaolan, governor of Fujian.

== Statues ==
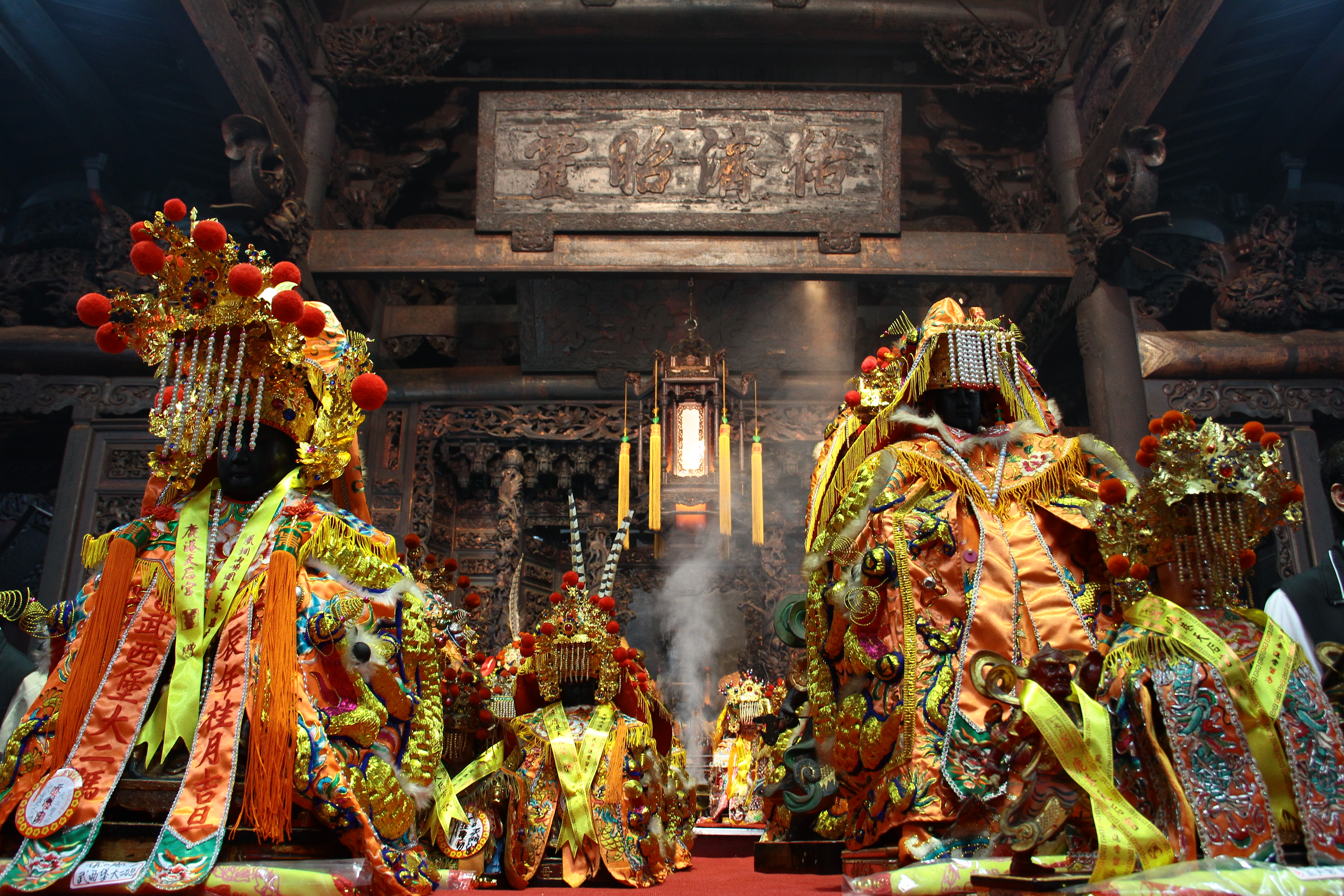
Statues of Deities

The present hardbody main statue of Mazu (Zhen Dian Ma) was sculpted with sand by Shi Li in the 1930s as part of the temple's reconstruction. It is the largest statue of the deity in the temple and is located in the Main Hall. It is flanked by its protectors Qianliyan and Shunfeng'er, carved by Lian Yong-chuan in Quanzhou. Another set of Qianliyan and Shunfeng'er guard the doors of the hall.) The previous softbody statue was kept as a secondary Mazu (Zhen Dian Er Ma). It dates to a Qing-era reconstruction and was built by Lian Lai in Quanzhou.

The Meizhou Kaiji Er Ma, allegedly brought to Lukang by Shi Lang or by Lan Li and a monk from Meizhou, is known as the Dark-Faced Mazu (Heimian Ma) from the coloration produced by offerings of incense over its years of veneration. It is now usually kept in a separate hall. This statue was almost stolen from Lukang's faithful when they took it with them on a pilgrimage to the mainland at the end of the Qing. Prior to the 1922 pilgrimage, the temple president commissioned the Quanzhou carver Lian Yong-chua to produce another similar statue for use on such trips. This is now known as the Jinxiang Ma and is placed in the Main Hall except on occasions when the Meizhou Mazu is brought into that room.

The 12 villages of Xia Shi'er Zhuang have protected their crops with visits by the Guda Ma or Haoshou Ma since at least 1831. It is now kept at the Lukang Tianhou Temple, although the villagers requested the Jinxiang Ma replace it in 1995. The Gold Mazu (Jin Mazu) was built in 2002 from more than 150 kilograms (330 lb) of gold donated by pilgrims. It is also inlaid with diamonds, emeralds, pearls, and rubies and flanked by a pair of angels constructed at the same time. The diminutive 8-inch (200 mm) Chuantou Ma is a specimen of the many statues of Mazu carried by Taiwanese sailors in shrines at the bows of their ships. It is carried to the Houzai Runzhe Temple during the Shisan Wangye Festival.

The rear hall also has statues of the Jade Emperor and the Sanguan Dadi.

== Gallery ==
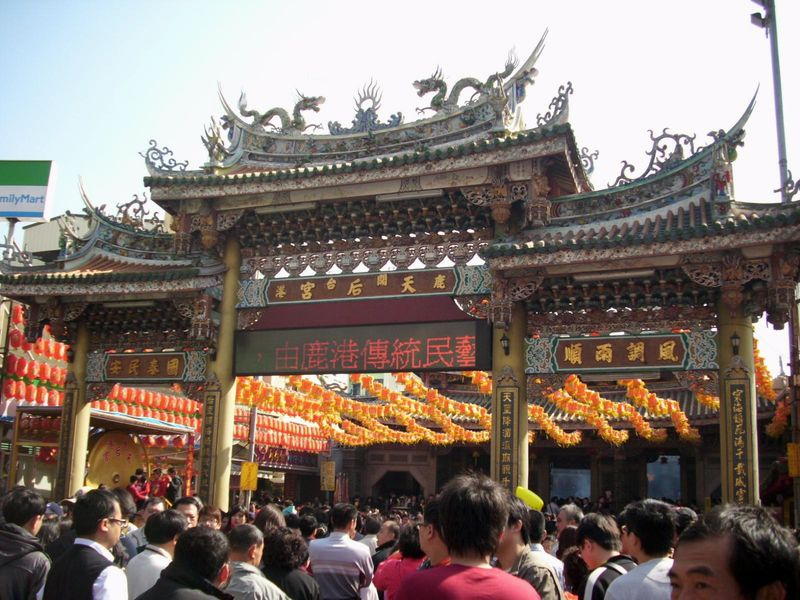
The paifang

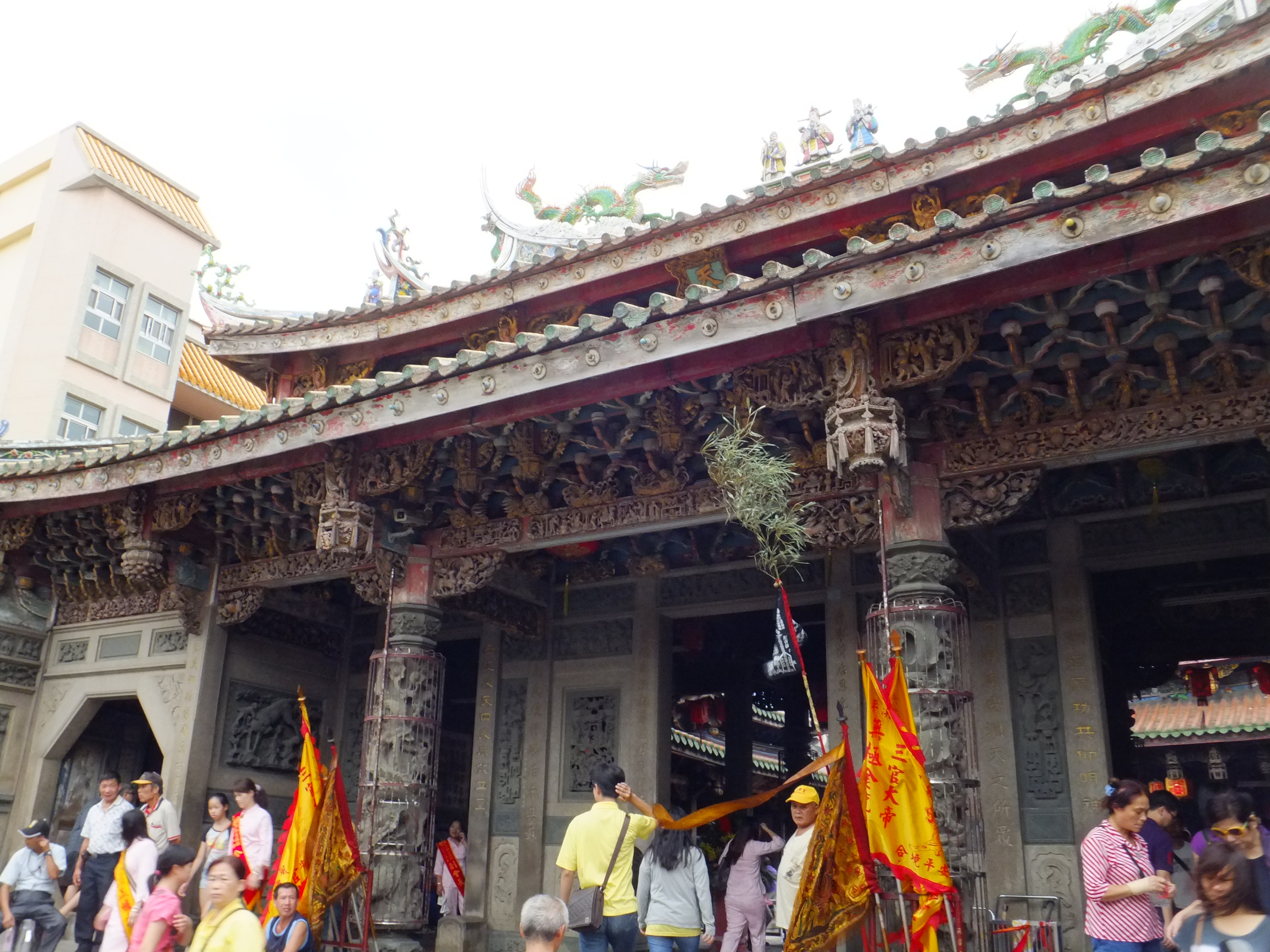
Front hall entrance

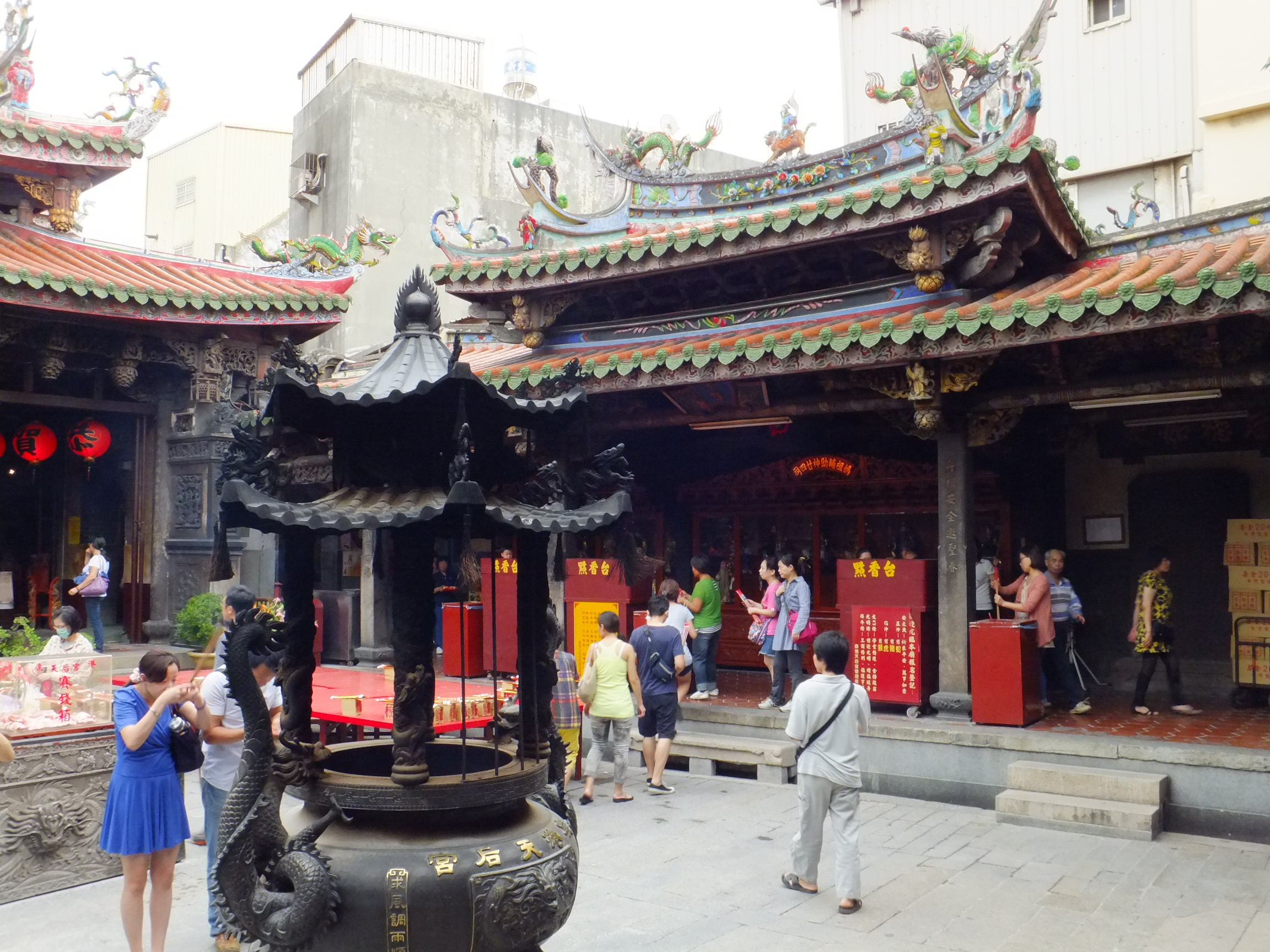
One of the wings

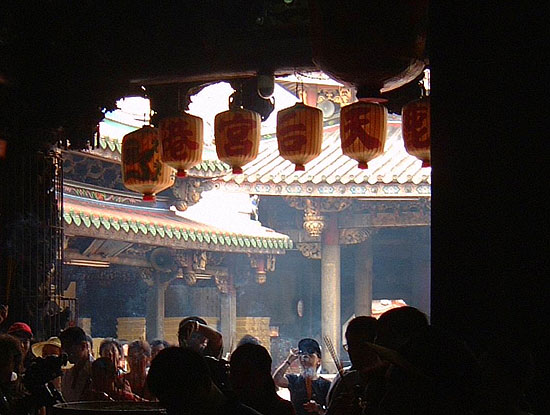
The courtyard

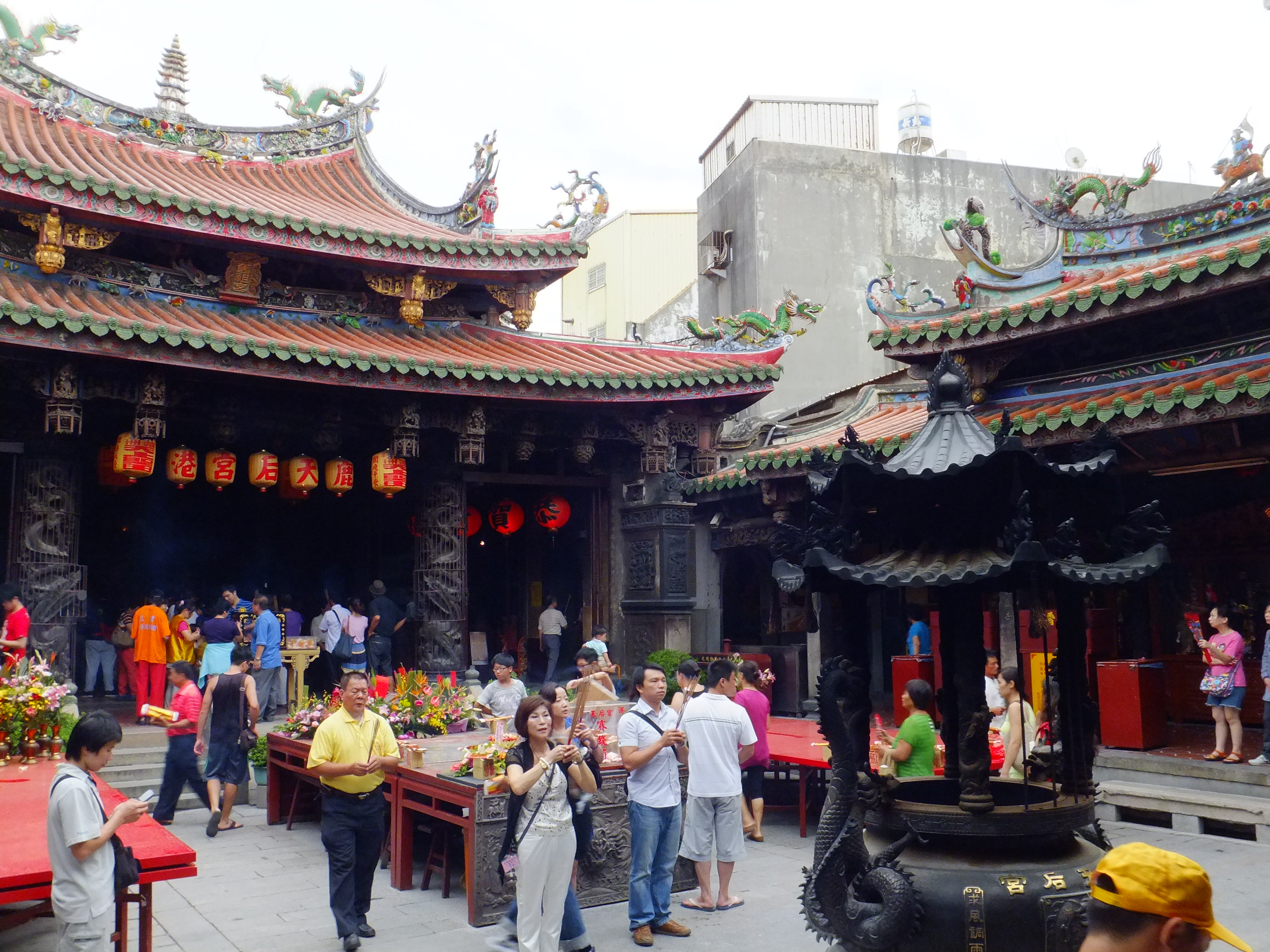
Main hall

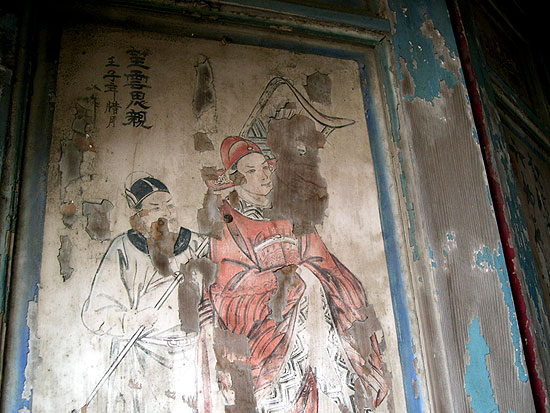
A wall painting

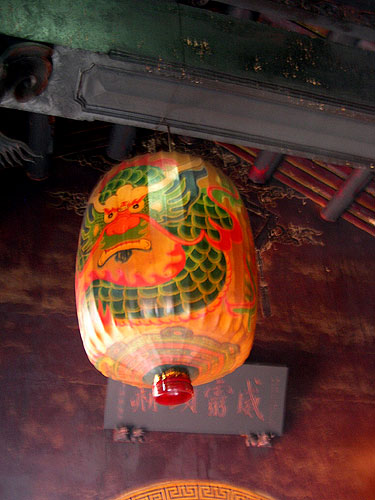
A detail of the temple's lanterns

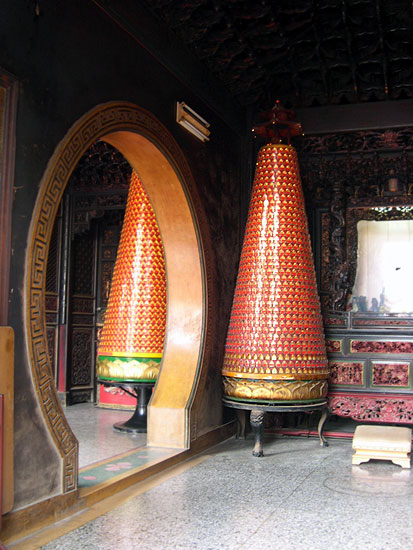
Stacks of small buddhas
