= Lukang =

Lukang 鹿港鎮 Rokkō; Luchiang; Lugang
- Urban township
- Lukang Township
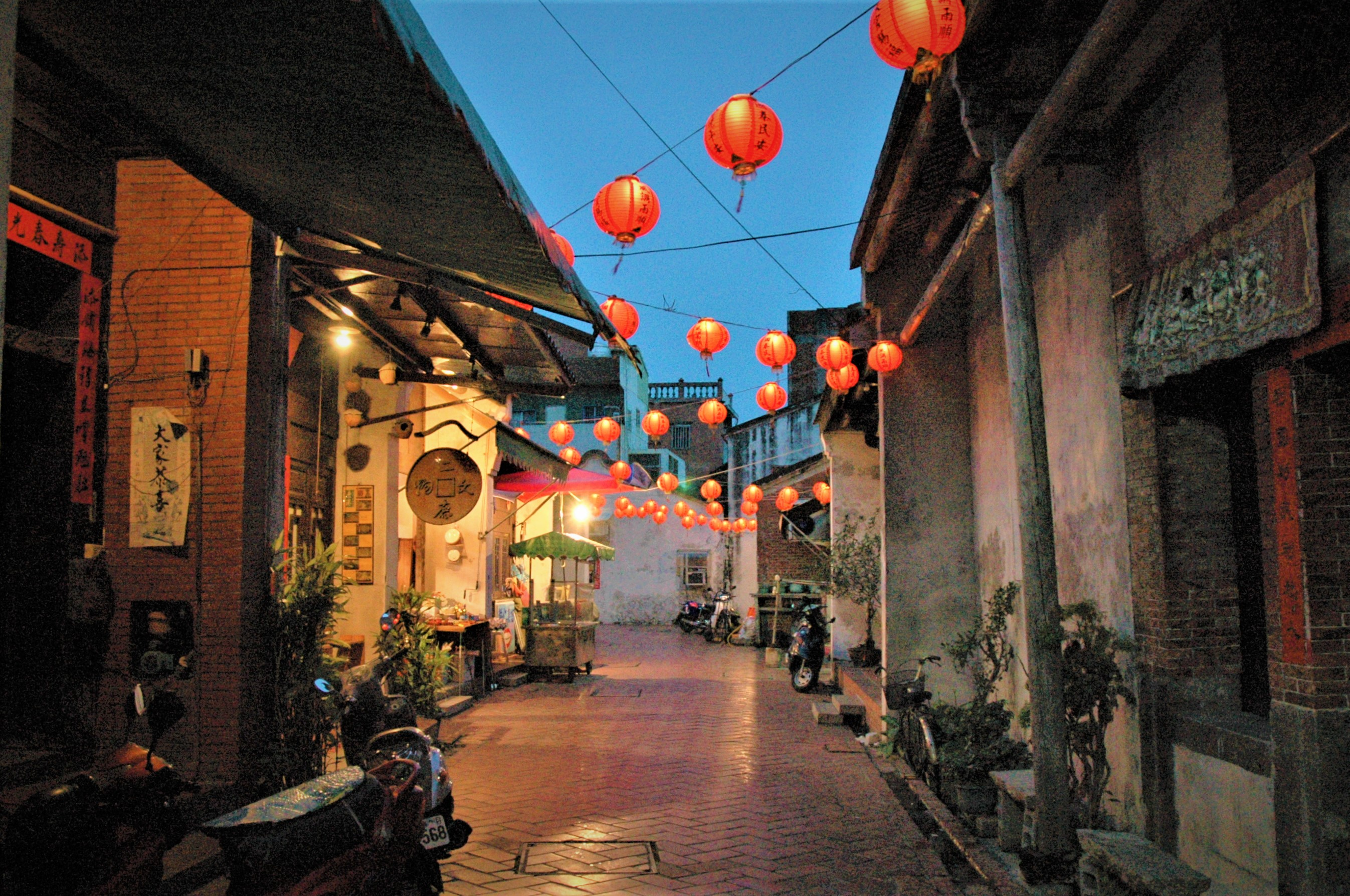
- An alley in the old town of Lukang

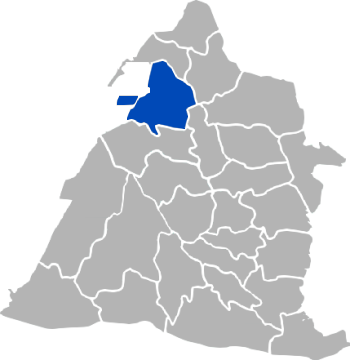
- Coordinates: 24°03′N 120°26′E
- Country: Taiwan
- County: Changhua County

Government
  - Type: Urban township
  - Mayor: Xu Zhihong (許志宏)

Area
  - Total: 71.802 km^{2} (27.723 sq mi)

Population (January 2023)
  - Total: 85,423
  - Density: 1,189.7/km^{2} (3,081.3/sq mi)

Gender
  - Male: 44,101
  - Female: 42,717
- Website: www.lukang.gov.tw/English/

Lukang Township
- Traditional Chinese: 鹿港鎮
- Literal meaning: Deer Harbor
Transcriptions
Standard Mandarin
- Hanyu Pinyin: Lùgǎng Zhèn
- Bopomofo: ㄌㄨˋㄍㄤˇㄓㄣˋ
- Gwoyeu Romatzyh: Luhgaang Jenn
- Wade–Giles: Lu⁴-kang³ Chên⁴
- Tongyong Pinyin: Lùgǎng Jhèn
- MPS2: Lùgǎng Jèn
- IPA: [lû.kàŋ ʈʂə̂n]
Hakka
- Pha̍k-fa-sṳ: Lu̍k-kóng-chṳ́n
Southern Min
- Hokkien POJ: Lo̍k-káng-tìn
- Tâi-lô: Lo̍k-káng-tìn

Lukang, formerly romanized as Lugang and also known by other names, is an urban township in northwestern Changhua County, Taiwan. The township is on the west coast of Taiwan, facing the Taiwan Strait. Lukang was an important sea port in the 18th century and 19th century. It was the most populous city in central Taiwan until the early 20th century. In March 2012, it was named one of the Top 10 Small Tourist Towns by the Tourism Bureau of Taiwan.

== Name ==
The township's name, which means "Deer Port", came from its deerskin trade during the Dutch period. Its old Taiwanese name was Lok-a-kang (Chinese: 鹿仔港; Pe̍h-ōe-jī: Lo̍k-á-káng) and its shortened version is seen in English texts and maps as variants such as Lok-kang, Lokang and Lo-kiang.

In 2011, the Ministry of Interior decided to keep the historical Wade-Giles spelling "Lukang" and abandon the change to the Pinyin spelling "Lugang" consistent with the switch to Tongyong Pinyin in 2002 and later Hanyu Pinyin 2009.

== History ==
An important trading port during Lukang's heyday from 1785 to 1845, Lukang's population reached 20,000. Lukang was Taiwan's second largest city after Tainan and was larger than Bangka (now a district of Taipei), then the island's third-largest city. The rice industry brought great wealth to the city. During the late 1800s the most prominent families in Lukang were the Huang and Koo clans.

The subsequent silting of the harbor and the city's refusal to allow railroads to pass through the city led to losses in trade in commerce, which, in turn led to Lukang's decline relative to other cities, which were experiencing considerable urbanization and population growth. This same decline, however, averted the modernization processes that demolished historical buildings in Tainan and Taipei, leaving Lukang preserved as it was in the past.

During the period of Japanese rule, the city was Taiwan's fifth most populous city, with a population of 19,805 according to the December 1904 census. The Hoklo people in the area were predominantly of Xiamen and Quanzhou origin, thereby speaking the Quanzhou dialect of Hokkien. Nanguan music is highly popular in Lukang and originates from Quanzhou.

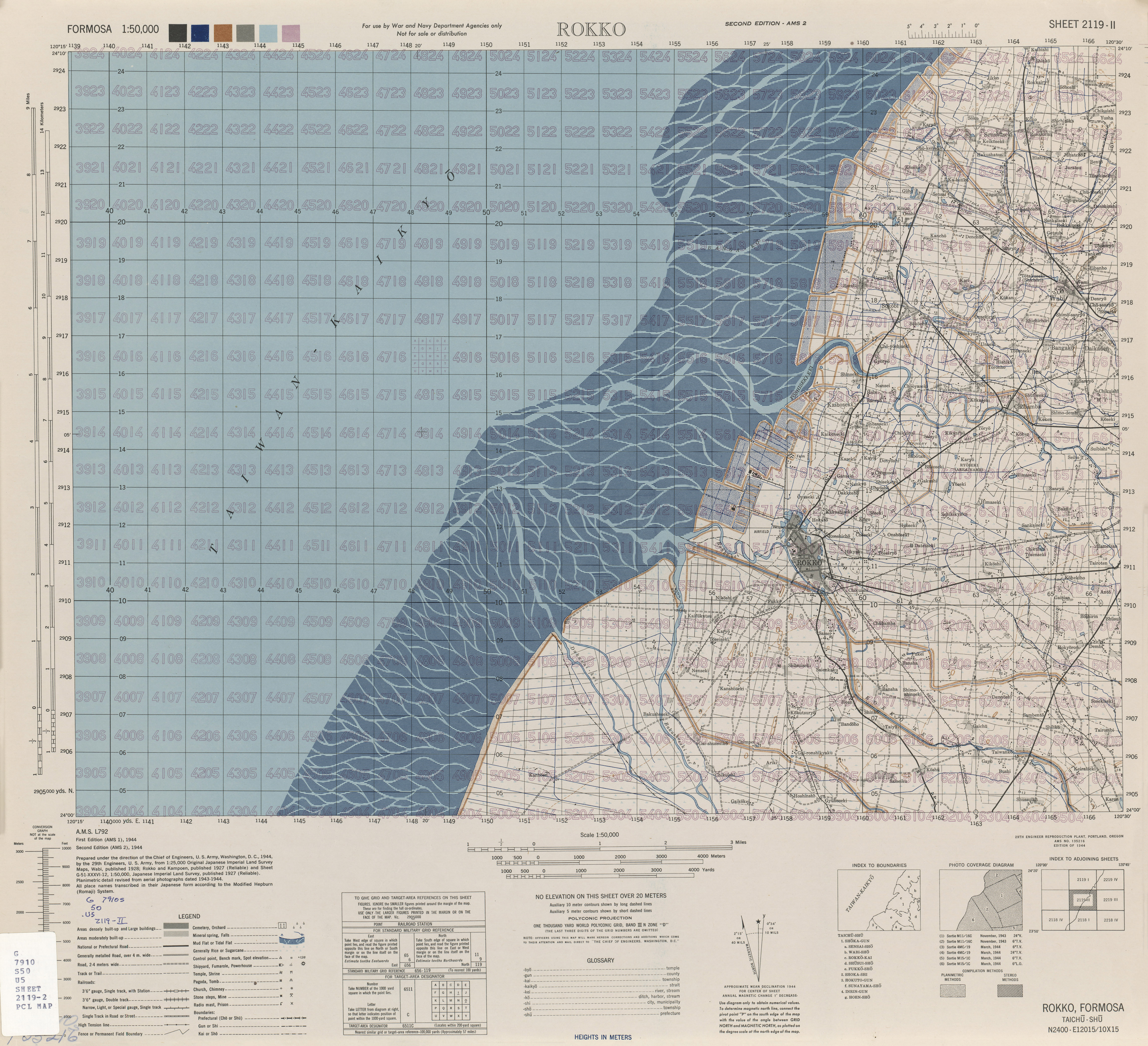
Map of Lukang (labeled as ROKKŌ) and surrounding area (1944)

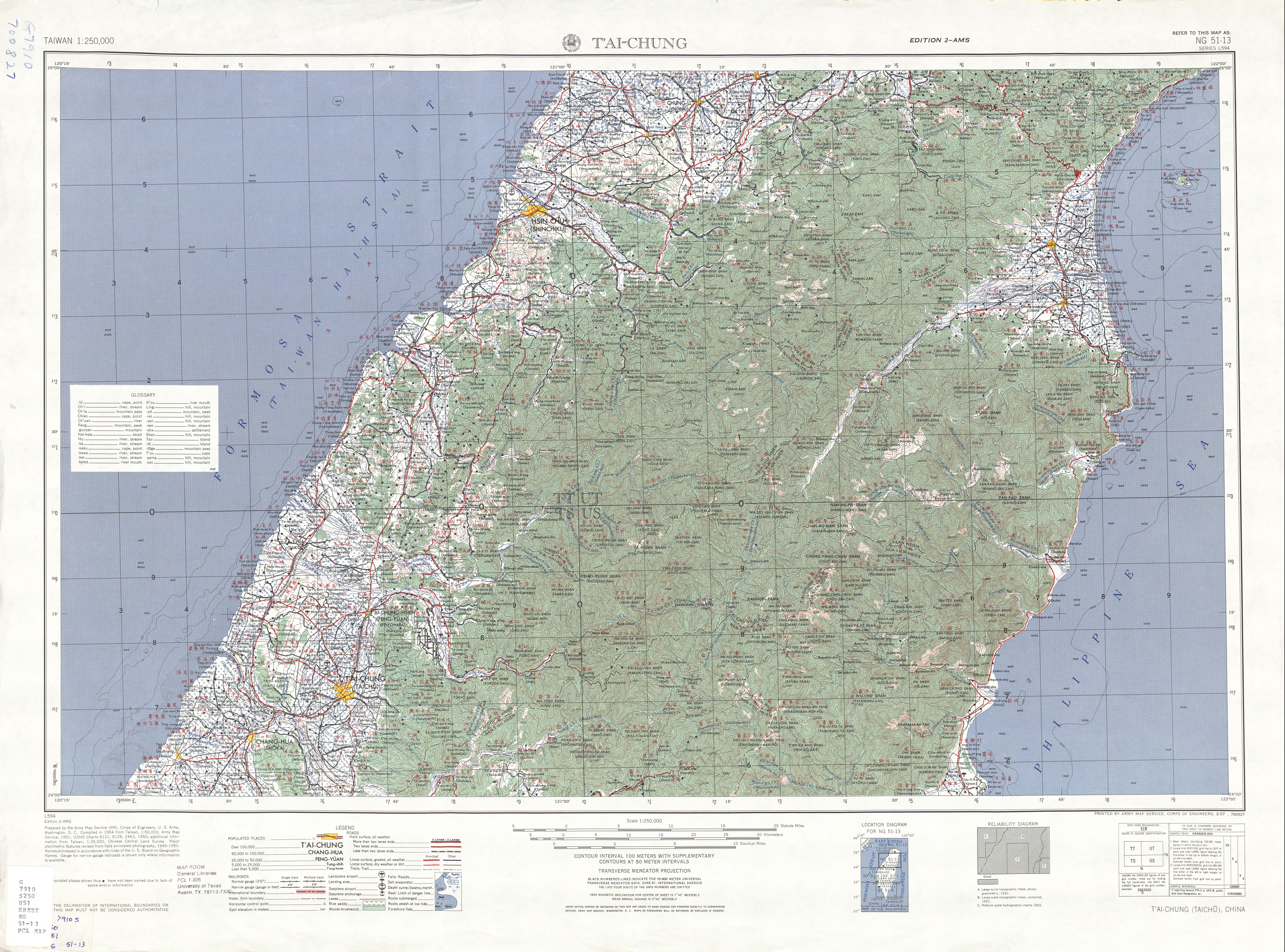
Map including Lukang (labeled as Lu-chiang (Rokko) 鹿港) (1954)

In 1920, Lukang was governed as Rokkō Town (鹿港街) under Shōka District of Taichū Prefecture.

== Overview ==
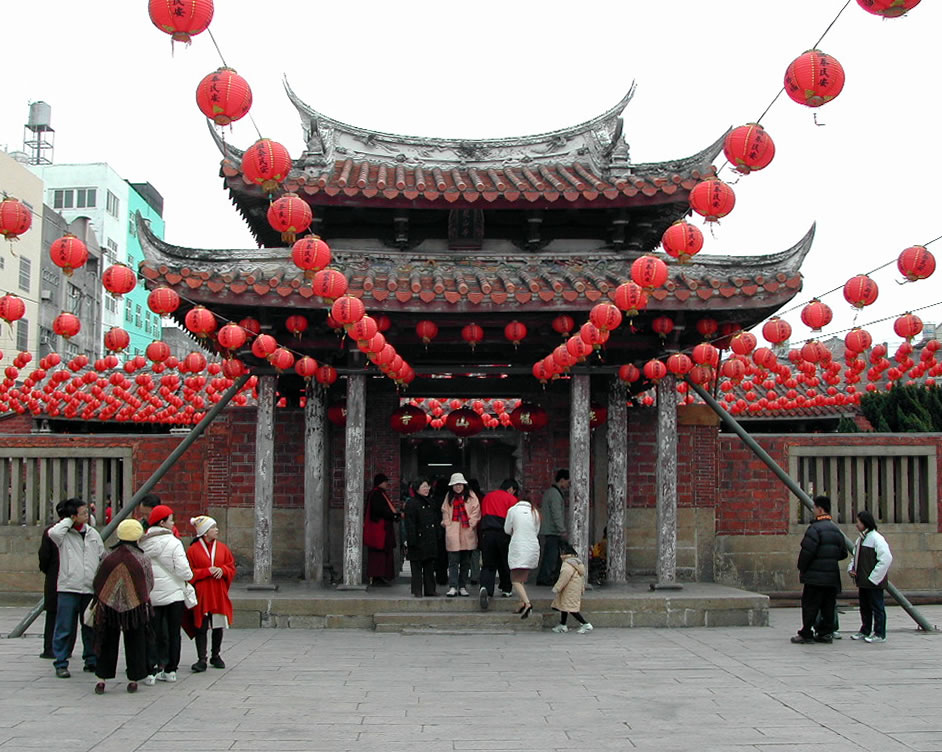
The Lukang Longshan Temple.

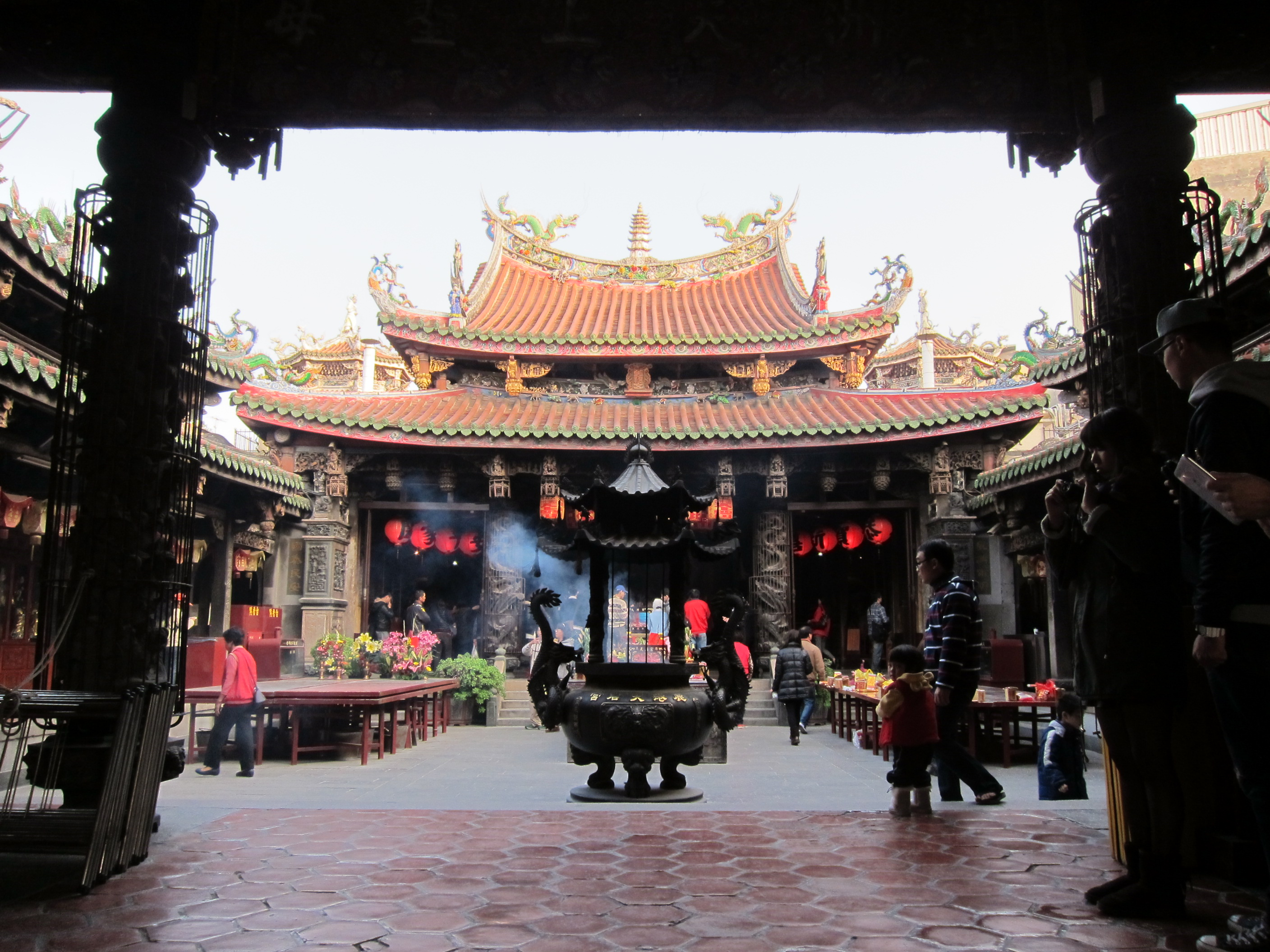
Lukang Mazu Temple

There are many old temples in Lukang, such as Longshan Temple and Matzu Temple. The city boasts over 200 temples dedicated to a wide variety of folk deities. The town is also the origin of the terms "ē-káng" (下港) and "téng-káng" (頂港) used respectively to refer to southern Taiwan and northern Taiwan; the literal meanings of the terms are "below the harbor" and "above the harbor".

The Yu Jen Jai (玉珍齋) cakes are famous local specialties, as well as Lukang's Ox Tongue Cakes (牛舌餅) and oyster pancakes. Lukang was host of the 2012 Taiwan Lantern Festival, beating out six other contenders.

Lukang encompasses 39.46 square kilometers (15.24 sq mi) with a population of 85,423, including 43,199 males and 42,224 females as of January 2023.

== Administrative divisions ==
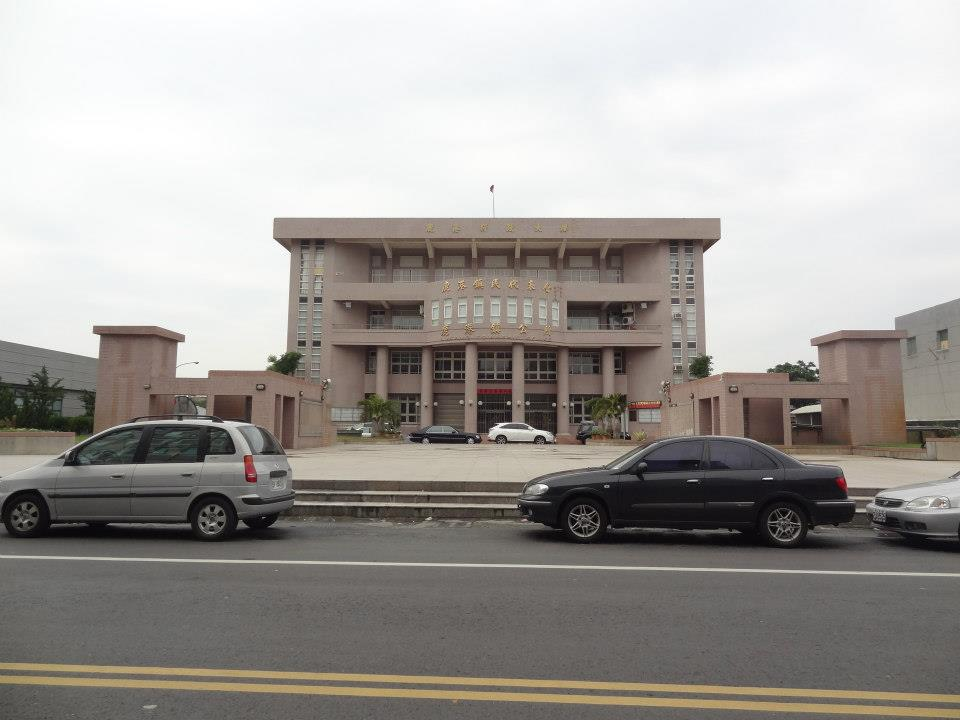
Lukang Township Office

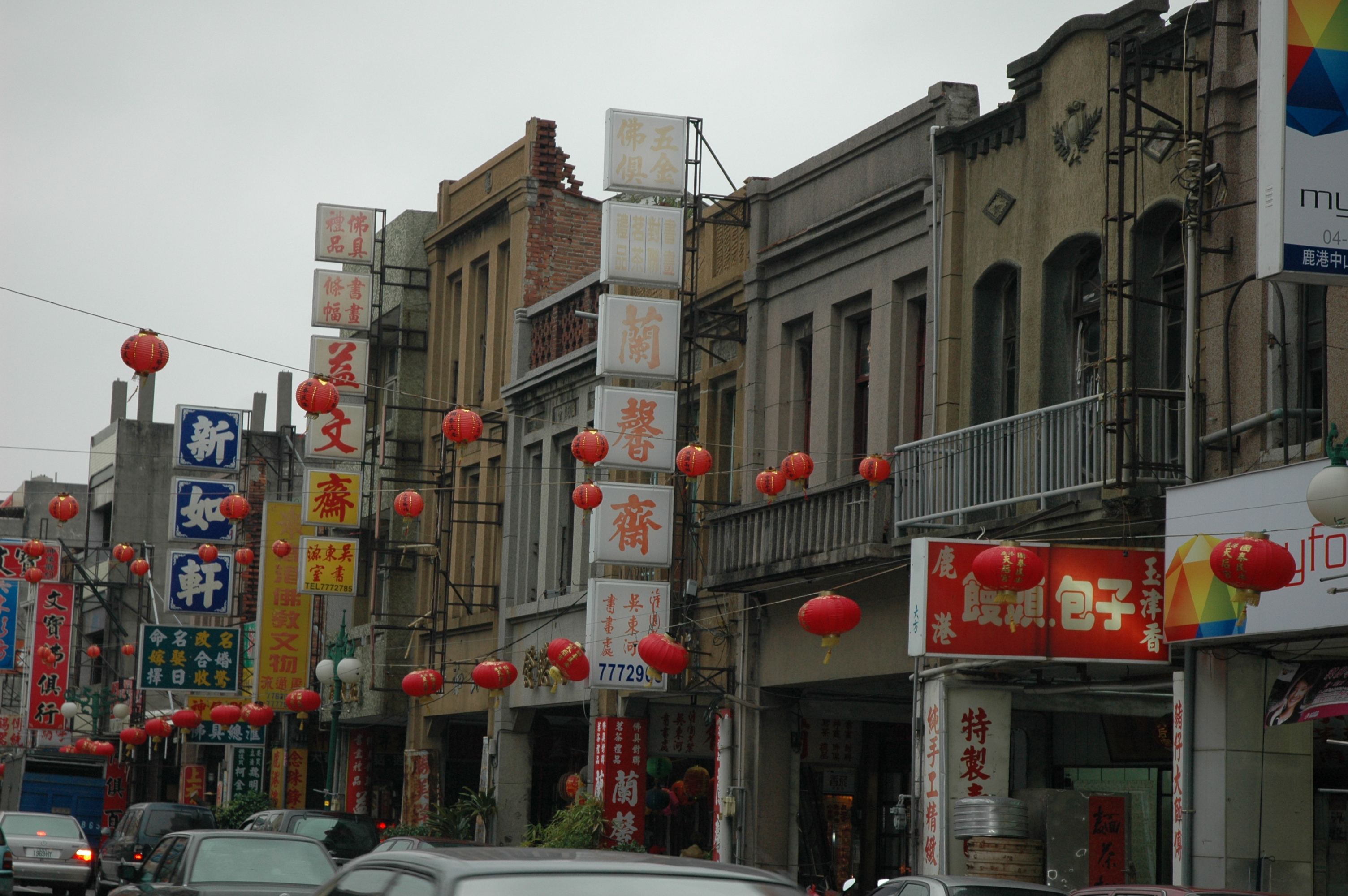
Street view in Lukang

The township comprises 29 villages, which are Dayou, Zhongxing, Luojin, Shunxing, Pulun, Xingong, Yushun, Tungshi, Guocuo, Yongan, Jingfu, Taixing, Zhangxing, Xinghua, Longshan, Caiyuan, Jiewei, Zhaoan, Haipu, Yangcuo, Caozhong, Tounan, Shanlun, Dingpan, Toulun, Gouqi, Liaocuo, Tungqi and Dingcuo.

== Infrastructure ==
- Hsingneng Power Plant
- Hsingyuan Power Plant

== Tourist attractions ==
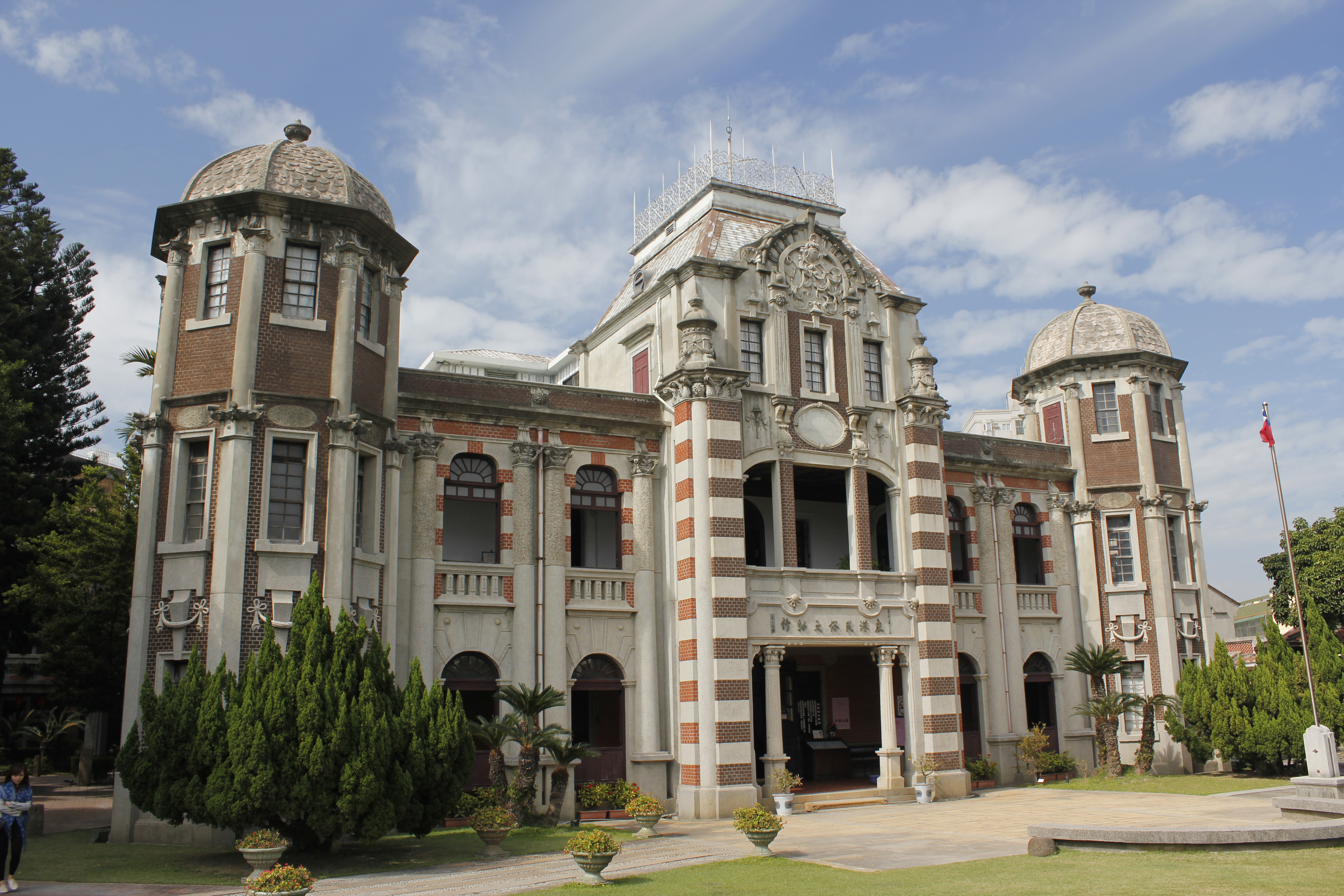
Lukang Folk Arts Museum, the former Koo's family mansion (see Koo Hsien-jung)

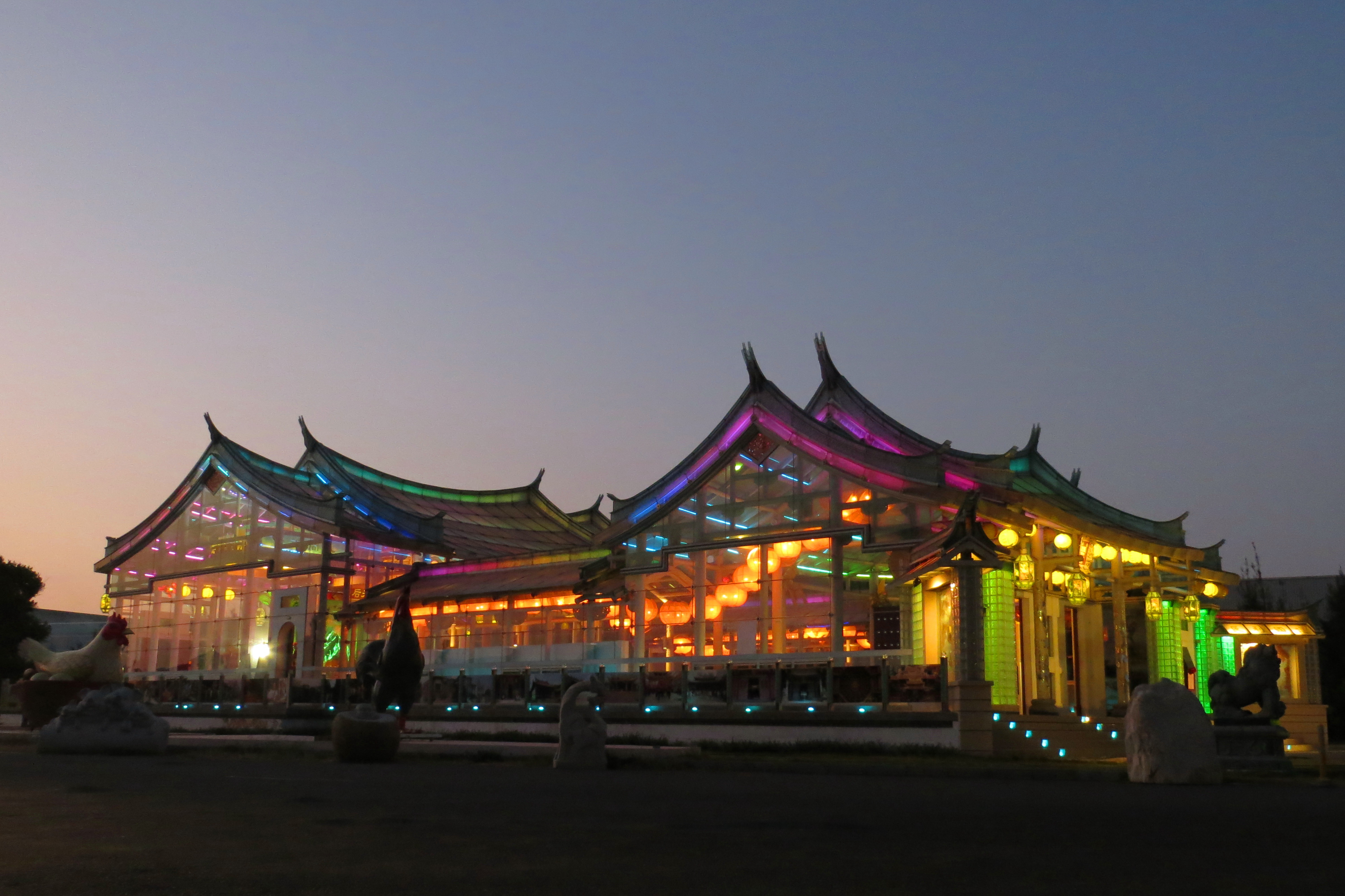
The Glass Mazu Temple at Taiwan Glass Gallery in Lukang

- BRAND'S Health Museum
- Chang Bin Show-Chwan Health Mall
- Eight Wonders
- Lukang Ai Gate
- Lukang Artist Village
- Lukang Culture Center
- Lukang Folk Arts Museum
- Lukang Kinmen Hall
- Lukang Longshan Temple
- Lukang Rimao Hang
- Lukang Tianhou Temple
- Lukang Wen Wu Temple
- No Heaven Street
- Taiwan Glass Gallery & Glass Temple

== In popular culture ==
The town was referenced in the 1982 song "Lukang, The Small Town" (鹿港小鎮) by Lo Ta-yu.

== Notable natives ==
- Chao Shou-po, politician, educator, civic activist and lawyer
- Koo Hsien-jung, former businessperson
- Koo Chen-fu, businessman, diplomat
- Koo Kwang-ming, politician
- Stan Shih, Co-founder & Honorary Chairman of Acer Inc.
- Li Ang, writer
- Shi Shuqing, writer

== Climate ==
Climate data for Lukang (2012–2023 normals, extremes 2012–present)
Month	Jan	Feb	Mar	Apr	May	Jun	Jul	Aug	Sep	Oct	Nov	Dec	Year
Record high °C (°F)	30.1 (86.2)	32.7 (90.9)	32.3 (90.1)	34.3 (93.7)	34.8 (94.6)	36.4 (97.5)	39.1 (102.4)	37.5 (99.5)	37.0 (98.6)	35.2 (95.4)	33.3 (91.9)	30.5 (86.9)	39.1 (102.4)
Mean daily maximum °C (°F)	20.4 (68.7)	21.0 (69.8)	24.3 (75.7)	27.4 (81.3)	30.3 (86.5)	32.3 (90.1)	33.4 (92.1)	33.0 (91.4)	32.6 (90.7)	29.8 (85.6)	26.7 (80.1)	22.2 (72.0)	27.8 (82.0)
Daily mean °C (°F)	16.7 (62.1)	16.9 (62.4)	19.7 (67.5)	23.2 (73.8)	26.3 (79.3)	28.4 (83.1)	29.4 (84.9)	28.9 (84.0)	28.2 (82.8)	25.4 (77.7)	22.6 (72.7)	18.6 (65.5)	23.7 (74.7)
Mean daily minimum °C (°F)	13.9 (57.0)	14.1 (57.4)	16.5 (61.7)	19.9 (67.8)	23.3 (73.9)	25.5 (77.9)	26.3 (79.3)	25.9 (78.6)	25.0 (77.0)	22.3 (72.1)	19.6 (67.3)	15.7 (60.3)	20.7 (69.2)
Record low °C (°F)	4.7 (40.5)	6.1 (43.0)	10.0 (50.0)	11.0 (51.8)	15.4 (59.7)	22.5 (72.5)	22.5 (72.5)	23.5 (74.3)	20.7 (69.3)	14.6 (58.3)	7.6 (45.7)	7.5 (45.5)	4.7 (40.5)
Average precipitation mm (inches)	25.5 (1.00)	43.2 (1.70)	68.8 (2.71)	98.4 (3.87)	181.9 (7.16)	217.7 (8.57)	183.8 (7.24)	206.7 (8.14)	93.1 (3.67)	18.1 (0.71)	19.4 (0.76)	24.7 (0.97)	1,181.3 (46.5)
Average precipitation days	4.5	5.9	7.6	8.3	9.4	10.6	8.4	10.5	5.4	1.9	2.9	3.4	78.8
Average relative humidity (%)	82.5	84.6	84.3	84.0	86.3	86.2	82.7	86.1	82.8	79.2	82.6	80.2	83.5
Source 1: Central Weather Administration
Source 2: Atmospheric Science Research and Application Databank (precipitation 1993–2020, precipitation days and humidity 2000–2013)
