= Two Brothers Roundhouse =

- Chicago, Burlington, & Quincy Roundhouse and Locomotive Shop
- U.S. National Register of Historic Places
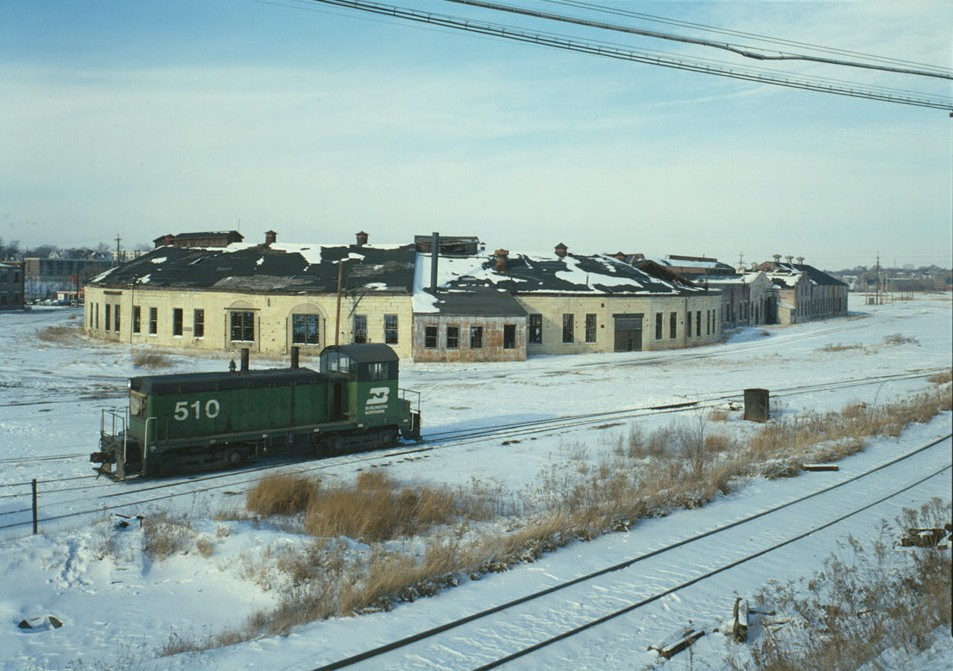
- America's Historical Roundhouse served the Chicago, Burlington & Quincy Railroad from 1856 to 1974

- Location within Illinois Location within the United States
- Location: Broadway and Spring Streets; Aurora, Illinois
- Coordinates: 41°45′39″N 88°18′30″W
- Built: 1856
- Architect: Levi Hull Waterhouse
- NRHP reference No.: 78001154
- Added to NRHP: February 16, 1978

The Two Brothers Roundhouse, formerly the Walter Payton Roundhouse, America's Historical Roundhouse, and Chicago, Burlington, & Quincy Roundhouse and Locomotive Shop is a historic building converted to a restaurant in Aurora, Illinois. It was originally constructed in 1856 as a roundhouse for the Chicago & Aurora Railroad (later Chicago, Burlington & Quincy Railroad) and served in this capacity until 1974. It was abandoned until 1995, when a group of investors led by Walter Payton purchased it and converted the building to an entertainment complex. Its most recent tenant is Two Brothers Brewing. The building is the oldest limestone roundhouse in the United States and is listed on the National Register of Historic Places.

== History ==
The roundhouse was constructed in 1856 to serve Aurora on the Chicago & Aurora Railroad (C&A). The C&A built its own maintenance shops to facilitate further expansion of the rail system westward. The shops were also capable of producing new equipment for the rolling stock. The roundhouse was designed by Levi Hull Waterhouse, who designed several important structures in the Aurora vicinity. The walls of the structure were constructed with locally quarried limestone from Batavia, Illinois. There were originally twenty-two stalls in the roundhouse, with an additional eight added three years after completion. Ten stalls were added at an unknown later date. A small shop was also present in the roundhouse which catered to locomotive engines.

The C&A merged with the Chicago, Burlington & Quincy Railroad in 1868, which became the most trafficked railroad in Illinois by 1870. In the 1930s, the focus of the complex shifted to the new Zephyr line of diesel engines. It also constructed many passenger cars, including Pullman cars and the very first dome car. As the automobile increased in usage in the mid-20th century, rail traffic declined. The roundhouse and shops closed in 1974; most of the other shops in the district were demolished soon after.

The structure was abandoned for twenty-one years. It was added to the National Register of Historic Places on February 16, 1978. In May 1988, the American Society of Mechanical Engineers recognized the roundhouse as a landmark in mechanical engineering for its "innovative railroad yard machine shop." In 1995, the Aurora City Council voted to allow an investment group led by former Chicago Bears running back Walter Payton to purchase the building. The building re-opened in 1996 and hosted a brewpub, restaurant, museum, and open-air pavilion. Among the artifacts in the museum is Payton's championship ring from Super Bowl XX. The complex received a National Preservation Award on October 22, 1999, only days before Payton's death.

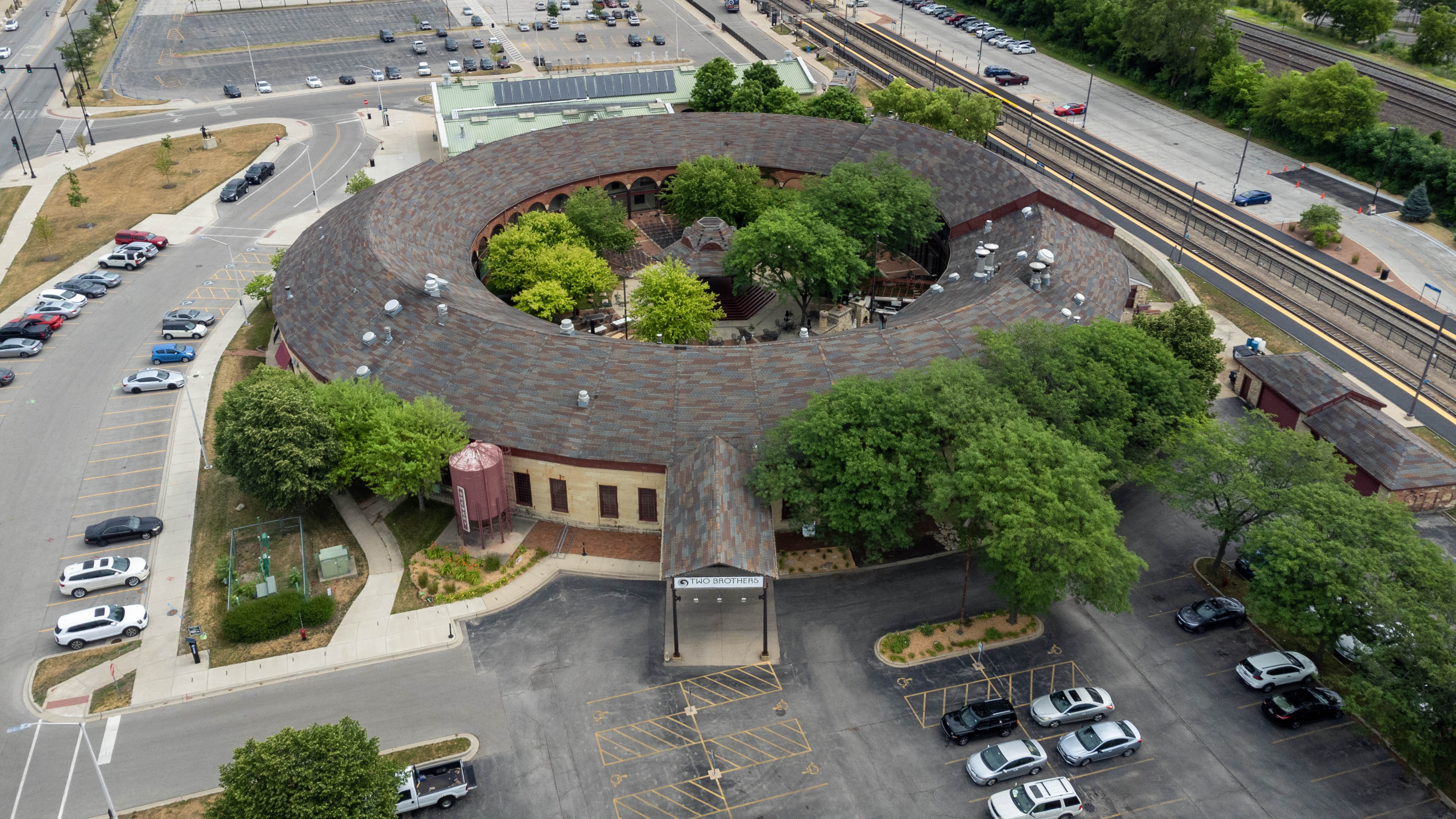
Two Brothers Roundhouse in 2022.

On May 2, 2011 Two Brothers Brewing Company announced via Facebook and Twitter that they had acquired America's Historical Roundhouse in Aurora Illinois. They opened a restaurant on June 18, 2011, featuring ten of their locally available beers on tap plus an additional two that are exclusive to the establishment.

== Architecture ==
The roundhouse portion of the building complex is 264 feet (80 m) long with a local limestone exterior and an iron loggia interior. The roundhouse is actually a tetracontagon (40 sides). A steel truss structure supports wood-sheathed steel rafters, covered on the exterior by tar paper. The locomotive shop is attached to the north side and is 50 by 180 feet (15 m × 55 m) with two 16-foot (4.9 m) stories.
