= Esquimalt and Nanaimo Railway Roundhouse =

Coordinates: 48°25′47.74″N 123°22′52.42″W

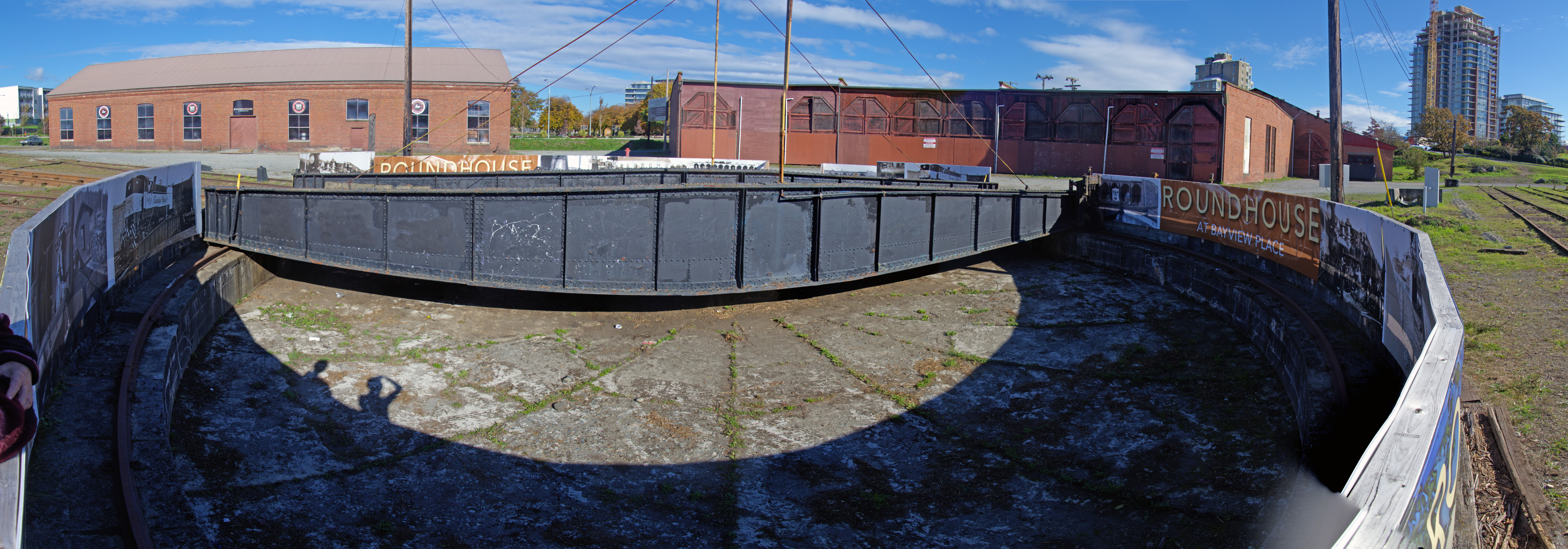
Esquimalt & Nanaimo turntable and roundhouse. Advertising for "Roundhouse at Bayview Place" future residential development in 2013

Esquimalt and Nanaimo Railway Roundhouse in Victoria, British Columbia, Canada, was completed in 1913 and designated a National Historic Site of Canada in 1992. The roundhouse has been virtually unchanged since its construction. It is surrounded by railway shops and outbuildings, representative of the steam railway era in Canada, once serving its namesake railway.

== See also ==
- Island Rail Corridor
- List of historic places in Victoria, British Columbia
- Railway turntable
