= Changhua Roundhouse =

Railway roundhouse in Changhua City, Changhua County, Taiwan

- 彰化扇形車庫 (Chinese)
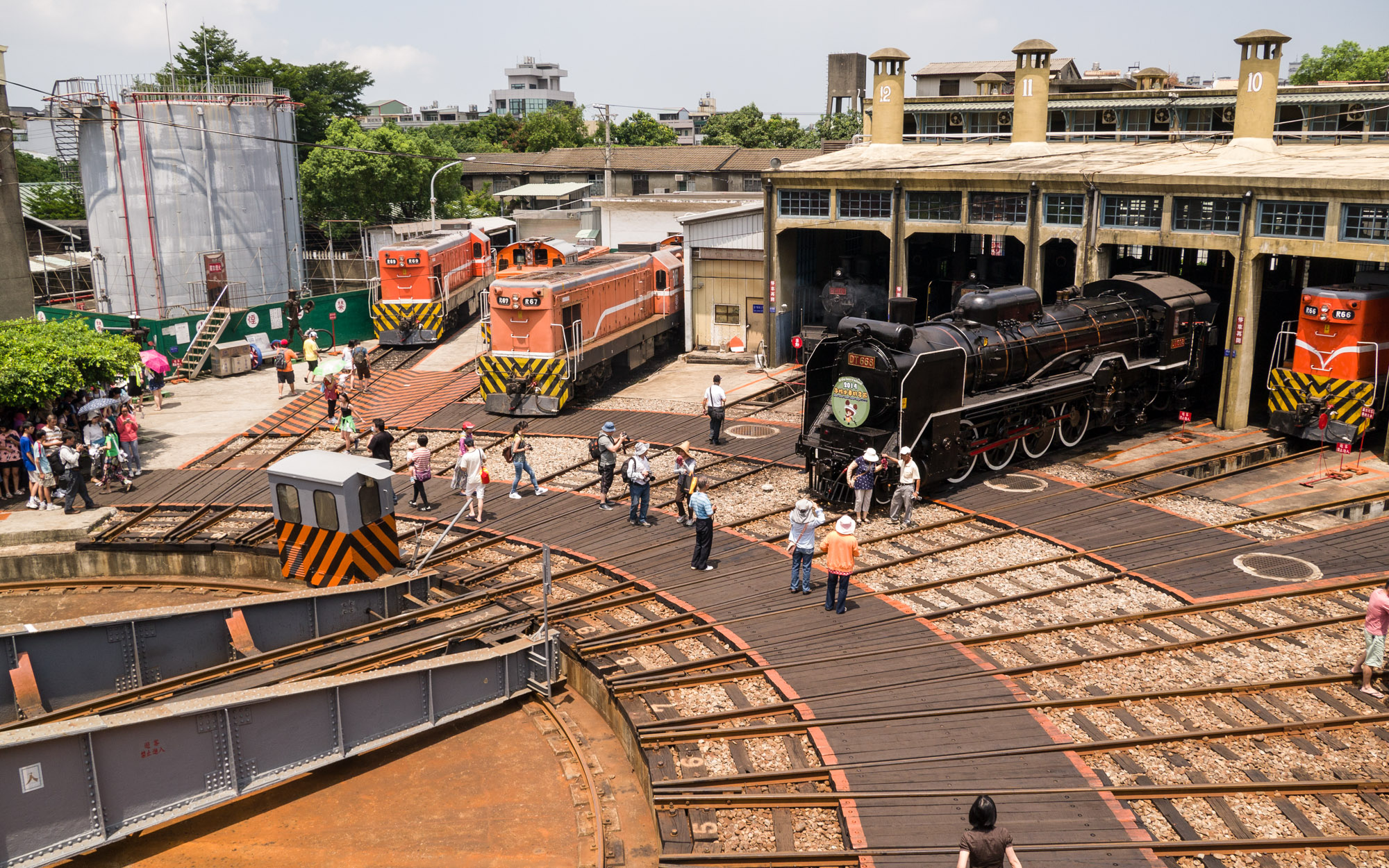
- Changhua Roundhouse and its turntable seen from the observation deck
- Interactive map of Changhua Roundhouse
- 24.0855°N 120.5401°E
- Type: Railway roundhouse
- Location: Changhua City, Taiwan

History
- Built: October 1922

Site notes
- Owner: Taiwan Railway Administration
- Visitors: Around 350,000 (in 2019)

Changhua Roundhouse (Chinese: 彰化扇形車庫; pinyin: Zhānghuà Shànxíng Chēkù) is a railway roundhouse operated by Taiwan Railway (TR) in Changhua City, Changhua County, Taiwan. The roundhouse is located directly north of Changhua railway station. Built in 1922, it is the only surviving railway roundhouse in Taiwan.

== Overview ==
Changhua Roundhouse is composed of twelve stalls for trains surrounding a turntable. The roundhouse is still operational and houses many historical trains on a rotating basis: as of October 2020, the roundhouse currently displays two steam locomotives: CK124, a CK120 locomotive, and DT668, a DT650 locomotive. Changhua Roundhouse is still operational and is used for maintenance of locomotives, but visitors are allowed to enter for free.

== History ==
Changhua Roundhouse was completed in October 1922 (Taishō 11) during Japan's rule over Taiwan, and its opening coincided with the Coastal Line section (Zhunan to Changhua) of the West Coast Line. Originally, the building had six stalls; this was increased to eight stalls in 1923, ten stalls in 1924, and twelve stalls in 1933. Allied forces bombed the roundhouse during World War II, causing damage to stalls 5 and 6. With the introduction of the R20 diesel locomotive in 1970, stalls 1 to 7 were fitted with platforms for their maintenance. Then, when the E100 electric locomotive arrived in 1980, stalls 1 and 2 were also fitted to support maintenance for electric trains.

Originally, Taiwan had five other railway roundhouses, but all of the other ones were demolished. In 1994, Changhua Roundhouse was also planned to be demolished to build a larger depot, but due to local pushback, the plan was never carried out. The depot was built south of Changhua railway station instead. On 25 October 2000, Changhua Roundhouse was protected as a county-designated monument. The rationale highlighted the building's "unique architecture" and "significance in Taiwanese railway history".

In 2015, the Changhua County Government proposed elevating the train tracks running through Changhua City, which would cut off the Roundhouse from the rest of the railway network.
