= Changhua City Library =

Public library in Changhua County, Taiwan

Changhua City Library 彰化市立圖書館
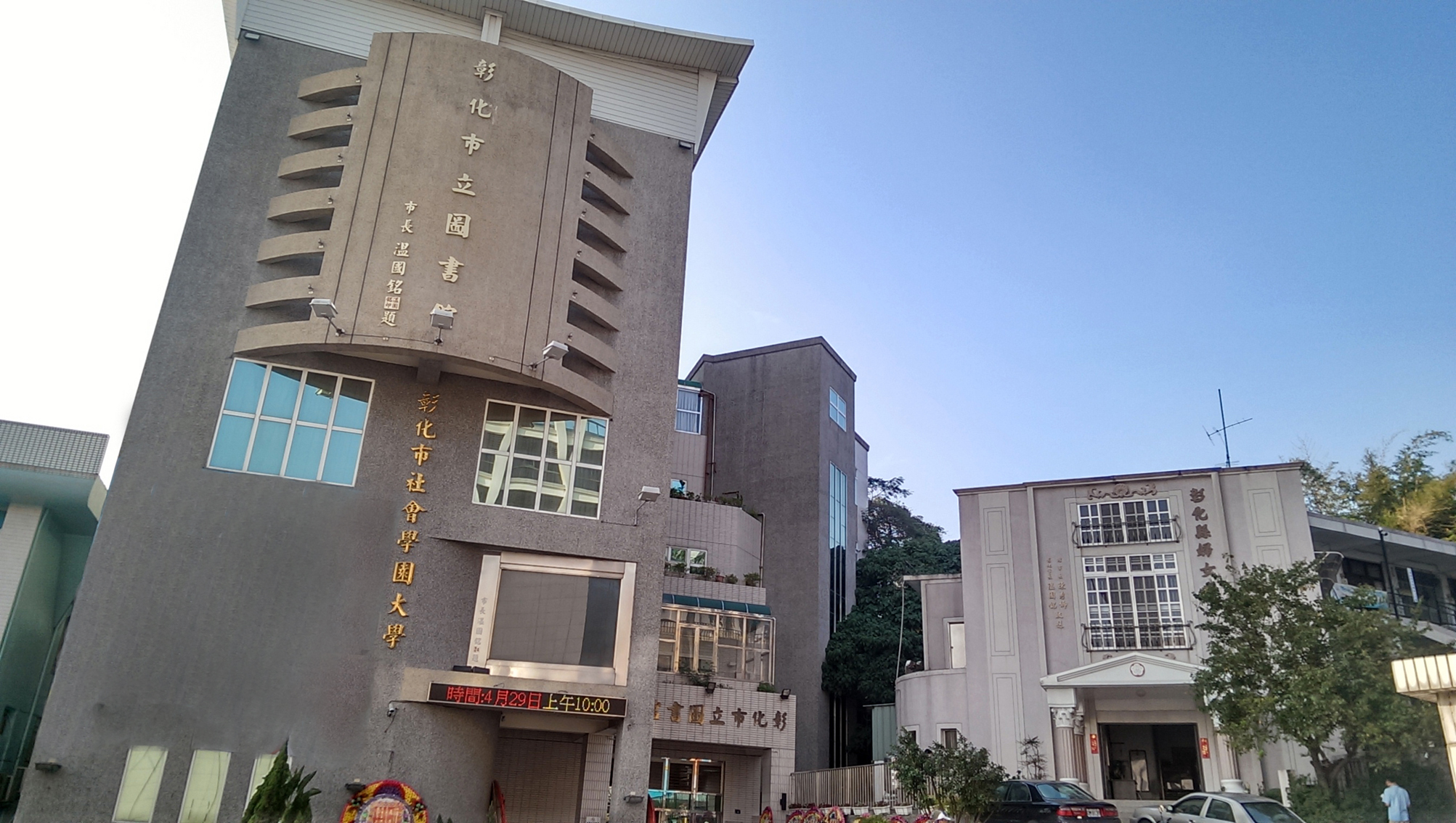
- 24°04′41.9″N 120°32′46.1″E
- Location: Changhua City, Changhua County, Taiwan
- Type: public library
- Established: 21 March 2004

Other information
- Website: Official website (in Chinese)

The Changhua City Library (traditional Chinese: 彰化市立圖書館; simplified Chinese: 彰化市立图书馆; pinyin: Zhānghuà Shìlì Túshūguǎn) is a public library in Changhua City, Changhua County, Taiwan.

== History ==
The library was inaugurated on 21 March 2004.

== Transportation ==
The library is accessible within walking distance south east of Changhua Station of Taiwan Railway.

== See also ==
- Education in Taiwan
