= Two Brothers Brewing =

Brewery in Warrenville, Illinois

Two Brothers Brewing Company
- Location: 30W315 Calumet Ave. Warrenville, IL 60555; United States
- Opened: 1996
- Annual production volume: 40,000 US beer barrels (47,000 hL)

Two Brothers Brewing Company is an independently owned Illinois-based microbrewery founded by brothers Jim and Jason Ebel in 1996. The brothers brought their knowledge of different brewing styles to the Chicago craft brew market after living in Europe and experiencing the variety of beers available there. Jim and Jason started the business using bulk milk tanks converted into fermenters that were donated to them by their grandfather who was a retired dairy farmer. Two Brothers Brewing has now been in business for over 20 years and has opened multiple locations throughout the Chicago metropolitan area, as well as one in Arizona.

== History ==
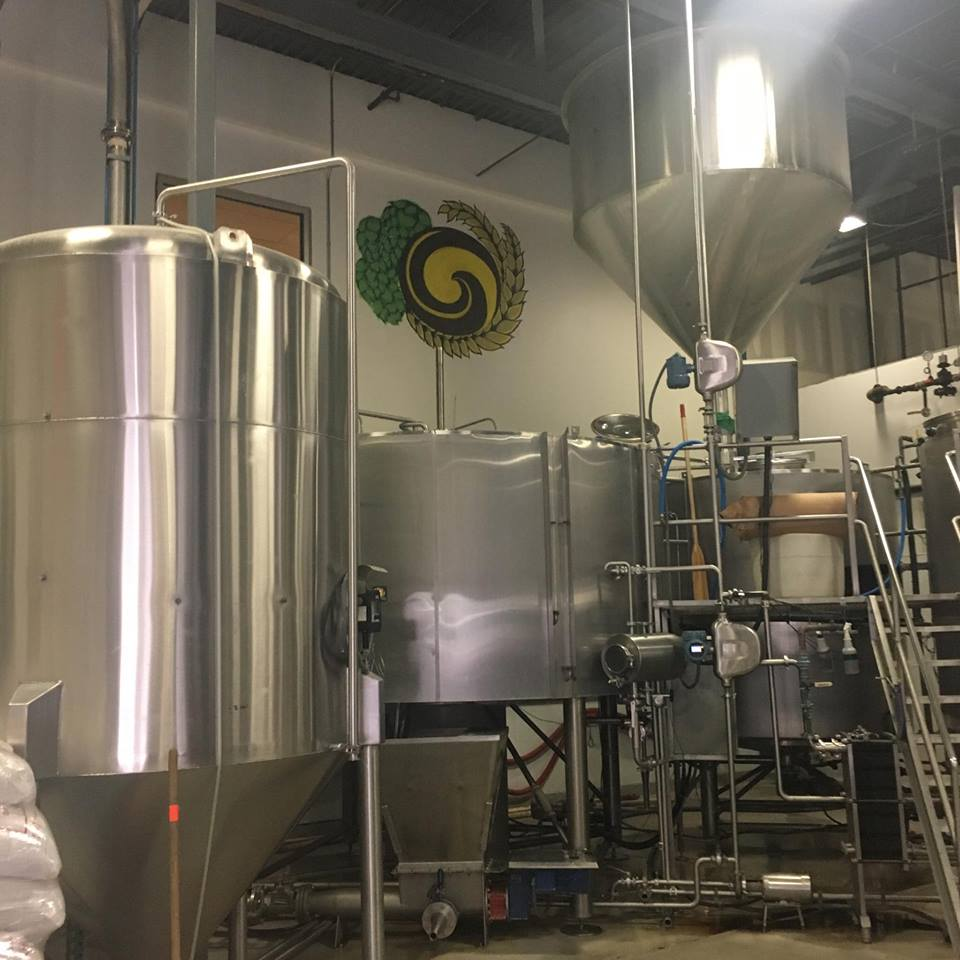
Brewing equipment at Two Brothers Brewing Warrenville location.

=== Two Brothers Tap House ===
The Ebel brothers started in business with their home brewing supply mail order business and retail store in Naperville, Illinois.

Two Brothers Brewing opened first in Warrenville, Illinois in the year 1996 when Jim and Jason Ebel returned to the United States after living in France. When they arrived back home they had difficulty finding the style of beers that were common in Europe. This encouraged the Ebel brothers to enter the brewing industry in order to bring the European-style brews to the Chicago market. Using their prior experience working in a brewery located in Denver, they went into production using bulk milk tanks that were donated to them from their grandfather. Two Brothers Tap House remains in Warrenville, Illinois where they offer tours of their newly equipped brewery to the public every weekend.

=== Two Brothers Roundhouse ===
After establishing themselves in the industry Jim and Jason Ebel set their eyes on expansion. In May 2011 they announced that they had purchased America's Historic Roundhouse in Aurora, Illinois after the former owner filed for bankruptcy. Their intentions were to keep the Roundhouse a restaurant and venue but also planned to include weddings and banquet events. The Roundhouse was built in 1865 for the Chicago and Aurora Railroad. After being abandoned in 1974 it was then purchased by a group of investors led by Walter Payton in 1995 and converted into a restaurant and brewpub. The Roundhouse officially reopened in June 2011 as the Two Brothers Roundhouse.

=== Two Brothers Tap House and Brewery ===
Two Brothers Brewing owners Jim and Jason Ebel then decided to open their first location outside of the state of Illinois in Scottsdale, Arizona. Two Brothers Tap House and Brewery opened its doors to the Arizona market in January 2015. Initially serving as a restaurant for its first 6 months, the Arizona location served its first beer brewed within its Scottsdale brewery in October 2015.

=== The Craftsman By Two Brothers ===
In September 2016 Two Brothers opened The Craftsman in Naperville, Illinois. This multi-level dining establishment integrates a market cafe, modern tavern, and cocktail experience into one location. The Craftsmen includes a bakery, a cafe, a juice bar, a deli, a market, a butcher, a restaurant, and a cocktail bar. However, being the first restaurant the Ebel brothers opened that did not include a brewery, the beers served at this location are brewed elsewhere.

=== Two Brothers Social Tap ===
Jim and Jason Ebel set their eyes on opening the Two Brothers Social Tap in Oak Park, Illinois sometime in June, 2017. The new location is set to open as a cafe and offer coffee, beer, and spirits along with food. The establishment will come as Two Brothers Brewing's fifth location to open and the company's second location without a brewpub.

== Beers ==
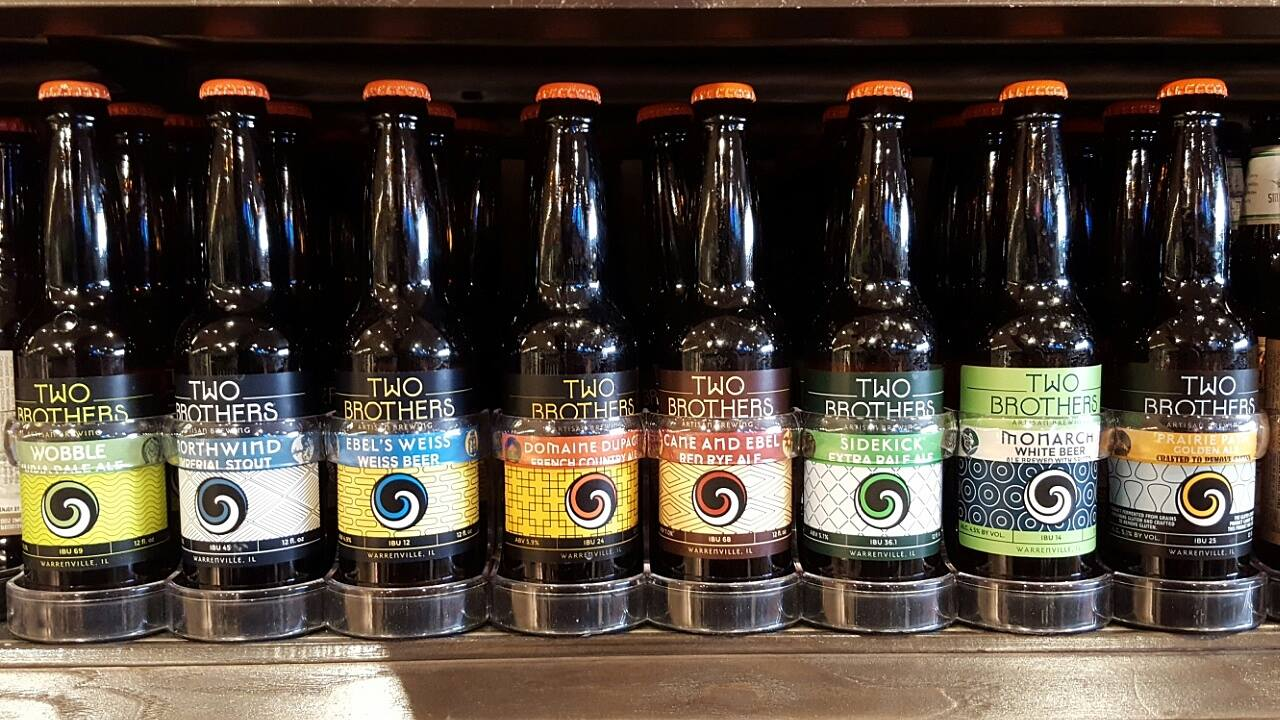
Two Brothers beers at Jewel-Osco.

Two Brothers Brewing produces over twenty beers with a wide variety of styles. Their beers are brewed year-round, seasonal, or part of their Special Projects Division.

Two Brothers Beers
Name	Style	ABV%	IBU	Notes
Twenty-Plus	Pilsner Lager	4.8%	42.1	Year-round
Cane and Ebel	Red Rye Ale	7%	68	Year-round
Domaine DuPage	French Country Ale	5.9%	24	Year-round
Ebel's Weiss	Weiss Beer	4.9%	12	Year-round
Outlaw 2.0	India Pale Ale	6.3%	40	Year-round
Pinball	Juicy Hop Pale Ale	5.4%	31	Year-round
Prairie Path	Golden Ale	5.1%	25	Year-round
Sidekick	Extra Pale Ale	5.1%	36.1	Year-round
Wobble	India Pale Ale	6.3%	69	Year-round
A Bretter Day	Biere De Mars Ale	5.5%	23.1	Seasonal: May
Atom Smasher	Oak Aged Oktoberfest Style Lager	7.7%	22.6	Seasonal: August
Dog Days	Dortmunder Style Lager	5.1%	27	Seasonal: April
Heavy Handed	Wet Hopped India Pale Ale	6.7%	65	Seasonal: October
Hop Centric	Double India Pale Ale	9.9%	100.1	Seasonal: June
Monarch	White Beer	4.5%	14	Seasonal: February
Night Cat	Hoppy Wheat Ale	5.7%	43.2	Seasonal: August
Northwind	Imperial Stout	9.1%	45	Seasonal: November
Peppermint Bark	Porter	6.7%	32	Seasonal: November
Revelry	Imperial Red Ale	9.5%	124	Seasonal: November
Bare Tree	Weiss Wine	11.2%	50	Special Projects Division
In The Flesh	Blueberry American Sour	4.2%	7	Special Projects Division
Project Opus	Special Sours	n/a	n/a	Special Projects Division
Sour Beer #2	American Wild Ale	n/a	n/a	n/a

== Sustainability efforts ==
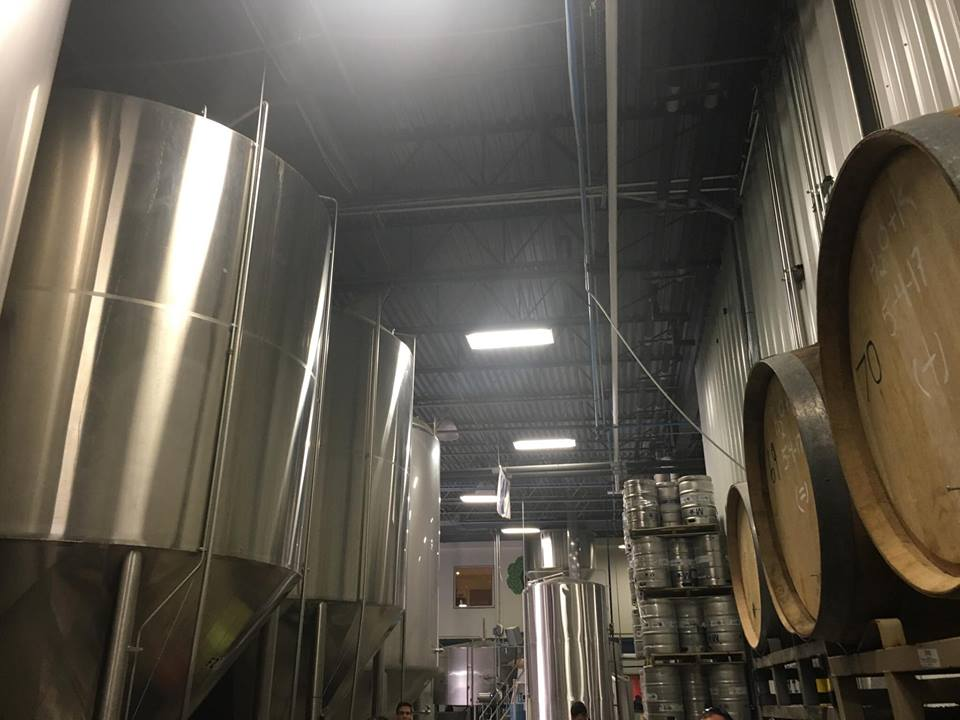
Brewing equipment at Two Brothers Warrenville location.

Two Brothers Brewing owners Jim and Jason Ebel are passionate about their efforts to promote energy-efficiency in their facilities as they “craft with a conscience.” Their practices include using green, renewable energy at all of their locations, as well as using recycled and recyclable materials in their packaging. Extra money was spent purchasing the latest energy-efficient equipment including an ultra-high efficient boiler which allows for the conservation of water during the brewing process.

To provide their customers with the most fresh produce, Two Brothers facilities grow their own ingredients in their organic rooftop gardens, as well as purchase their products locally from within 200 miles of the restaurant's locations which reduces their carbon footprint by minimizing transportation distance. In a display of their commitment to give back to local communities the brewery supplies local farmers with spent grain to aid them in feeding their cattle.

The Two Brothers Tap House and The Two Brothers Roundhouse were the first restaurants in DuPage County and Kane County respectively, to join the Green Chicago Restaurant Coalition. The mission of Green Chicago Restaurant Coalition is to "empower members of the food service industry and dedicated diners alike to reduce our collective footprint, bolstering the health of our planet and its people." Two Brothers has also joined the Natural Resources Defense Council to support the use of clean water in brewing practices.

== Awards and acknowledgments ==
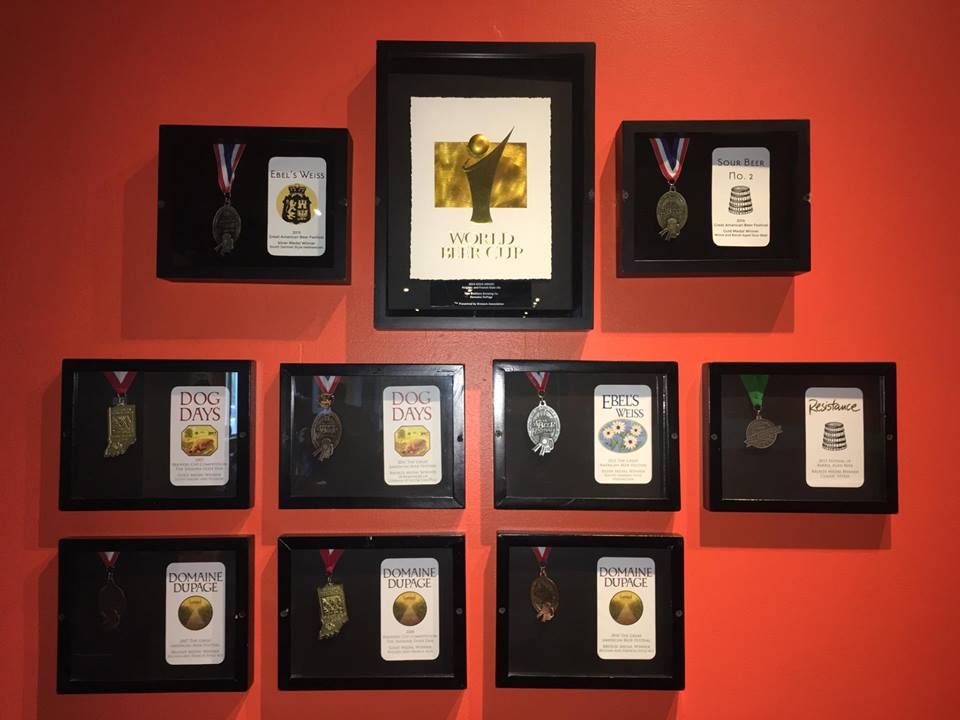
Two Brothers Brewing awards.

Two Brothers Brewing has received a variety of awards from organizations such as the Great American Beer Festival and the World Beer Cup. They have also been acknowledged by various news sources for having outstanding products. Below is a list of awards and acknowledgements that Two Brothers Brewing has received.

Name	Style	Honors
Cane and Ebel	Red Rye Ale	Rated Top 7 beer by USA Today
Domaine DuPage	French Country Ale	2016 GABF Gold Medal Winner in Belgian- and French-Style Ale 2016 World Beer Cup Bronze Medal Winner in Belgian- and French-Style Ale 2014 World Beer Cup Gold Medal Winner in Belgian- and French-Style Ale 2012 GABF Bronze Medal Winner in Belgian- and French-Style Ale 2010 GABF Bronze Medal Winner in Belgian- and French-Style Ale 2007 GABF Bronze Medal Winner in Belgian- and French-Style Ale Called a Chicago Classic by the Chicago Tribune
Ebel's Weiss	Weiss Beer	2013 GABF Silver Medal Winner in South German-Style Hefeweizen 2012 GABF Silver Medal Winner in South German-Style Hefeweizen
Prairie Path	Golden Ale	Rated one of the best gluten friendly beers by Indianapolis Star
Wobble IPA	India Pale Ale	Voted a top 15 IPA in America by Paste Magazine Top 5 summer beer by Fox News
Dog Days	Dortmunder Style Lager	2011 GABF Bronze Medal Winner in Dortmunder or German-Style Oktoberfest
Sour Beer #2	American Wild Ale	2014 GABF Gold Medal Winner in Wood- and Barrel-Aged Sour Beer

== Distribution ==
Two Brothers Brewing company currently distributes to a total of 13 states within the United States. The states in which Two Brothers Brewing products are currently available include Illinois, Connecticut, Florida, Indiana, Minnesota, New York, Ohio, Missouri, Iowa, Pennsylvania, Wisconsin, Arizona, and New Jersey. Below is a list of the states and distributors that provide their respective state's market with Two Brothers products.

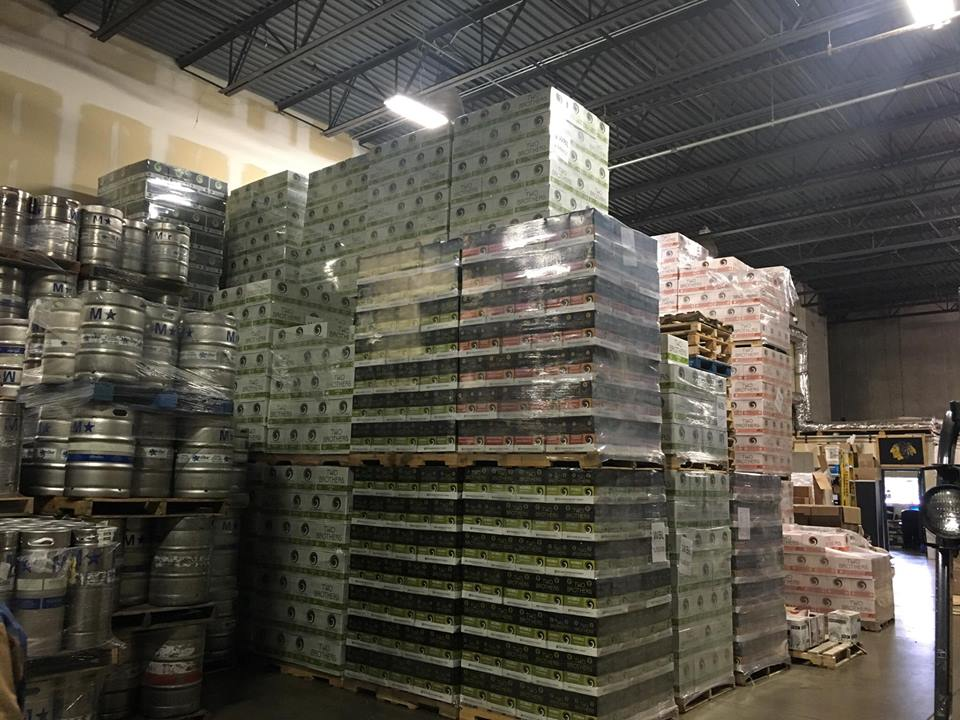
Packaged product at Two Brothers Brewery.

- Arizona- Arizona Beer & Cider Company
- Iowa- Johnson Brothers of Iowa
- Missouri- Major Brands
- Wisconsin- River City Distributing
- Indiana- Cavalier Distributing
- Ohio- Cavalier Distributing
- New York- Union Beer Distributors
- Connecticut- Sarene Craft Beer Distributors
- Maryland- Backup Beverage
- Florida- Cavalier Distributors
- Illinois- Windy City Distribution
- New Jersey- Sarene Craft Beer Distributors

== Festivals ==
On 26 March 2007, Two Brothers Brewing celebrated its 10th anniversary at Charlie's Ale House in Wheaton, Illinois with the tapping of "Project Opus 10", a lambic-style sour ale.

On 6 June 2009, Two Brothers Brewing celebrated the 2009 release of its Hop Juice Double IPA with a festival held at the brewery, called "For the Love of Hops". The festival featured special beers from craft breweries across the US, including Surly Brewing Company, Dogfish Head Brewery, Stone Brewing Company, Allagash Brewing Company, and Ska Brewing.

On 12 June 2010, Two Brothers Brewing celebrated their 2nd annual release of its Hop Juice Double IPA with a festival at the brewery in Warrenvile, Illinois titled "For The Love Of Hops." The festival hosted by Two Brothers Brewing included 4 bands and a variety of guest beers from different parts of the country.

On 1 June 2011, Two Brothers Brewing hosted their annual Hop Juice Festival to celebrate the release of the popular artisan beers Hop Juice Double IPA and Hop Juice Black. The festival took place at their newly opened Two Brothers Roundhouse in Aurora, Illinois.

On 1 June 2012, Two Brothers Brewing hosted the Hop Juice Festival at the Two Brothers Roundhouse location in Aurora, Illinois. This festival included the 4th Annual Hop Jucie Festival Home Brew competition in which home brewers enter to compete against one another.

On 2 June 2013, Two Brothers Brewing hosted the Two Brothers Summer Festival at the Two Brothers Roundhouse location in Aurora, Illinois. This event supported Make-A-Wish Foundation, and Mutual Ground charities.

On 20 June 2014, Two Brothers Brewing hosted its sixth annual Two Brothers Summer Festival at the Two Brothers Roundhouse location in Aurora, Illinois. This event supported Make-A-Wish Foundation, and Communities in Schools of Aurora.

On 26 June 2015, Two Brothers Brewing hosted the Two Brothers Summer Festival at the Two Brothers Roundhouse location in Aurora, Illinois. At the event the company released its Hop Centric Double IPA.

On 3 June 2015, Two Brothers Brewing hosted the Two Brothers Summer Festival at River Edge Park in Aurora, Illinois. The event was hosted with the goal of giving back to the community.

On 2 June 2017, Two Brothers Brewing will host the Two Brothers Summer Festival at River Edge Park in Aurora in Aurora, Illinois. The event will be hosted with raising money for charity being its ultimate goal.

== See also ==
- Barrel-aged beer
