= Changhua railway station =

Railway station in Changhua City, Taiwan

Changhua 彰化
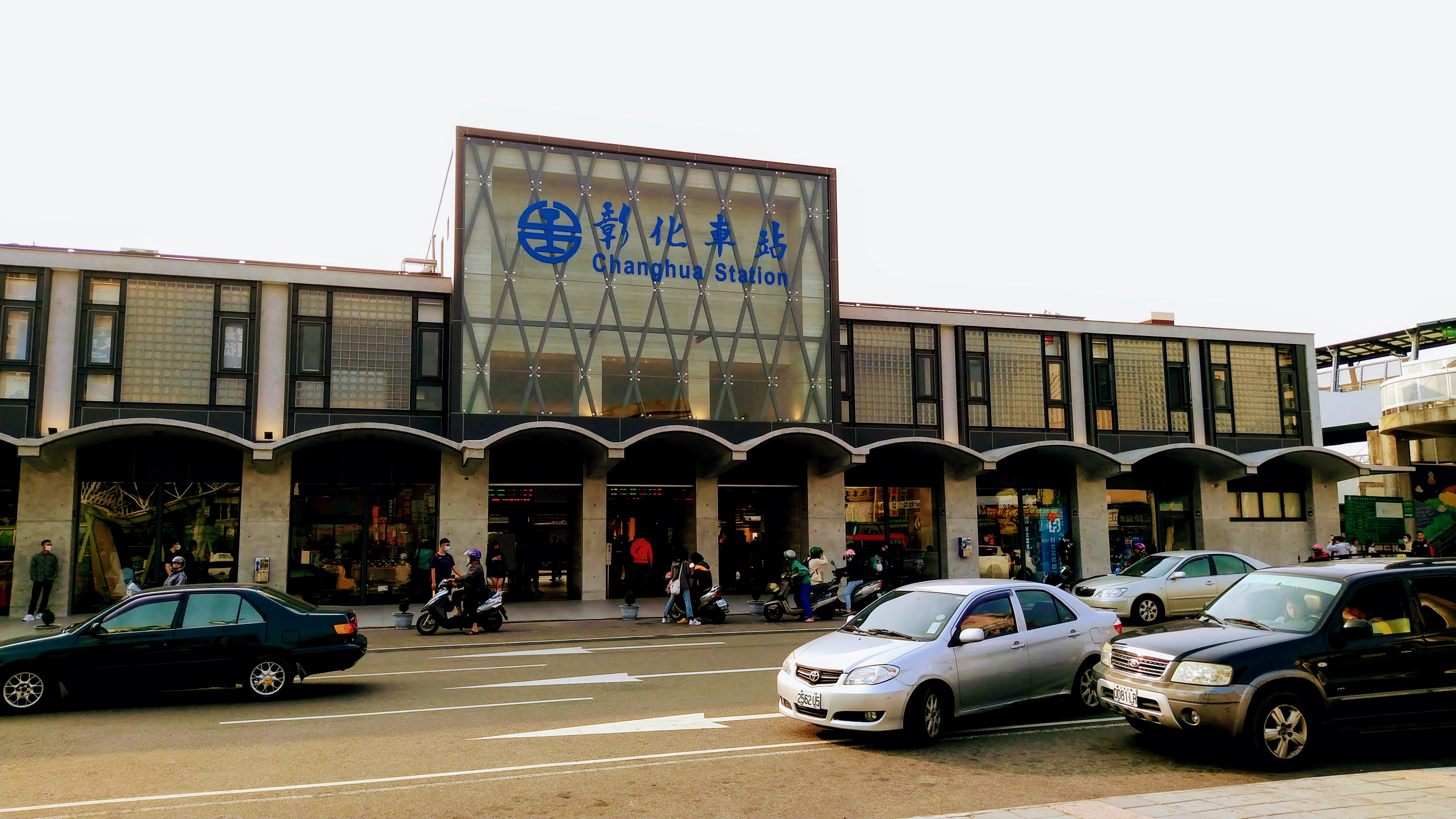

Chinese name
- Traditional Chinese: 彰化
Transcriptions
Standard Mandarin
- Hanyu Pinyin: Zhānghuà
- Bopomofo: ㄓㄤ ㄏㄨㄚˋ
Hakka
- Romanization: Zóng-fa (Sixian dialect); Zhòng-fǎ (Hailu dialect)
Southern Min
- Tâi-lô: Tsiang-huà; Tsiong-huà

General information
- Location: 1 Sanmin Rd; Changhua City, Changhua County; Taiwan
- Coordinates: 24.0817°N 120.5385°E
- System: Taiwan Railway railway station
- Lines: Western Trunk line; Western Trunk line
- Distance: 210.9 km to Keelung via Taichung
- Connections: Local bus; Coach

Construction
- Structure type: Ground level

Other information
- Station code: 149 (three-digit); 1120 (four-digit); A49 (statistical)
- Classification: First class (Chinese: 一等)
- Website: www.railway.gov.tw/Changhua/ (in Chinese)

History
- Opened: 1905-03-26
- Rebuilt: 1958
- Electrified: 1978-10-25
- Former names: Shōka (Japanese: 彰化)

Key dates
- 1918: Rebuilt

Passengers
- 2017: 11.064 million per year ▲1.13%
- Rank: 11 out of 228

Services
Preceding station	Taiwan Railway	Following station
Chenggong towards Keelung	Western Trunk line	Huatan towards Kaohsiung
Zhuifen towards Zhunan	Western Trunk line (coastal)	Terminus
Location
- Location within Taiwan

Changhua (Chinese: 彰化; pinyin: Zhānghuà) is a railway station in Changhua City, Changhua County, Taiwan served by Taiwan Railway. It is located at the southern junction of the Taichung line and Coastal line, where the line continues onto the southern section of the West Coast line.

== Overview ==
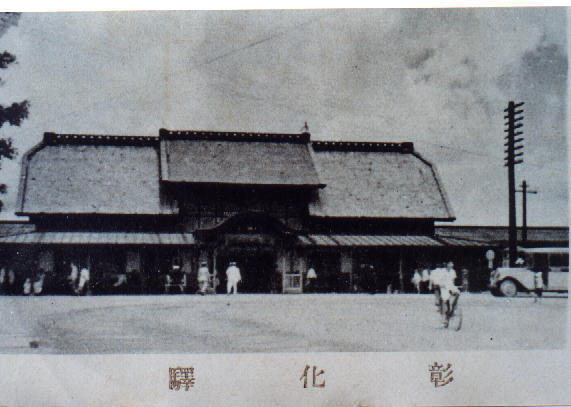
Changhua Station when it first opened in 1905

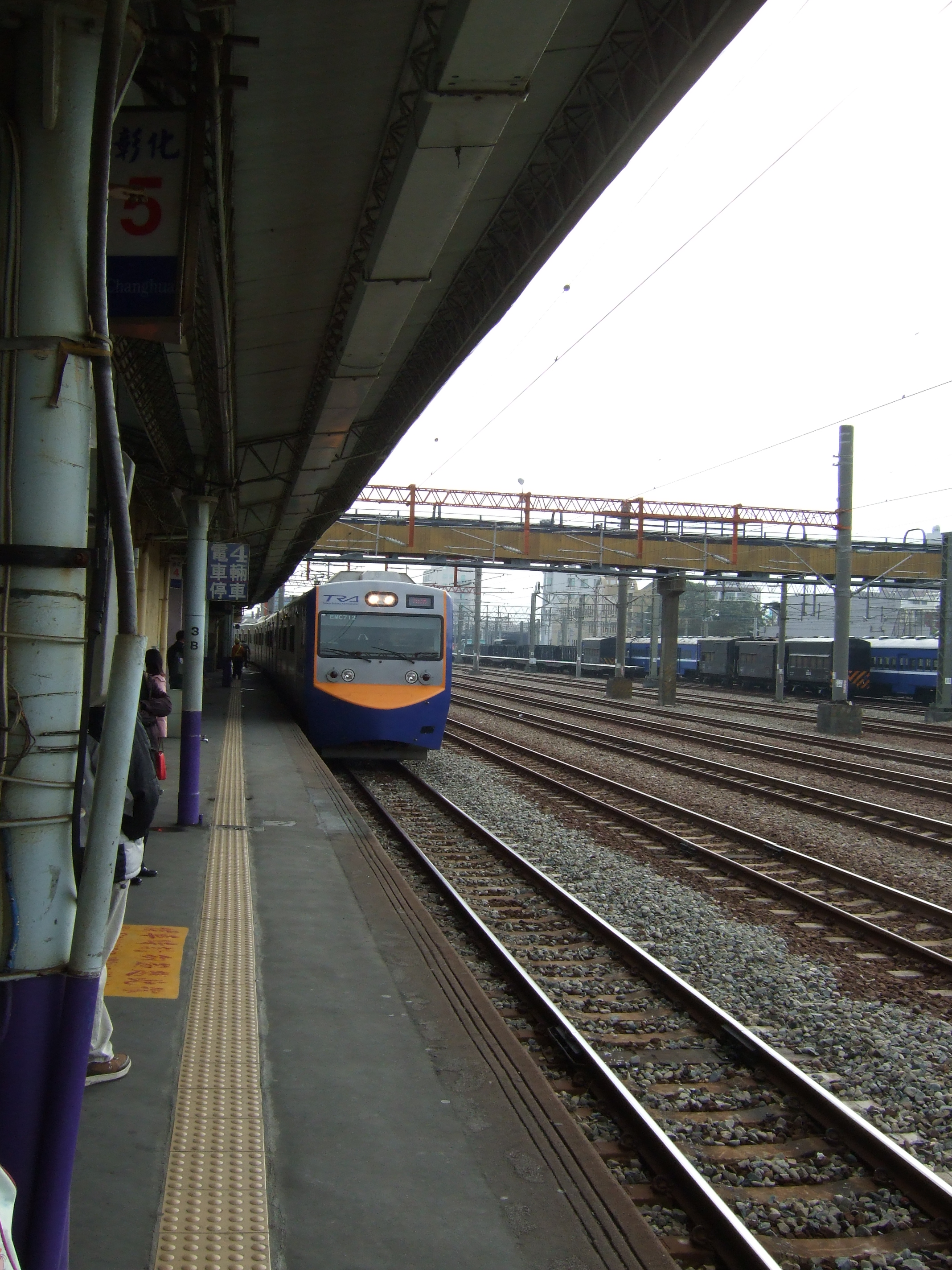
A TRA EMU700 train approaches the station.

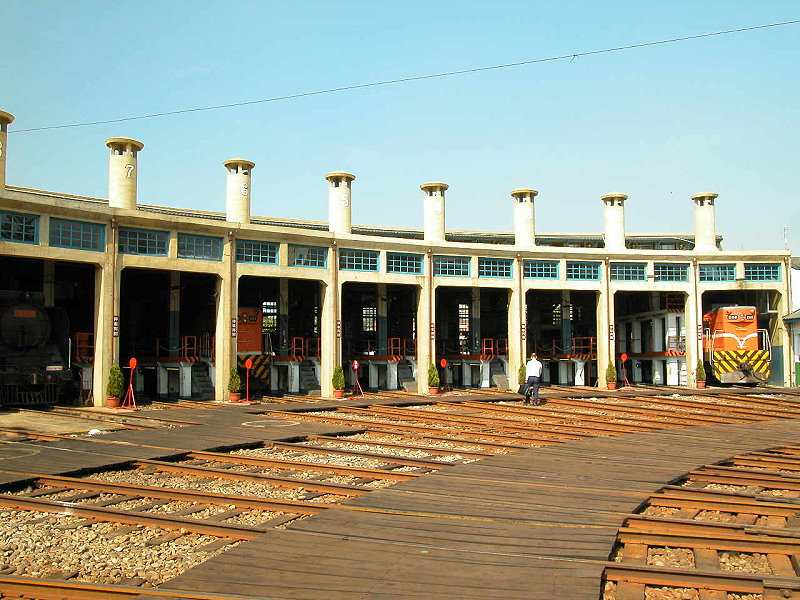
Changhua Roundhouse at Changhua, Taiwan, built in 1922, still remains in use.

The station has two island platforms and one side platform. Currently, there is an overpass at the south side of the station to access the back station platforms. A cross-platform station is currently under construction on the north side.

=== History ===
- 26 March 1905: The station opened as Changhua-eki (彰化驛).
- 1918: The second-generation station was completed.
- 1922: The fan-shaped depot was constructed, as well as an overpass for the station.
- 10 December 1958: Construction on the current station was completed.
- 15 June 1959: The current station began service. Also, a restaurant in the station was built (it has since ceased operating).
- 19 January 2004: The fan-shaped depot was designated as a historical site.
- 27 May 2005: Renovation on the fan-shaped depot was completed.
- 25 February 2008: In order to increase service, the Taroko Express began stopping at the station.

== Platform layout ==
1	1	■ West Coast line (southbound)	Toward Chiayi, Tainan, Kaohsiung, Pingtung
1	1	■ South-Link line (southbound)	Toward Taitung
1	1	■ Jiji line (southbound)	Toward Jiji, Checheng
2	2B	■ West Coast line (northbound, through traffic)	Toward Taichung, Hsinchu, Taipei, Keelung
2	2B	■ West Coast line (southbound, through traffic)	Toward Chiayi, Tainan, Kaohsiung, Pingtung
2	2B	■ West Coast line (northbound departure for Coastal line)	Toward Dajia, Zhunan, Hsinchu
3	3A	■ West Coast line (northbound)	Toward Taichung, Hsinchu, Taipei, Keelung
3	3A	■ West Coast line (southbound cross-line)	Toward Su'ao, Hualien, Taitung
4	3B	■ West Coast line (northbound)	Toward Taichung, Hsinchu, Taipei, Keelung
4	3B	■ West Coast line (northbound departure)	Toward Taichung, Hsinchu, Taipei, Keelung
4	3B	■ West Coast line (southbound departure)	Toward Chiayi, Tainan, Kaohsiung, Pingtung

== Around the station ==
- Changhua Arts Hall
- Changhua City Library
- Changhua County Art Museum
- Changhua County Council
- Changhua County Government
- Changhua Girls' Senior High School
- Changhua Roundhouse
- Changhua Wude Hall
- Chienkuo Technology University
- Kaihua Temple
- National Changhua University of Education
- Yuanching Temple
- Changhua City Office
- Taiwan Theater
- Changhua Theater
- Changhua County Police Department
- Changhua bus transfer stations

== See also ==
- List of railway stations in Taiwan
