= Koxinga Ancestral Shrine =

- 鄭成功祖廟
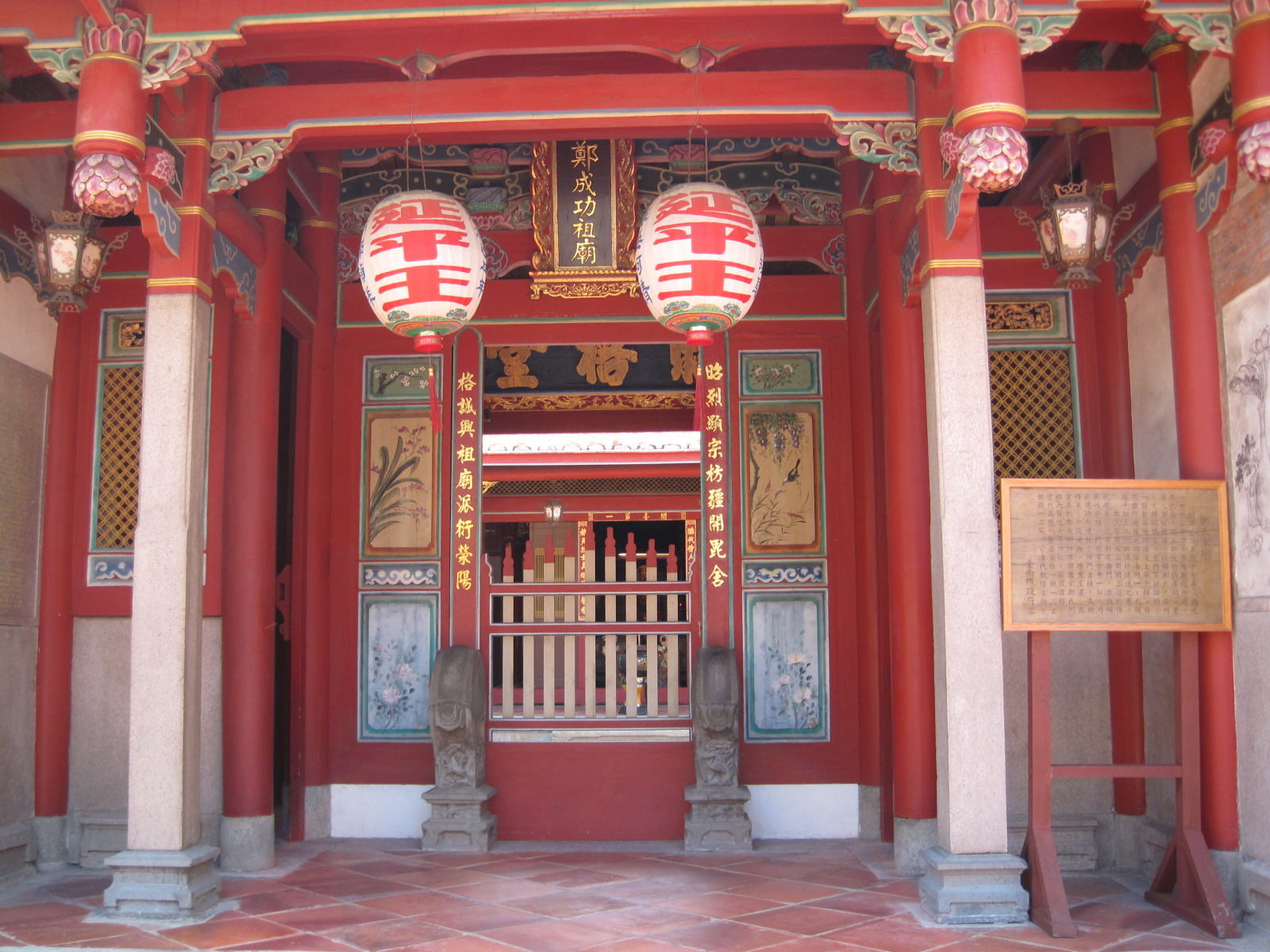
- Interactive map of the Koxinga Ancestral Shrine area

General information
- Type: Shrine
- Location: West Central, Tainan, Taiwan
- Coordinates: 22.992597°N 120.203054°E
- Opened: 1663

Design and construction
- Developer: Zheng Jing

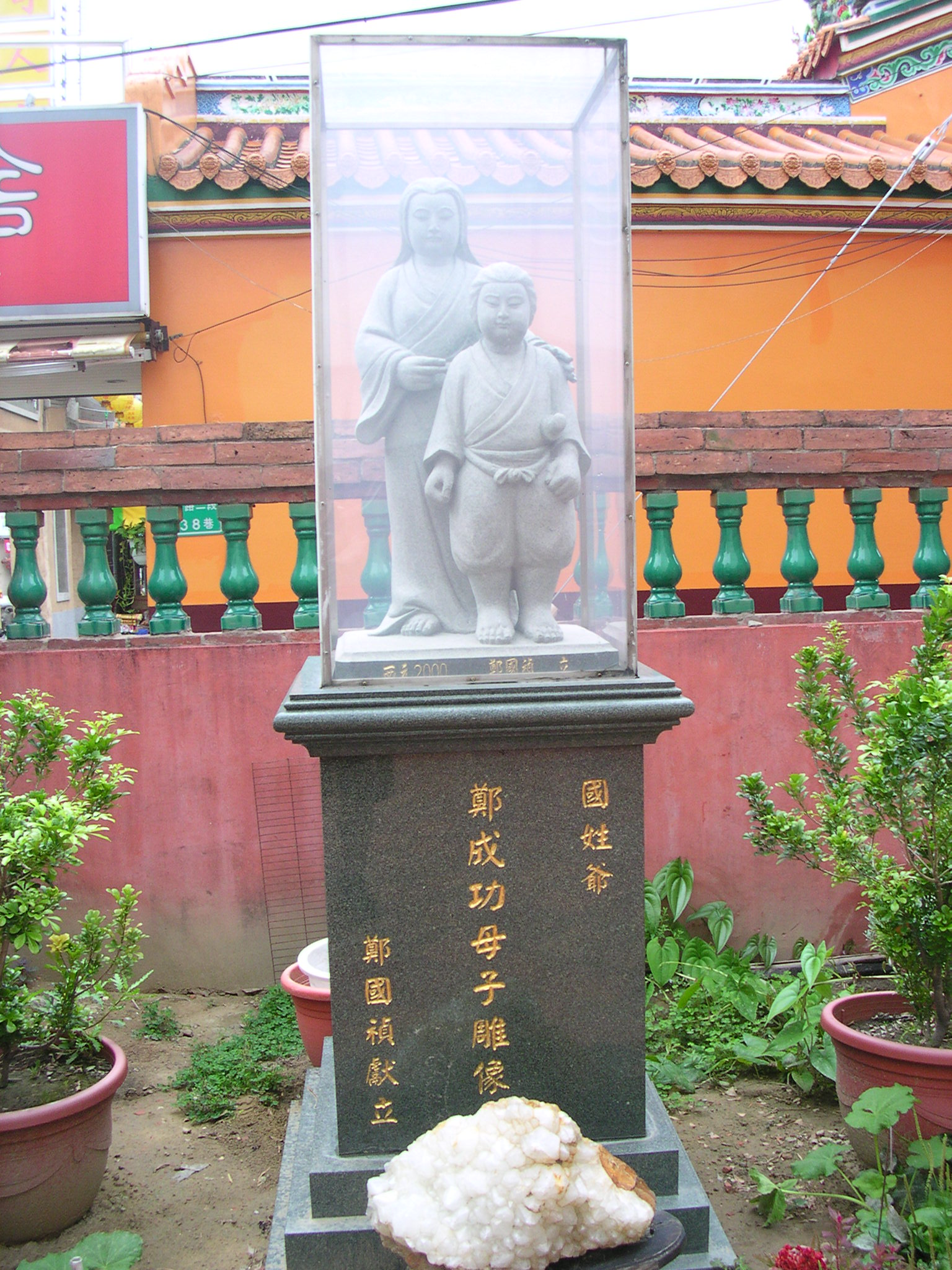
Koxinga's mother and him as a child

Koxinga Ancestral Shrine (Chinese: 鄭成功祖廟; pinyin: Zhèngchénggōng Zǔmiào) is a family shrine built in West Central District, Tainan, Taiwan in 1663 by Zheng Jing, to worship his father Koxinga.

When Taiwan became part of the Qing dynasty, it was renamed "The Cheng's Ancestral Shrine" (鄭氏大宗祠) and today the official name is "Ancestral Shrine of Koxinga". The complex is traditional and elegant. There is an old well in front of the gate and this is all that remains of the original shrine.

The central hall worships the statue of Koxinga as well as the spirit tablets of each generation of ancestors. In 1771, there was a famous wooden tablet with the character "Three Generations Heritage" (三圭世錫) to prize the virtue of Koxinga's family.

In this shrine, there is also a sculpture of young Koxinga and his mother Tagawa Matsu.

It is not to be confused with the nearby Koxinga Shrine.

== See also ==
- Chinese ancestral veneration
- Beiji Temple
- Grand Matsu Temple
- Taiwan Confucian Temple
- State Temple of the Martial God
- Temple of the Five Concubines
- List of temples in Taiwan
- List of tourist attractions in Taiwan
