= Beiji Temple =

Temple in West Central, Tainan, Taiwan

- 北極殿
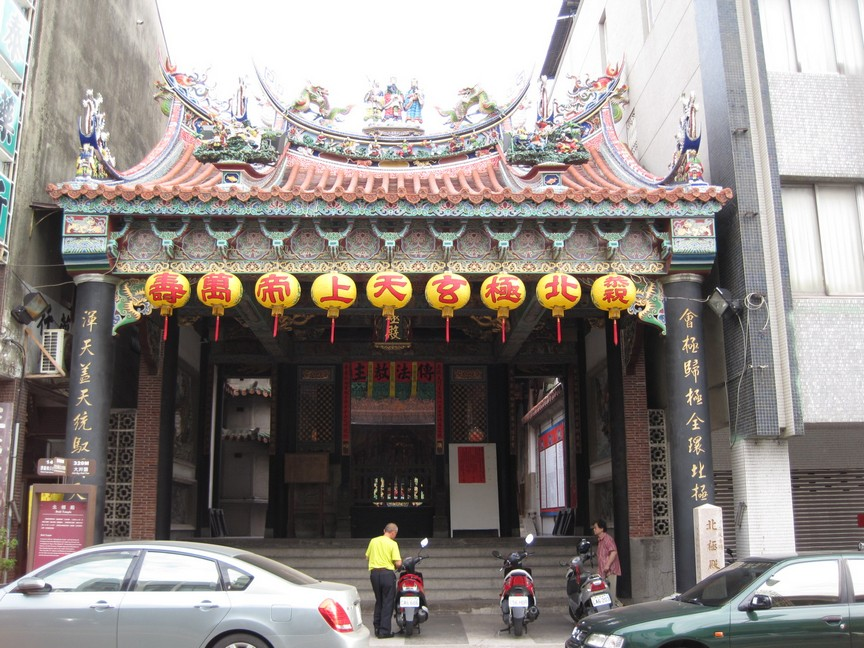

- Location within Tainan

Location
- Location: West Central, Tainan, Taiwan
- Interactive map of Beiji Temple
- Coordinates: 22°59′39.8″N 120°12′16.9″E

Architecture
- Type: temple

The Beiji Temple (traditional Chinese: 北極殿; simplified Chinese: 北极殿; pinyin: Běijí Diàn) is a temple dedicated to Xuantian Shangdi in West Central District, Tainan, Taiwan.

== History ==
The temple has undergone several renovations. In 1804, an additional building was added at the back side of the temple for temporary accommodations for soldiers and townsmen. In 1907, the temple front was demolished for road expansion. In 1964, the temple was demolished again when a 15-meter wide road was constructed by the Tainan City Government. The front hall of the temple was restored in 1971.

== Transportation ==
The temple is accessible within walking distance southwest of Tainan Station of Taiwan Railway.

== See also ==
- Grand Matsu Temple
- Taiwan Confucian Temple
- State Temple of the Martial God
- Temple of the Five Concubines
- List of temples in Taiwan
- List of tourist attractions in Taiwan
- Magong Beiji Temple
