= State Temple of the Martial God =

Temple in Yongfu Road, West Central District, Tainan, Taiwan

Coordinates: 22°59′47″N 120°12′08″E

- 祀典武廟
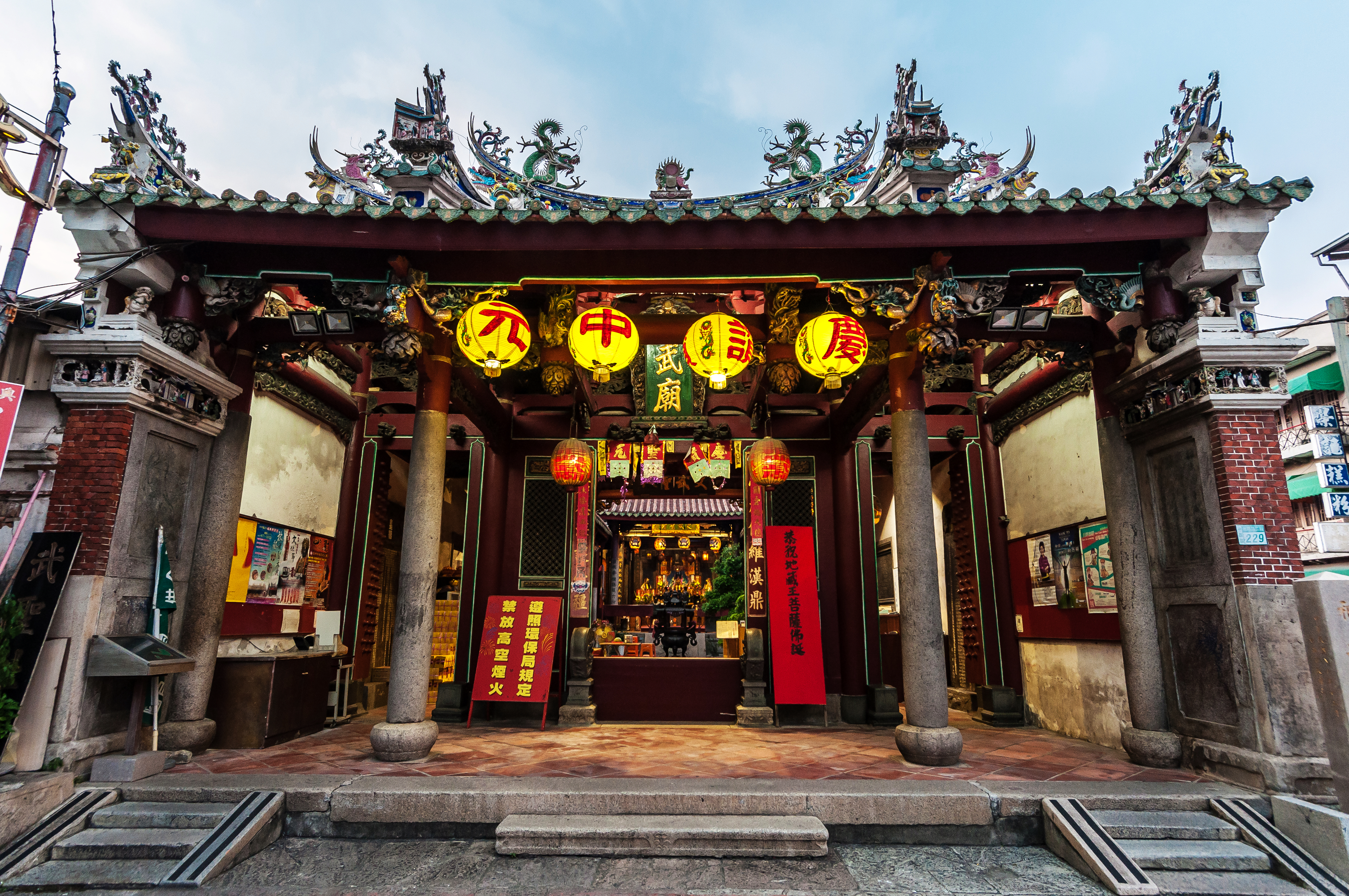

Location
- Location: West Central, Tainan, Taiwan
- Interactive map of State Temple of the Martial God

Architecture
- Type: Temple

State Temple of the Martial God, also called Tainan Sacrificial Rites Martial Temple (Chinese: 祀典武廟; pinyin: Sìdiǎn Wǔmiào) or Grand Guandi Temple, is a temple located in Yongfu Road, West Central District, Tainan, Taiwan. This temple was previously the palace of Koxinga and Prince of Ningjing, members of the Ming imperial family who retreated to Taiwan in the dying days of the Ming dynasty.

The temple is dedicated to the deity Guan Gong, whose statue in the building was brought to Taiwan from Fujian Province, China, by relatives of the Prince of Ningjing during the Ming dynasty.

There are some minor temples as well:

- Two smaller temples of Guanyin, a Buddhist fertility goddess.
- The temple of Yue Lao, where single people pray for luck to find their soulmate.
- A horse god temple located across Yong-Fu Road.

The horse god takes the form of a soldier who looks after the horses. Since Guan Gong was always assisted in his work by horses, his followers built this temple to show their respect and appreciation.

== History ==
The temple was built in 1663 by Zheng Jing, the eldest son of Koxinga. It was renovated, modified, and expanded in 1690. It was renovated and expanded once more in 1716, leading to its present form. A shrine for 3 generations of Guan Yu's family was added in 1725 for their worship, and in 1727 the temple's status was elevated to that of an official temple.

== Features ==
The main shrine of the State Temple of the Martial God

The State Temple of the Martial God is a typical Southern Min (Hokkien) building style temple, an architectural style that could be found in Fujian Province around the Ming dynasty.

=== Wall ===
A major feature of the temple is its long, high, red wall along Yung-Fu Road, called a “horseback style wall”, named for its appearance which is similar to a horse's bare back.

=== Five Roofs ===
Looking above the wall, five different kinds of roofs are visible. The style of the most decorated one is called “swallows tail” and is also typical of the Hokkien architecture. As with other traditional temples, the roofs of Tainan Sacrificial Rites Martial Temple also decorated with dragons.

=== Door Knobs ===
There are three red doors at the main entrance of the temple. The largest central door is decorated with 72 studs, and the other two smaller doors have 54 studs each. These are all multiples of 9, which is a royal symbolic number, and the temple was previously the palace of Koxinga and Prince of Ningjing, members of the Ming royal family who retreated to Taiwan in the dying days of the Ming dynasty.

=== Animals feature decorated ===
Above the entrance, carvings of a number of animals, including elephants, dragons, and the mythical Chinese flying creature “Qilin” (which has a head like a dragon, and the body of a winged horse), are visible. These animals are placed here to protect the temple and ward off evil. At the meeting points of columns and beams are lotus shaped decorations. These decorations conceal studs that secure the beams’ structure, as no nails were reputedly used in the temple's construction.

=== Historical Name Plates ===
There are many famous and historical name plates in the temple. Immediately on entering the temple and located above the door is large nameplate with the three Chinese characters “Da Zhang Fu” (大丈夫) carved in it. In Chinese culture, “Da Zhang Fu” represents courage, strength, and loyalty, the traits of Guan-Gong. This name plate was presented to the temple by a Qing dynasty general in A.D. 1791.

=== Statues of Guan Gong ===
Beyond the entrance courtyard, is the main altar of Guan Gong, or Lord Guan. The statue of Guan Gong in this temple was brought to Taiwan from Fu-Chien Province, China, by relatives of the Prince of Ningjing during the Ming dynasty, and has remained here ever since.

=== Statues of Guan Gong's Son and Bodyguard ===
To the right of the statue of Guan Gong, in a red and gold robe, is Guan Gong’s son, Guan Ping. On the left, holding a huge weapon and wearing a fearsome expression, is Zhou Cang, fabled to be Guan Gong’s loyal general and bodyguard. On hearing of Guan Gong’s death, he immediately committed suicide as a further demonstration of his loyalty.

=== Window Decoration ===
There are passages past the altar on either side. The windows along the passages are shaped like traditional Chinese coins – a circular shape and a square hole in the middle. When the sun shines through the windows, the floor seems to be covered with money. Guan-Gong is reported to have advised his followers to spend every coin wisely, and not to waste money: this may be why he has become the patron saint of accountants.

=== Guanyin Statue ===
Guanyin Hall

To the rear and the left of the first part of the temple, is another, smaller temple, the temple of Guan-Yin. Although Guan-Yin is a Buddhist goddess, Taoists associate her with fertility, and her image can be found in nearly every Taoist temple. This particular statue is famous because of the smiling, benevolent expression on her face. Her eyes are slightly downcast, and appear to be looking at the visitors.

On either side of the Guan Yin Temple there is a row of 9 Buddhist monks, called “18 arhats”, who are the protectors of Buddhist gods.

=== The Examination Gods ===
Outside the Guan-Yin temple, and to the left, is the temple of the five examination gods, where students and examinees pray for good luck in examinations. The students and examinees write their names, and the time and place of their examination on slip of pink paper. If they pass the exam or get an acceptable grade in the exam, they will often come back and hang a red string decoration as a sign of gratitude, or worship and present flowers and fresh fruit in appreciation.

=== Yue Lao Temple ===
Yuelao Hall

On the opposite side of the Guanyin temple is the “Yue Lao” temple. Single people visit here and pray for luck to find their soul mate: if successful, they usually bring wedding cake and fruit to the temple in appreciation.

=== Read Courtyard ===
Behind the Guanyin temple is a small courtyard, and to the right of the courtyard is the temple where the god of fire is worshiped. Every Saturday, a traditional Chinese music group used to practice and perform traditional Chinese music here. This courtyard also contains a small fish pond: Small goldfish are often kept in Taoist temples because they are believed to bring prosperity (gold=money) to the people. A plum tree is reputed to be more than 300 years old, and in the old days people would sit beneath it and compose poetry, play musical instruments, or enjoy wine in its shade.

=== Ma Shi Ye (The Horse God Temple) ===
Nearly every Guan-Gong Temple has a horse–god temple associated with it. The horse-god temple for this temple is located across the Yong-Fu Road, where the road curves opposite the entrance to the Guan-Gong temple. The horse-god takes the form of a soldier who looks after the horses. Because Guan-Gong was always assisted in his work by horses, his followers built this temple to show their respect and appreciation.

== See also ==
- Martial Temple
- Wen Wu temple
- Beiji Temple
- Grand Matsu Temple
- Taiwan Confucian Temple
- Madou Daitian Temple
- Temple of the Five Concubines
- List of temples in Taiwan
