= Former Tainan Weather Observatory =

Weather station in West Central, Tainan, Taiwan

- 原台南測候所
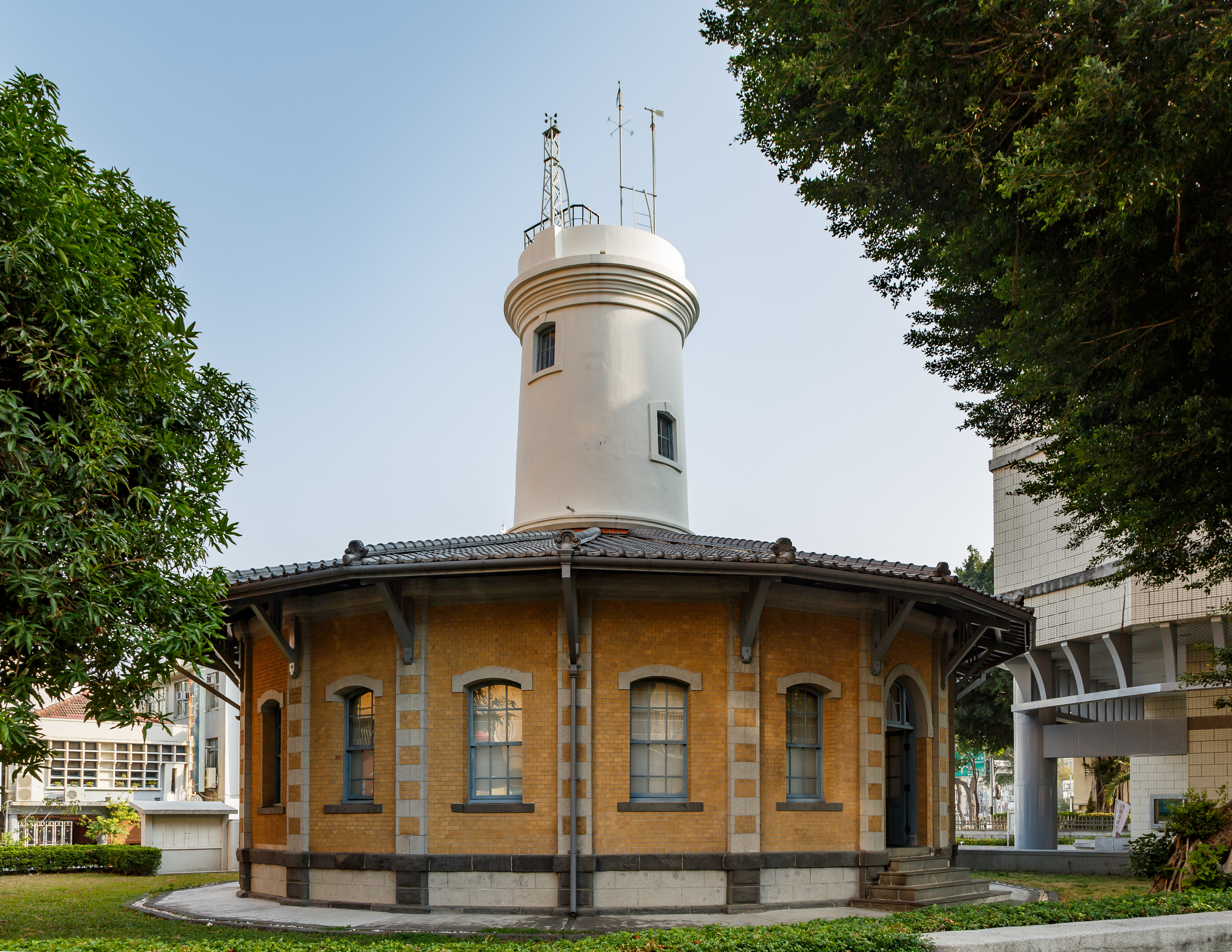
- Interactive map of the Former Tainan Weather Observatory area

General information
- Type: former weather station
- Location: West Central, Tainan, Taiwan
- Coordinates: 22°59′37.3″N 120°12′18.2″E
- Opened: 1897

The Former Tainan Weather Observatory (traditional Chinese: 原台南測候所; simplified Chinese: 原台南测候所; pinyin: Yuán Táinán Cèhòu Suǒ) is a former weather station in West Central District, Tainan, Taiwan.

== History ==
The weather station was built in 1897 during the Japanese rule of Taiwan. For a very long time, the building had been remained unused. The Tainan City Government designated it a municipal historic site in 1998, and it became a national historic site in 2003. It later opened as a museum, and was closed for six months to repair damage from the 2016 southern Taiwan earthquake. On 31 March 2019, it was reopened to the public.

== Architecture ==
The building has a round structure following three concentric circles with offices on the outside, tower access on the inside and a circular hallway running between them. The top of the tower contains the exterior instruments.

== Transportation ==
The building is accessible within walking distance south west of Tainan Station of Taiwan Railway.

== See also ==
- List of tourist attractions in Taiwan
