= Duiyue Gate =

Gate in West Central, Tainan, Taiwan

- 兌悅門
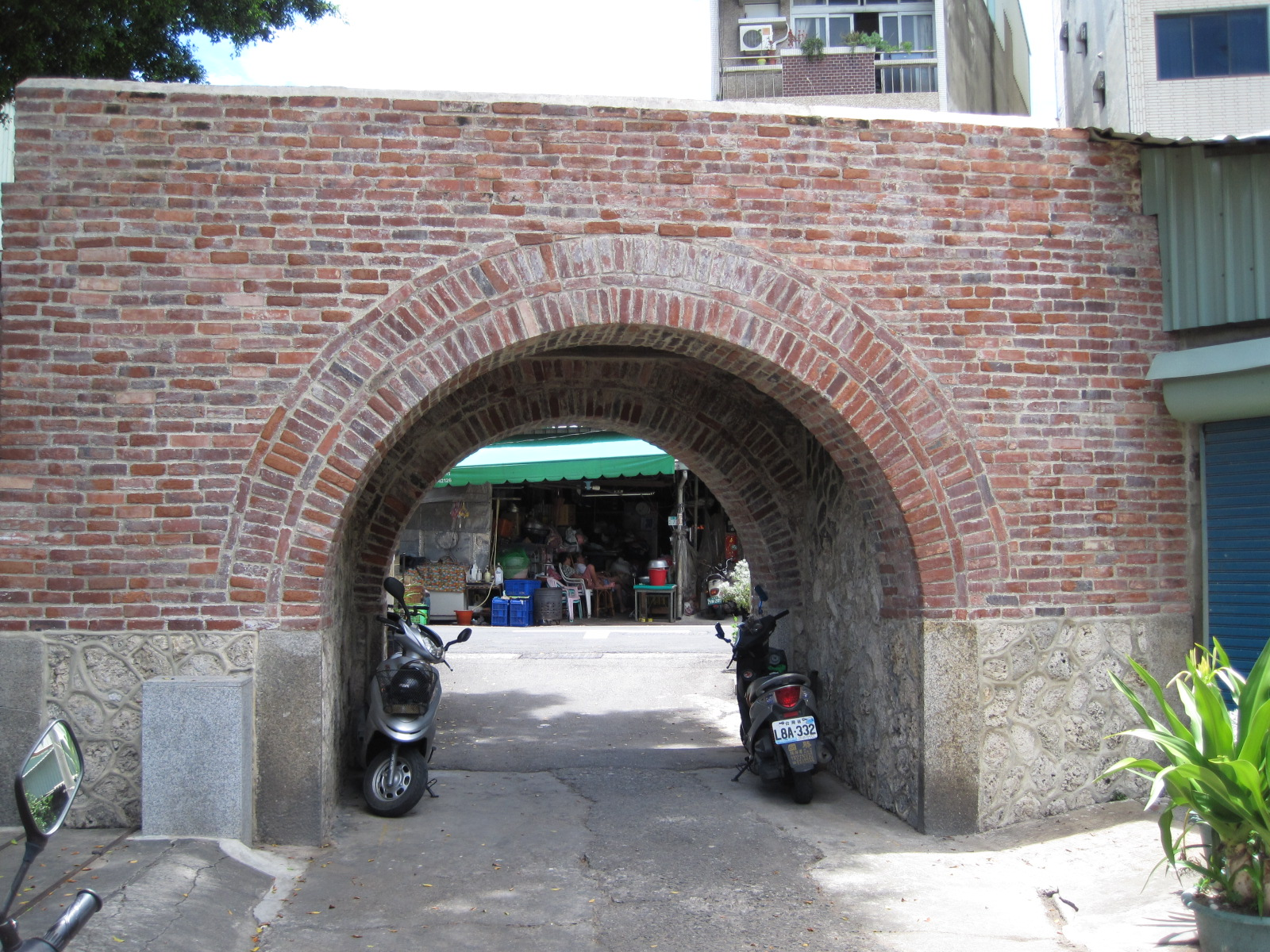
- Interactive map of the Duiyue Gate area
- Alternative names: Laoshi City Gate, Laogu Stone Urn City Wall

General information
- Type: historical gate
- Location: West Central, Tainan, Taiwan
- Coordinates: 23°00′02.7″N 120°11′40.0″E
- Construction started: 1835
- Completed: January 1836

Height
- Height: 4 m (13 ft)

The Duiyue Gate (traditional Chinese: 兌悅門; simplified Chinese: 兑悦门; pinyin: Duìyuè Mén) or Laoshi City Gate and Laogu Stone Urn City Wall is a historical gate in West Central District, Tainan, Taiwan.

== Name ==
The name Duiyue comes from the direction of Dui of Bagua diagram.

== History ==
The construction of the gate started in 1835 and was completed in January 1836 during Qing Dynasty rule. It was part of the three gates built during the expansion of Tainan westward towards the Taiwan Strait by building outer walls for the defense of the town from Qing Dynasty after the Revolt of Jhang Bing in 1832.

== Architecture ==
The base of the gate was built using cut coral stones, therefore earning the nickname Coral Stone Outer Gate. It is constructed with red bricks with 4 meters in height and 3 meters in width. The entrance gate is 3 meters in width with a round arch at its top. There is also a staircase inside the gate to access the top of the wall.

== See also ==
- List of tourist attractions in Taiwan
