= National Tainan Junior College of Nursing =

Junior college in West Central, Tainan, Taiwan

- 國立臺南護理專科學校
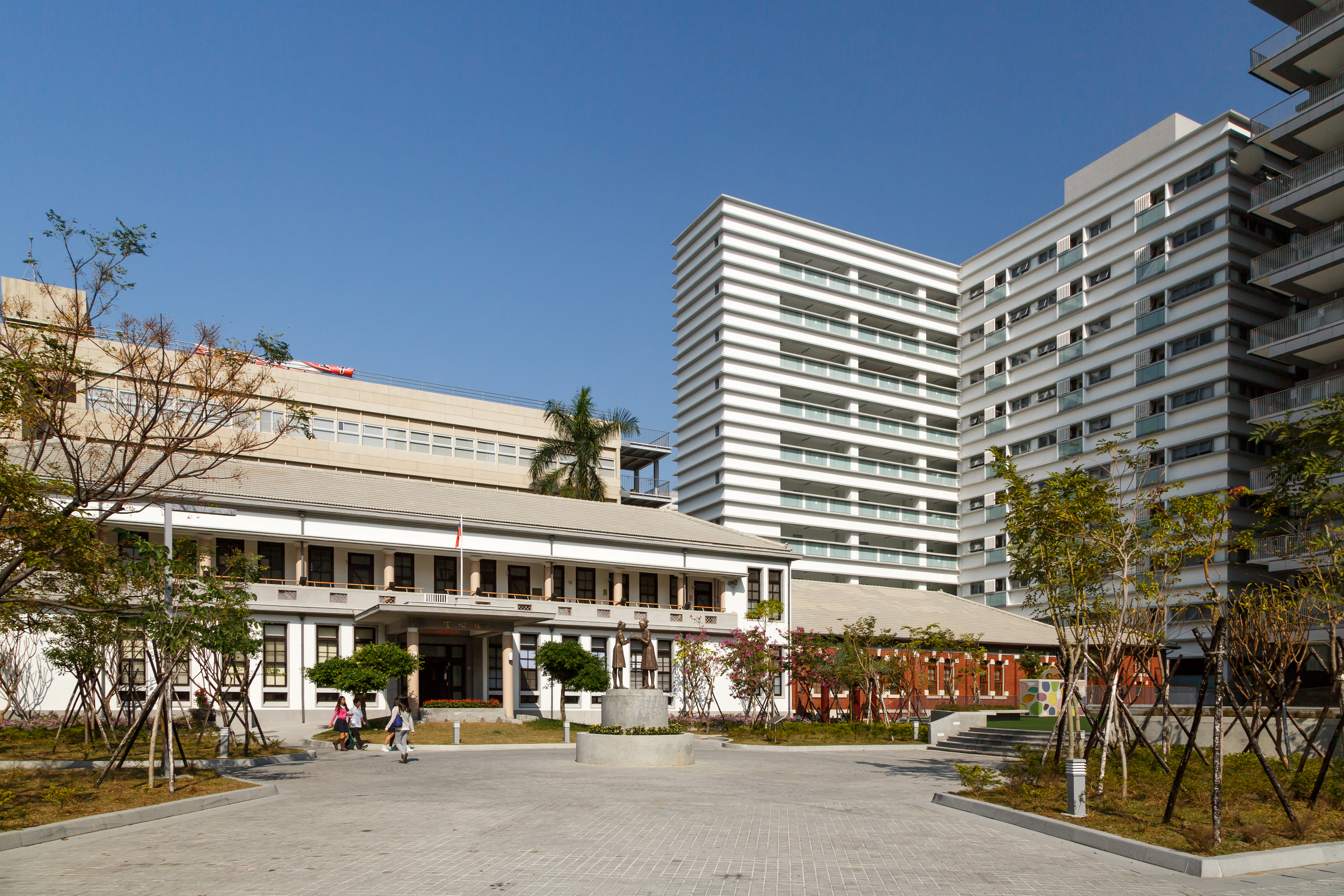
- Former names: Training Preparation Class of Medical Workers in the Southern Taiwan(1952)
- Type: Public College
- Established: June 1952 (as Training Preparation Class of Medical Workers in the Southern Taiwan); 1 August 2000 (as NTIN)
- Affiliations: Ministry of Education Republic of China (Taiwan)
- Location: West Central, Tainan, Taiwan; 22.9954°N 120.2073°E
- Website: Official website

National Tainan Junior College of Nursing
- Traditional Chinese: 國立臺南護理專科學校
Transcriptions
Standard Mandarin
- Hanyu Pinyin: Zhēngxiū Kējì Dàxué
Southern Min
- Hokkien POJ: Kok-li̍p Tâi-lâm Hō͘-lí Choan-kho Ha̍k-hāu

National Tainan Institute of Nursing; National Tainan Junior College of Nursing (NTJCN; Chinese: 國立臺南護理專科學校; Pe̍h-ōe-jī: Kok-li̍p Tâi-lâm Hō͘-lí Choan-kho Ha̍k-hāu) is a public college in West Central, Tainan, Taiwan.

NTJCN offers several academic programs, including a two-year Associate Degree in Nursing (ADN) program and a four-year Bachelor of Science in Nursing (BSN) program. The courses cover a wide range of topics, including anatomy, physiology, pharmacology, nursing ethics, patient care, and community health.

== History ==
NTIN was founded as the Training Preparation Class of Medical Workers in Southern Taiwan in June 1952. In August 1953, it was renamed, the Taiwan Provincial Tainan Vocational High School of Nursing.

It was upgraded to National Tainan Institute of Nursing on 1 August 2000.

== Faculties ==
- Humanism and Society Science
- Natural and Foundational Medical Science
- Department of Nursing
- Clinical Teacher

== Academics ==
- The academic curriculum offered at NTIN includes the following courses:
  - Fundamentals of Nursing Group
  - Medical and Surgical Nursing Group
  - Maternity and Pediatrics Nursing Group
  - Public Health and Psychiatric Nursing Group
  - Basic Medical Science Group

=== Nursing curriculum ===
A student who attends the nursing school will have the following courses:

1. General education courses: Chinese, English, chemistry, music, drama, art, etc.
2. Professional foundation courses: nutriology, psychology, anatomy, physiology, microbiology, pharmacology, physical assessment, and related experimental courses.
3. Professional core courses: fundamental nursing, medical-surgical nursing, maternal-newborn nursing, pediatric nursing, psychiatric nursing, public health nursing, and experimental and practical courses of all nursing branches.
4. Professional required and elective courses formulated by the school: long-term care, geriatric care, hospice care, critical care, emergency care, rehabilitation care, clinical test data interpretation, Chinese medical science, and related pragmatic courses that are required or elective.
5. Required and elective general knowledge courses: computer, sports and leisure, livelihood esthetics, thanatology (death studies), introduction to environmental protection science, English conversation, career planning, etc.
6. Clinical Practical Training: On-site (or clinical) practical training places consist of the subsidiary medical centre of NCKU, CHI-MEI medical centre, Tainan city hospital, SINLAU hospital, Jianan Psychiatric Centre, Tainan Hospital, KUO general hospital in Tainan, the public health centre of Tainan city, etc.

== Simulation in nursing and midwifery education ==
=== Characteristic Teaching Center ===
1. Multimedia Audiovisual Teaching Center of Medical-Surgical Nursing and Critical Care Nursing
  The Multimedia Audiovisual Teaching Center was established to promote the quality of medical-surgical nursing. It consists of the modern demonstration wards, critical care units, advanced simulators, modern medical equipment, and various teaching aids which are used to train the students efficiently and enhance the students' abilities to take care of patients. There is also audiovisual equipment for students to participate in self-guided learning. Students in the center learn to perform medical-surgical nursing skills, such as the practice of under-water seal drainage, colostomy care skills, and assessments of cardiopulmonary function.
2. Division of Basic Medical Science
  The Division of Basic Medical Science of NTIN is responsible for teaching and training students to study basic medical science, which encompasses Biology, Human Anatomy, Physiology, Pathology, Pharmacology, Microbiology, Molecular Biology and Immunology. Research facilities and equipment such as human tissue slides, modules, microtome, flow cytometry, and protein 2D-system. The division also hosts and annual Teenagers' Biomedical Summer Camp.
3. Maternal-Child Education Center
  This center was established to improve the quality of teaching in maternal care and childcare. Here, students learn relevant concepts such as breastfeeding, contraceptives, and physical assessment for perinatal mothers and newborns.
4. Holistic Health Care Demonstration Center
  The nursing school's Holistic Health Care Demonstration Center is mainly concerned with aging. Students can undergo a simulated aging experience and training in issues such as housing for the elderly, an exercise program for psychomotor function with visual aids, and long-term care demonstrations.
5. The Center for Health Promotion and Education
  The National Tainan Institute of Nursing's Center of Health Promotion and Education was established in 2002 for courses that require demonstrations as well as research associated with health promotion.The Center houses equipment for health-related physical fitness tests, multimedia health education, and general health promotion.

== See also ==
- List of universities in Taiwan
