= National Tainan Living Arts Center =

Art center in West Central, Tainan, Taiwan

- 國立台南生活美學館
- Interactive map of National Tainan Living Arts Center
- Location: West Central, Tainan, Taiwan
- Coordinates: 22°59′31.5″N 120°11′15.5″E
- Capacity: 838 seats (performance hall); 288 seats (medium and small conference rooms)
- Type: arts center

Construction
- Opened: 11 June 1955

Website
- Official website

The National Tainan Living Arts Center (traditional Chinese: 國立台南生活美學館; simplified Chinese: 国立台南生活美学; pinyin: Guólì Táinán Shēnghuó Měixuéguǎn) is an arts center in West Central District, Tainan, Taiwan. It handles the cultural-related affairs among communities for the counties in southern Taiwan.

== History ==
The center was originally initiated in early 1954 as the Provincial Tainan Social Education Hall by the Taiwan Provincial Government. In June 1954, the preparatory committee was established. On 11 June 1955, it was officially established. It was located in the former Tainan Public Hall during the Japanese rule of Taiwan, with a site area of 0.6 hectares. Over the time, due to the limited space, the education department of the provincial government established a new site for the center on 15 March 1989. The new site occupied a total area of 2.52 hectares and was located at the 5th Redevelopment Zone of Tainan. The first phase of construction commenced in 1992 and was completed in February 1994, in which the administration hall was constructed. In July 1994, the personnel of the center moved to the new venue. On 29 October 1994, the new site was officially inaugurated. The second phase of construction started in January 1995 and finished in December 1998, which saw the completion of the performance and exhibition hall. On 15 May 1997, the Culture and Education Division of the provincial government was formed and the center became a subordinate of the division. On 1 July 1999, the center became a subordinate of the Ministry of Education. On 19 September 2007, the Research, Development and Evaluation Commission proposed an adjustment to the management of the center that it would become a subordinate of Council for Cultural Affairs. On 23 January 2008, the Executive Yuan approved the proposal. The center was then later inaugurated as National Tainan Living Arts Center on 6 March 2008. On 18 May 2012, the Executive Yuan issued a mandate to make the center become a subordinate of National Taiwan Museum of Fine Arts and was approved on 25 May 2012.

== Architecture ==
The art center consists of an 838-seated capacity performance hall for cultural and artistic events and 7 medium and small conference rooms with a total seating capacity of 288 people for conference or meeting-style events.

== Events ==
The art center regularly hosts various art-related events, such as culture and art forums, life crafts workshops, life crafts and folklore exhibition and performance etc.

== Transportation ==
The art center is accessible by bus from Tainan Station of Taiwan Railway.

== See also ==
- List of tourist attractions in Taiwan
