= Great South Gate =

Gate in West Central, Tainan, Taiwan

- 府城大南門
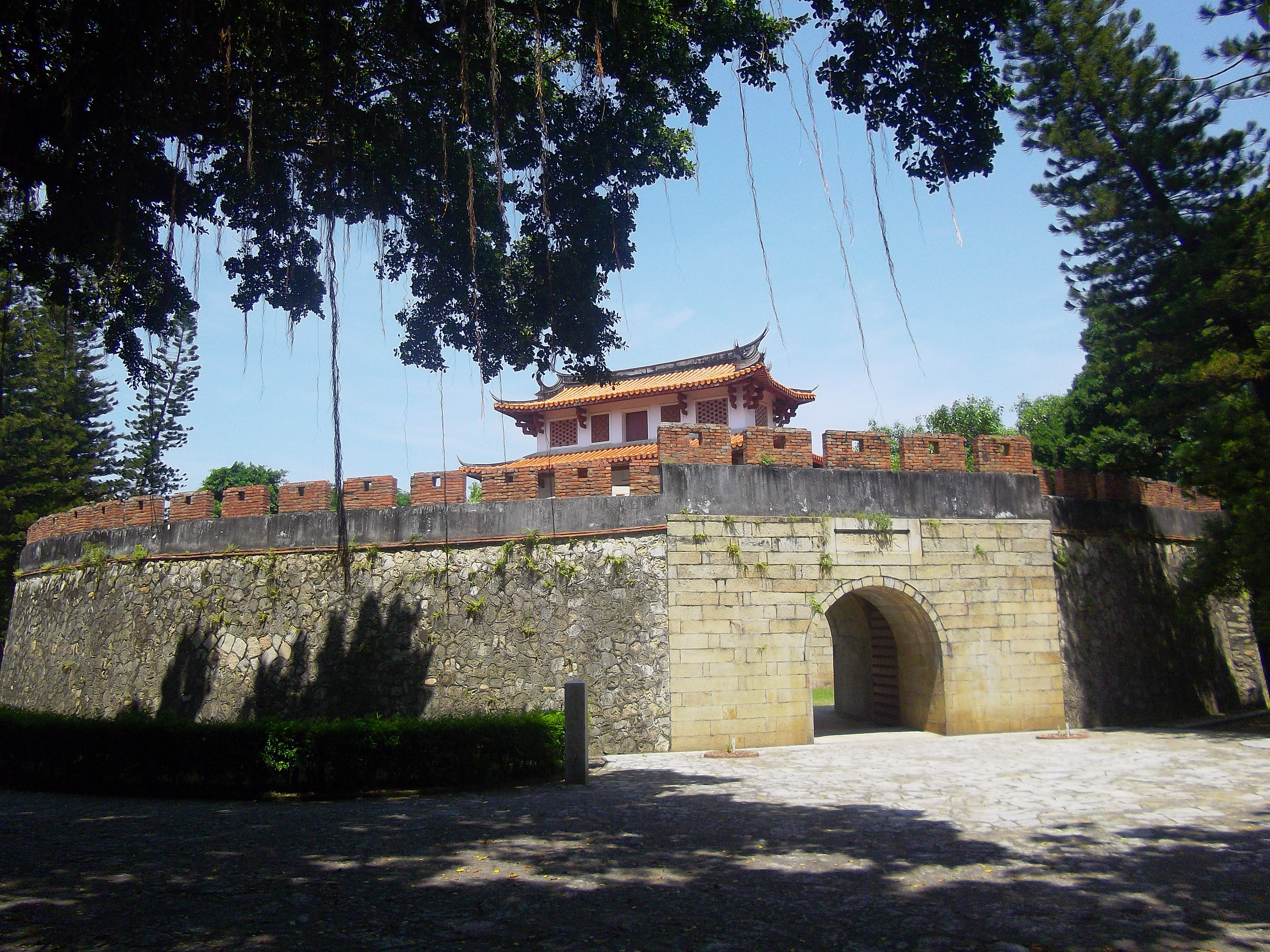
- Interactive map of the Great South Gate area

General information
- Type: historical gate
- Location: West Central, Tainan, Taiwan
- Coordinates: 22°59′12.8″N 120°12′12.7″E
- Completed: 1736

The Great South Gate (traditional Chinese: 府城大南門; simplified Chinese: 府城大南门; pinyin: Fǔchéng Dà Nán Mén) is a historical gate in West Central District, Tainan, Taiwan.

== History ==
The Great South Gate is part of the original 14 gates of Tainan City Wall built in 1736. The gates were constructed to fend off barbarians from attacking the town.

== Architecture ==
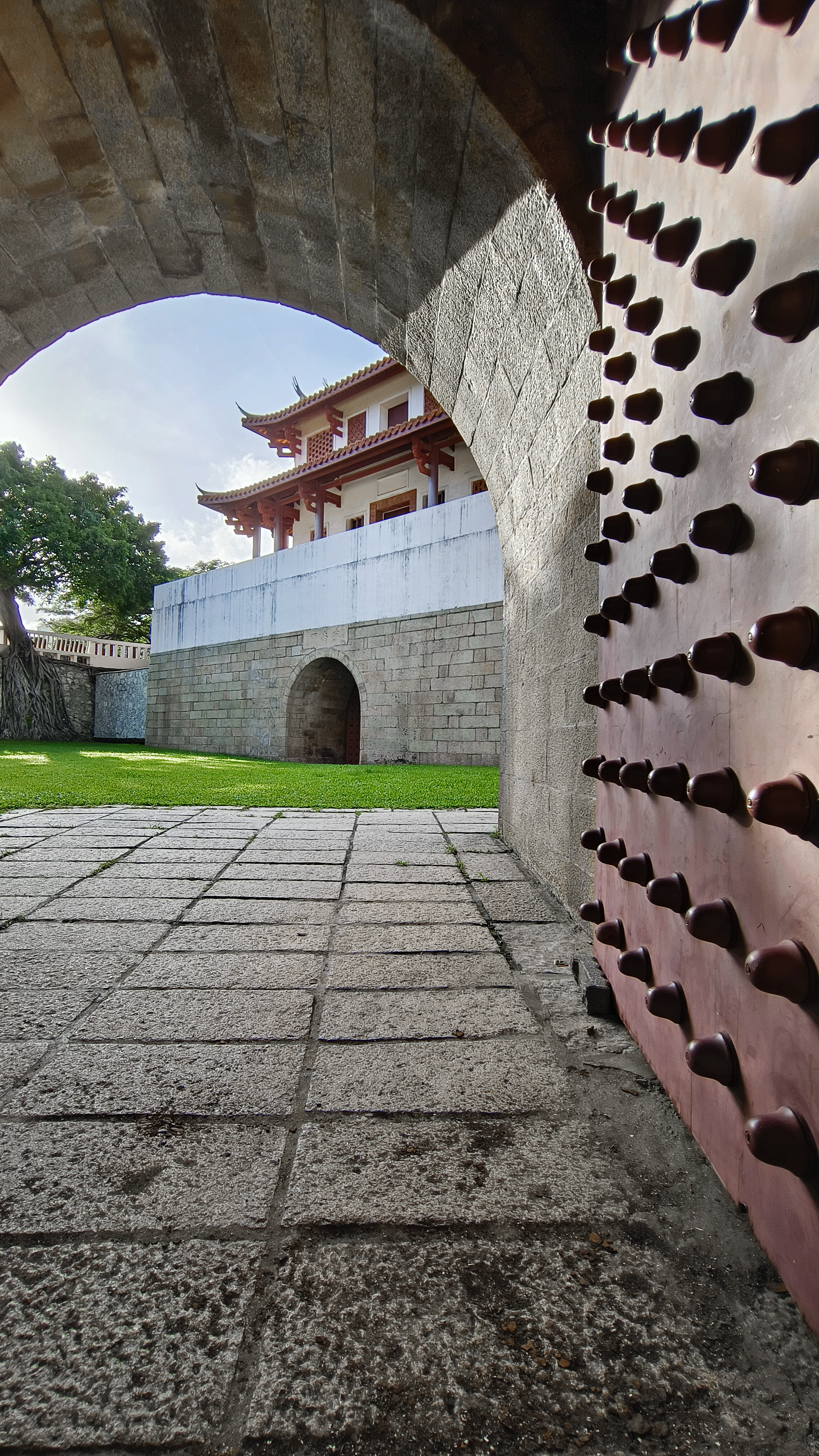
Great South Gate

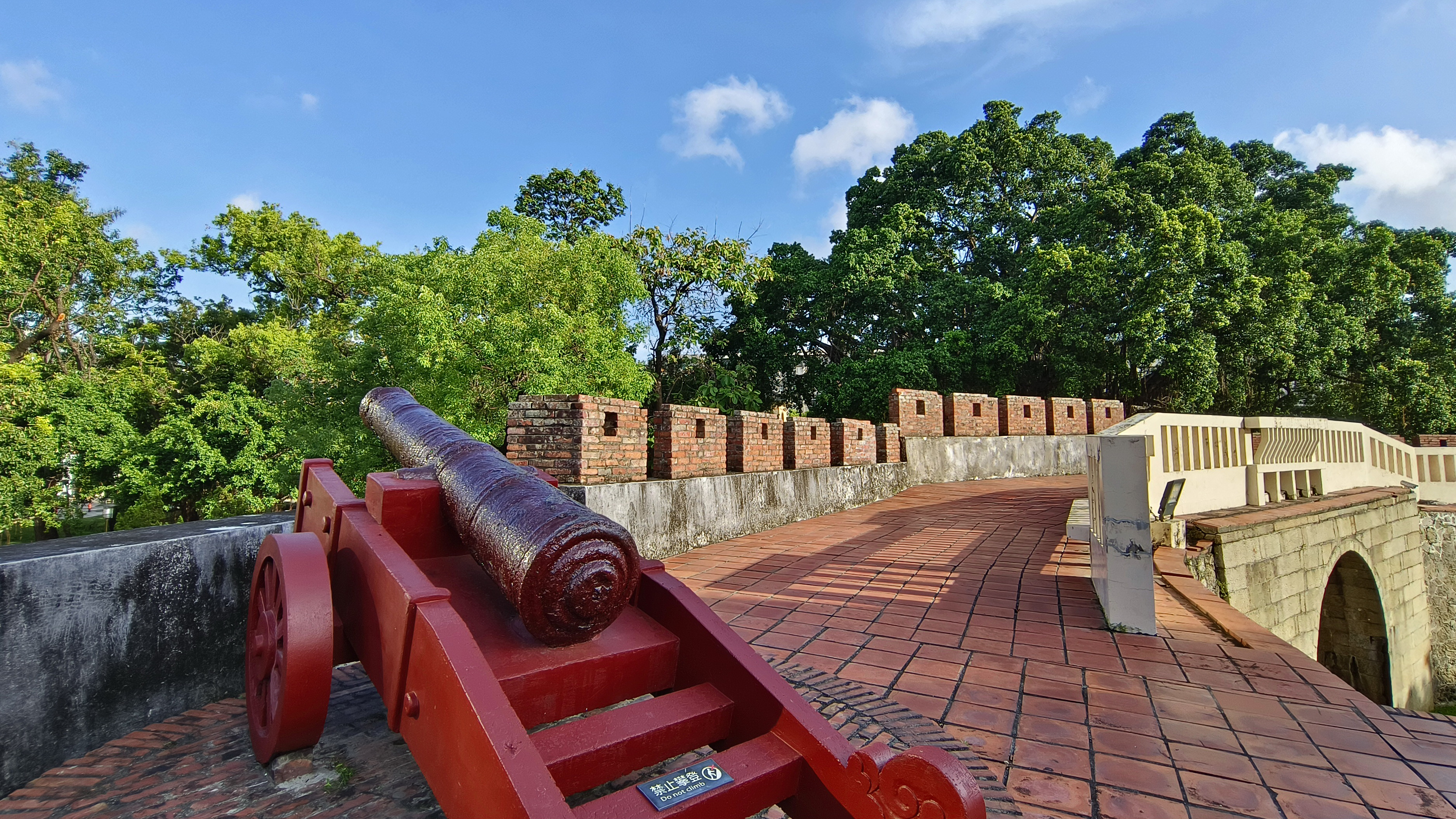
Great South Gate, Cannon

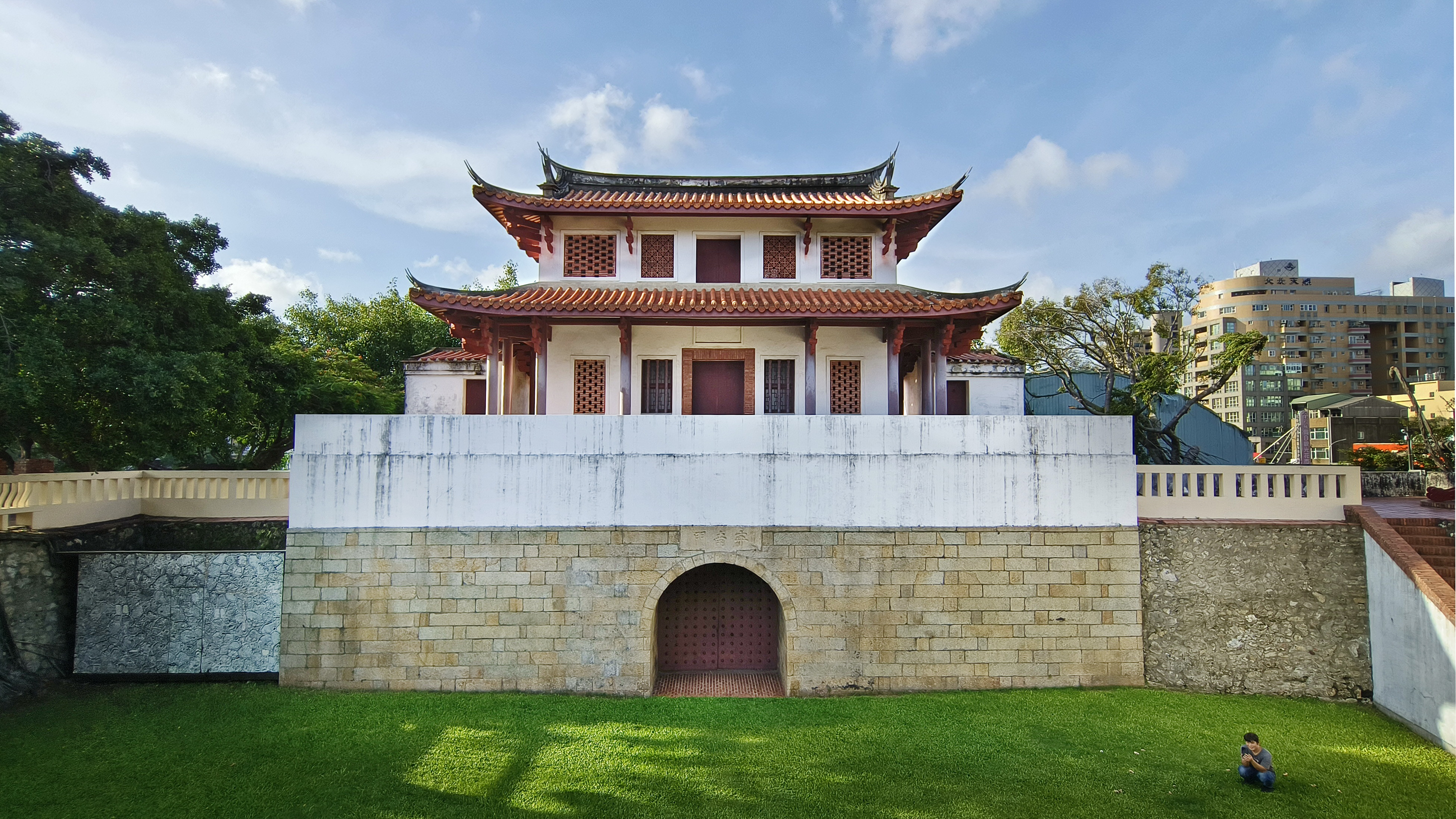
Great South Gate

The gate has an outer arched fate in the shape of half moon. It was set at an angle to the inner gate because of security considerations.

== See also ==
- List of tourist attractions in Taiwan
