= West Central District =

Coordinates: 22°59′47.3″N 120°11′38″E

West Central 中西區
- District
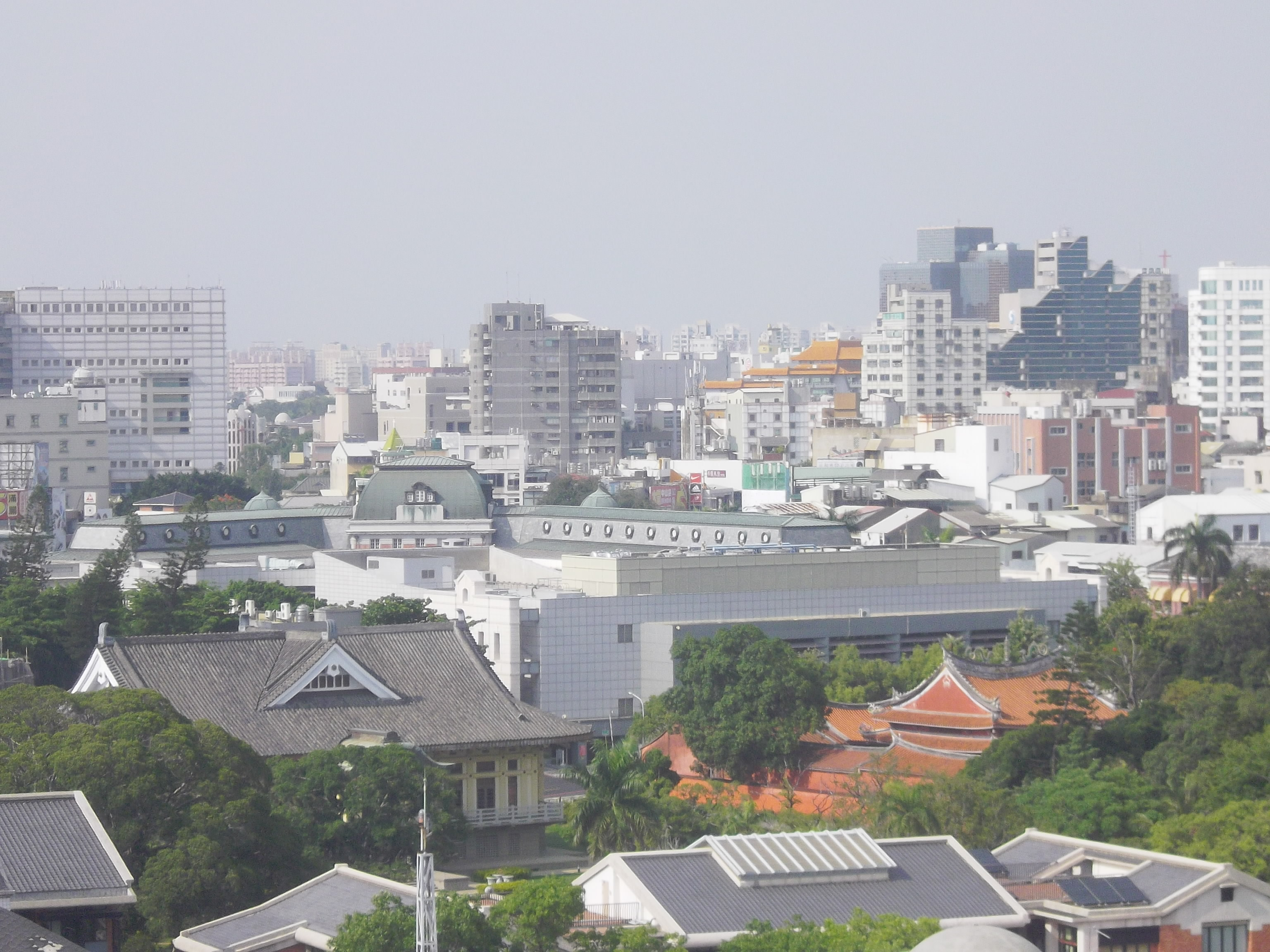

- West Central District in Tainan City
- Country: Taiwan
- Special municipality: Tainan
- Formation: 1 April 2004

Government
  - Type: District government
  - District Chief: Chen Sheng-nan
- Time zone: UTC+8 (National Standard Time)
- Website: web.tainan.gov.tw/tnwcdo_en/

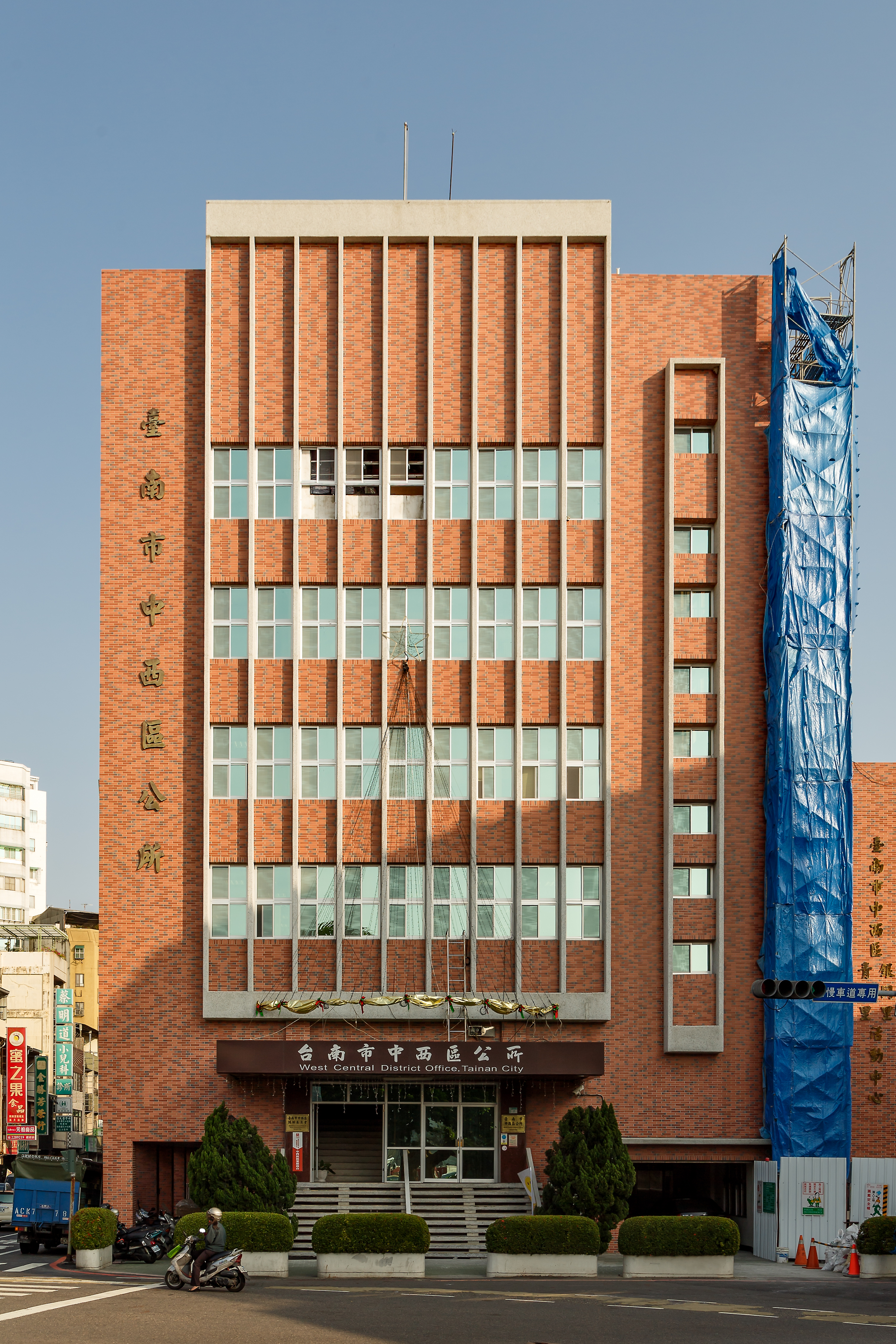
West Central District Office

West Central District (Chinese: 中西區; pinyin: Zhōngxī Qū; Wade–Giles: Chung-hsi Ch'ü; Pe̍h-ōe-jī: Tiong-se-khu) is a district located in the center of Tainan City, Taiwan. It is home to 76,983 people.

== History ==
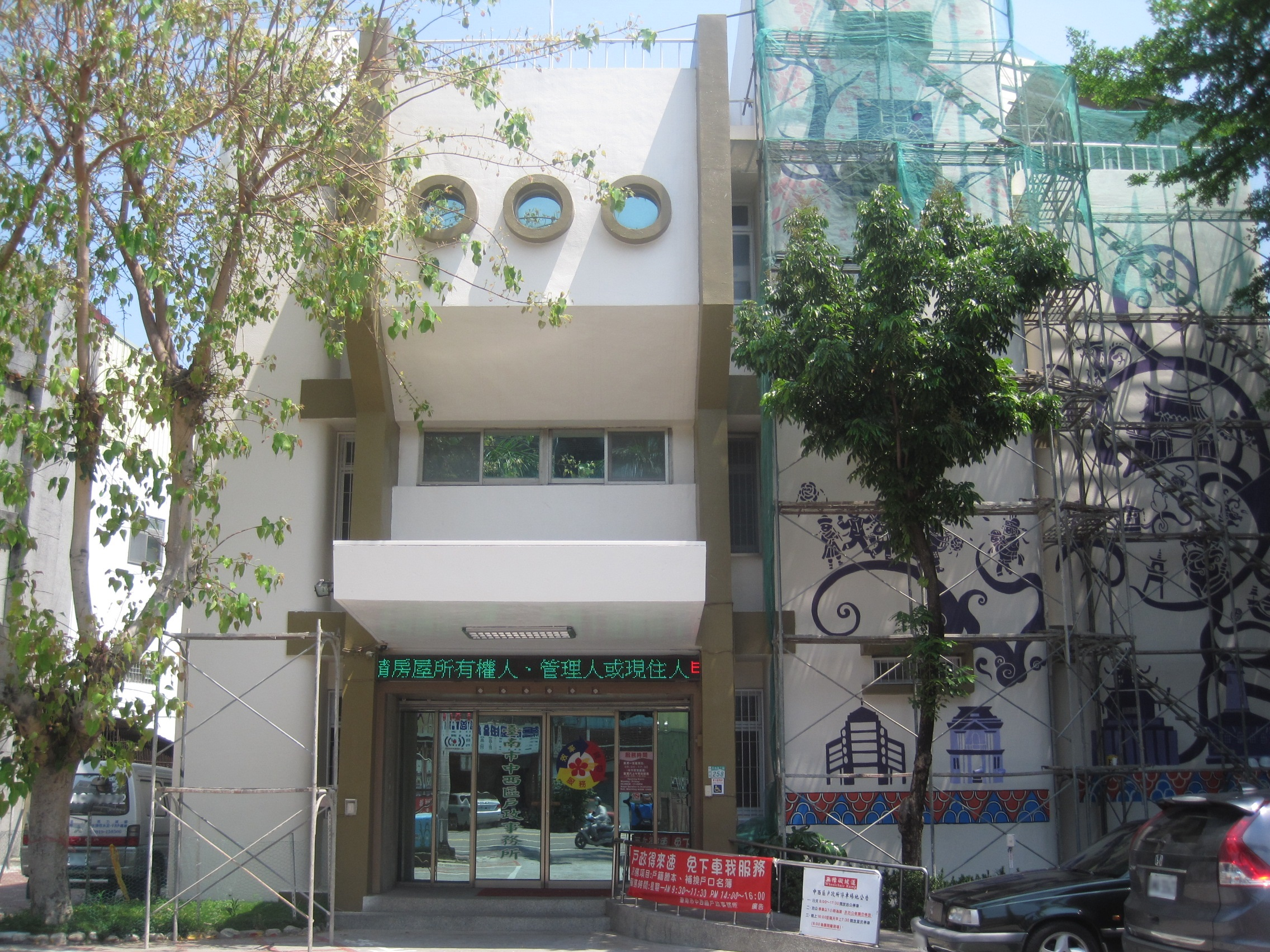
Former West District Office

The district was founded on 1 January 2004, which merged with West District and Central District.

This district was the capital of Taiwan for approximately 200 years. Its history can be traced back 300 years.

== Administrative divisions ==
The district consists of Chikan, Junwang, Fahua, Kaishan, Yonghua, Yaowang, Guangxian, Daliang, Xihu, Xixian, Chenghuang, Nanmei, Nanmen, Xiaoximen, Wutiaogang, Duiyue, Qiancao, Fuqian, Nanchang and Xihe Village.

== Education ==
- National University of Tainan (Main Campus)
- National Tainan Junior College of Nursing

== Tourist attractions ==
- Beiji Temple
- Bo Yang Museum
- Chih-kan Cultural Area
- Chin Men Theater
- Duiyue Gate
- Five Harbors
- Former Tainan Assembly Hall
- Former Tainan Weather Observatory
- Fort Provintia
- Grand Matsu Temple
- Great South Gate
- Hai'an Road Art Street
- Hayashi Department Store
- Kaiji Wu Temple
- Kongmiao Shopping District
- Koxinga Ancestral Shrine
- Mingshen Garden
- National Museum of Taiwan Literature
- National Tainan Living Arts Center
- Sanguan Temple
- Shennong Street
- Shuixian Gong Market
- Snail Alley
- State Temple of the Martial God
- Tainan Art Museum
- Tainan Confucian Temple
- Tainan Film Center
- Tainan Judicial Museum
- Tainan Wude Hall
- Tainan Wu Garden
- Taiwan Confucian Temple
- Tang Te-chang Memorial Park
- Temple of the Five Concubines
- Wusheng Night Market
- Yongle Market
- Yeh Shih-tao Literature Memorial Hall

== Transportation ==
The district is served by Provincial Highways 17, 17A, and 20. City Route 182 passes through the district. the Tainan railway station is located nearby.

== Notable natives ==
- Shara Lin, musician, actress, singer, and television host

== See also ==
- Tainan
