= Tainan Art Museum =

Museum in West Central, Tainan, Taiwan

- 臺南市美術館
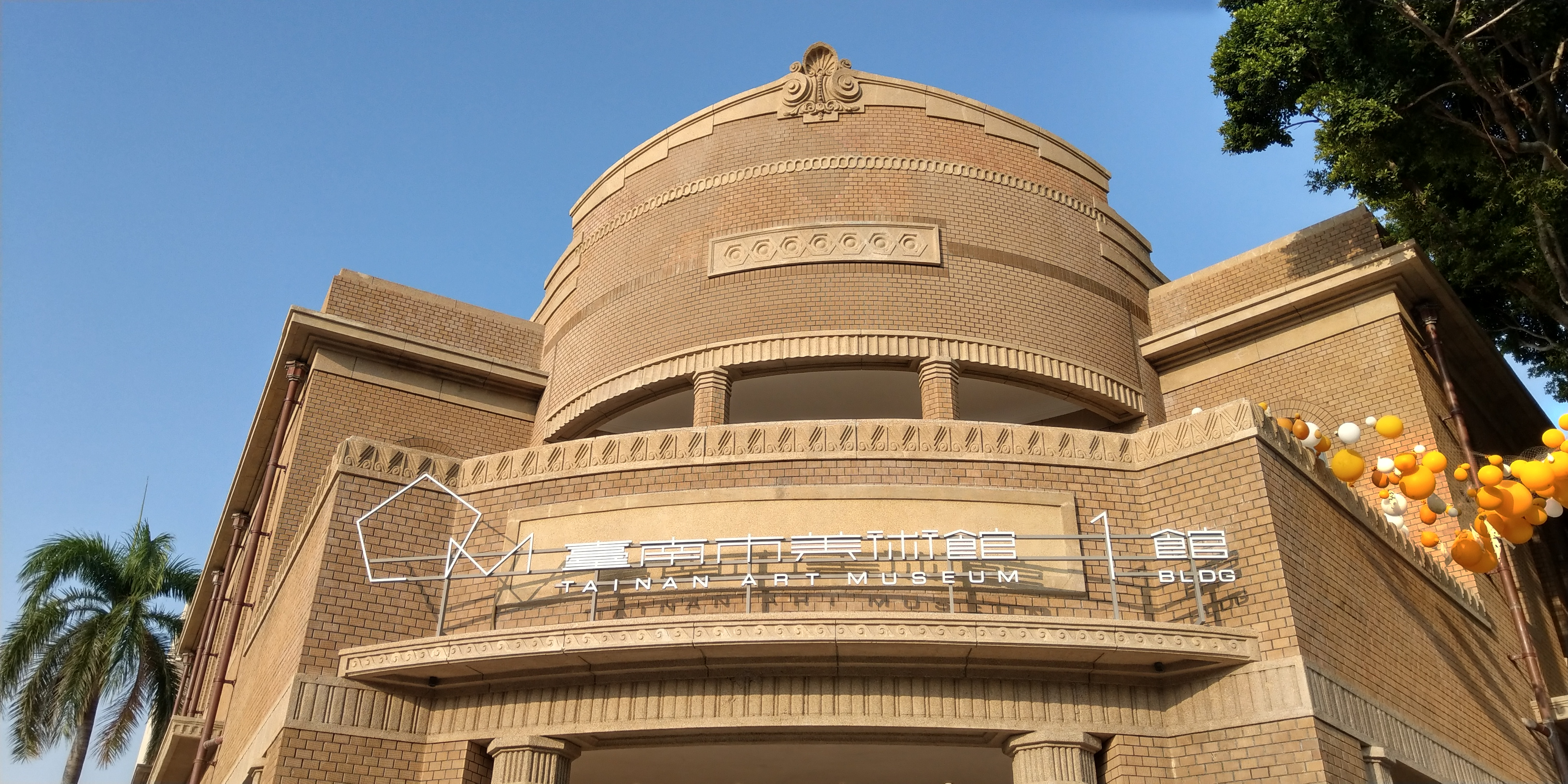
- Tainan Art Museum building 1
- Former name: Tainan Police Department; Tainan City Police Department
- Established: 27 January 2019
- Location: West Central, Tainan, Taiwan
- Coordinates: 22°59′26.9″N 120°12′13.1″E
- Type: art museum
- Director: Pan Kai (潘襎)
- Architects: Sutejiro Umezawa (building 1); Shi Zhao Yong, Shigeru Ban (building 2)
- Public transit access: Tainan Station
- Website: Official website (in Chinese)

The Tainan Art Museum (TAM; traditional Chinese: 臺南市美術館; simplified Chinese: 台南市美术馆; pinyin: Táinán Shì Měishùguǎn) is an art museum in West Central District, Tainan, Taiwan.

== History ==
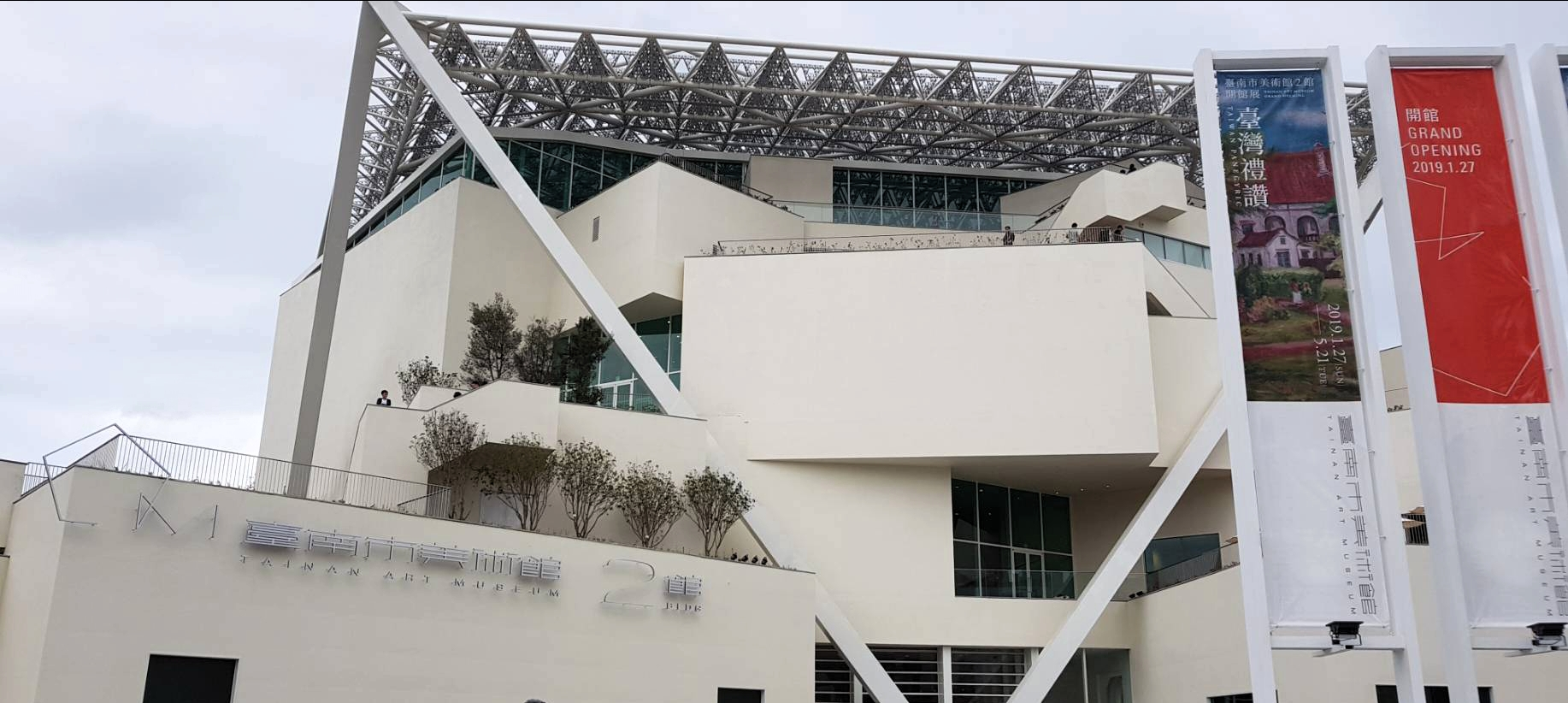
Tainan Art Museum building 2

Planning for the museum began in 2010. The museum was opened to the public on 27 January 2019 with some exhibitions opened in October 2018. The museum's founding chairperson, the artist Chen Huei-dung, died on 1 November 2024 at the age of 86.

== Architecture ==
The museum consists of two main buildings. The museum building 1 was constructed with ochre yellow tiles in Art Deco architecture style. It spans over an area of 1,024 m^{2}. It was designed by Sutejiro Umezawa. The building was constructed in 1930 originally as the Tainan Police Department. It is the earliest existing police station building in Taiwan. After the handover of Taiwan from Japan to the Republic of China in 1945, it was renamed to Tainan City Police Department. The police department moved out of the building in 2011.

The museum houses multipurpose theater, children's art center, artist exclusive gallery, collection, restoration and an art research center, the first of its kind in Taiwan.

The museum building 1 consists of 16 galleries and the museum building 2 consists of 17 galleries. The museum building 2 spans over an area of 2,960 m^{2}. It was designed by Shi Zhao Yong and Shigeru Ban. The building was designed with the shape of Delonix regia.

== Transportation ==
The museum is accessible within walking distance southwest of Tainan Station of Taiwan Railway.

== See also ==
- List of museums in Taiwan
