= Tainan Film Center =

Theater in West Central, Tainan, Taiwan

- 臺南市南門電影書院
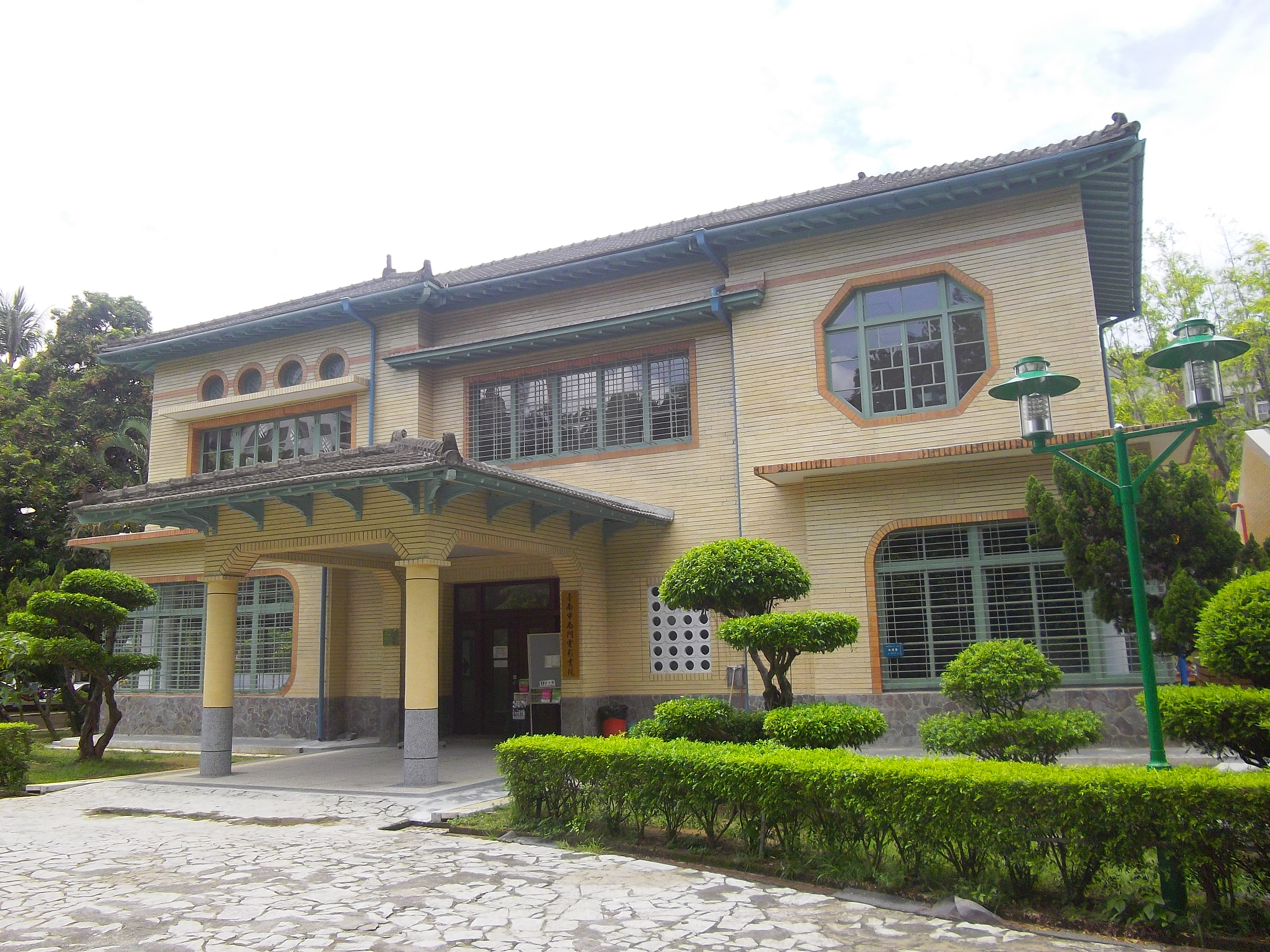
- Interactive map of Tainan Film Center
- Location: West Central, Tainan, Taiwan
- Coordinates: 22°59′10.6″N 120°12′13.7″E
- Owner: Tainan National University of the Arts
- Operator: Tainan National University of the Arts
- Type: movie theater

Construction
- Built: 1932
- Opened: 2002

The Tainan Film Center (traditional Chinese: 臺南市南門電影書院; simplified Chinese: 台南市南门电影书院; pinyin: Táinán Shì Nánmén Diànyǐng Shūyuàn) is a movie theater in West Central District, Tainan, Taiwan. The center is operated by the College of Sound and Image Arts of Tainan National University of the Arts.

== History ==
The building was originally constructed in 1932 as the Old Tainan Broadcasting Station as the southernmost radio station of Taiwan Hōsō Kyōkai during the Japanese rule of Taiwan. In 2001, the building was designated as historical monument by the Tainan City Government and converted into the Tainan Film Center in 2012.

== Events ==
The center regularly holds various cinema-related events such as film screenings, film exhibitions, conducting film-making courses and media literacy, film preservation promotions etc.

== See also ==
- Cinema of Taiwan
