= Zhu Shugui =

Chinese prince (1617–1683)

Zhu Shugui 朱術桂
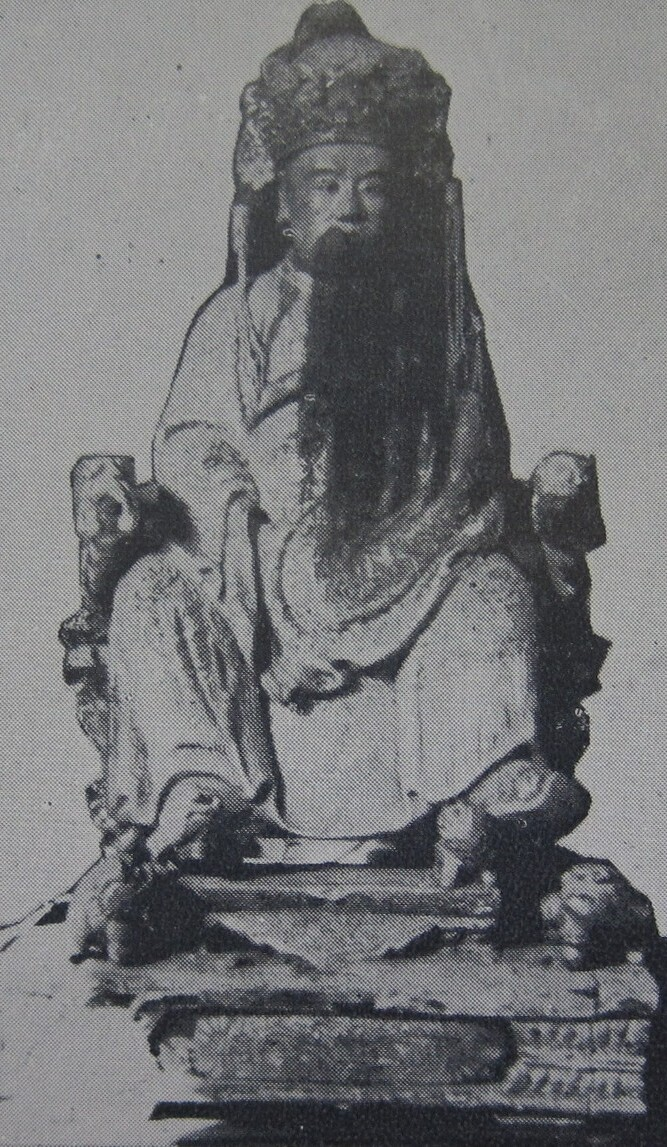

Prince of Ningjing
- Tenure: 1646–1683
- Born: 24 October 1617
- Died: 21 July 1683 (aged 65)
- Burial: Ningjing Prince's Tomb
- Spouse: Consort Luo
Names
- Zhu Shugui (朱術桂)
- House: Zhu (Prince of Liao's line)
- Dynasty: Ming
- Father: Zhu Xianhuan, Prince of Changyang

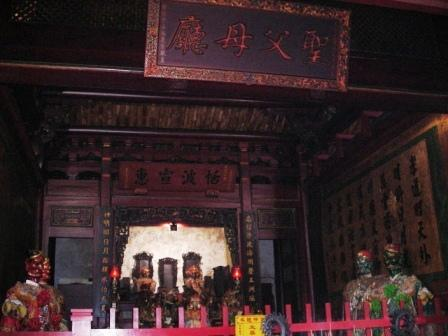
Prince of Ningjing bedroom, now part of the Grand Matsu Temple in Tainan.

Zhu Shugui (1617 – 21 July 1683), courtesy name Tianqiu (天球) and art name Yiyuanzi (一元子), the Prince of Ningjing (寧靖王), was a royal member of the Ming and the last of the pretenders to the throne of Southern Ming after the execution of the Yongli Emperor in 1662. He took shelter to the Kingdom of Tungning in Taiwan after mainland China completely fell under the control of Manchu-led Qing dynasty. Despite his status as a royal member, he virtually shared no political power with the Zheng dynasts whom were the actual rulers of the kingdom. After the Qing forces successfully annexed Taiwan in 1683, he committed suicide. Nowadays there is a temple dedicated to the prince in Lujhu Township. Inside the temple is written Zhu's death poem.

== Early career ==
Zhu Shugui was the son of Zhu Xianhuan, Prince of Zhangyang, a descendent of prince Zhu Zhi, son of the Hongwu Emperor. He was styled the General Who Assists the State (輔國將軍) while living in Jingzhou. He was later granted the title Prince of Changyang during the Regency of the Prince of Lu near the end of the Ming dynasty. In 1642, after the rebel leader Zhang Xianzhong captured Jingzhou, he followed Zhu Changrun, Prince of Hui, to Nanjing. In 1644, the Chongzhen Emperor, the last emperor of the Ming dynasty, committed suicide in Beijing, and China fell into chaos. But Zhu Shugui, living in Nanjing under the auspices of the Prince of Fu, continued to support the legitimacy of the Ming dynasty.

== Support of anti-Qing forces ==
By 1647, the Manchus had occupied most Chinese territory and founded the Qing dynasty. Zhu Youlang, Prince of Gui, who had proclaimed himself heir to the Ming throne, was alone among the many Ming princes in recognizing the legitimacy of the Kingdom of Tungning that Koxinga had founded in Taiwan. In 1648, Zhu Youlang sent Zhu Shugui to serve as regent for Koxinga's troops, changing his title to Prince of Ningjing. He was stationed in Fujian Province. As a representative of the Ming royal house, he was used by Koxinga as a rallying point to regroup the anti-Qing forces.

== Relocation to Taiwan ==
Koxinga died in 1663, whereupon his son Zheng Jing succeeded him. In 1664, in support of the legitimacy of the Ming dynasty, Zheng Jing invited the Prince of Ningjing to Taiwan. He built a residential mansion for the Prince in the district of Xidingfang, adjacent to Fort Provintia in the city of Chengtian Prefecture (now Tainan), and provided him with a yearly stipend. Taiwan was newly settled territory, boasting fertile lands, and Zhu cleared dozens of hectares of land at Zhuhu Village, Wannian Prefecture (modern-day Lujhu District, Kaohsiung) for farming.

Zheng Jing died in 1681, and his son Zheng Keshuang took his place.

== Final days ==
In 1683 the Qing general Shi Lang took the strategically important Pescadores, after which Zheng Keshuang and the House of Zheng surrendered to the Qing. On the 26th day of the 6th moon of the Chinese lunar calendar (July 20 in the Gregorian calendar), Zhu Shugui, seeing no hope for the restoration of his dynasty, decided to lay down his life. He summoned his concubines and said: "I live abroad with disfavor and strife, longing to spend the hereafter with my royal forefathers in the underworld. Now all is lost, and the day of my death is set. You are young and should make your own plans." The five concubines, who had been by his side since the death of his wife Lady Luo, wept, saying to him: "As the Prince can keep his integrity thus, so would we rather give our lives willingly. If the Prince lives, we all live; if the Prince dies, we all die. We ask that you first grant us a measure of silken cord, that we may follow you in death." Then, one after the other, they hanged themselves in the central hall. The next day, Zhu interred his concubines, in coffins, at Kuidoushan (Cassia Bud Hill), a hillside outside the south gate of the city (the current location of the Temple of the Five Concubines).

Before his death, Zhu wrote on the wall: "When brigands took Jingzhou in 1642, I brought my household southward; in 1644, I took refuge in Fujian. For the sake of the hairs on my head and to preserve the integrity of my humble body, I have lingered abroad for more than 40 years; now I am 66 years old. In this time of adversity I shall die a whole man. I shall not forsake my emperors; I shall not forsake my parents. My life and work are done, without disgrace or shame." The next day, he donned the crown and dragon robes, fastened a jade belt, and received the Imperial seal. The Prince sent a letter under seal to Zheng Keshuang, who then led his officials to the Prince, lamenting their separation. The Prince made obeisance to heaven, earth and ancestors. The people, young and old, paid their respects, and the Prince paid his respects in return. Then on the back of an inkstone he inscribed his death poem, which read: "I take refuge abroad from calamity, all for the sake of a few strands of hair. Now all is done; I shall no longer be in exile." Two of his attendants also died by his side.

The other Ming princes on Taiwan such as Zhu Hónghuán, son of Zhu Yihai, Prince of Lu, chose not to commit suicide and surrendered, and their lives were spared by the Qing and they were instead sent into exile into various places on mainland China.

After the surrender of the Kingdom of Tungning, the Qing sent 17 Ming princes still living on Taiwan back to mainland China where they spent the rest of their lives.

== Burial ==
Zhu Shugui was 66 years old (by Chinese reckoning; 65 by Western standards) at the time of his suicide. Moved by loyalty, the townsfolk interred him together with his primary wife Lady Luo in what is now Hunei Township. At the time there was no marking on the tomb, and over 100 decoy tombs were built to confound the Qing army’s searches.

The tomb, located in Hunei District, Kaohsiung City, was discovered in 1937. At the time of discovery the casket was empty, and the artifacts in the tomb fell into the hands of the Japanese. Although the tomb was empty, the villagers built a square concrete wall around the tomb site to demarcate it. After World War II, the residents of Zhuhu and Hunei funded the tomb's rebuilding, and the decoy tombs were dismantled and assembled into a large tomb. The tomb site you can see today is a reconstruction done by the Kaohsiung County (now part of Kaohsiung City) government in 1977, and in 1988 it was designated a third class historic site.

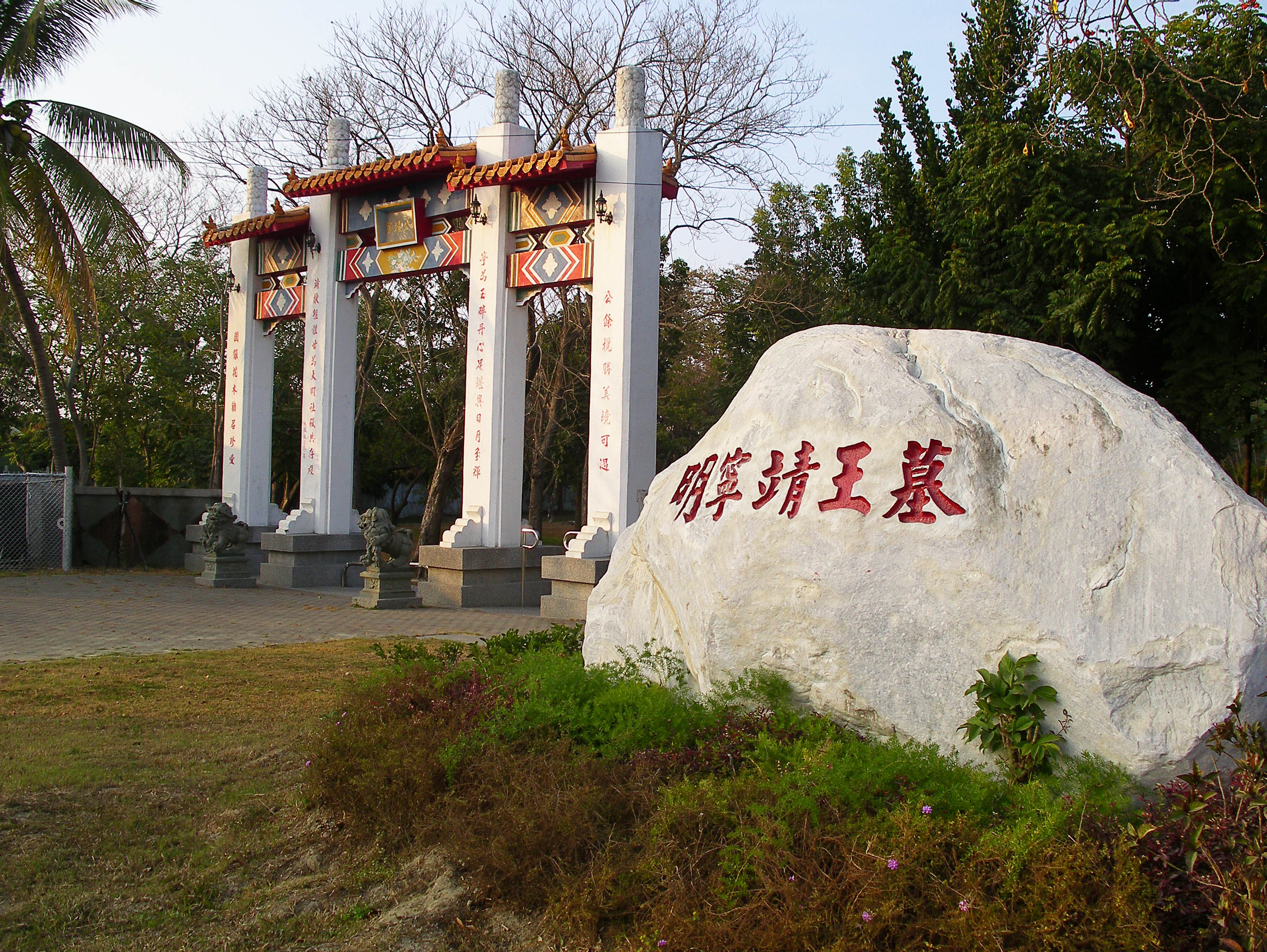

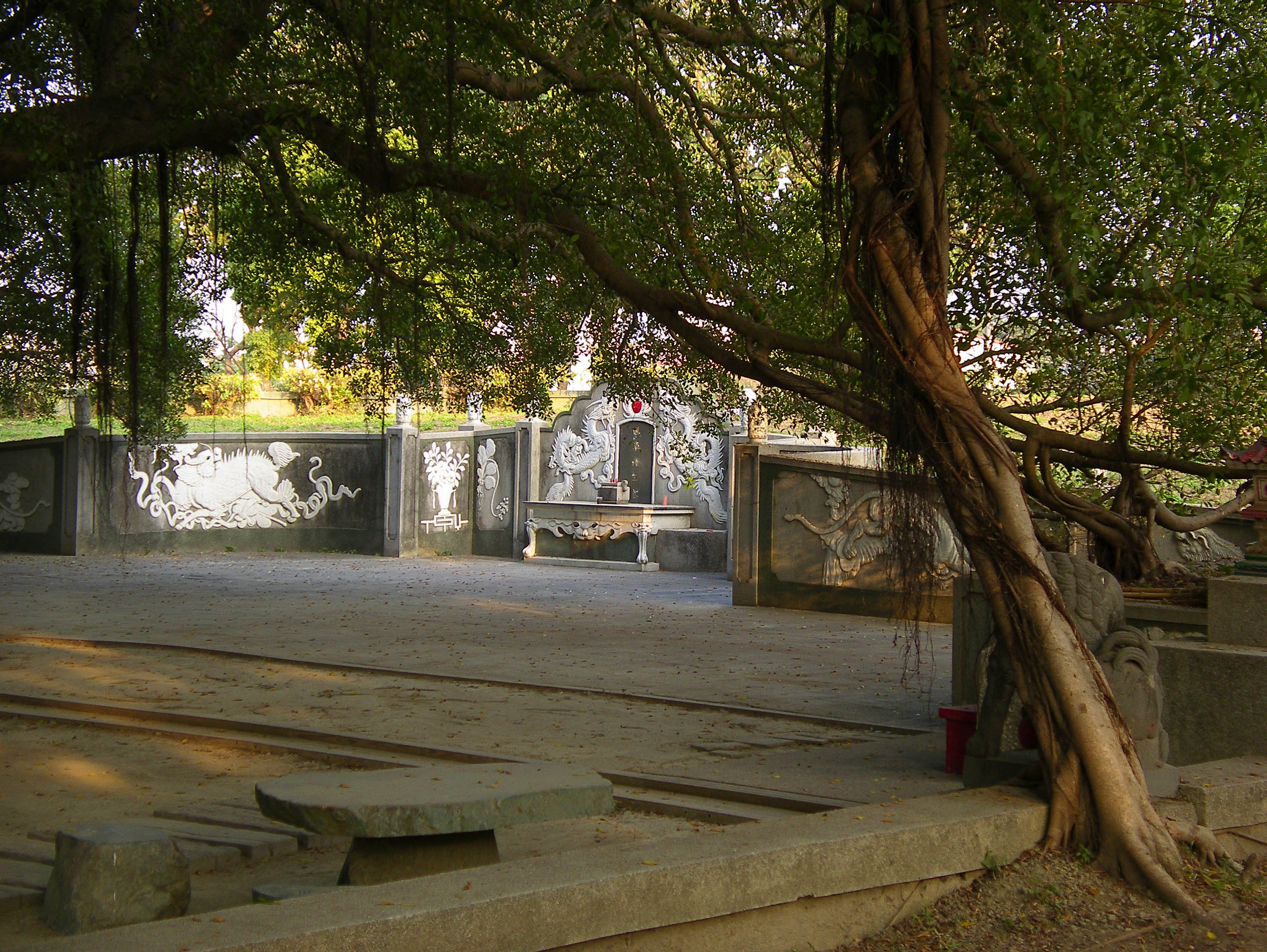

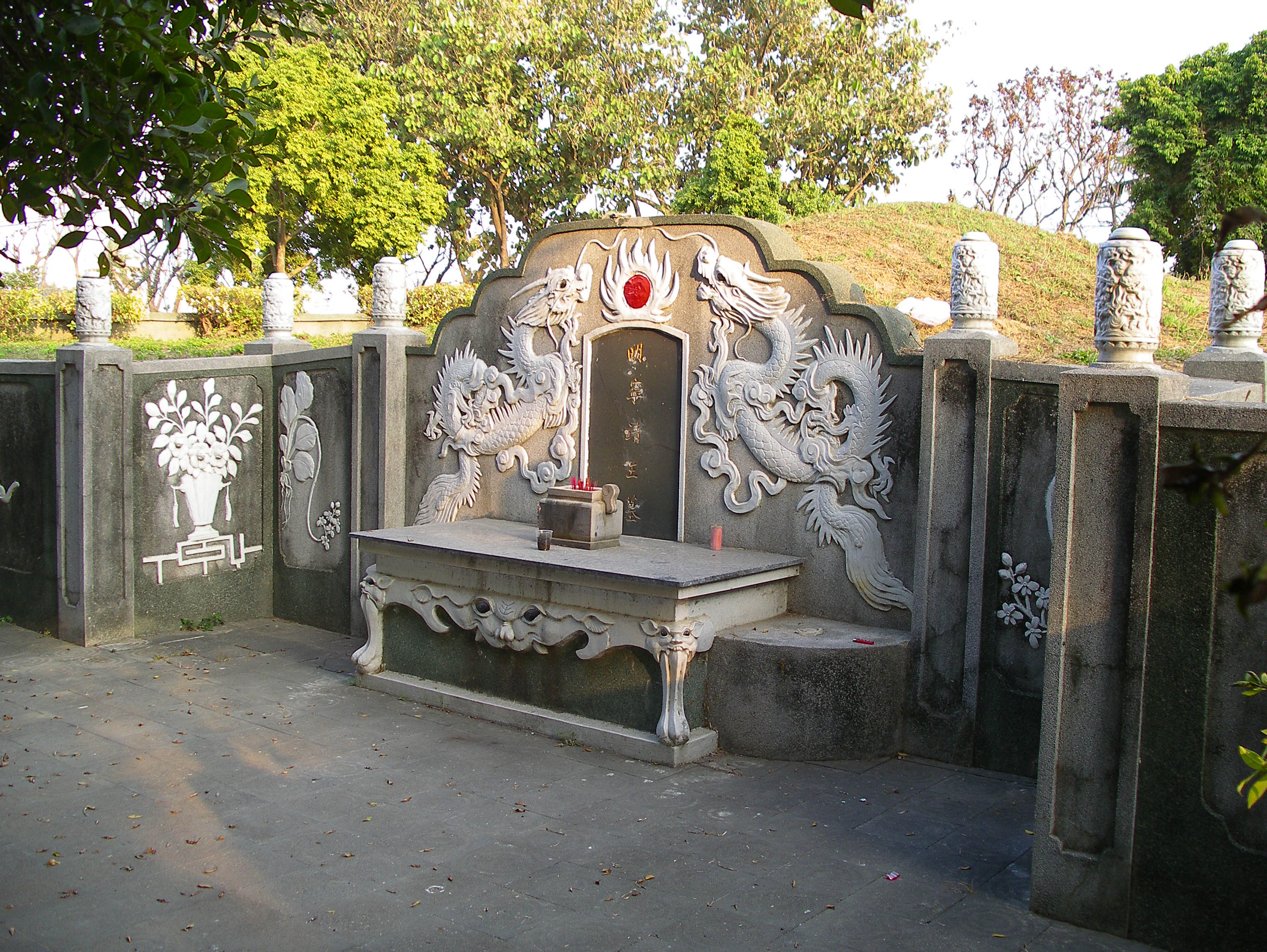

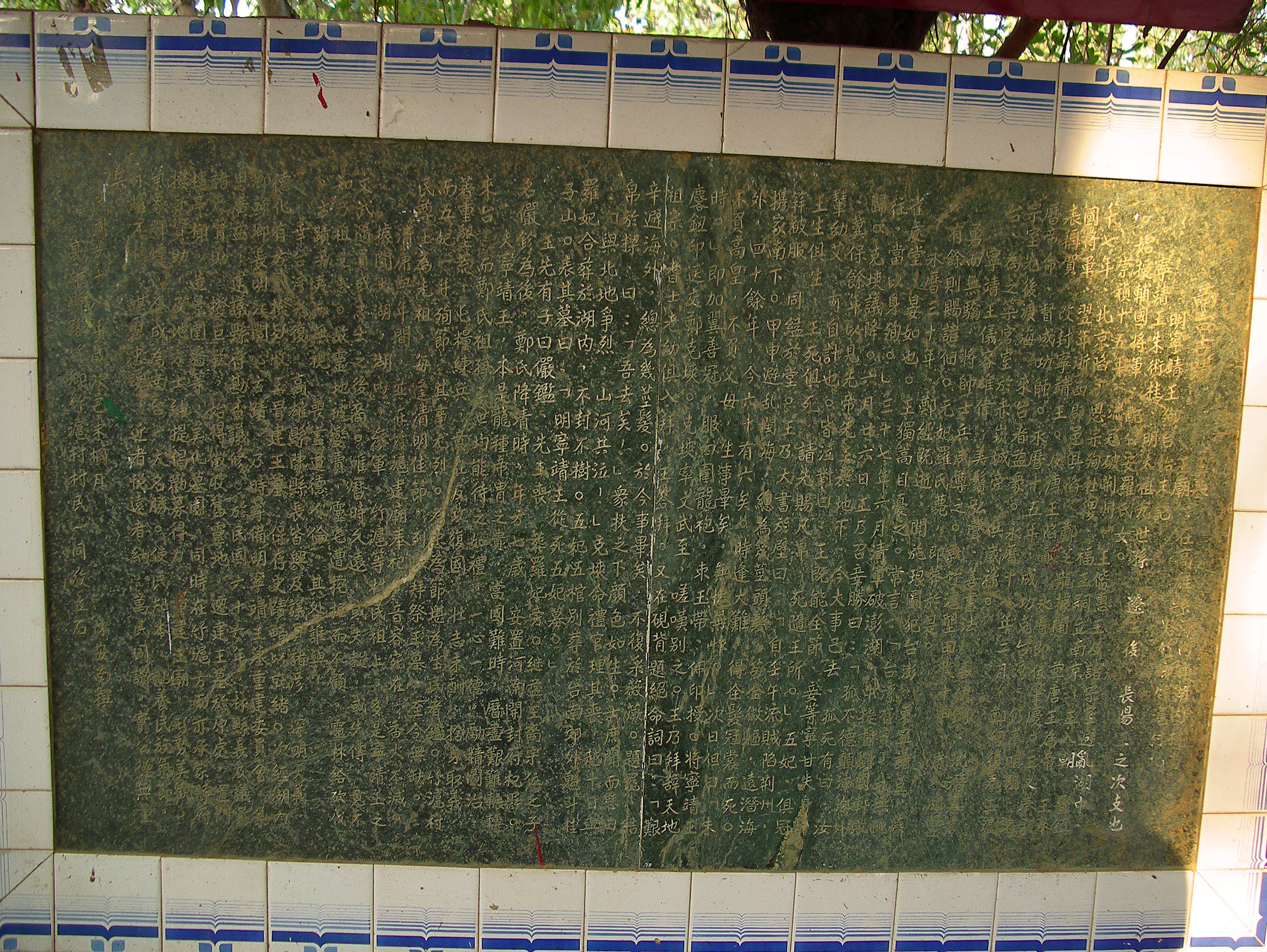

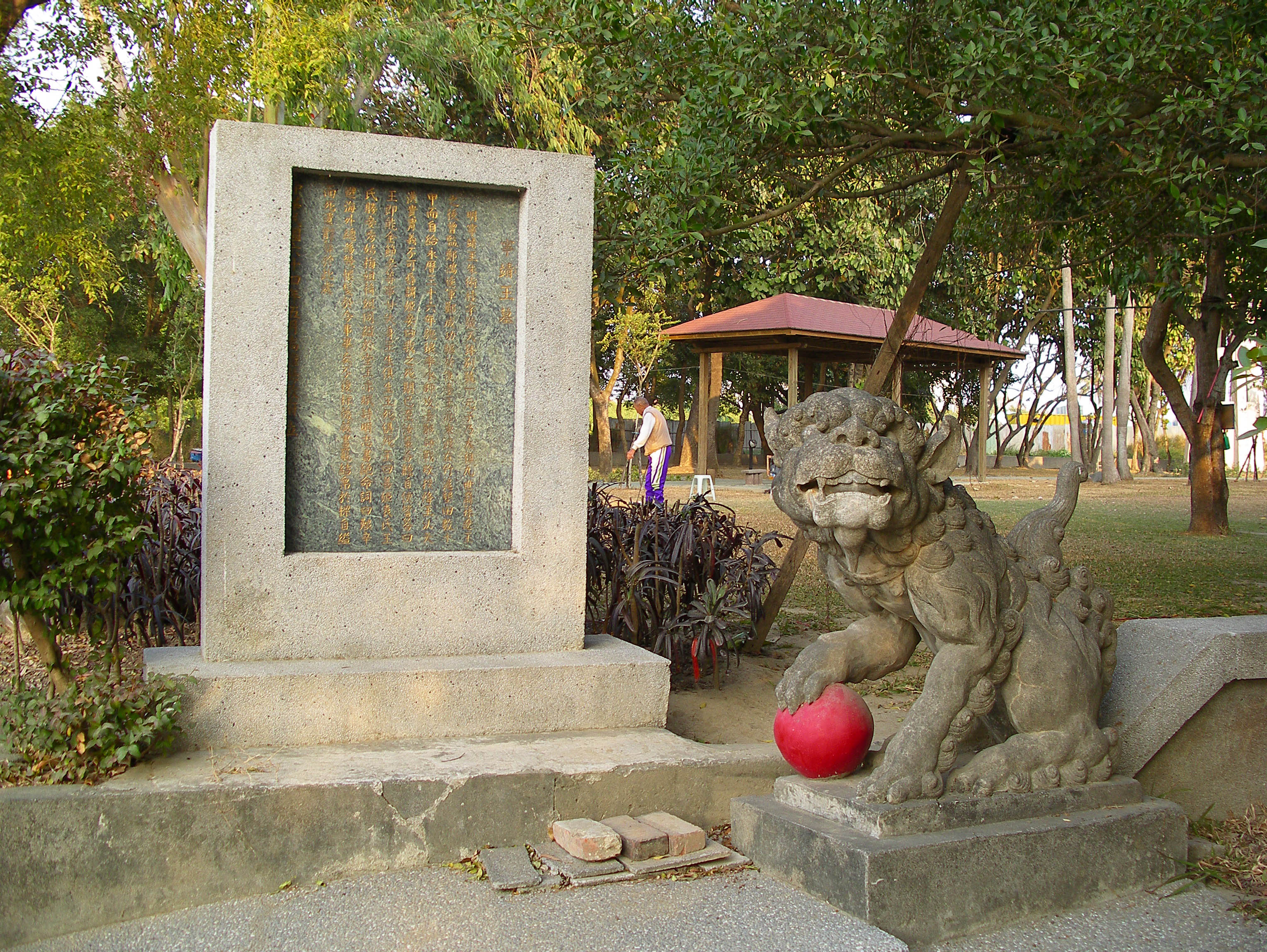

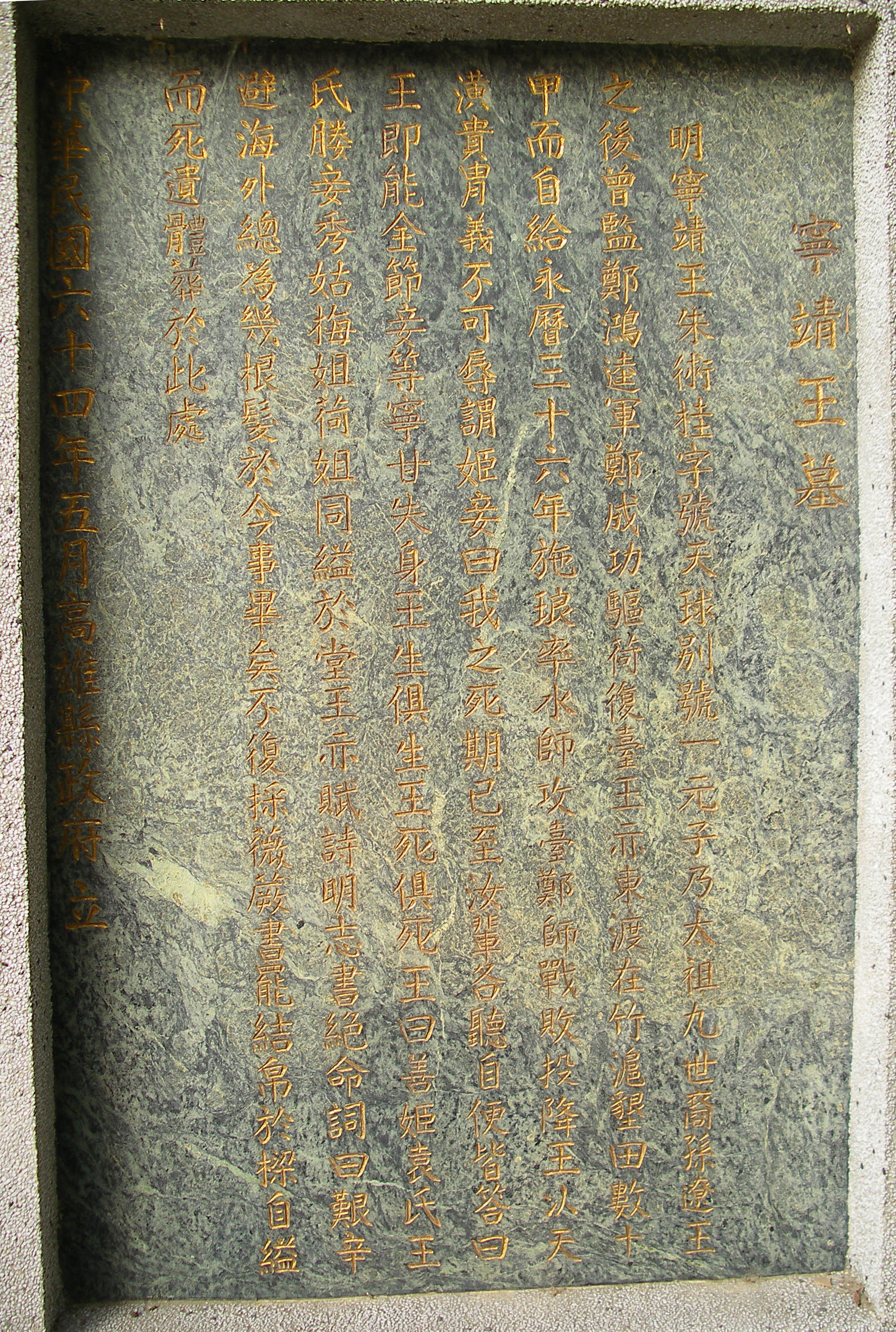

== Profile ==
He was a ninth-generation descendant of Zhu Yuanzhang (the Hongwu Emperor), the founder of the Ming dynasty, via the line of Zhu Yuanzhang's 15th son, Zhu Zhi, Prince of Liao. Zhu Zhi was the son of Zhu Yuanzhang and one of his Korean concubines, Consort Han (韓妃). Zhu Zhi's heirs used the generation names "Gui, Hao, En, Chong, Zhi, Yun, Reng, Qi, Bao, He, Xian, Shu, Yan, Zun, Ru, Cai, Han, Li, Long, Yu".

History records Zhu Shugui as being stately in appearance, handsomely whiskered and grand of voice, an outstanding calligrapher, fond of wearing a sword, a man of great actions but few words, brave but not arrogant, and respected by generals and foot-soldiers alike. Before his death, Zhu burned the contract he had with tenant farmers, bequeathing all of the farmland in Lujhu Township to them. It was after this act that he calmly ended his life, hanging himself from a roof beam.

Nowadays there is a temple dedicated to the Prince in Lujhu Township. Inside the temple is written Zhu's death poem.
