= Tainan Confucian Temple =

Temple in West Central, Tainan, Taiwan

Coordinates: 22°59′25″N 120°12′15″E

Tainan Confucian Temple 臺南孔子廟
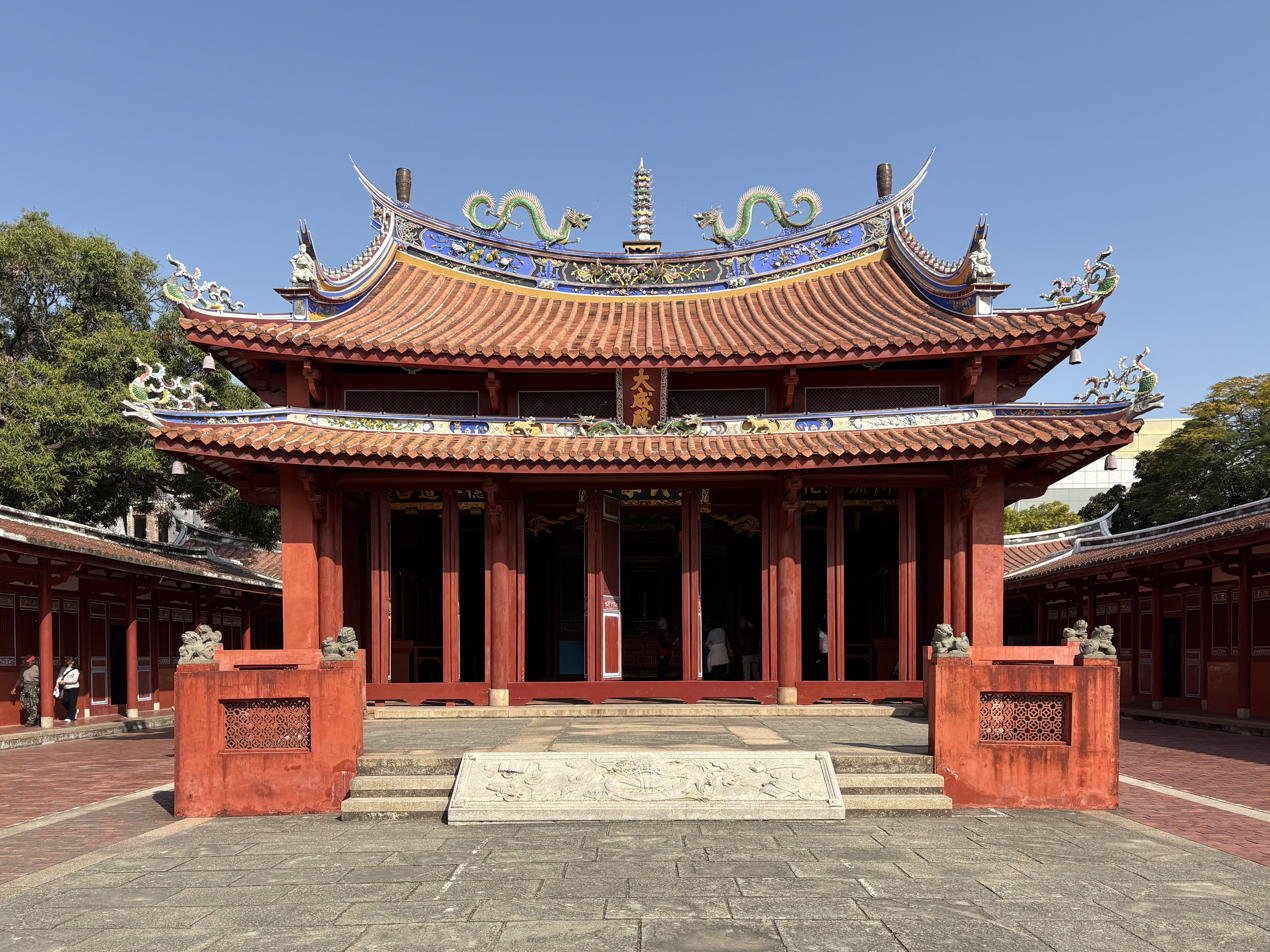
- The Ta Cheng Hall, which forms the temple's central hall

Religion
- Affiliation: Confucian
- Region: Southern Taiwan
- Status: Active

Location
- Location: West Central, Tainan, Taiwan
- Interactive map of Tainan Confucian Temple 臺南孔子廟

Architecture
- Type: Temple
- Style: Southern Chinese
- Completed: 1665
- Direction of façade: South

Website
- http://confucius.culture.tw/

The Tainan Confucian Temple (traditional Chinese: 臺南孔子廟; simplified Chinese: 台南孔子庙; pinyin: Táinán Kǒngzǐ Miào) or Quan Tai Shou Xue (Chinese: 全臺首學, lit. "First Academy of Taiwan"), is a Confucian temple on Nanmen Road (南門路) in West Central District, Tainan, Taiwan.

== History ==
=== Kingdom of Tungning ===
The temple was built in 1665 during the Koxinga dynasty, when Zheng Jing (Koxinga's son) approved of the proposal by Chief of General Staff Chen Yonghua to construct the temple on the right side and the National Academy (to be called "Guo Xue" hereafter) on the left side of a hill, with both facing the south. On the east (left) side stood Ming-Lun Hall (明倫堂; Hall of Ethics), built as a place for instructors to offer lectures and cultivate intellectuals. On the west (right) side was the sanctuary called Ta-Cheng Hall (大成殿; Hall of Great Achievement), housing the mortuary tablet of Confucius, as well as those of his distinguished disciples. The Wen Miao (文廟) and Guo Xue compound, the first of its kind in the history of Taiwan, was thus called the First Academy of Taiwan.

=== Qing Dynasty ===
In 1685, soon after the island of Formosa was annexed by the Qing dynasty, the first Taiwan Regional Chief Administrator Chou Chang (周昌) and Taiwan Prefecture Magistrate Chiang Yu-ying (蔣毓英) began their efforts to have the Wen Miao renovated and the Ta-Cheng Hall reconstructed into Taiwan Prefecture Academy. Since then, the compound has been renovated and expanded several times. In 1712, following a major renovation by Taiwan Chief Administrator Chen Ping (陳璸), the compound retained its original layout of Wen Miao to the right and Guo Xue to the left. In the Wen Miao, in addition to its Ta-Cheng Hall, a gate named Ta-Cheng Gate (Gate of Great Achievement) was erected at its front yard and a shrine named Chung-Sheng Shrine (Shrine of Confucius' Ancestors) was built in its backyard. The Ta-Cheng Hall was flanked by East-Wu and West-Wu, two chambers in the worship of ancient scholars, while the Ta-Chen Gate stood between Wen-Chang Shrine (Shrine of Scholars) to the left and Tu-Di Shrine (Shrine of the Land) to the right. Also built on both sides of the yard of the Ta-Cheng gate were two walls with the addition of Li Gate (Gate of Rites) and Yi Road (Path of Righteousness). In the academy, a gate named Ju-Te-Chih-Men (Gate of Involving in Virtue) was erected as a main entrance to the Ming-Lun Hall, the main hall of Taiwan Prefecture Academy. Situated between the gate and the hall was a courtyard flanked by Chambers of the Six Arts, while seated behind the hall were residential chambers for faculty. To the east of the Ming-Lun Hall was the Chu Tzu Altar in worship of the scholar Chu Hsi. At this point, the construction of the Wen Miao had developed approximately into its current shape and scale. The Wen Miao continued to undergo several renovations in the wake of major renovation by Chen Ping. In 1777, Taiwan Prefecture Magistrate Chiang Yuan-shu (蔣元樞) undertook a major renovation. When Taiwan was established as a province in 1887, Taiwan-fu (modern-day Tainan) became the seat of the newly created Tainan Prefecture, and was renamed Tainan-fu. Thus, the Wen Miao was renamed Tainan Prefecture Academy.

=== Empire of Japan ===
After 1895, Taiwan was under Japanese rule, the Wen Miao was once again used as a public school and military barracks and was considerably damaged. A major renovation in 1917, under which some parts of the construction were torn down, resulted in the scale and structure of the Wen Miao as it is today.

=== Republic of China ===
The temple has been renovated several times over the past 300 years, most recently between 1987 and 1989. Today the temple serves as a popular tourist attraction and also preserves ancient Confucian ceremonies, which are conducted on a regular basis. The temple also includes storerooms for the ritual implements and musical instruments that are used in these ceremonies.

== Activities ==
The temple is the only institution in Taiwan that still practices the offering of three different animals, which are goat, pig and ox, to worship Confucius.

== Gallery ==
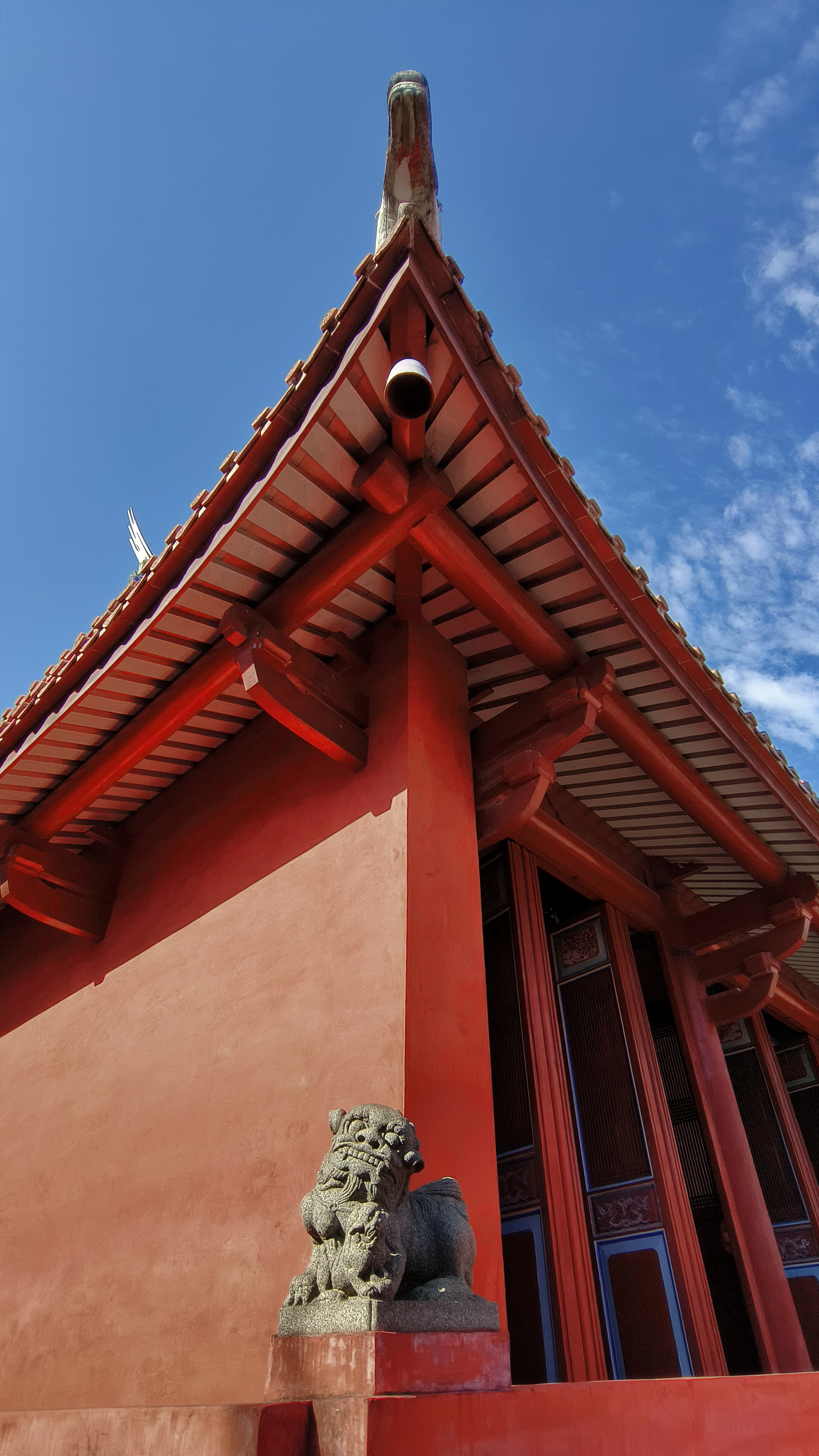
Ta Cheng Hall

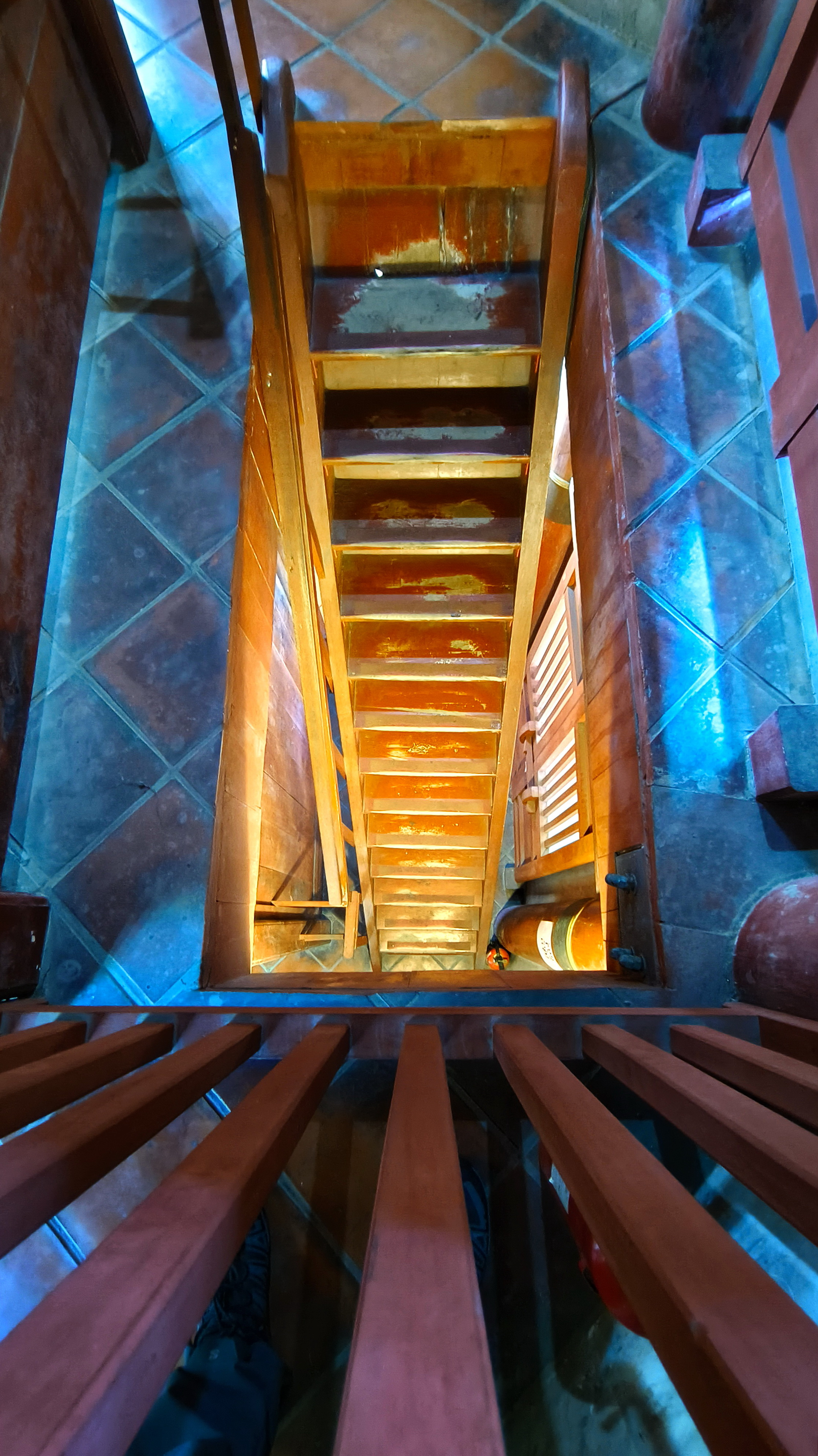
The staircase leading up to Wenchang Pavilion

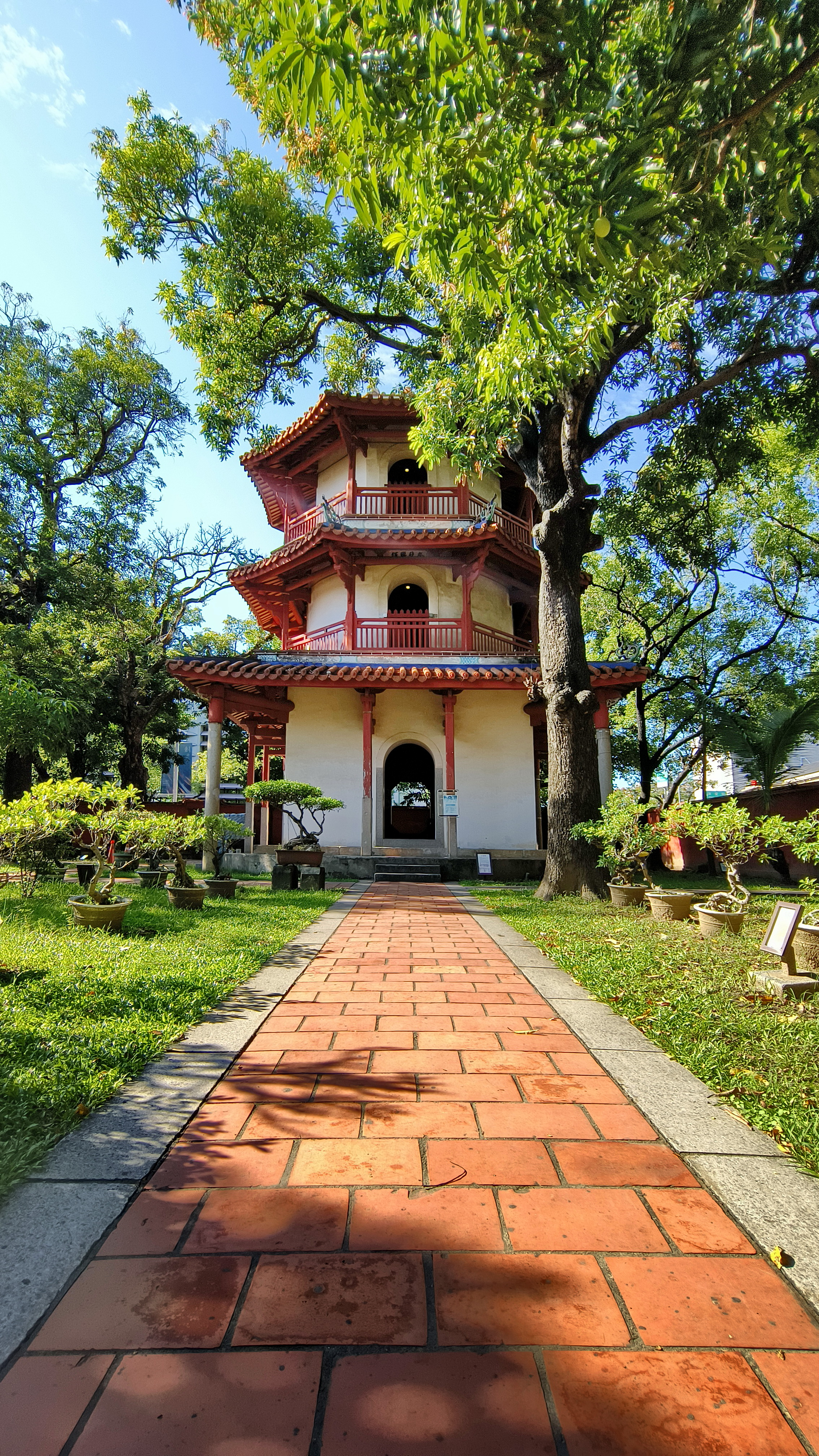
Wenchang Pavilion

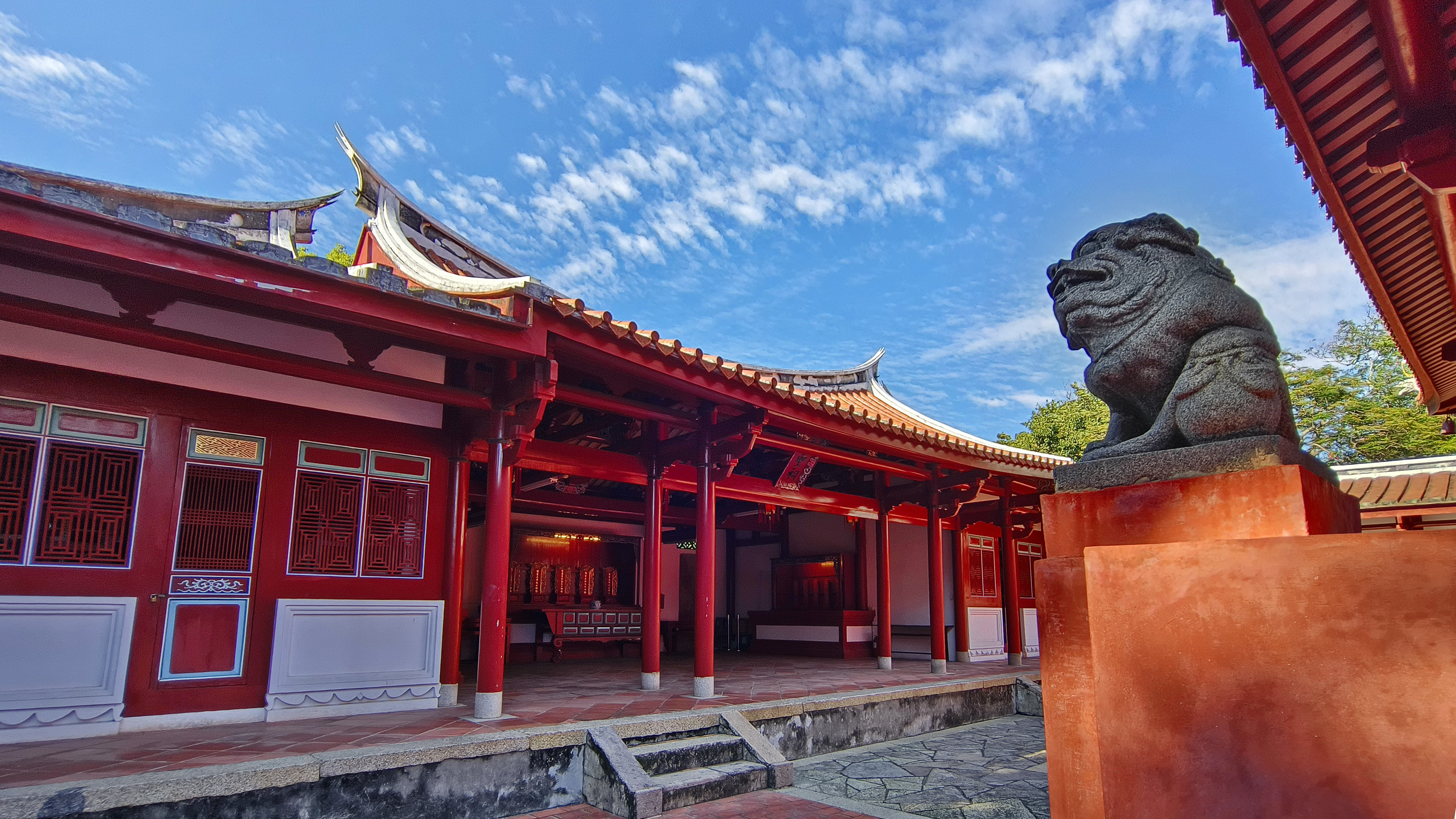
Chongsheng Shrine

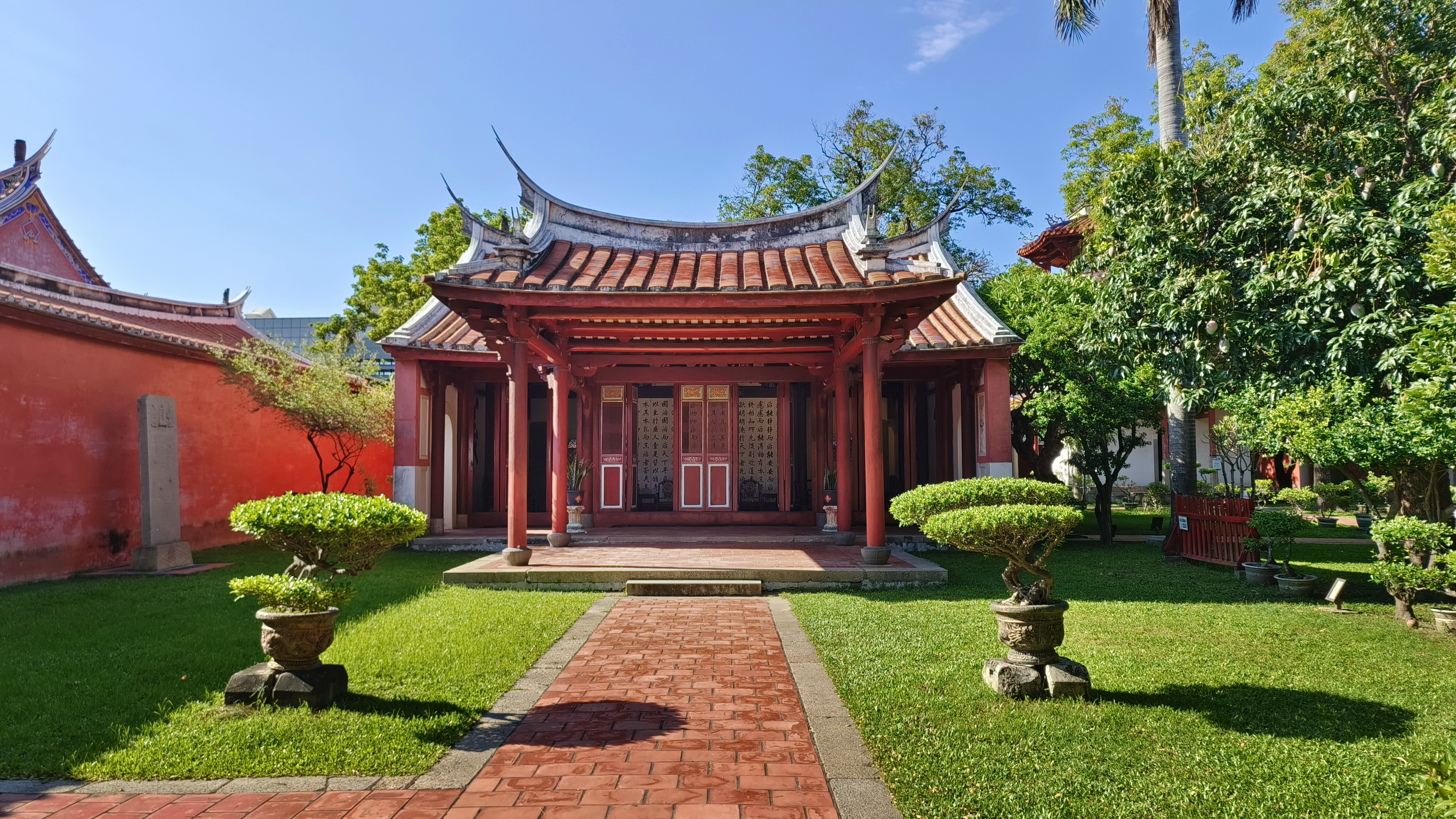
Ming-Lun Hall

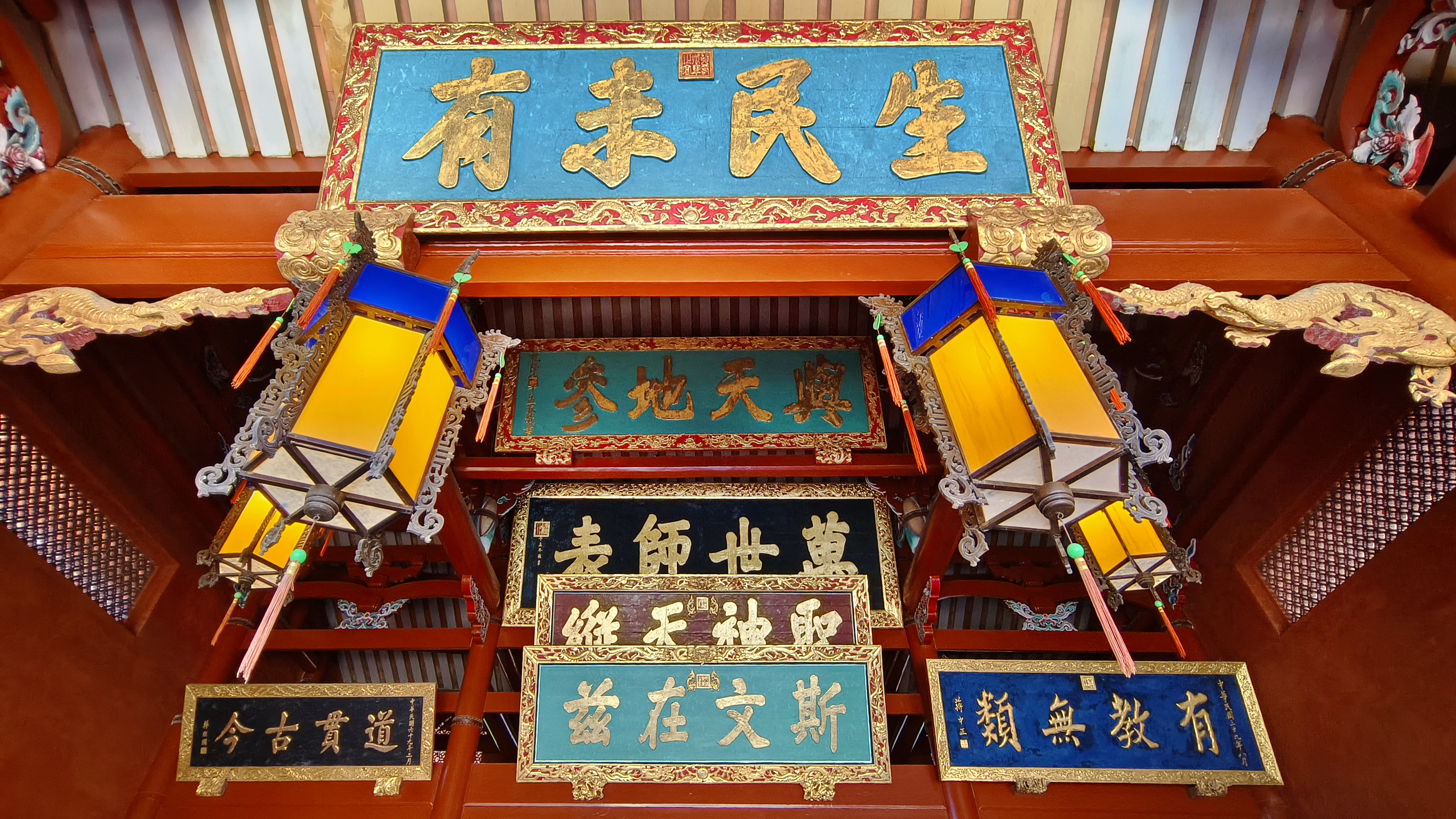
Imperial Inscribed Plaques in the Ta Cheng Hall

== See also ==
- Duke Yansheng
- Grand Matsu Temple
- Madou Daitian Temple
- State Temple of the Martial God
- Temple of the Five Concubines
- List of temples in Taiwan
