= Temple of the Five Concubines =

Taiwanese religious building

- 五妃廟
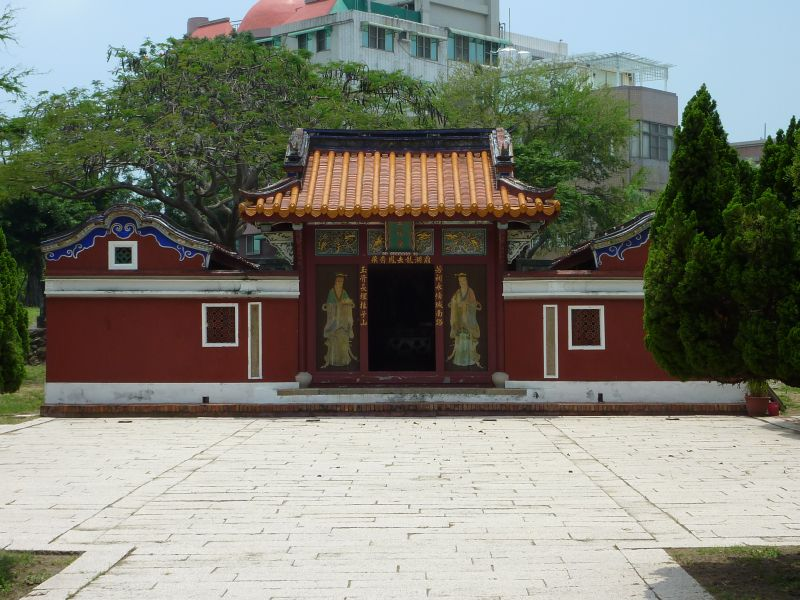

Location
- Location: West Central, Tainan, Taiwan
- Interactive map of Temple of the Five Concubines
- Coordinates: 22.982081°N 120.205214°E

The Temple of the Five Concubines (Chinese: 五妃廟; pinyin: Wǔ Fēi Miào), known also by alternative names including the Temple of the Five Noble Ladies, is a temple in West Central District, Tainan, Taiwan. It was built in front of the tomb of the five concubines of Zhu Shugui, the Ming Prince of Ningjing, who killed themselves in 1683 to accompany him in death. It is registered as a first-class historic site by the Republic of China government.

In 1683, the Qing Dynasty forces invaded Taiwan and defeated the Kingdom of Tungning, prompting Zhu Shugui to commit suicide. Rather than be left to an uncertain and inglorious fate in the hands of the Qing, the concubines elected to end their own lives as well. The names of the five concubines were Lady Yuan, Lady Wang, Xiugu, Sister Mei and Sister He; their full names are unknown.
