= First family of the Republic of China =

Family of the president of the Republic of China

The first family of the Republic of China is an informal reference to the immediate family of the president of the Republic of China, who is the head of state of the Republic of China. Members of the first family consist of the president, their spouse, and any of their children.

== List of first families ==
Portrait	President	In office	Members
	Chiang Kai-shek	20 May 1948－5 April 1975	Chiang Kai-shek, Soong May-ling, Chiang Ching-kuo, Chiang Wei-kuo
	Yen Chia-kan	6 April 1975－20 May 1978	Yen Chia-kan, Liu Chi-chun, 嚴雋榮, 嚴雋森, 嚴雋同, 嚴雋泰, 嚴雋建, 嚴雋華, 嚴雋菊, 嚴雋芸, 嚴雋荃
	Chiang Ching-kuo	20 May 1978－13 January 1988	Chiang Ching-kuo, Chiang Fang-liang, Chiang Hsiao-wen, Chiang Hsiao-chang, Chiang Hsiao-wu, Chiang Hsiao-yung
	Lee Teng-hui	13 January 1988－20 May 2000	Lee Teng-hui, Tseng Wen-hui, Lee Hsien-wen, Anna Lee, Annie Lee
	Chen Shui-bian	20 May 2000－20 May 2008	Chen Shui-bian, Wu Shu-chen, Chen Hsing-yu, Chen Chih-chung
	Ma Ying-jeou	20 May 2008－20 May 2016	Ma Ying-jeou, Christine Chow Ma, Leslie Ma, Kelly Ma
	Tsai Ing-wen	20 May 2016－Incumbent	Tsai Ing-wen

== Children of the president of the Republic of China ==
=== Chiang Kai-shek ===
==== with Mao Fumei ====
Child		Lifetime	Spouse	Notes	Place of birth
Chiang Ching-kuo	Chiang Ching-kuo	27 April 1910 – 13 January 1988	Chiang Fang-liang	Father of: Chiang Hsiao-wen (1935-1989); Chiang Hsiao-chang (b. 1937); Chiang Hsiao-wu (1945-1991); Chiang Hsiao-yung (1948-1996)	Fenghua, Zhejiang, Qing Dynasty
Chiang Ching-kuo	Chiang Ching-kuo	27 April 1910 – 13 January 1988	Chang Ya-juo; Mistress	Father of: Chiang Hsiao-yen (b. 1942); Winston Chang (1942-1996)	Fenghua, Zhejiang, Qing Dynasty

==== adopted ====
Child		Lifetime	Spouse	Notes	Place of birth
Chiang Wei-kuo	Chiang Wei-kuo	6 October 1916 – 22 September 1997	Shih Chin-i		Tokyo, Empire of Japan
Chiang Wei-kuo	Chiang Wei-kuo	6 October 1916 – 22 September 1997	Chiu Ru-hsüeh	Father of: Chiang Hsiao-kang (b. 1963)	Tokyo, Empire of Japan

=== Yen Chia-kan and Liu Chi-chun ===
- Five sons:

嚴雋榮, 嚴雋森, 嚴雋同, 嚴雋泰, 嚴雋建

- Four daughters:

嚴雋華, 嚴雋菊, 嚴雋芸, 嚴雋荃

=== Chiang Ching-kuo ===
==== with Chiang Fang-liang ====
Child	Lifetime	Spouse	Notes	Place of birth
Chiang Hsiao-wen	14 December 1935 – 14 April 1989	Syu Nai-Jin	Father of: Chiang Yu-mei (b. 1961)	Soviet Union
Chiang Hsiao-chang	15 February 1937 –	Yu Yang-ho	Mother of: Theodore Yu (b. 1961)	Soviet Union
Chiang Hsiao-wu	April 25, 1945 – July 1, 1991	汪長詩	Father of: 蔣友蘭 (b. 1972); Chiang Yu-sung (b. 1973)	Zhejiang
Chiang Hsiao-wu	April 25, 1945 – July 1, 1991	Tsai Hui-mei		Zhejiang
Chiang Hsiao-yung	27 October 1948 – 22 December 1996	Fang Chih-yi	Father of three sons: Demos Chiang (b.1976); Edward Chiang (b. 1978); Andrew Chiang (b. 1990)	Shanghai

==== with Chang Ya-juo ====
Child		Lifetime	Spouse	Notes	Place of birth
Chiang Hsiao-yen	Chiang Hsiao-yen	1 March 1942 –	Helen Huang	Father of: Chiang Hui-lan; Chiang Hui-yun; Chiang Wan-an (b. 1978)	Guilin, Guangxi
Winston Chang		1 March 1942 – 24 February 1996	Chao Chung-te	Father of: Chang Ching-sung; Chang Yu-chu	Guilin, Guangxi

=== Lee Teng-hui and Tseng Wen-hui ===
- One son:

Lee Hsien-wen (1950-1982)

- Two daughters:

Anna Lee, Annie Lee

=== Chen Shui-bian and Wu Shu-chen ===
Child	Lifetime	Spouse	Notes	Place of birth
Chen Hsing-yu	12 August 1976 –	Chao Chien-ming	Mother of three sons	Taipei
Chen Chih-chung	22 January 1979 –	Huang Jui-ching	Father of one daughter	Taipei

=== Ma Ying-jeou and Christine Chow Ma ===
Child	Lifetime	Spouse	Notes	Place of birth
Lesley Ma	24 November 1980 –	Allen Tsai	Mother of a son	Massachusetts, United States
Kelly Ma	18 November 1985 –			Taipei

=== William Lai and Wu Mei-ju ===
- Two sons:

Lai Ting-yu, Lai Ting-yen
