= First family =

Unofficial title for the family of a republic's head of state

First family is an unofficial title for the family of a republic's head of state. A first family usually consists of: the head of state, the first spouse and their children.

== Related terms ==
The term second family is often used to refer to the deputy head of state, usually a vice-president, or, in some countries, the family of the prime minister, in deference to a first family or royal family. The spouse is called the second lady or second gentleman.

== In popular culture ==
The use of the term "first family" to refer to the family of the President of the United States only came into widespread use during the Kennedy administration with the tremendous popularity of Vaughn Meader's 1962 comedy album, The First Family.

=== Comics ===
- In the comic book series Astro City, the First Family is a family of super-powered adventurers whose actual surname is "Furst."

=== Film ===
- Bob Newhart played an unpopular President of the United States in the 1980 movie First Family.

=== Literature ===
- First Family (King and Maxwell) (2010) is a novel by David Baldacci.
- The First Family: Terror, Extortion, Revenge, Murder and The Birth of the American Mafia (2010) is a nonfiction book by Mike Dash.
- First Family is the second novel in Patrick Tilley's The Amtrak Wars series.

=== Television ===
- In the Doctor Who, episode "Partners in Crime", the First Family commissioned Miss Foster to create the Adipose.
- The First Family is an American sitcom that began airing in first-run syndication in the United States beginning in 2012.
- The First Family has been the name of a few different professional wrestling stables.

== In fossils ==
The First Family is also a collection of Australopithecus afarensis fossils discovered at site "333" at Hadar in Ethiopia, near the location of another famous A. afarensis, Lucy. A. afarensis is believed to be the first habitual bipedal hominid and a direct ancestor of Homo sapiens. This species lived between 3.9 million to 2.9 million years ago.

== See also ==
- First family of the Republic of China
- First family of the United States
- Royal family in monarchies
