= Madou District =

District in Tainan, Taiwan

Madou 麻豆區 Matou, Matō
- District
- Madou District
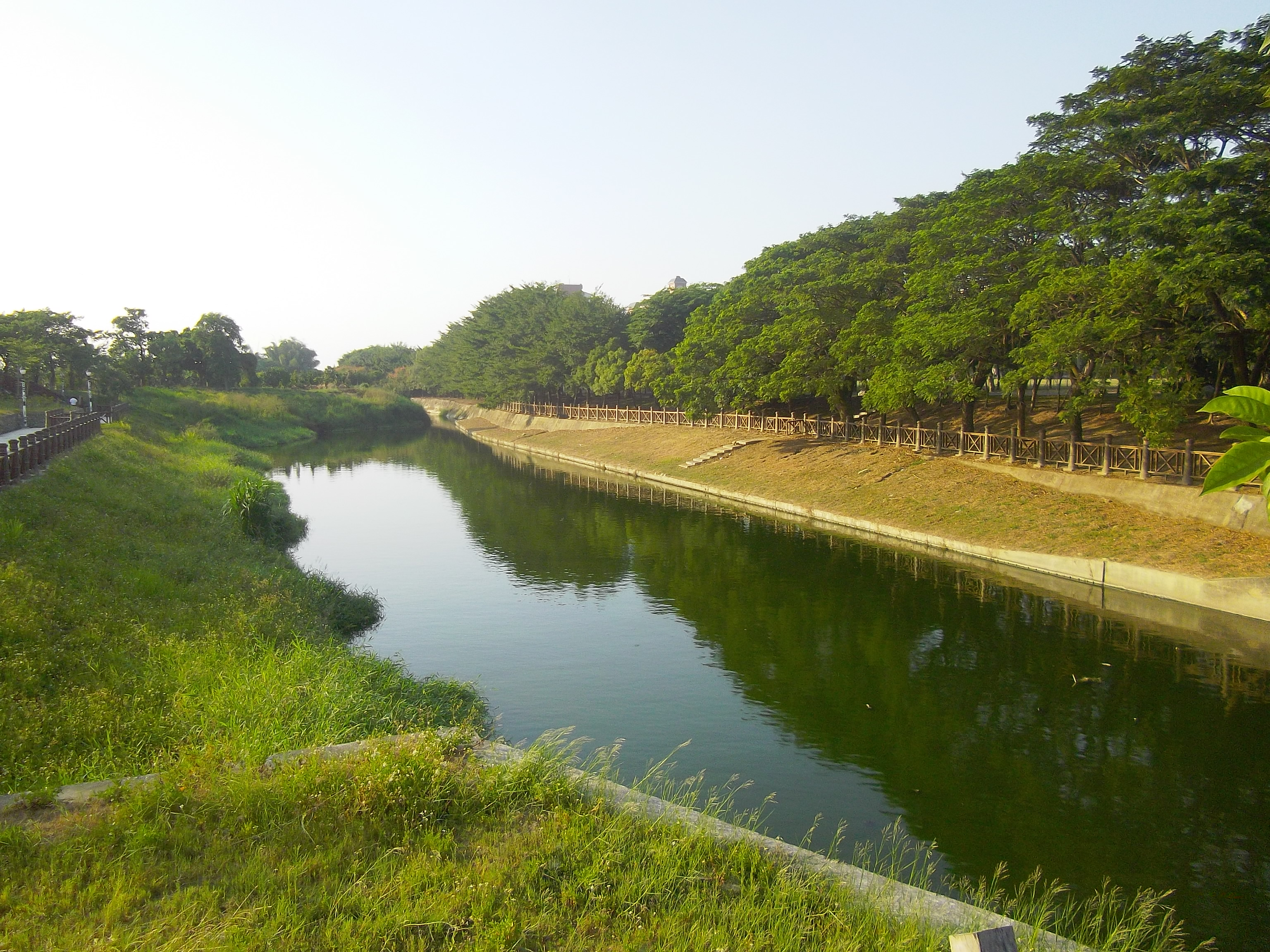
- Waterway of the ancient harbor in Madou

- Madou District in Tainan City

- Location within Taiwan
- Coordinates: 23°11′0″N 120°14′54″E
- Location: Tainan, Taiwan

Area
  - Total: 54 km^{2} (21 sq mi)

Population (May 2022)
  - Total: 43,071
  - Density: 800/km^{2} (2,100/sq mi)
- Website: madou.tainan.gov.tw (in Chinese)

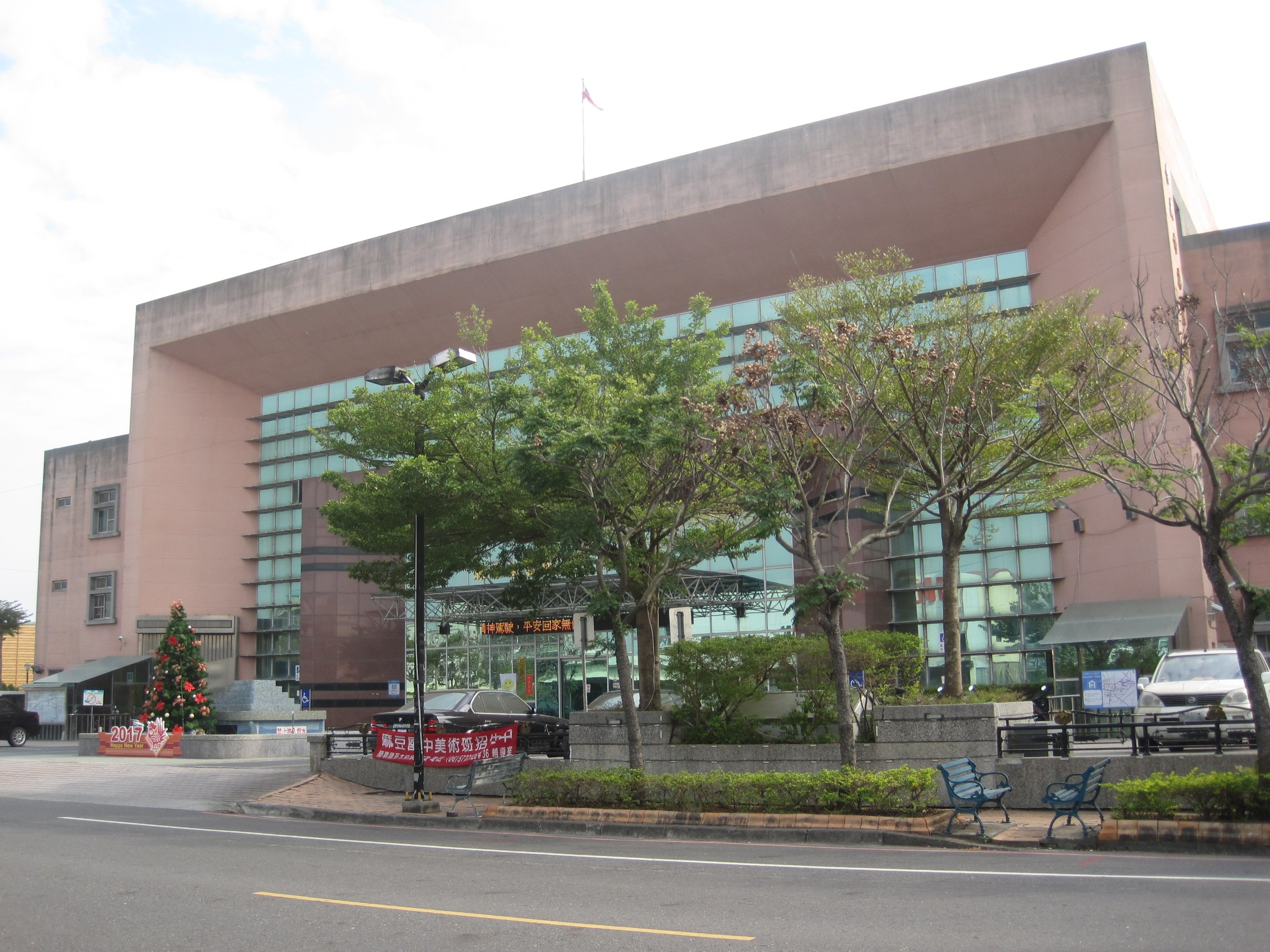
Madou District Office

Madou District (Chinese: 麻豆區; pinyin: Mádòu Qū; Pe̍h-ōe-jī: Môa-tāu-khu) is a district of about 43,071 residents in Tainan special municipality, Taiwan. It owes its name to the Siraya language word Mattau. Mattau was one of the four core Sirayan villages during much of Taiwan's colonial history and figured heavily in the formation of colonial policy in Dutch Formosa. Currently, it is a well-known town in Tainan for its local culinary specialties and historical sites, and has become more prosperous in recent five years due to the presence of two universities. As an example of the increased attention Madou is receiving, the New Year Countdown Night for 2006 in Tainan was held at Madou Junior High School.

== History ==
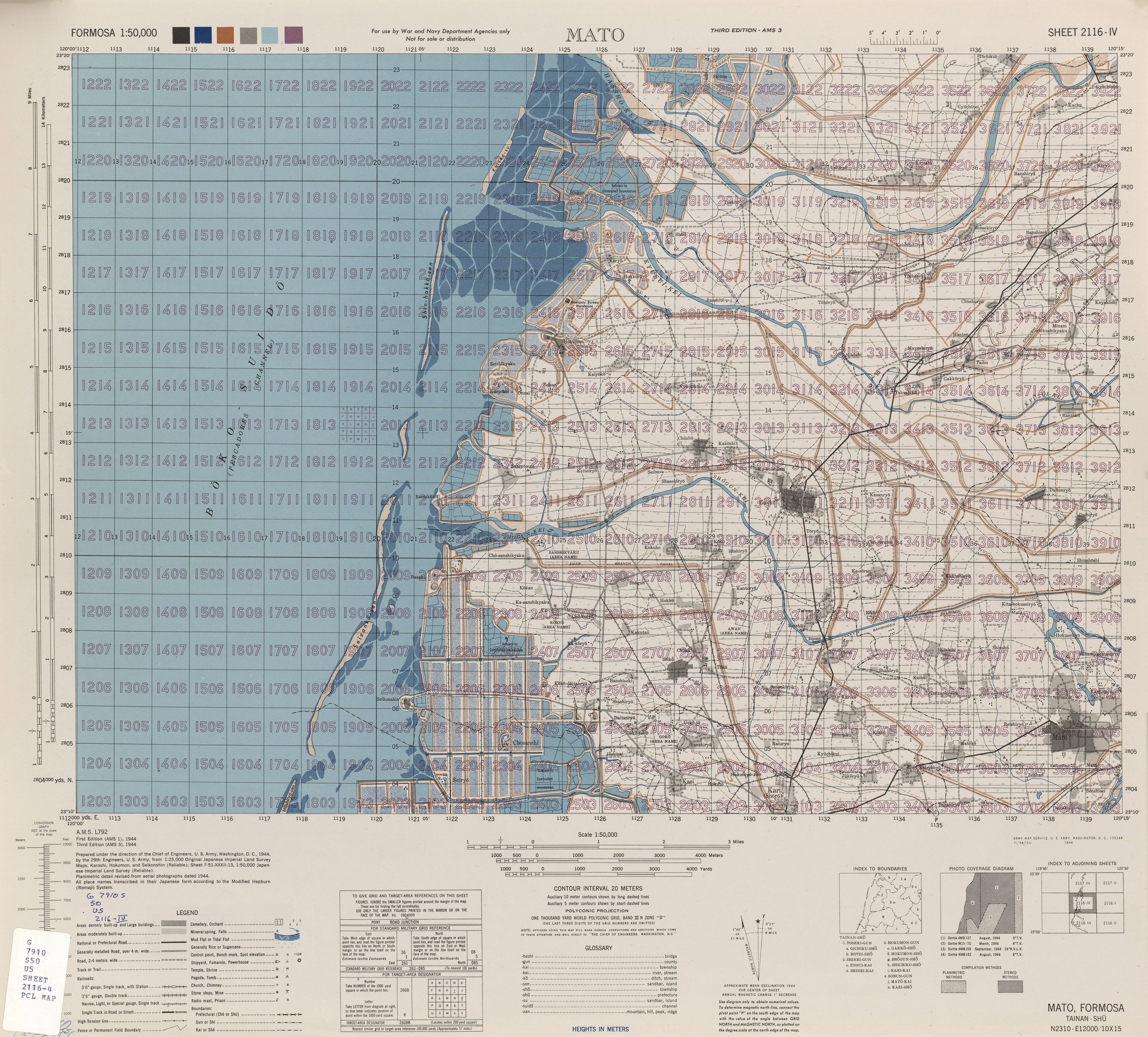
Map of Madou (labeled as Matō) and surrounding region (1944)

In the 17th century, Mattau was a village of about two to three thousand; the name was also spelled variously Matau, Mataw, Mattouw, Mathau, Matthau, Mattauw and Mandauw. Mattau was the largest and most powerful of four main aboriginal villages near Taoyuan, and had been the most troublesome for the Dutch, "massacring soldiers, destroying buildings, and uprooting crops". Located about 25 km northeast of the former Dutch base of Fort Zeelandia, the place later grew into a market-town called Moa-tau.

=== Republic of China ===
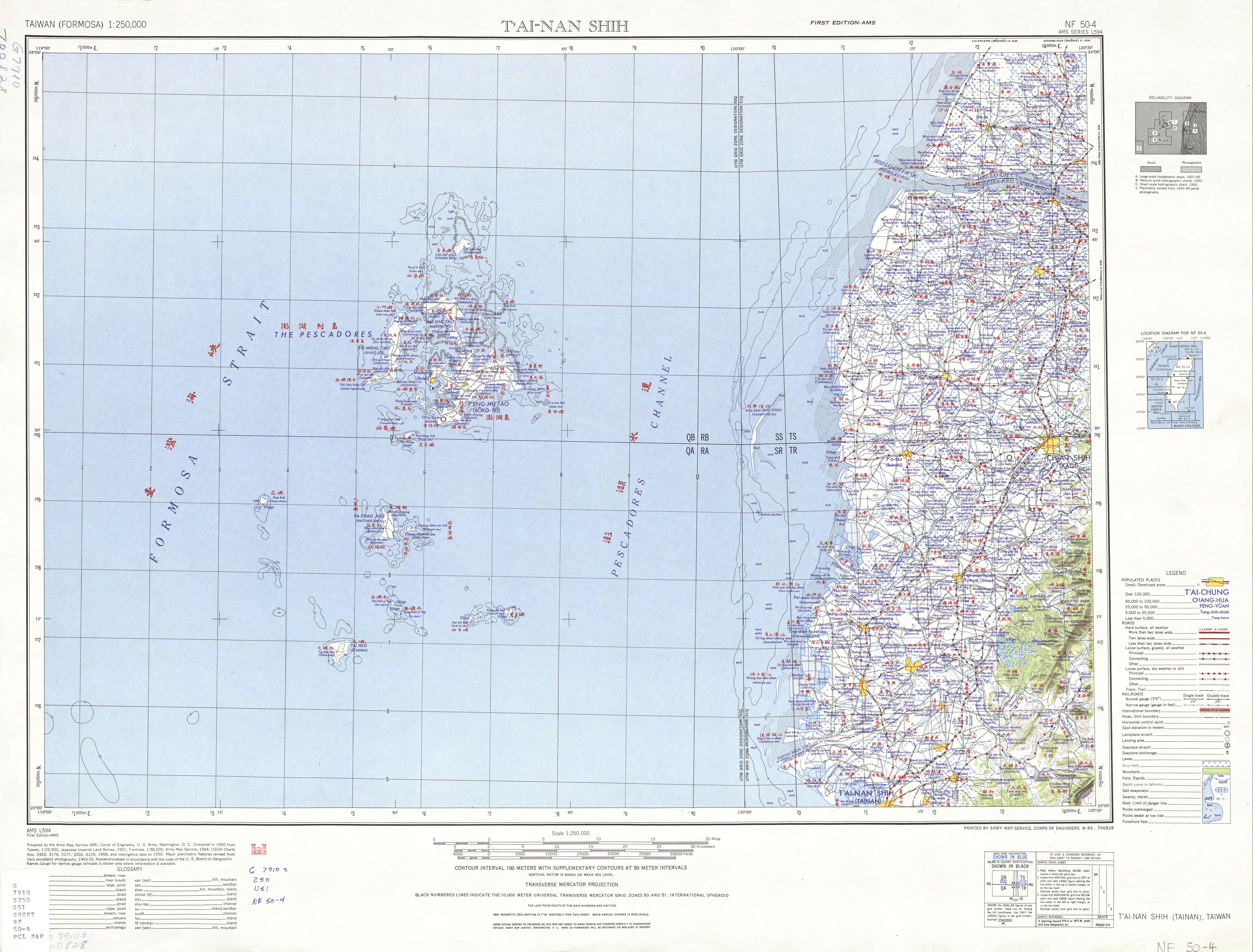
Map of Madou (labeled as Matou (Matō) 麻豆) and surrounding region (1950)

After the handover of Taiwan from Japan to the Republic of China in 1945, Madou was organized as an urban township of Tainan County. On 25 December 2010, Tainan County was merged with Tainan City and Madou was upgraded to a district of the city.

== Administrative divisions ==
Guxing, Baoan, Tungjiao, Jinjiang, Xiangkou, Zhongxing, Xingnong, Xinjian, Youju, Beishi, Dacheng, Zongrong, Longquan, Nanshi, Liaobu, Xiaobei, Beitou, Dashan, Haipu, Zhuangli, Gangwei, Makou, Antung, Anye, Anxi, Xiean, Zhongmin, Anzheng and Zhuanjing Villages.

== Education ==
- Aletheia University
- Taiwan Shoufu University

== Tourist attractions ==
- Madou Daitian Temple
- Tsung-Yeh Arts and Cultural Center
- Madou Old Harbor Park
- Madou Wenheng Temple

== Specialty ==
Shaddock (Citrus maxima) is one of the specialty foods of Madou. Being harvested around the time of mid-autumn, it is associated with the Mid-Autumn Festival. The Madou Farmer's Association holds a beauty contest named for the shaddock every year.

== Notable natives ==
- Wu Shu-chen, First lady (2000–2008)
