= First Lady of the Republic of China =

- 中華民國第一配偶

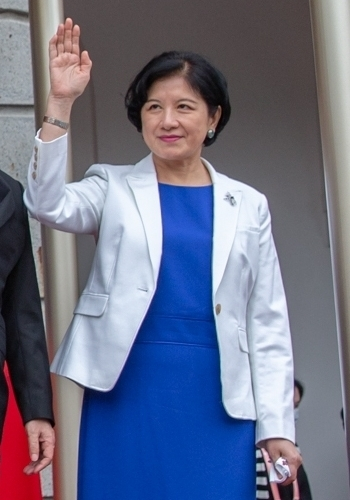
- Incumbent; Wu Mei-ju since 20 May 2024
- Inaugural holder: Lu Muzhen (1912); Soong Mei-ling (1949)
- Formation: 1 January 1912

The first lady of the Republic of China (Chinese: 中華民國第一配偶; pinyin: Zhōnghuá mínguó dì yī pèi'ǒu) is the wife of the president of the Republic of China. Since 1949, the position has been based in Taiwan, where they are often called by the title of first lady of Taiwan, in addition to first lady of the Republic of China (ROC).

The position was vacant from 2016 to 2024, as President Tsai Ing-wen, the first woman to be elected to the presidency, is unmarried.

== First Ladies (before the 1947 Constitution) ==
Spouse		Image	President	Took office	Left office
1	Lu Muzhen (1867–1952)		Sun Yat-sen	1 January 1912	10 March 1912
2	Yu Yishang (1872–1956)		Yuan Shikai	10 March 1912	6 June 1916
3	Oei Hui-lan (1889–1992)		V. K. Wellington Koo	1 October 1926	16 June 1927
4	Soong Mei-ling (1898–2003)		Chiang Kai-shek	1 August 1943	20 May 1948

== First Ladies (after the 1947 Constitution; based in Taiwan after 1949) ==
Since 1949, individuals in this position have been known as the First Lady of Taiwan, in addition to the First Lady of the Republic of China.

No.	Spouse	Image	Tenure	President	Notes
4	Soong Mei-ling 宋美齡 (5 March 1898 – 23 October 2003)		20 May 1948 – 5 April 1975	Chiang Kai-shek m. 1 December 1927	Also known as Madame Chiang Kai-shek or Madame Chiang
5	Liu Chi-chun 劉期純 (1908 – 24 December 1999)		6 April 1975 – 20 May 1978	Yen Chia-kan m. 14 December 1924	Was 1st to take office on the island.
6	Chiang Fang-liang 蔣方良 (Faina Vakhreva) (15 May 1916 – 15 December 2004)		20 May 1978 – 13 January 1988	Chiang Ching-kuo m. 15 March 1935	Born Faina Epatcheva Vahaleva in Orsha in the Russian Empire, (present-day Belarus). She met her husband Chiang Ching-kuo while both were working at the Ural Heavy Machinery Factory in Sverdlovsk, USSR (present-day Yekaterinburg). Epatcheva adopted the Chinese names Chiang Fang-liang or Faina Chiang Fang-liang. She avoided politics during her time as first lady.
7	Tseng Wen-hui 曾文惠 (born 31 March 1926)		13 January 1988 – 20 May 2000	Lee Teng-hui m. 9 February 1949	Wife of the first popularly elected president.
8	Wu Shu-chen 吳淑珍 (born 11 July 1953)		20 May 2000 – 20 May 2008	Chen Shui-bian m. 20 February 1975	Member of the Legislative Yuan from 1987 until 1990.
9	Christine Chow Ma (Chow Mei-ching) 周美青 (born 30 November 1952)		20 May 2008 – 20 May 2016	Ma Ying-jeou m. 20 August 1977	Born Chow Mei-ching (周美青) in British Hong Kong, Chow headed the legal department of Mega International Commercial Bank, where she worked as a lawyer for more than 20 years, prior to becoming first lady.
–	None		20 May 2016 – 20 May 2024	Tsai Ing-wen unmarried	President Tsai Ing-wen, the first female head of state in the Republic's history, is unmarried.
10	Wu Mei-ju 吳玫如 (born 1964)		20 May 2024 – Incumbent	Lai Ching-te m. 1986	

== Longevity ==
Rank	First Lady	Born	Died	Age
1	Soong Mei-ling	5 March 1898	23 October 2003	105 years, 232 days
2	Oei Hui-lan	2 December 1889	1992	102 years, 364 days to 103 years, 29 days
3	Tseng Wen-hui	31 Mar 1926	Alive	100 years, 228 days
4	Liu Chi-chun	1908	24 December 1999	90 years, 358 days to 91 years, 327 days
5	Chiang Fang-liang	15 May 1916	15 Dec 2004	88 years, 214 days
6	Lu Muzhen	30 July 1867	7 September 1952	85 years, 39 days
7	Yu Yishang	1872	1956	84 years, 334 days to 84 years, 365 days
8	Christine Chow Ma	30 Nov 1952	Alive	73 years, 349 days
9	Wu Shu-chen	11 Jul 1953	Alive	73 years, 126 days
10	Wu Mei-ju	1964	Alive	

== See also ==
- List of presidents of the Republic of China
- First family of the Republic of China
