= Wincon =

British science fiction convention

Wincon was a series of British science fiction conventions, initially envisaged as a one-off entry in the Unicon science fiction convention sequence (1980 onwards) but which subsequently took on a life of its own as an occasional event held at King Alfred's College, Winchester. The first was held in 1988 (a.k.a. Unicon 9), the most recent in 1999. Guests have included Patrick Tilley, Geoff Ryman, Michael de Larrabeiti, Bruce Sterling, Josef Nesvadba, Gwyneth Jones, Brian Stableford, Colin Greenland, Norman Spinrad, Patrick Hogan, Diana Wynne Jones and Warren Ellis.

Although not officially the fourth Wincon, 1997 Eastercon (held in Liverpool) was organised by most of the core group, which includes Phil Plumbly, John Richards, Peter Wright, Anne-Marie Wright, Steve Green, Andy Croft, Keith Cosslett and John Bark. Other committee members have included Mike Cheater, Joy Hibbert, Dave Rowley, Peter Cohen, Terry Hunt, and Geoff Hill.

The guests at Intervention were Brian W Aldiss, David Langford, Octavia Butler and Jon Bing. The next instalment (back in St Alfred's College) recognised this relationship by its title, "Wincon V"; it completed the circle by also being part of the Unicon cycle.

There are no current plans to revive the Wincon series, as many of the original organisers are now scattered across the UK, but it remains one of England's more significant regional science fiction conventions.

Year	Name	Location	Guests of Honour
1988	Wincon I	King Alfred's College, Winchester	Patrick Tilley, Geoff Ryman
1991	Wincon II	King Alfred's College, Winchester	Brian Stableford, Bruce Sterling, Josef Nesvadba
1994	Wincon III	King Alfred's College, Winchester	Algis Budrys, James P. Hogan, Norman Spinrad
1997	Intervention	Adelphi Hotel, Liverpool	Brian W Aldiss, David Langford, Octavia Butler, Jon Bing
1999	Wincon V	King Alfred's College, Winchester	John Whitbourn, Warren Ellis, Michael Sheard, Richard LeParmentier, Dianna Wynne Jones
