= Madou Daitian Temple =

Temple in Madou, Tainan, Taiwan

- 麻豆代天府
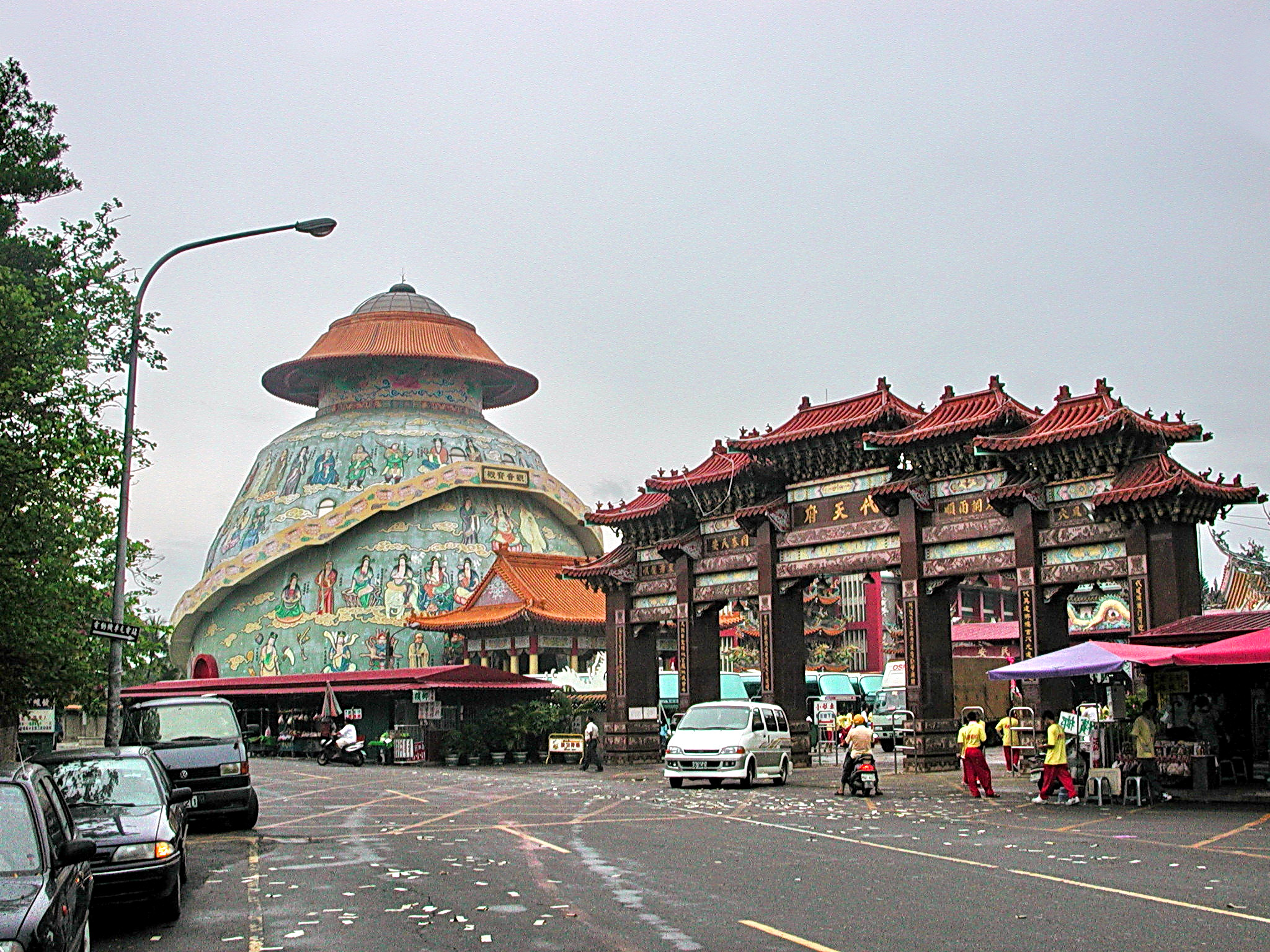

- Location within Tainan

Religion
- Affiliation: Taoism
- Ecclesiastical or organizational status: Taoist temple
- Status: Active

Location
- Location: Madou, Tainan
- Country: Taiwan
- Interactive map of Madou Daitian Temple
- Coordinates: 23°11′24.5″N 120°15′38.2″E

Architecture
- Type: temple
- Completed: 1955

The Madou Daitian Temple (Chinese: 麻豆代天府; pinyin: Mádòu Dàitiān Fǔ) or Temple of the Heavenly Viceroys is a temple in Nanshi Village, Madou District, Tainan, Taiwan.

== History ==
The temple was originally constructed in the 17th century as the Baoning Temple. After an earthquake, the temple was relocated to another place and renamed Bao'an Temple. In 1955, the temple was rebuilt and renamed Madou Daitian Temple. The construction took around 10 years to be completed.

== Architecture ==
The temple was designed with sculptures and paintings over an area of 3 hectares. The roof is covered with tiles. It is constructed with Quanzhou architectural style. In the backyard, there is a 76-meter long and 7-meter high Chinese dragon statue which was built in 1979. The dragon mouth forms a 5-meter diameter entrance to the tunnel stretched along the dragon body.

== See also ==
- Wang Ye worship
- Gushan Daitian Temple, Kaohsiung
- Beiji Temple
- Grand Matsu Temple
- Taiwan Confucian Temple
- State Temple of the Martial God
- Temple of the Five Concubines
- List of temples in Taiwan
- List of tourist attractions in Taiwan
