= Tsung-Yeh Arts and Cultural Center =

Arts and cultural center in Madou, Tainan, Taiwan

- 總爺藝文中心
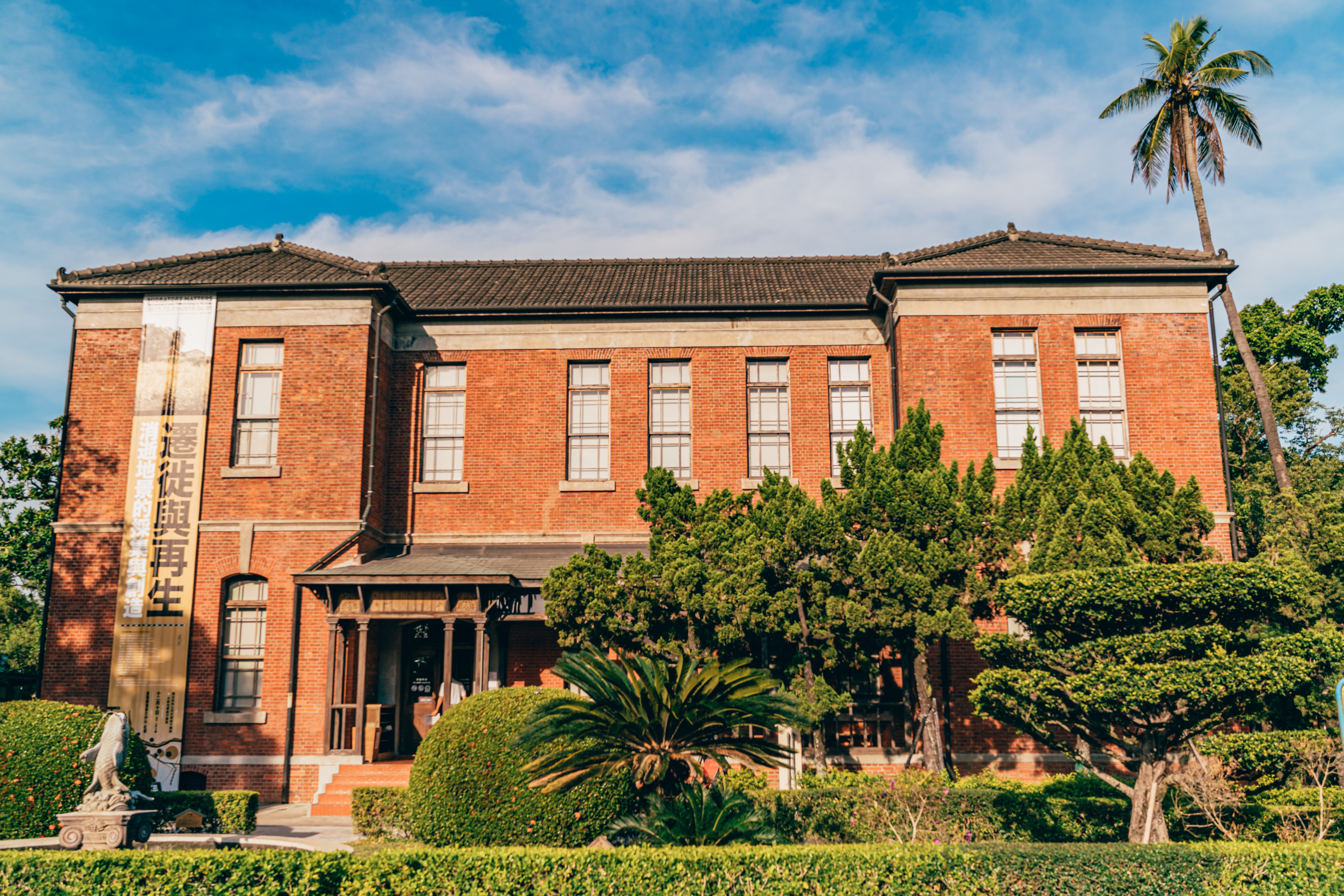
- Interactive map of the Tsung-Yeh Arts and Cultural Center area

General information
- Type: arts and cultural center
- Location: Madou, Tainan, Taiwan
- Coordinates: 23°11′08.9″N 120°16′08.3″E
- Opened: 2001

Technical details
- Floor area: 2,500 m^{2}

Website
- Official website (in Chinese)

The Tsung-Yeh Arts and Cultural Center (traditional Chinese: 總爺藝文中心; simplified Chinese: 总爷艺文中心; pinyin: Zǒngyé Yìwén Zhōngxīn) is an arts and cultural center in Madou District, Tainan, Taiwan.

== History ==
The center was opened in 2001 by transforming a former sugar refinery.

== Architecture ==
The center consists of several buildings which are used as art workshops. It also features tunnel and grass field.

== Transportation ==
The center is accessible by bus from Longtian Station of Taiwan Railway.

== See also ==
- List of tourist attractions in Taiwan
