= Grand Matsu Temple =

Mazu temple in Tainan, Taiwan

Coordinates: 22.9969°N 120.2011°E

- 大天后宫
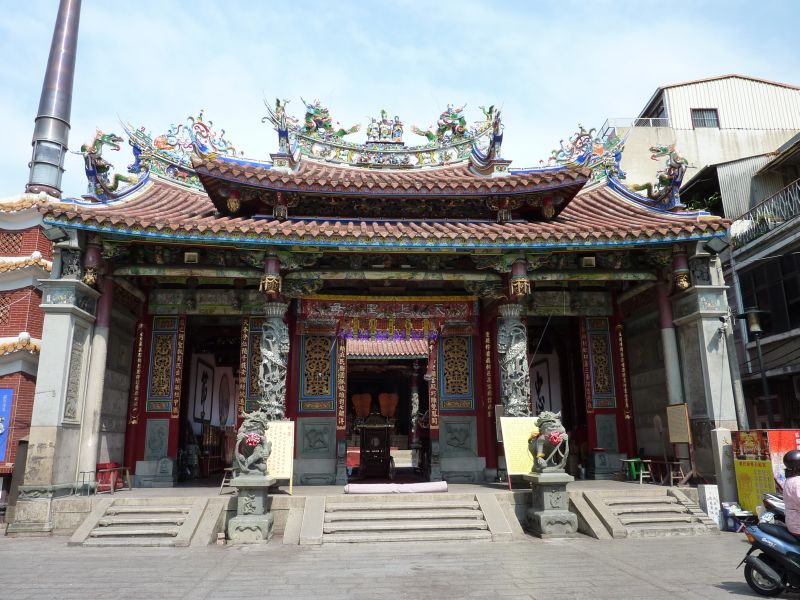

Religion
- Affiliation: Taoism
- Deity: Mazu

Location
- Location: West Central, Tainan, Taiwan
- Interactive map of Grand Matsu Temple

Architecture
- Type: Temple
- Creator: Zheng Jing
- Completed: 1664

The Grand Matsu Temple (Chinese: 大天后宫; pinyin: Dàtiān Hòugōng), also known as the Datianhou or Great Queen of Heaven Temple, is a Taiwanese temple to the goddess Mazu, who is the Goddess of Sea and Patron Deity of fishermen, sailors and any occupations related to the sea. The temple is located in West Central District, Tainan, Taiwan.

It is open seven days a week, with free admission.

== History ==
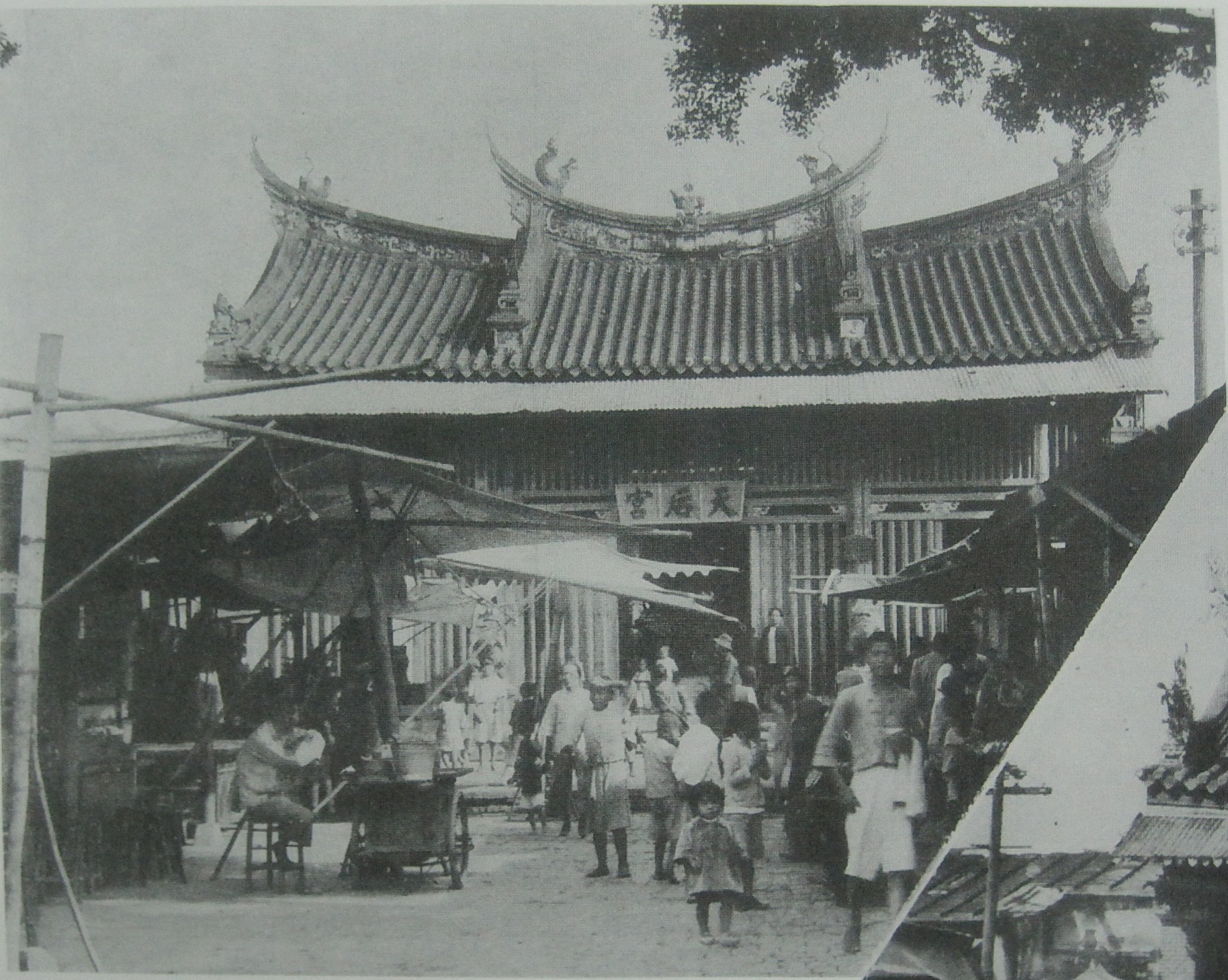
The temple in 1933

The Grand Matsu Temple was originally the palace of the Southern Ming prince Zhu Shugui, constructed for him near Chikan Tower by the Tungning king Zheng Jing in 1664.

Zhu, known as Prince Ningjing, helped Koxinga's dynasty colonize and clear farmland in the surrounding Chengtian Prefecture but, after Shi Lang's 1683 victory at Penghu, Zheng Keshuang was obliged to surrender to the Qing Empire. Zhu's five concubines then hanged themselves one by one from the beams of his palace's bedroom and the next day he joined them in suicide. His ladies continue to be honored at Tainan's Temple of the Five Concubines.

Shi Lang initially took up residence at the palace, rebuilding some areas to his liking, but then memorialized the Kangxi Emperor to convert it into a temple to Mazu, the deified form of the medieval Fujianese shamaness Lin Moniang. This was done the next year in 1684 under Mazu's newly-granted title of "Empress of Heaven". It was the first temple to be so named, giving it some precedence over her earlier temples, which honored her as a "Princess of Heaven". The move served a propaganda function, with the Qing claiming to honor Mazu's "support" for their conquest of Taiwan from Tungning.

The temple was renovated in 1765 and again in 1775, when it assumed its current appearance. A fire occasioned another rebuilding in 1818 and it fell into disrepair in the late Qing. Following the Japanese occupation of Taiwan, it was almost auctioned to private interests but this was cancelled at the last minute. It was partially rebuilt after damage from an earthquake in 1946.

The temple was declared a protected monument in 1985.

== Architecture ==
The Main Hall is dedicated to Mazu, flanked by her two guardian demons Qianliyan and Shunfeng'er. It includes a stele erected by Shi Lang in 1685. The Rear Hall is also known as the Sacred Parents Hall, as it honors Mazu's parents, along with her brother, sisters, and Prince Ningjing. It is the site of the prince's former bedroom, where his five concubines preceded him in suicide during the Qing conquest of Taiwan.

== Services ==
The altar of Yue Lao, the old man under the moon, is frequented by singles in search of a husband or wife.

== Legacy ==
The temple is the namesake of West Central District's surrounding Tienhou Community.

== Gallery ==
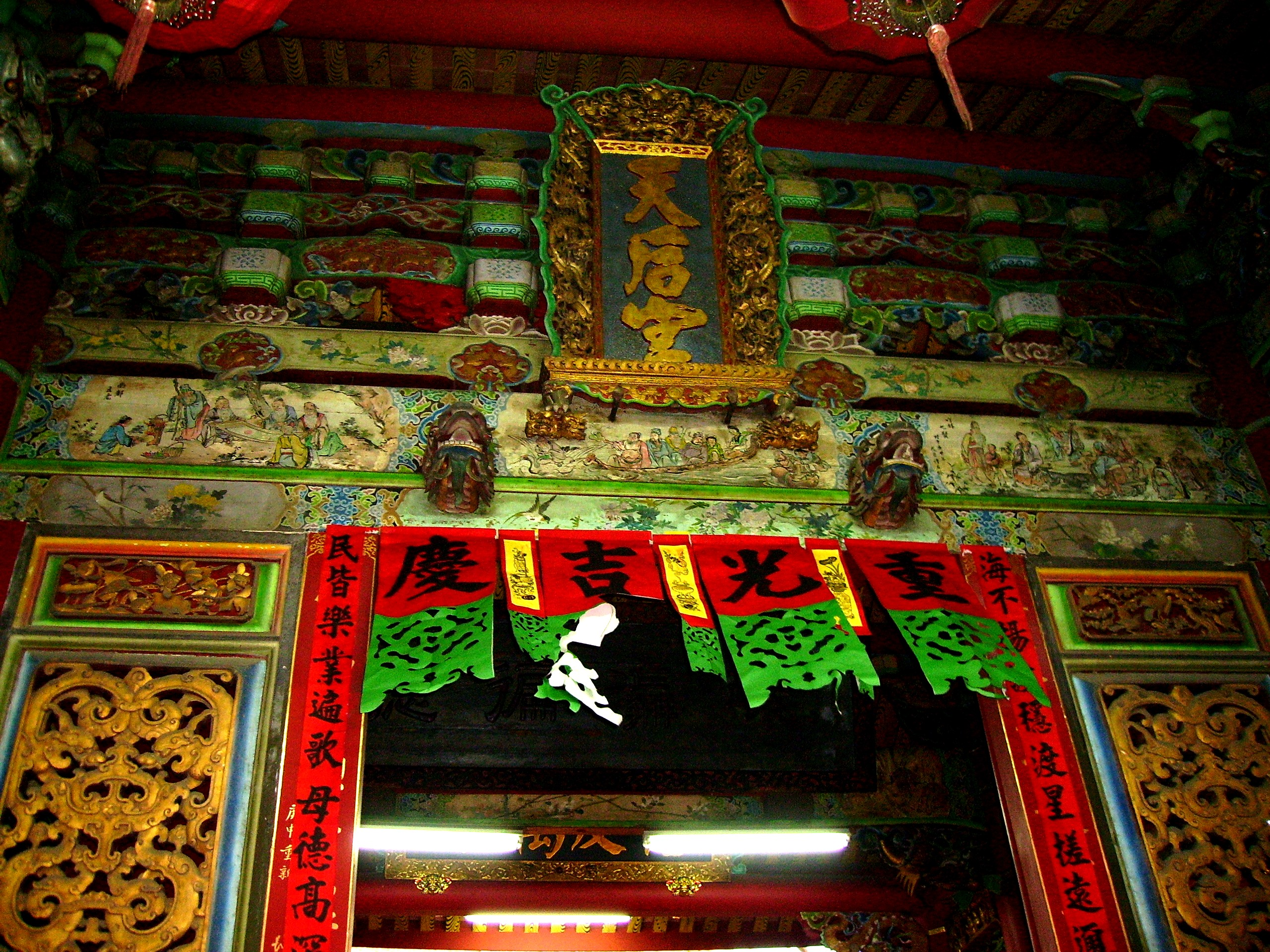
Entrance plaque

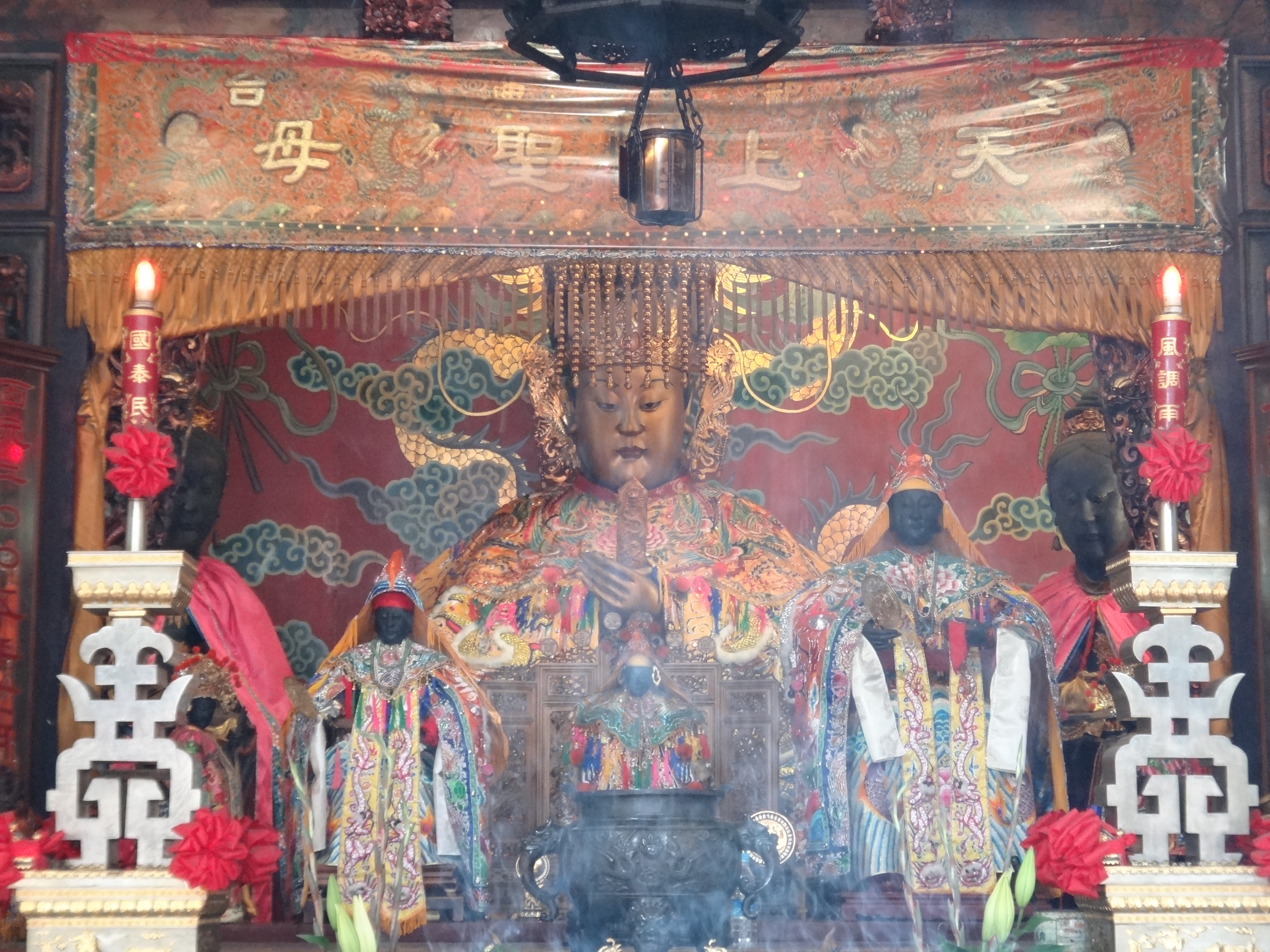
Main Shrine

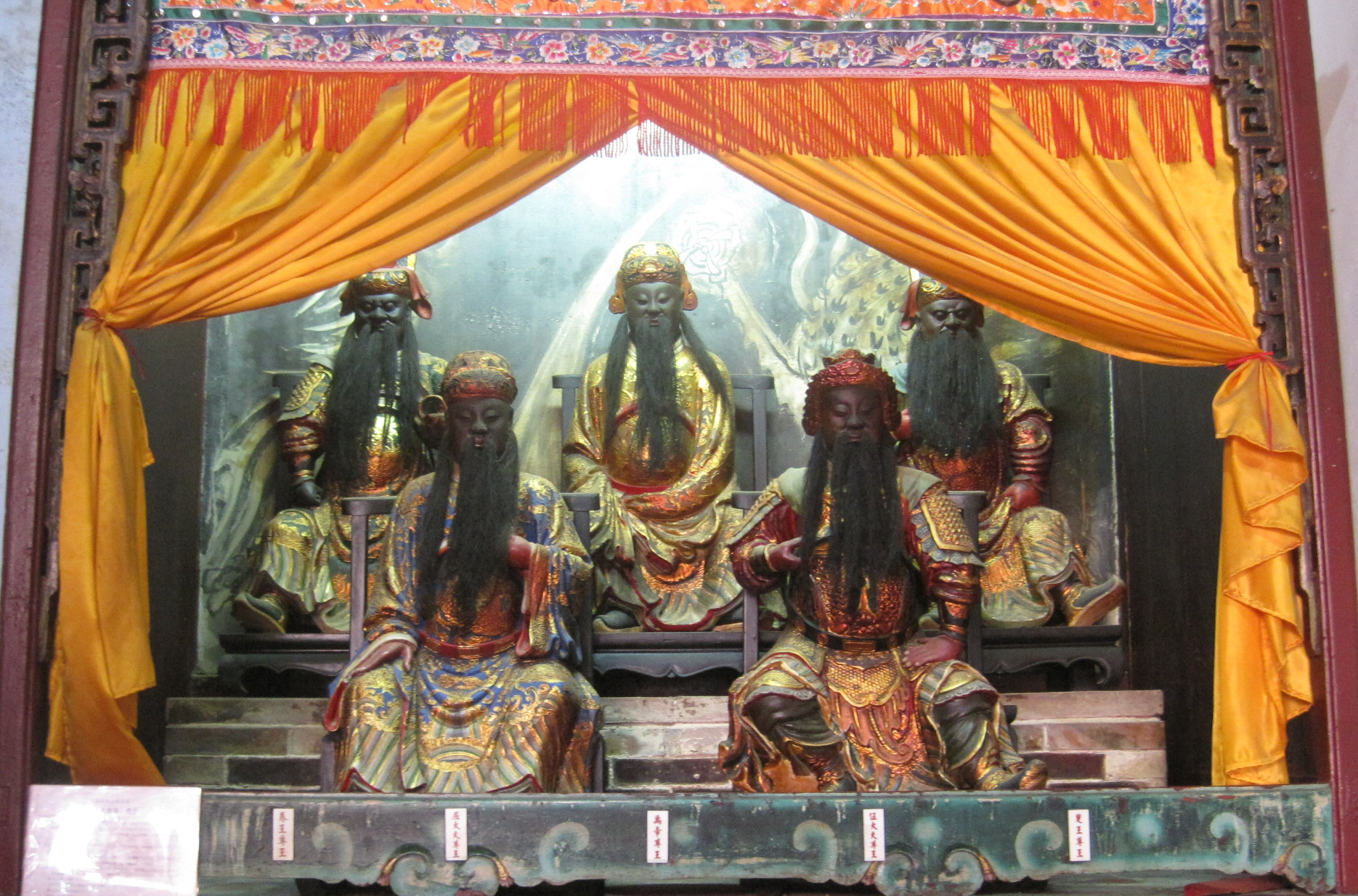
The Five Kings of the Water Immortals

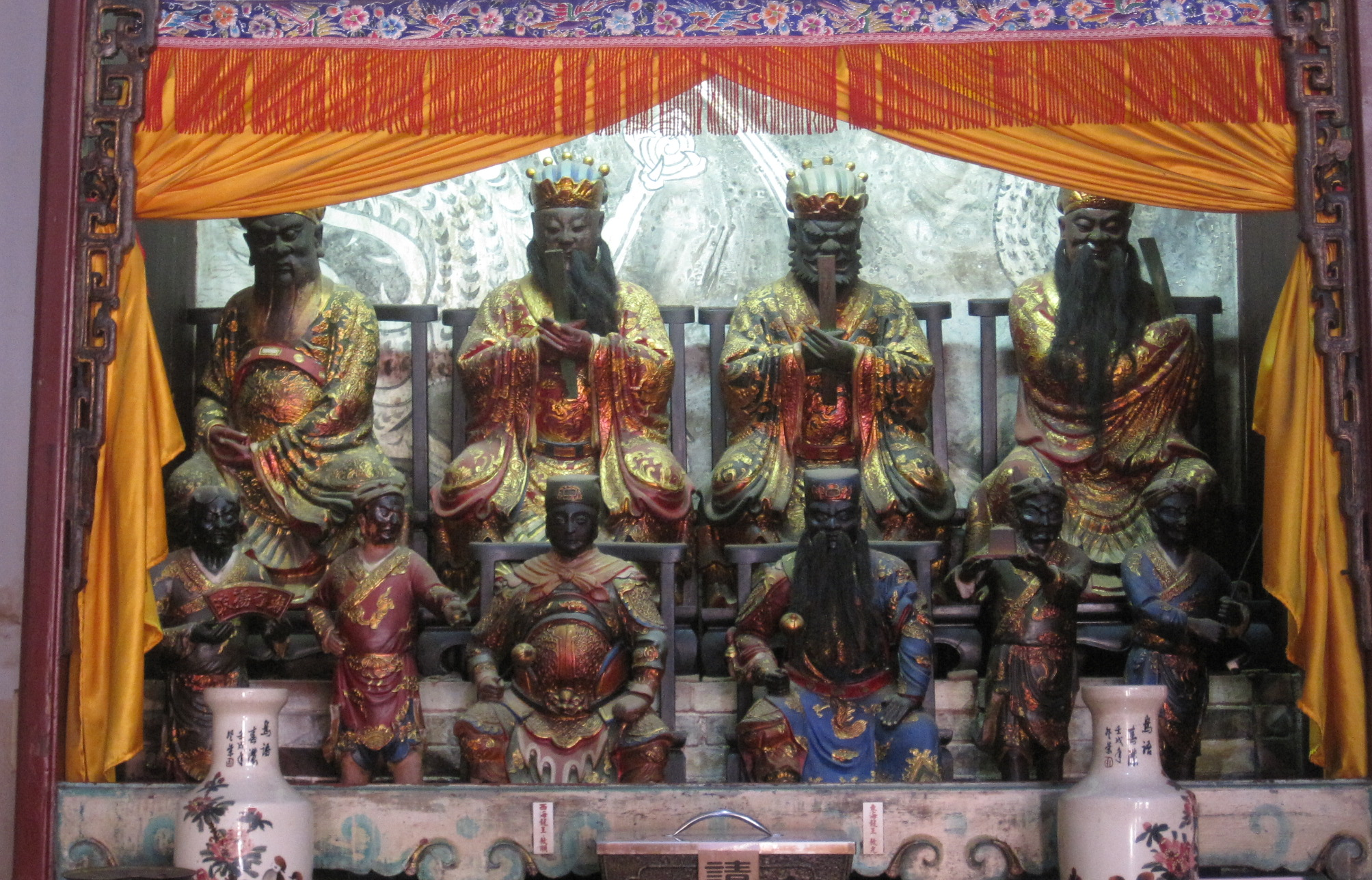
The Dragon Kings of the Four Seas

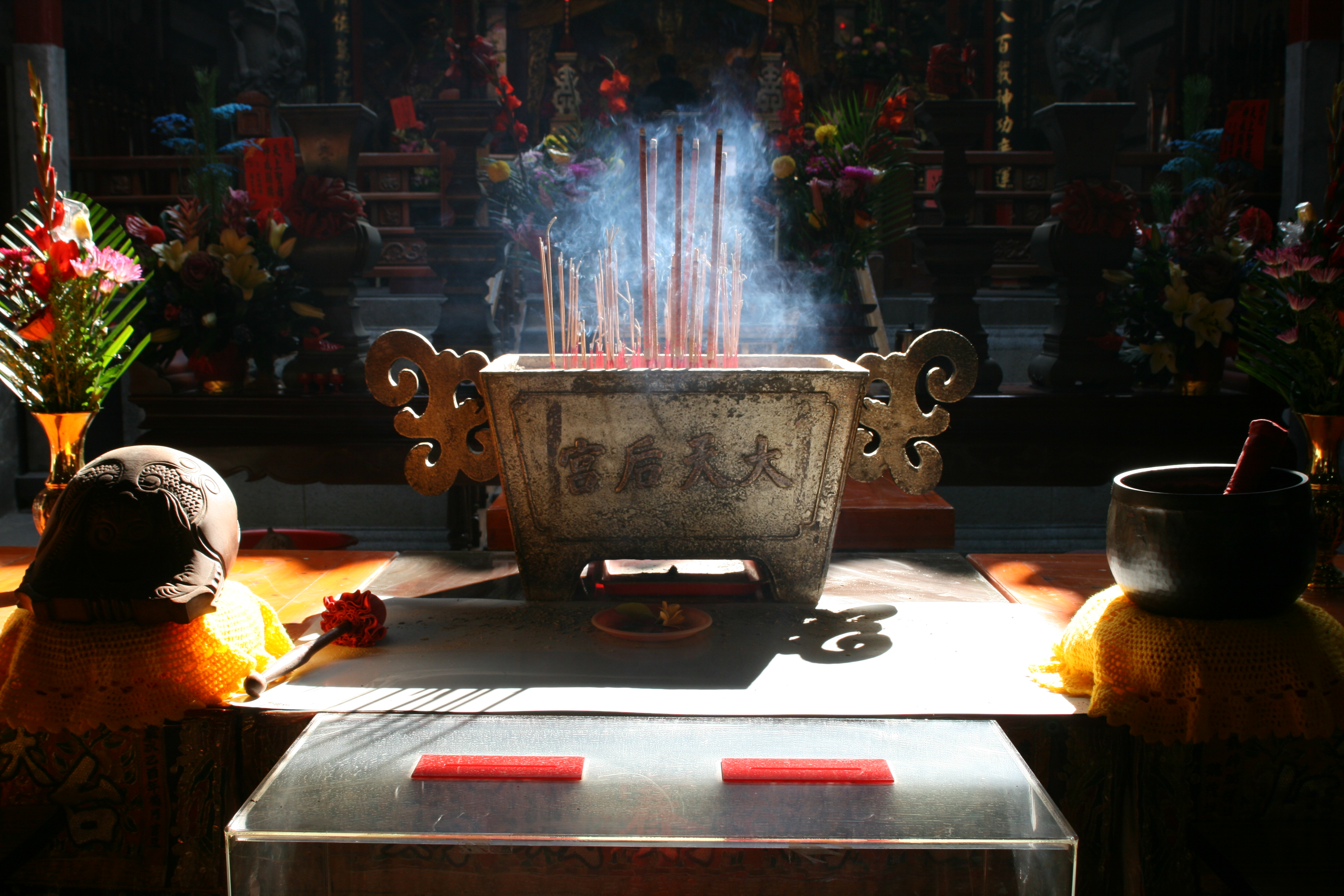
Incense burner

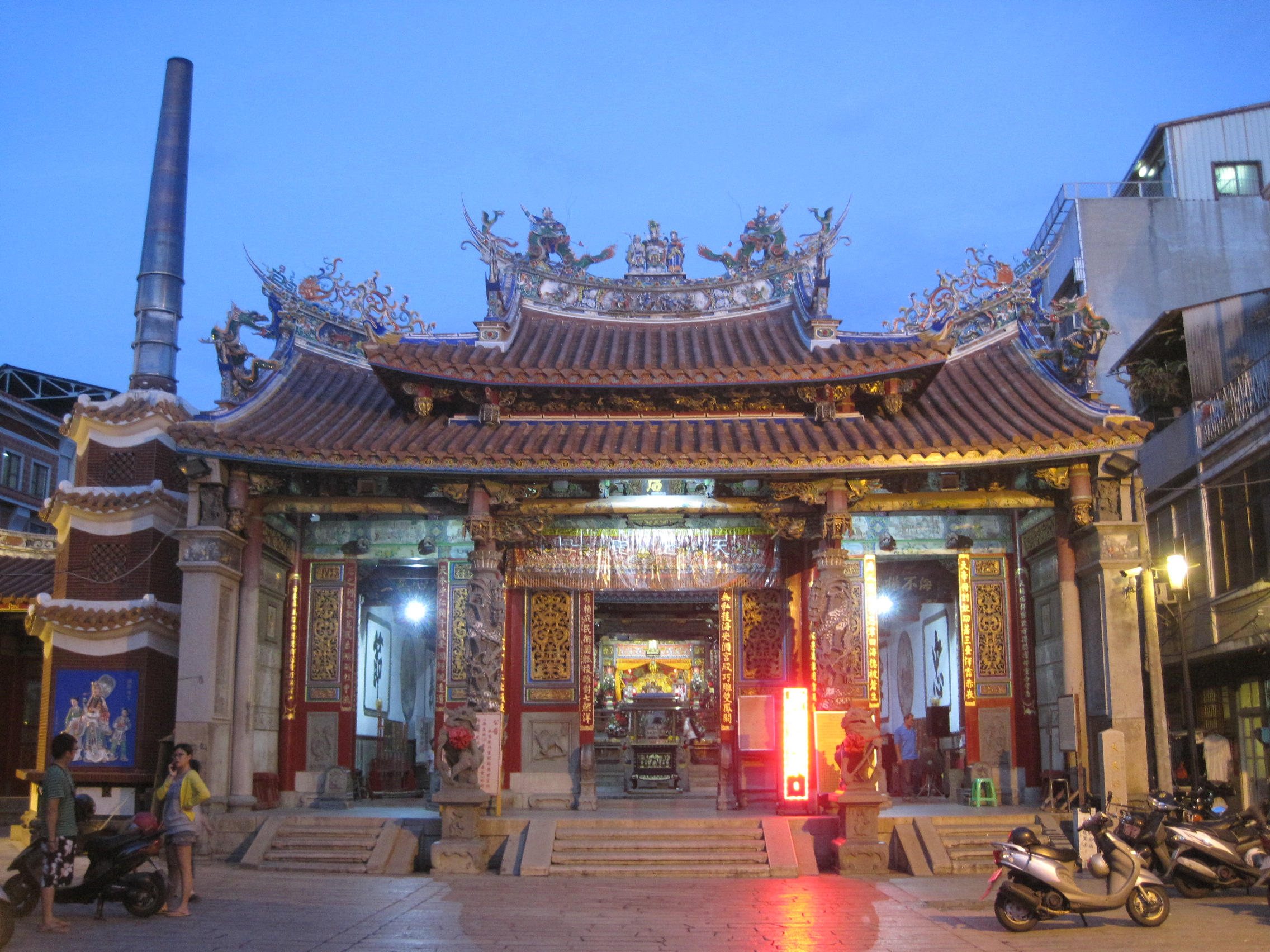
Main Hall in the evening

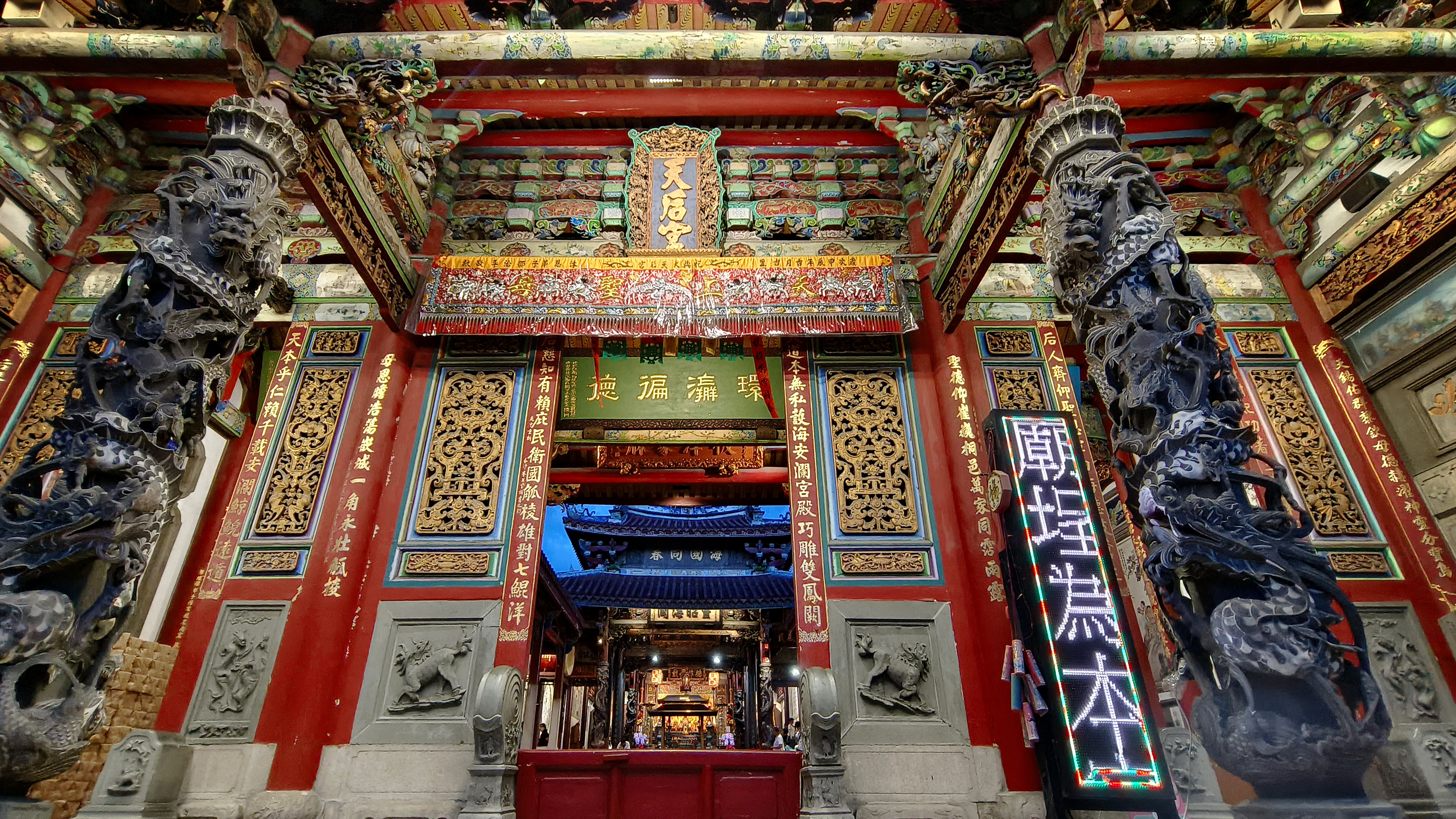
Front entrance at night

Front entrance

Main Shrine

Side entrance to back shrine

Front entance

== See also ==
- Qianliyan & Shunfeng'er
- List of Mazu temples around the world
- Beiji Temple
- Madou Daitian Temple
- Taiwan Confucian Temple
- State Temple of the Martial God
- Temple of the Five Concubines
- List of temples in Taiwan
