= Gushan Daitian Temple =

Temple in Gushan, Kaohsiung, Taiwan

- 鼓山代天宮
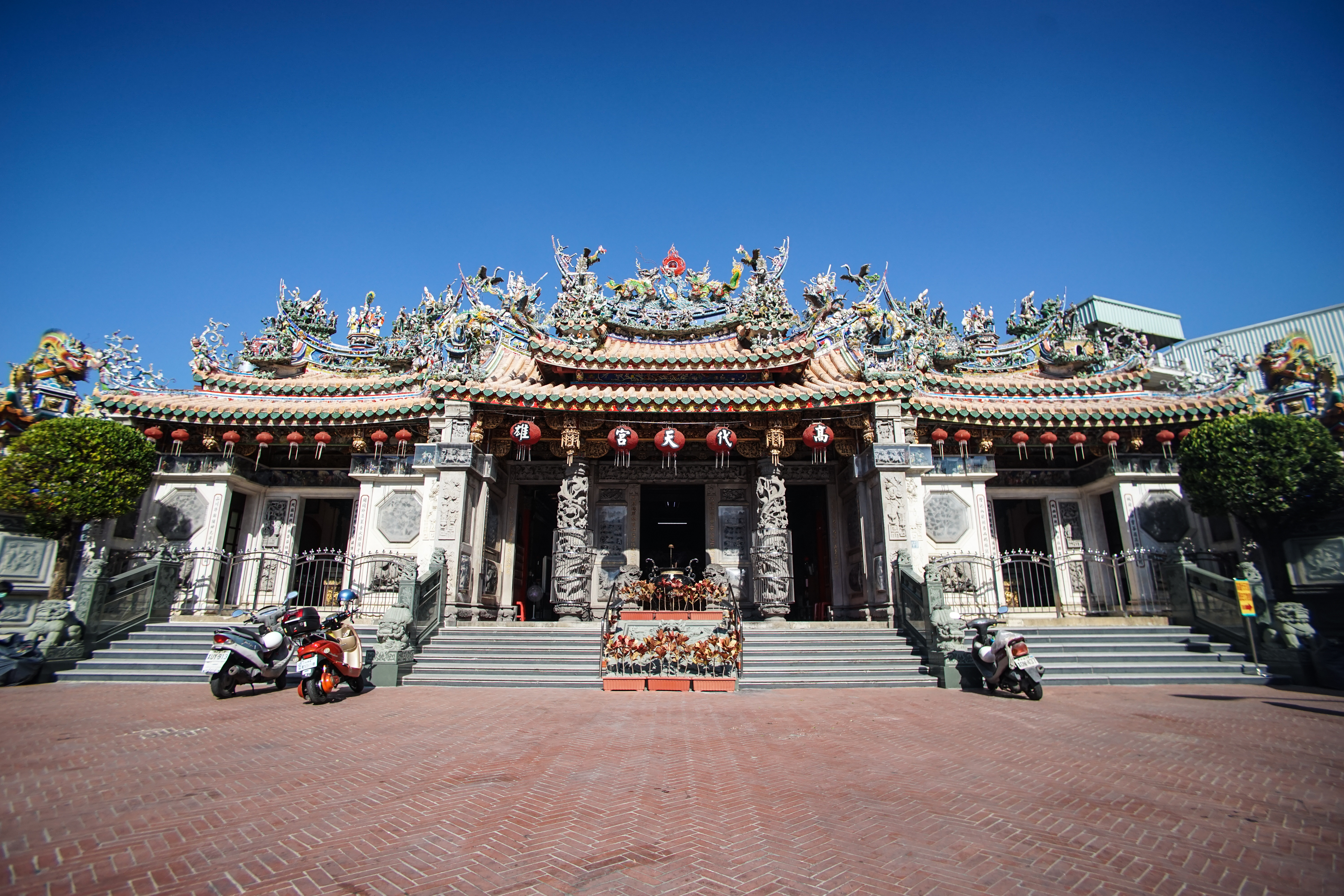

- Location within Kaohsiung

Religion
- Affiliation: Taoism

Location
- Location: Gushan, Kaohsiung, Taiwan
- Interactive map of Gushan Daitian Temple
- Coordinates: 22°37′21.4″N 120°16′15.9″E

Architecture
- Type: temple
- Completed: 1951

The Gushan Daitian Temple (Chinese: 鼓山代天宮; pinyin: Gǔshān Dàitiān Gōng) or Hamasen Temple is a temple in Hamasen, Gushan District, Kaohsiung, Taiwan.

== History ==
The temple was built in 1951 at the original location of Shuangye Elementary School, which was also the former site of the Kaohsiung City Government office.

== Architecture ==
The temple was built in traditional Fujian architectural style with East Asian hip-and-gable roofs. The temple building has three entrances, a front worship hall, a main hall, a rear hall and wings on both sides. The archway of the temple is in Northern Chinese architectural style and the wing rooms in Southern Chinese style. It features a museum which showcases works by master painter Pan Lishui (traditional Chinese: 潘麗水; simplified Chinese: 潘丽水; pinyin: Pān Lìshuǐ).

== Transportation ==
The temple is accessible within walking distance west of Sizihwan Station and Hamasen Station of the Kaohsiung MRT.

== See also ==
- Wang Ye worship
- Madou Daitian Temple, Tainan
- List of temples in Taiwan
- List of tourist attractions in Taiwan
