= Chang Ya-juo =

Mistress of Chiang Ching-Kuo (died 1942)

- 章亞若
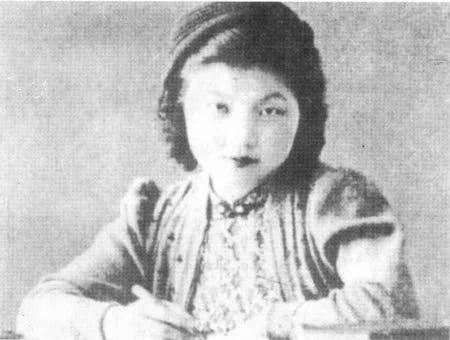
- Born: Chang Mao-li (章懋李); 1913; Jiujiang, Republic of China
- Died: 1942 (aged 28–29); Guilin, Guangxi, Republic of China
- Known for: Being the mother of Chiang Ching-kuo's illegitimate twin sons
- Partner: Chiang Ching-kuo
- Children: John Chiang (蔣孝嚴); Winston Chiang (蔣孝慈)

Chang Ya-juo (Note: traditional Chinese: 章亞若; simplified Chinese: 章亚若; pinyin: Zhāng Yāruò; Wade–Giles: Ch'ang Ya-jo) (died 1942) was the mistress of Chiang Ching-kuo and bore twin sons for him, John Chiang and Winston Chang. She was born in Jiujiang and met Chiang when she was working at a training camp for enlistees in the fight against Japan while he was serving as the head of Gannan Prefecture.

The twins took their mother's surname. Chang Ya-juo died under mysterious circumstances; after dining at a friend's house, she came home complaining of stomach cramps. She was admitted to the hospital in Guilin and died the next day.

After their mother's death, the twins were raised by Chang's brother and sister-in-law, Chang Hau-juo (章浩若; Zhāng Hàoruò) and Chi Chen (季琛; Jì Chēn), respectively, who were officially listed as their parents. They escaped to Taiwan with their uncle and aunt in 1949 and settled near Hsinchu.

After a legal process that included obtaining written declarations from Chi's sons, documents attesting to the father-sons relationship between Chiang Ching-kuo and the twins from retired general Wang Sheng (王昇; Wáng Shēng), the birth certificate listing Chang Ya-juo as his mother and DNA testing to prove that Chi was not his birth mother, John Chiang was able to obtain a new ID card listing Chiang Ching-kuo and Chang Ya-juo as his biological parents in December 2002. John Chiang officially changed his surname to Chiang in March 2005.

In 2006, Chiang stated he knew the identity of his mother's murderer, to be revealed as one of Chiang Ching-kuo's aides in his forthcoming memoirs, but that Chiang Ching-kuo had not ordered the murder and was not aware it was to take place.

== Family tree ==
Chiang family tree

Soong May‑ling 宋美齡	Mao Fumei 毛福梅	Chiang Kai‑shek 蔣介石	Yao Yecheng 姚冶誠	Chen Jieru 陳潔如
Faina Chiang Fang‑liang 蔣方良	Chiang Ching-kuo 蔣經國	Chang Ya‑juo 章亞若 (mistress)	Shih Chin‑i 石靜宜	Chiang Wei‑kuo 蔣緯國 (adopted)	Chiu Ju‑hsüeh 丘如雪	Chen Yao‑kuang 陳瑶光 (adopted)
Alan Chiang Hsiao‑wen 蔣孝文	Amy Chiang Hsiao‑chang 蔣孝章	Alex Chiang Hsiao‑wu 蔣孝武	Eddie Chiang Hsiao‑yung 蔣孝勇	Winston Chang Hsiao‑tzu 章孝慈	John Chiang Hsiao‑yen 蔣孝嚴	Chiang Hsiao‑kang 蔣孝剛
Nancy Xu Nai‑jin 徐乃錦	Yu Yang‑ho 俞揚和	Wang Zhang‑shi 汪長詩	Michelle Tsai Hui‑mei 蔡惠媚	Elizabeth Fang Chi‑yi 方智怡	Chao Chung‑te 趙申德	Helen Huang Mei‑lun 黃美倫	Wang Yi‑hui 王倚惠
Theodore Yu Tsu‑sheng 俞祖聲	Chang Ching‑sung 章勁松	Chang Yo‑chu 章友菊	Vivian Chiang Hui‑lan 蔣惠蘭	Chiang Hui‑yün 蔣惠筠	Chiang Wan-an 蔣萬安
Chiang Yo‑mei 蔣友梅	Alexandra Chiang Yo‑lan 蔣友蘭	Johnathan Chiang Yo‑sung 蔣友松	Demos Chiang Yo‑bo 蔣友柏	Edward Chiang Yo‑chang 蔣友常	Andrew Chiang Yo‑ching 蔣友青	Chiang Yo‑chüan 蔣友娟	Chiang Yo‑chieh 蔣友捷

Notes
- Dashed lines represent marriages
- Dotted lines represent extra-marital relationships and adoptions
- Solid lines represent descendants

== Notes and references ==
=== External links ===
- 蒋孝严谈母亲章亚若离奇死亡真相 [John Chiang reveals the truth behind the mysterious death of his mother Chang Ya-juo]. News163 (in Chinese). 7 August 2009.
