= Liu Chi-chun =

1970s First Lady of China (1908–1999)

- 劉期純
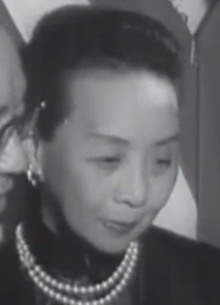
- Liu in 1961

2nd First Lady of the Republic of China
- In office 5 April 1975 – 20 May 1978
- President: Yen Chia-kan
- Preceded by: Soong May-ling
- Succeeded by: Faina Vakhreva Chiang

3rd Second Lady of the Republic of China
- In role 20 May 1966 – 5 April 1975
- Vice President: Yen Chia-kan
- Preceded by: Tan Xiang
- Succeeded by: Pan Ying-ching

Spouse of the Premier of the Republic of China
- In role 16 December 1963 – 1 June 1972
- Prime Minister: Yen Chia-kan
- Preceded by: Tan Xiang
- Succeeded by: Faina Vakhreva Chiang

Personal details
- Born: 1908 Suzhou, China
- Died: December 24, 1999 (aged 91) Taipei, Taiwan
- Spouse: Yen Chia-kan (m. 1924; died 1993)
- Children: 9

Liu Chi-chun (Chinese: 劉期純; pinyin: Liú Qíchún; Wade–Giles: Liu^{2} Ch`i^{2}-ch`un^{2}; 1908–1999) was the First Lady of the Republic of China (Taiwan) from 1975 until 1978 as the wife of Yen Chia-kan, former President of the Republic of China.

== Biography ==
Liu Chi-chun was born in Suzhou, Chekiang, and her family was one of the four prominent families in the city. She was the distant cousin of her later husband Yen Chia-kan. Yen's first wife died in 1923 because of obstructed labour. After that, Yen continued to follow the choice of his parents to marry her in December 1924.

She put much effort into looking after her new family, and she had nine children (five sons and four daughters). After she became the first lady, she continued to take care of her child, but not to participate on political topics. After Yen Chia-kan finished his presidency, she disappeared from public view.

After her husband Yen Chia-kan died on December 24, 1993, she died at the same date six years later (in 1999) because of diseases of the lung, liver and kidney at Taipei Chongqing South Road official residence. Her marriage lasted for 70 years. Finally, her remains were interred at the Wuzhi Mountain Military Cemetery.
