= Tseng Wen-hui =

First Lady of Taiwan from 1988 to 2000

- 曾文惠
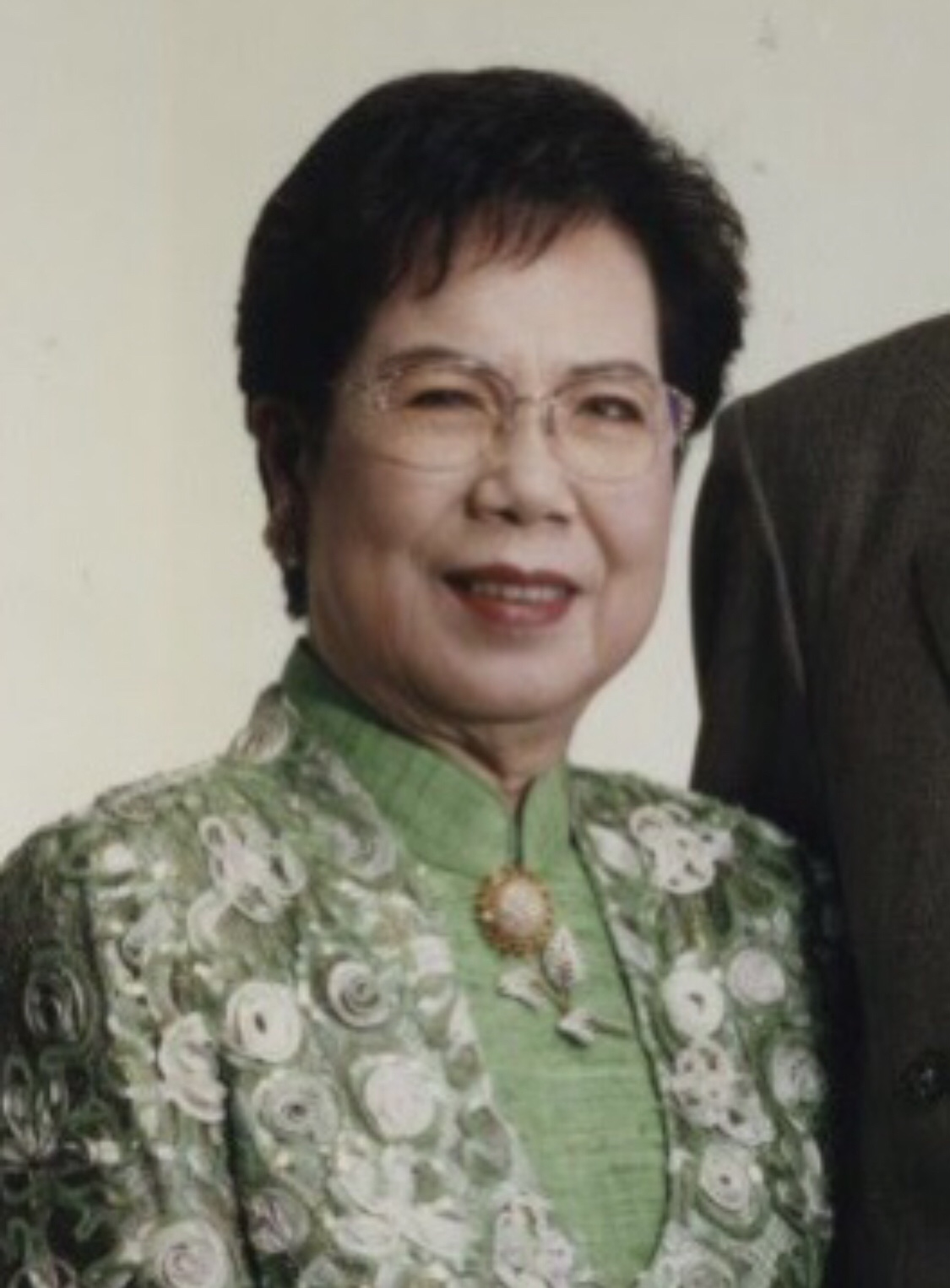

4th First Lady of the Republic of China
- In role 13 January 1988 – 20 May 2000
- President: Lee Teng-hui
- Preceded by: Chiang Fang-liang
- Succeeded by: Wu Shu-chen

5th Second Lady of Taiwan
- In office 20 May 1984 – 13 January 1988
- Vice President: Lee Teng-hui
- Preceded by: Pan Ying-ching
- Succeeded by: Hsu Man-yun

Personal details
- Born: 31 March 1926 (age 100) Sanshi Village, Taihoku Prefecture, Taiwan, Empire of Japan
- Spouse: Lee Teng-hui (m. 1949; died 2020)
- Children: 3
- Occupation: Homemaker, former First Lady of the Republic of China

Tseng Wen-hui (Chinese: 曾文惠; pinyin: Zēng Wénhuì; Pe̍h-ōe-jī: Chan Bûn-hūi; (born 31 March 1926) is a centenarian Taiwanese public figure, First Lady of the Republic of China (Taiwan) from 1988 to 2000, and widow of former Taiwanese President Lee Teng-hui.

== Biography ==
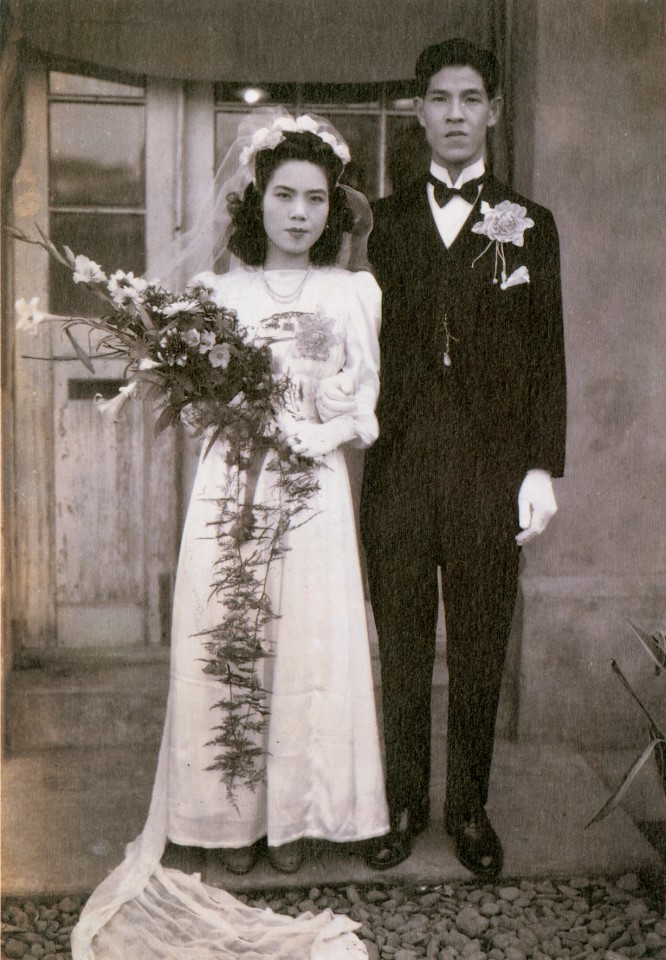
Newlyweds Lee Teng-hui and Tseng Wen-hui in front of a National Taiwan University dormitory.

Tseng was born on 31 March 1926 in Sanshi Village, Taihoku Prefecture, now known as present-day New Taipei City, Taiwan.

Tseng married Lee on 9 February 1949, when he was a teaching assistant in the Faculty of Agriculture and Economics at National Taiwan University. The couple had three children. Their eldest son, Lee Hsien-wen, (c. 1950 – 21 March 1982) died of sinus cancer. Daughters Anna and Annie, were born c. 1952 and c. 1954, respectively.

Politically, Tseng stated that she preferred to keep a low profile for her husband's sake. However, she became the subject of controversy in 2000 when New Party politicians Elmer Fung, Hsieh Chi-ta, and Tai Chi accused her of attempting to flee to New York City with a suitcase containing NT$85 million. In response, she filed a defamation suit against them on 29 March 2000, making her the only first lady in Taiwan's history to become involved in a lawsuit. The case involved the testimony of Wang Kuang-yu, which marked the first time that any Investigation Bureau director testified in a case under Investigation Bureau jurisdiction. The three were cleared of charges, but Tseng appealed the verdict to the Taiwan High Court. The appeal was submitted in April 2002, and the High Court began its own investigation in November. In December 2003, the High Court reversed the Taipei District Court's decision. All three accusers were fined NT$81,000. Hsieh refused to pay, and was sentenced to three months imprisonment.
