= Wu Mei-ju =

First Lady of the Republic of China since 2024

- 吳玫如
- Wu in 2026

7th First Lady of the Republic of China
- Current
- Assumed role 20 May 2024
- President: Lai Ching-te
- Preceded by: Christine Chow (Note: President Tsai Ing-wen is not married; post vacant from 20 May 2016 to 20 May 2024.)
Previous ceremonial roles
Second Lady of Taiwan
In role 20 May 2020 – 20 May 2024
Vice President	Lai Ching-te
Preceded by	Lo Feng-ping
Succeeded by	Vacant (Note: Vice President Hsiao Bi-khim is not married; post vacant since 20 May 2024.)
Spouse of the Premier of Taiwan
In role 8 September 2017 – 14 January 2019
Premier	Lai Ching-te
Preceded by	Wu Pei-ling
Succeeded by	Chan Hsiu-ling
First Lady of Tainan
In role 25 December 2010 – 7 September 2017
Mayor	Lai Ching-te
Preceded by	Hung Shu-chen
Succeeded by	Wu Mei-xiu

Personal details
- Born: 1964 (age 61–62)
- Spouse: Lai Ching-te (m. 1986)
- Children: 2
- Education: Tamkang University (BA)

Wu Mei-ju (Chinese: 吳玫如; born 1964) is a Taiwanese lawyer who is the seventh First Lady of the Republic of China since 2024 as the wife of President Lai Ching-te.

== Biography ==
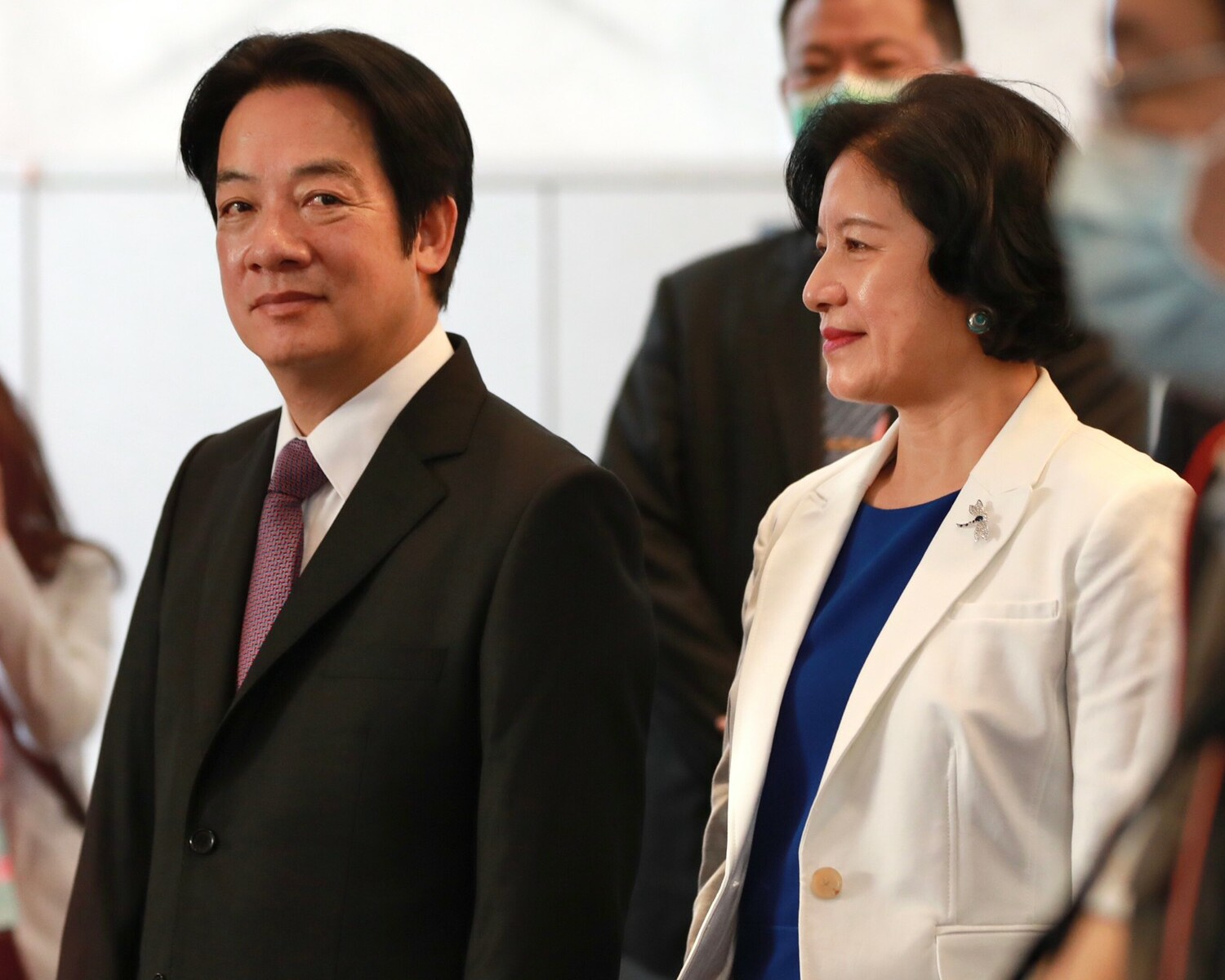
Wu Mei-ju and her husband Lai Ching-te

Wu Mei-ju and Lai Ching-te met when they accompanied their relatives and friends in the joint high school entrance examination, and got married while Lai was studying in the Department of Post-Medical Science of National Cheng Kung University. The couple has two sons.

She once worked for the Taiwan Power Company. After her husband was elected Mayor of Tainan City, in order to avoid a potential conflict of interest, she was transferred from the position of Tainan Business Division Director of Taiwan Electric Power Company to Kaohsiung's Hsinta Power Plant to take an administrative position.
