= The Amtrak Wars =

Novel series by Patrick Tilley

- Cloud Warrior (1983); First Family (1985); Iron Master (1987); Blood River (1988); Death-Bringer (1989); Earth-Thunder (1990)
- Author: Patrick Tilley
- Country: United Kingdom
- Language: English
- No. of books: 6

The Amtrak Wars is a series of novels written by British author Patrick Tilley. The series is a post-apocalyptic science fiction with some fantasy elements such as the existence of magic. Six novels and an illustrated companion guidebook were published between 1983 and 1990, with additional books planned but never completed. The books were optioned in 2007 by an Australian production company with the intent of turning them into a series of feature films.

== Backstory ==
In AD 2015, the old world was destroyed in a nuclear war, known in the books variously as 'The Holocaust' and 'The War of a Thousand Suns'. The United States and Russia were involved in this nuclear war but who fired the first shot is not known. The resulting war lasted only a few hours, but between the nuclear exchange and the years of nuclear winter that followed, the overwhelming majority of the human race was annihilated.

The most organised band of survivors is the Amtrak Federation. Four hundred American citizens survived the nuclear war in a vast underground bunker beneath Houston, Texas. Over time, their descendants established additional underground bunker-cities (known as divisional bases) linked by a high-speed subterranean rail network. Ruled by a self-perpetuating dynasty known as the First Family, the Federation expanded slowly in numbers and territory. By AD 2989, when the novels begin, the Federation sprawls across much of the south of the United States, from Colorado and Arizona to Mississippi. It is technologically advanced, employing microlight aircraft and 'wagon-trains', massive, 600-foot-long vehicles that act as land-based aircraft carriers and mobile HQs for heavily armed infantry personnel. The Federation's personnel are heavily susceptible to above-ground radiation and rarely live past their fortieth birthdays as a result.

Ordinary citizens of the United States who managed to survive the nuclear war and adapt to the radiation mutated into a clan-based warrior society known as the Mutes. Adopting a warrior ethos and tribal society similar to Native Americans, the Mutes are primitive, employing spears and knives in combat. Most are affected by a variety of radiation-induced infirmities, such as somewhat short-term memories and deformities varying in severity by individual. There are exceptions, Mutes with excellent recall who keep the tribe's traditions alive through an oral tradition of story-telling. These Mutes are known as 'wordsmiths'. The Mutes would not present a significant threat to the Federation's vastly superior technology and weapons except for the existence of Mutes known as 'seers', who can foresee their moves, and 'summoners', who can use magical forces that the Federation has no defence against. The Federation leadership does not publicly acknowledge the existence of Mute magic and outlaws all discussion of its existence, to the anger of front-line combat veterans, who have seen it in action.

The third major surviving faction is known as the Iron Masters, though they refer to themselves as the Sons of Ne-Issan. According to their legends, the Iron Masters fled the destruction of their homeland of Nippon in vast floating cities that drifted into Antarctic waters and then up into the Atlantic, eventually landing on the Eastern Seaboard of the former United States. They founded a country known as the Shogunate of Ne-Issan, stretching from Nova Scotia to South Carolina and inland as far as the Great Lakes and Appalachian Mountains. The Iron Masters have developed gunpowder and great steam-powered ships, but custom, religion and political decree forbids them from developing technology based on the 'Dark Light' (electricity). Due to the growing threat of the Amtrak Federation, some Iron Masters believe that without embracing the Dark Light, their nation stands little chance against the Federation's superior technology and will be destroyed, but official policy is to maintain the edict.

== Plot summary ==
In AD 2989, a 17-year-old, newly qualified Amtrak pilot named Steve Brickman joins the Lady from Louisiana, a wagon-train in its first major assault on the Plainfolk Mutes. Thanks to the Mutes' deployment of sorcery, the wagon-train is defeated and forced to retreat. Brickman is taken prisoner by the Mutes but not killed, due to a prophetic vision of the clan's seer, Mr. Snow, which suggests Steve will be instrumental in the fulfilment of the Talisman Prophecy. The prophecy is that a 'chosen one' called "Talisman" will arise to destroy the Federation and lead the Mutes to victorious domination of the world. Steve comes to admire and respect the Mutes; he falls in love with a "straight" (mutation-free) Mute woman named Clearwater and forges a bond of mutual respect with Mr. Snow's apprentice, Cadillac.

Steve eventually escapes from the Mutes and returns to the Federation, but his account of his imprisonment and escape is deemed fantastical. Labelled a deserter, he is stripped of all rank and is publicly disgraced. Privately, Steve is recruited by the Federation's top-secret intelligence organisation, AMEXICO, and is sent on a new assignment to capture Cadillac, Clearwater, and Mr. Snow, who are deemed of interest to the Federation. Upon learning that Cadillac has used information from Steve to build a primitive glider and fly it to Ne-Issan as part of a weapons and intelligence exchange between the Mutes and Iron Masters, Steve decides to pursue the capture mission into Ne-Issan. During this mission, Steve's loyalties become further conflicted between his affinity with the Mutes and his birth allegiance to the Federation, and he begins a risky attempt to play both sides against the middle whilst he looks for a way to escape his enemies on both sides.

Ultimately, the Talisman prophecy is fulfilled, at great cost.

== Main characters ==
- Steven Roosevelt Brickman – A wingman of The Amtrak Federation who is captured by the M'Call clan of Mutes. He gradually begins to regard them as equals, even though this goes against everything he has been taught. He falls in love with a Mute, Clearwater, and befriends Mr Snow and Cadillac. However Steve and Cadillac are constantly at odds with each other because of Clearwater, whom Steve stole from Cadillac, and their inherent distrust of each other. Steve possesses latent telepathic abilities that allow him to connect with his kin-sister, Roz, on occasion. At first this is completely unconscious, but over time he is able to contact her deliberately. It is theorised in the books that if he opened himself up he would have access to abilities similar to those displayed by Roz, though he does sometimes instinctively know what people are thinking. He also has a sixth sense for what is immediately about to happen, and is capable of matching the speed and running stamina of Mutes. He is also incredibly lucky, something which may be due to his latent telepathic abilities, his intuitive sixth sense or the fact that he was 'born in the shadow of Talisman' as the Mutes believe.
- Roz – Steve's kin-sister. She is several years younger, but the two share a deep telepathic bond. Whenever Steve is injured or under a great amount of stress her body becomes similarly affected. If Steve is shot, Roz will receive a similar wound. However this 'psychosomatic wounding' vanishes within hours, leaving no trace that it was ever there. Roz is telepathic and eventually develops the ability to create extremely realistic illusions in the minds of others, indistinguishable from reality. She was studying to be a doctor, but when her telepathic link with Steve is discovered, the First Family involve her in their schemes.
- Mr Snow – The wordsmith of the Clan M'Call. He is a wise old man and a summoner of the seventh ring of power (there are nine rings of power in total). He is very wise, but also has a sharp sense of humour. He has a great affection for Steve Brickman.
- Clearwater – A super-straight with bright blue eyes. She is an excellent hand-to-hand fighter and also a summoner of the third ring. Upon seeing her Steve falls deeply in love with her, and she with him. Despite their vast cultural differences they form a relationship.
- Cadillac Deville – Also a super-straight. He is Mr Snow's apprentice and a wordsmith and seer. Though brave, his lust for power and 'standing' often lead him to do stupid or selfish things. While in Ne-Issan, land of the Iron Masters, he develops a love for sake, which only increases his less attractive personality traits and robs him of his ability to see the future in the stones until quite some time after he has stopped consuming alcohol.

== Earth Magic ==
There are three types of gifted mutes, two of which possesses magical abilities. They are:

- Word-smiths – Intelligent mutes with eidetic memories. They remember the oral histories of their entire clan and are also the custodians of the Talisman prophecy. Word-smiths are highly valued, and play a leading role in their clans affairs, even more so than the clan leader.
- Seers – Able to see into the future and the past by reading 'special' stones. The events they are able to view are usually connected to the place the stone has been taken from. To a seer, these stones appear to glow when they come across them. When viewing the past or future they enter a trance like state.
- Summoners – Summoners possess many magical abilities. They are able to control the weather and the earth, producing intense storms, calling down lightning and even generating earthquakes. They are also able to move objects telekinetically and influence the minds of others, either controlling them directly, or implanting hypnotic urges that the subject is compelled to follow. The summoner Clearwater also demonstrated the ability to shield herself from projectile attacks with a wall of light, identify the site and degree of any injuries a person was suffering and communicate with animals.

== Books ==
1. Cloud Warrior (1983)
  This book opens with an examination of the character of a Mute named Cadillac, and his world-view. We learn of the Talisman Prophecy, Cadillac's status as a wordsmith and a freak, and his love of Clearwater. The story, however, is about Steven Roosevelt Brickman, an 18-year-old wingman (pilot) in the war against the Plainfolk Mutes. He is shot down, but is spared by the Mutes. He meets Cadillac, Cadillac's mentor Mr. Snow, and Motor-Head, the tribe's paramount warrior. He meets Clearwater, falls in love with her, and woos her away from Cadillac. He sees the gaps in his indoctrinated world-view, but still decides to escape back to the Federation, killing the jealous Motor-Head in the process. The book ends with Mr. Snow telling Cadillac and Clearwater that they will have a role to play in the Talisman Prophecy.
2. First Family (1985)
  Steve returns to the Federation and is captured and treated as a suspected traitor. Through a series of undercover agents, the First Family manoeuvers Steve into a position of weakness and desperation, then sends him back into the field as a member of AMEXICO, the AMtrak EXecutive Intelligence COmmandoes (agents are known as 'Mexicans') with orders to kill Cadillac and Clearwater. He is promptly attacked by a group of deserters, who steal all of his equipment and throw him out. He then finds his way back to Mr. Snow, whose tribe takes him in. After hearing that Cadillac and Clearwater have gone north to the land of the mysterious 'Iron Masters', Steve stows away on an Iron Master vessel.
3. Iron Master (1987)
  This book opens with an examination of the character of an Iron Master named Toshiro Hase-Gawa and his world-view. He is a Herald of the Inner Court, a secret agent of his Shogun. Steve discovers that Cadillac copied Steve's technical knowledge using wordsmith magic, and is making recon gliders for the Iron Masters, masquerading as Steve (since Mutes are supposed to be illiterate). The arrival of Steve, Cadillac and Clearwater throws the internal political groups into some turmoil, and Steve receives some offers. Steve agrees to help Cadillac with the gliders, in exchange for Toshiro's help in getting them all out of the country at the end. Toshiro then gets Steve to kill one of the seventeen daiyamo (domain-lords). They then escape to a secret First Family recon station with two other federation runaways, where they steal transportation and fly back to Wyoming. But this is according to the Family's plan, and one of the runaways is a spy.
4. Blood River (1988)
  Steve, Cadillac and Clearwater meet with triumph and disaster as they try to return to Clan M'Call, evading the clutches of both the Iron Masters and the disguised hunter/killer squads sent out by the Federation to purge the overground of renegade Trackers and deserters. Clearwater is seriously injured and only Federation medicine can save her; Steve uses his identity as a Federation agent to get her treatment.
5. Death-Bringer (1989)
  With Clearwater now safely in their hands the First Family hatches a plan to use her as bait to capture Cadillac and Mr Snow and annihilate the Clan M'Call; a plan in which Steve is forced to continue his double-role as loyal agent of the Federation and blood-brother to the Plainfolk. In an apocalyptic battle, Mr. Snow and the Clan M'Call are destroyed, save Cadillac. Steve returns to the Federation to take care of Clearwater, while Roz escapes the Federation and joins with Cadillac.
6. Earth-Thunder (1990)
  The "Great Mountain in the West speaks to the Sky with a Tongue of Flame", signifying the Talisman Prophecy is on the verge of fulfillment. At that moment Clearwater goes in to labour with Steve's child in a Federation hospital, and Roz conceives a child with Cadillac on the overground. The First Family celebrates their believed capture of the Talisman, but which child is the real chosen one, or are both part of the prophecy?

== Other material ==
There is also a rare guide to the Amtrak Wars world titled Dark Visions: an illustrated guide to the Amtrak Wars, ISBN 0-7474-0270-1 (Sphere Books, 1988).

== Revised edition ==
In 1998 Orbit Books reissued the Amtrak Wars series with new covers and in a revised form that saw the Amtrak Federation renamed as the 'Lone Star Confederation'. The final volume was also mildly re-edited to remove the definitive afterword/conclusion of the original series, leaving the book on more of a cliffhanger.

== Continuation ==
The final published volume ended with a cliffhanger, in which two of the main characters are killed, one of the three main civilisations is plunged into civil war, and two children are born with pre-ordained destinies. Since 1990 there have been no further additions to the series.

In a letter dated 26 August 1991 Patrick Tilley confirmed that both the fans and publishers wanted additional novels to be published in the series and he was pursuing the matter, but only if he could "make it good enough". Rumours circulated for several years that additional novels in the sequence were being written, reaching a height in 1999 when a seventh volume was listed for publication by several websites. Unsubstantiated rumours surfaced in 2001 that Book 7 would be called Ghost Rider, and that one of the characters apparently killed at the end of book 6 was not actually dead.

In 2007 Patrick Tilley once again hinted that the series would continue, although possibly only as a trilogy rather than six more books.

Tilley died in May 2020.

== Film adaptation ==
In 2007 the books were optioned by an Australian production company with the intention of turning them into a series of feature films. In 2008–09 Patrick Tilley wrote a draft of the first script, entitled like the book, Cloud Warrior, and the production company continued pursuing the project in 2010, showing the script and tentative production artwork to several companies at the Cannes Film Festival. The proposed movie series is entitled The Talisman Prophecy rather than The Amtrak Wars and continues the practice from the revised edition of naming the Amtrak Federation as 'The Lone Star Confederation'. Other changes include proposed variations to the design of Federation vehicles and technology from the books, and the moving of Ne-Issan to the Pacific Northwest rather than the Eastern Seaboard.
