= Christine Chow Ma =

Taiwanese lawyer and politician

Christine Chow Ma Chow Mei-ching
- 周美青
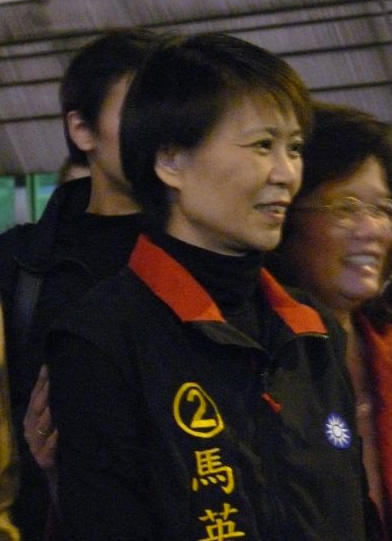
- Chou in 2008

6th First Lady of the Republic of China
- In office 20 May 2008 – 20 May 2016
- President: Ma Ying-jeou
- Preceded by: Wu Shu-chen
- Succeeded by: Wu Mei-ju (2024)

First Lady of Taipei
- In office 25 December 1998 – 25 December 2006
- Mayor: Ma Ying-jeou
- Preceded by: Wu Shu-chen
- Succeeded by: Kao Lan-hsian

Personal details
- Born: 30 November 1952 (age 73) Kowloon, Hong Kong
- Spouse: Ma Ying-jeou (m. 1977)
- Children: 2, including Lesley
- Education: National Chengchi University (LLB); New York University (LLM)

Christine Chow Ma (Christine Chow Mei-ching; Chinese: 周美青; pinyin: Zhōu Měiqīng; Wade–Giles: Chou Mei-ch'ing; born November 30, 1952) is a Hong Kong-born Taiwanese lawyer and former First Lady of the Republic of China from 2008 until 2016. She is married to Ma Ying-jeou, the former president of Taiwan.

== Biography ==
Chow was born in British Hong Kong in 1952, with family roots in Nanjing in Jiangsu province of mainland China.

After graduating from Taipei First Girls' High School, Chow studied law at National Chengchi University and graduated with a Bachelor of Laws (LL.B.) degree. She then completed graduate studies in the United States at New York University, earning her Master of Laws (LL.M.) from the New York University School of Law.

Chow was a high-school classmate of Ma Ying-jeou's sister. Chow and Ma married in New York. She worked as a research assistant, assistant librarian, and maître d’hôtel at a Chinese restaurant to support her husband through Harvard Law School. They have two daughters, Lesley (Ma Wei-chung, 馬唯中) and Kelly (Ma Yuan-chung, 馬元中). Lesley was born in 1980 in the United States when Ma was attending Harvard; she completed her undergraduate work at Harvard University, her MA at New York University, and her PhD at the University of California San Diego. She is the Ming Chu Hsu and Daniel Xu Associate Curator of Asian Art in the Department of Modern and Contemporary Art at The Metropolitan Museum of Art, New York. The younger daughter, Kelly, was born in Taiwan and completed her undergraduate studies at Brown University in Rhode Island.

== Career ==
Ma was employed at the Mega International Commercial Bank in Taiwan in its legal department. After Ma won the 2008 presidential election, she said she would continue her professional work. At the time, the only change she has made to her lifestyle was taking a chauffeured ride to work instead of public transportation.

In a change of course, Ma, in a 15 July 2008 CNN interview, stated that his wife would resign her post at the bank to avoid any conflicts of interest or arouse suspicions during his presidency. Her resignation marked a major change for the career-oriented First Lady.

== Personality ==
Chow is presented as a stark contrast from her predecessor, Chen Shui-bian's first lady, Wu Shu-chen; Chow is known for staying out of the political limelight and has rarely joined officials' wives at social or official functions. Chow has stated that she will not fulfill "traditional" first lady responsibilities (no former first ladies held an active occupation); she has, however, said that she will fill in on meeting and greeting dignitaries if she has the time.
