= Wu Shu-chen =

Taiwanese politician

- 吳淑珍
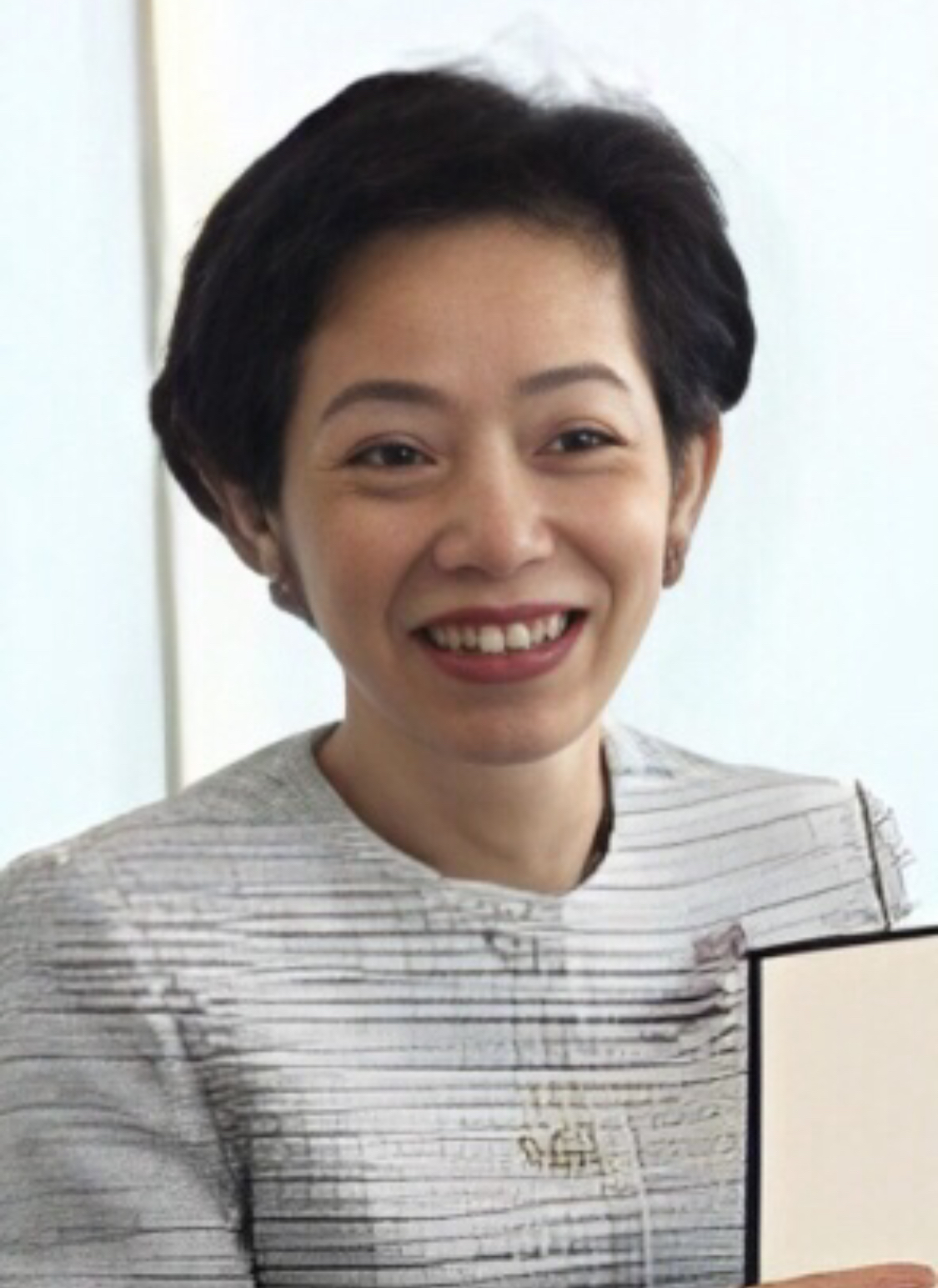
- Wu in 2002

5th First Lady of the Republic of China
- In office 20 May 2000 – 20 May 2008
- President: Chen Shui-bian
- Preceded by: Tseng Wen-hui
- Succeeded by: Christine Chow Ma

Member of the Legislative Yuan
- In office 1 February 1987 – 31 January 1990
- Constituency: Taipei City

Personal details
- Born: 11 July 1953 (age 72) Madou, Tainan County, Taiwan
- Spouse: Chen Shui-bian
- Education: National Chung Hsing University (LLB)

Wu Shu-chen (Chinese: 吳淑珍; pinyin: Wú Shúzhēn; Wade–Giles: Wu^{2} Shu^{2}-chen^{1}; Pe̍h-ōe-jī: Ngô Siok-tin; born 11 July 1953) is a Taiwanese politician. She served one term in the Legislative Yuan from 1987 to 1990. As the wife of President Chen Shui-bian, Wu was the First Lady of the Republic of China from 2000 to 2008. She is the only First Lady of Taiwan to have been charged and convicted of a crime; she was sentenced to a one-year prison term for perjury regarding political corruption during her husband's tenure as president. Her sentence has however been increased to 17 1/2 years, same as her husband.

== Marriage ==
Wu studied at Matou Middle School (麻豆國中), Zhongshan Girls High School (中山女中) and later attended College of Law and Business, National Chung Hsing University. During this time, she became better acquainted with her middle school classmate Chen Shui-bian, whom she would later marry.

On 20 February 1975, she married Chen in Taipei. Weng Yueh-sheng (翁岳生), Chen's academic advisor at the time, served as the marriage witness.

== Paralysis ==
On 18 November 1985, while with her husband on a trip to thank supporters after he lost the Tainan County mayoral election, the driver of a scratch-built farm vehicle ran over her three times. The driver, Chang Jung-tsai (張榮財), was a labourer. At the time of the incident, Chang was beaten by one of Chen's campaign staff. Due to the seriousness of the accident, Chang was also imprisoned for a month. Chen later dropped the charge against him and accepted Chang's apology. This incident left Wu paralysed and using a wheelchair.

Since Wu's ordeal, Chen and his supporters have often directly or indirectly referred to Chang as a hitman possibly hired by the Kuomintang (KMT) to commit a political assassination, as occurred during the martial law era against the KMT's opponents.

== Member of the legislature ==
In 1986, Chen Shui-bian was imprisoned for publishing an article, in which he criticized Elmer Fung, who charged him with libel. Wu represented her husband in the election into the Legislative Yuan. She was elected as the seventh of eight available seats. When Chen left prison, he became a special assistant to her.

On June 5, 1987, Wu became the first parliament member in Taiwan advocating the human right issues for the Vietnamese refugee victims on the Lieyu Massacre case with the formal questioning to the Ministry of National Defense (Republic of China) in the Legislative Yuan.

Upon leaving the Legislative Yuan, she decided to not run for public office again, and instead, focus on the role of being a politician's wife.

== Money laundering ==
On 14 August 2008, Chen Shui-bian called an evening press conference to admit to misstating campaign expenses in previous elections (two bids each for mayor and president), and had campaign monies wired to overseas accounts. Chen alleges that the wiring of the money was done by his wife and unknown to him.

There is also an investigation launched by Swiss authorities over a Swiss bank account bearing Chen's daughter-in-law's name: roughly US$31 million was wired to the account from Taiwan and was then forwarded again to an account in the Cayman Islands. Swiss and Taiwan authorities are cooperating in investigating whether or not there are instances of money laundering committed by members of the former first family. It is unknown whether or not the wiring of the Swiss accounts and the wiring of campaign money overseas by Mrs. Chen are related.

Chen announced the following day, on 15 August, that both he and his wife will leave the Democratic Progressive Party for good.

Chen and Wu, on 15 August, resigned from the Democratic Progressive Party (DPP) and apologized. Chen said: "Today I have to say sorry to all of the DPP members and supporters. I let everyone down, caused you humiliation and failed to meet your expectations. My acts have caused irreparable damage to the party. I love the DPP deeply and am proud of being a DPP member. To express my deepest regrets to all DPP members and supporters, I announce my withdrawal from the DPP immediately. My wife Wu Shu-chen is also withdrawing from the party." DPP Chairwoman Tsai Ing-wen also apologised to the public on behalf of the party: "In regard to Chen and his wife's decision to withdraw from the party and his desire to shoulder responsibility for his actions as well as to undergo an investigation by the party's anti-corruption committee, we respect his decision and accept it." Taiwan prosecutors on 16 August interrogated Wu and asked to explain overseas money transactions. A KMT party member alleged that Chen's wife bought jewellery to launder money. Hung Hsiou-chu of the KMT charged that Chen's family opened 4 bank accounts in Switzerland, with total deposits of 32 million U.S. dollars, which Chen remitted through his daughter-in-law, Huang Juei-ching.

On 17 August, Supreme Court Prosecutor's Office announced Taiwanese investigators took away boxes of documents, after search of Chen's home in Taipei, his office, and in Tainan, at the home of his wife's brother Wu Ching-mao. Chen was prohibited by prosecutors from leaving Taiwan. Chen has $21 million at overseas banks held in the name of family members. Shih Ming-teh, a former leader of Chen's Democratic Progressive Party accused Chen of laundering at least $85 million from an entrepreneur bidding for bank ownership in 2005. Coast Guard Administration spokesman Hsieh Ching-chin said: "We received the order from the special investigation unit around 21:20 last night saying former president Chen was barred from leaving the country." Chen's probe concerns NT $14.8 million (US$480,500) in special expenses from the government, while he was president, and his wife is on trial for corruption and document forgery. Prosecutors found at least NT $1.5 million had been spent on diamond rings and other luxury items for his wife.

Taiwanese judges, on 19 September 2008, denied prosecutors' plea to arrest Wu after she failed to appear in court for the 17th time citing ill health. Her attorney, Lee Sheng-hsiung stated: "According to the National Taiwan University Hospital it could be life- threatening for Wu to attend court. This is a grave situation so my client decided to respect the hospital's advice." Chiu Yi, KMT legislator said "the former family devalued the justice, they were the most shameless because Wu Shu-chen did not appear in the court for State Fund Affairs."

Wu was formally convicted and sentenced to a year in prison for perjury on 2 September 2009. In addition, Wu's son, daughter, and son-in-law also received one-year jail sentences of their own, but courts reduced the term to six months due to amnesty rules.

On 18 February 2011, Wu was examined by the Taichung prison hospital and was deemed to be too ill to serve, thus she was put under house arrest but will not be jailed.
