= Mega International Commercial Bank =

Taiwanese commercial bank

- Native name: 兆豐國際商業銀行
- Company type: Public
- Traded as: TWSE: 2886
- Industry: Banking
- Founded: 2006 (merger year)
- Headquarters: Taipei, Taiwan
- Area served: List: Australia; Cambodia; Canada; China; France; Japan; Malaysia; Myanmar; Netherlands; Panama; Philippines; Singapore; Taiwan; Thailand; United Kingdom; United States; Vietnam
- Key people: Chang, Chao-Shun, Chairman of the Board; Tsai, Yong- YI, President
- Products: Financial services including: Consumer banking Corporate banking Investment banking
- Revenue: ▲NT$ 39,410.9 million (2021) (US$ 1,425.5 million)
- Total assets: ▲NT$ 3,778,907 million (2021) (US$ 136,684.2 million)
- Number of employees: 6,559 (December 31, 2021)
- Parent: Mega Financial Holding Company Ltd.
- Subsidiaries: Mega ICBC (Thailand)
- Website: www.megabank.com.tw/en-us
- Footnotes / references Issuer of banknotes (1912–1942)

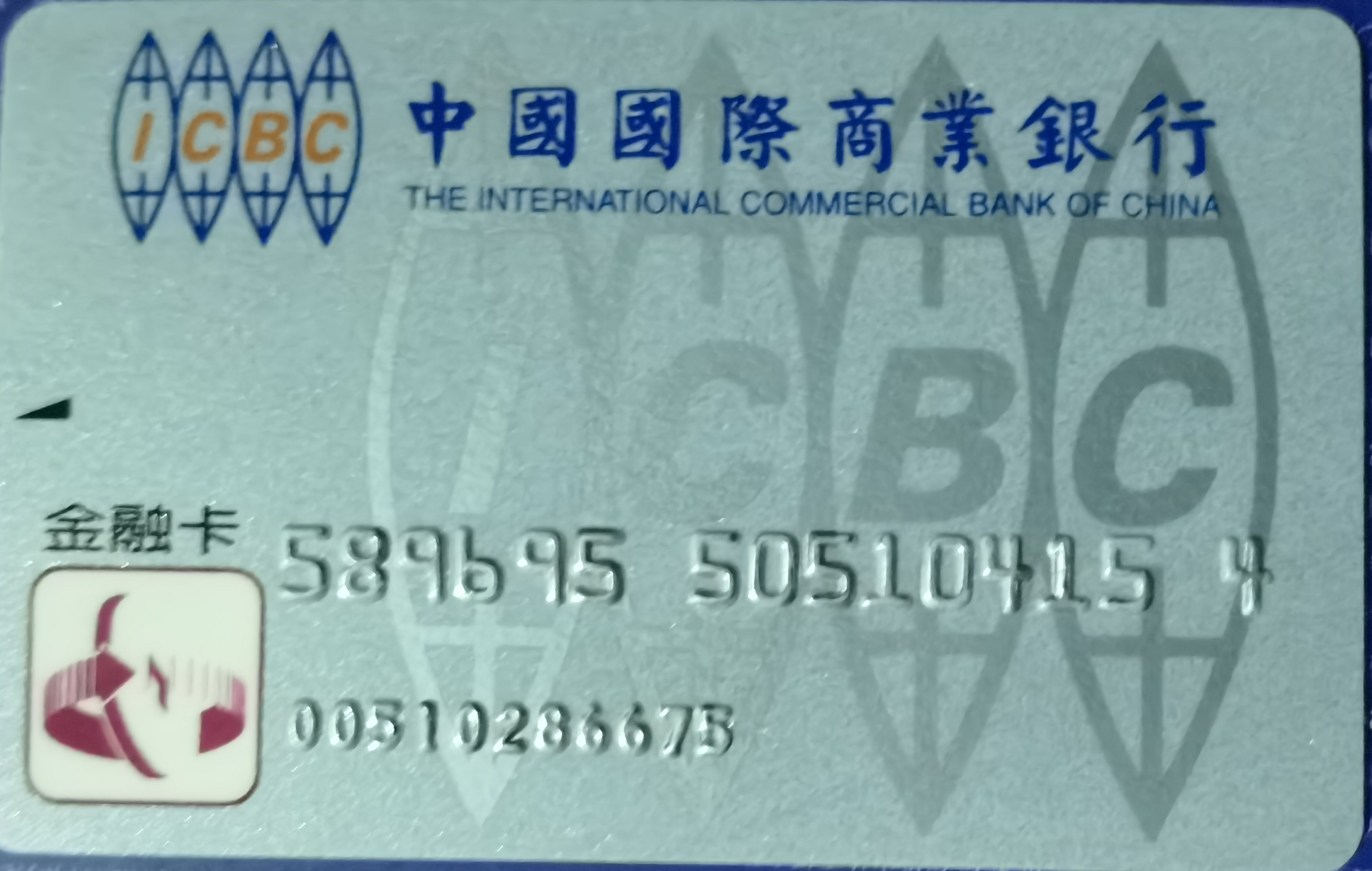
International Commercial Bank of China debit card

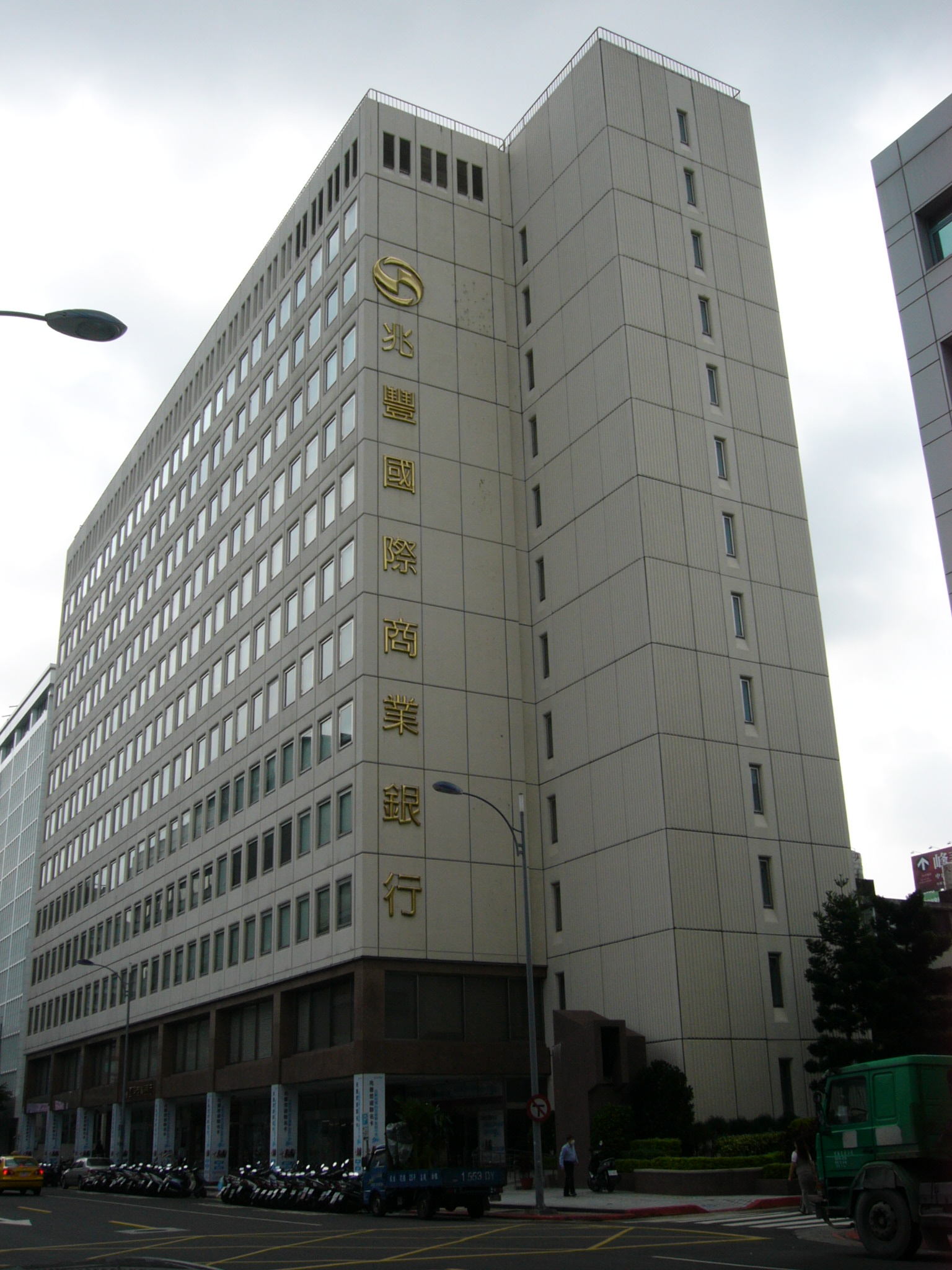
Mega International Commercial Bank main headquarter office

The Mega International Commercial Bank (Chinese: 兆豐國際商業銀行; pinyin: Zhàofēng Guójì Shāngyè Yínháng; Pe̍h-ōe-jī: Tiāu-hong-kok-chè-siong-gia̍p-gîn-hâng) is the second largest bank in Taiwan by tier 1 capital and a subsidiary of Mega Financial Holding Company. It has 108 branches (including foreign department) in Taiwan and 39 overseas units (excluding offshore banking branch). The bank is the sole domestic US dollar/Euro settlement bank designated by the Bankers Association.

== History ==
Mega International Commercial Bank Co., Ltd. was founded from the merger of the historic International Commercial Bank of China (中國國際商業銀行) and Chiao Tung Bank (Chinese: 交通銀行; Wade–Giles: Chiao-T'ung Yin-hang).

=== Roots in Mainland China ===
The International Commercial Bank of China was the name by which the Bank of China came to be known after its privatization in Taiwan in 1971. The Bank of China's reserves had been transferred from mainland China to Taiwan prior to the Chinese Communist Party's takeover of the mainland in 1949. Like most banks, the Bank of China was not immediately allowed to resume operations in Taiwan.

==== Bank of China ====
The Bank of China began as the Hubu (Financial Department) Bank of the Qing dynasty. It came to be known as the Ta-Ching Government Bank before being renamed Bank of China after the establishment of the Republic of China in 1912. The bank's headquarters were at 3 Hank'ou Road in the International Settlement of Shanghai. The bank, which was authorized to issue banknotes, broke free from the Yuan Shikai government's control in 1916 under the leadership of Chang Kia-ngau, and became a private, merchant-owned bank in 1923 when the cash-strapped Beiyang government sold all but a symbolic number of its shares to private investors. During the 1920s and 1930s, the Bank of China was by far the largest bank in China. In 1928, the Bank of China funded the government's creation of the Central Bank of China, and in exchange was allowed to remain independent. It was also chartered to serve as the nation's international exchange bank and was entrusted with efforts toward the promotion of foreign trade, the supply of foreign exchange, and the general financing of home industries.

==== Chiao Tung Bank ====
The Chiao Tung Bank was a direct successor of the Chiao Tung Bank/Bank of Communications established in 1908 during the final years of the Qing era. After the establishment of the Republic of China in 1912, the Chiao Tung Bank was authorized to issue banknotes backed by silver reserves. Government ownership of the bank was reduced to a minority during the instability of the Yuan Shikai regime and the Northern Warlords era. The bank financed the creation of the Central Bank of China in 1928 and was considered one of the Republic of China's top four banks.

==== Before the 1949 Revolution ====
The Bank of China and the Chiao Tung Bank both quickly became government-owned during the Shanghai financial crisis of 1935. Finance Minister H.H. Kung, who had worked to erode the independence of Shanghai's powerful bankers, forced both banks to create new shares that gave the government majority ownership. These new shares were purchased through overvalued government bonds meant to finance the government's deficit and increase the Central Bank of China's capital.

=== After the 1949 Revolution ===
After the 1949 establishment of the People's Republic of China (PRC) on the mainland, both banks' operations were split, though their management and most liquid assets were transferred to Taiwan. They were not immediately permitted to resume operations in Taiwan given the uncertain situation in the early 1950s. Both banks' assets on the mainland were seized by the Communist Party, which severely limited banking until the 1980s. The Bank of China's branches in Tokyo, Bangkok, and the Americas remained under the Taipei-based ICBC, while other branches in Asia, including Hong Kong, came under the PRC-controlled Bank of China. A new Bank of Communications was established in the PRC in 1987.

During the mid to late 1990s, many state-owned financial institutions in Taiwan were restructured and merged for greater efficiency. The Chiao Tung Bank was privatized in 1999, then underwent a series of consolidations. In 2002, it was merged with the International Commercial Bank of China under a single financial holding, which in 2006 came to be consolidated into a single bank—the Mega International Commercial Bank. It was argued at the time that the bank's former initials, ICBC, could lend it to be confused with the Industrial and Commercial Bank of China. However, the re-branding was controversial in Taiwan as many saw the change as a costly exercise meant to remove any reference to China from its name.

In March and April 2008, Mega International Commercial Bank was featured prominently in Taiwanese news because the wife of president-elect Ma Ying-jeou, Christine Chow, had declared her intention to continue working as the bank's legal counsel. In May 2008, she was permitted to retire from the bank.

In August 2016, in the wake of the Panama Papers scandal, the bank was fined $180 million for violating laws against money laundering by a New York State regulators in the US, which described its compliance program as a "hollow shell". The bank entered into a consent order entered into New York's Department of Financial Services to correct admitted violations, "including engaging an independent monitor to address serious deficiencies within the bank's compliance program and implement effective anti-money laundering controls." Former President Lee Tung-hui assigned blame for this malfeasance to Kuomintang officials who had run the bank for decades.

== Corporate structure ==
- Mega International Commercial Bank consists of seven groups of businesses:
  - Corporate Banking Group
  - Retail Banking Group
  - Investment Banking Group
  - Financial Market Group
  - Planning & Information Group
  - Risk Management Group
  - Administration Group
- There are a total of eight committees:
  - Loan Committee
  - Investment Committee
  - Problem Loan Committee
  - Fund Management Committee
  - Assets & Liabilities Management Committee
  - Trust Assets Screening Committee
  - Personnel Appraisal Committee
  - Occupational Safety & Health Committee

== See also ==
- List of banks in Taiwan
- Economy of Taiwan
- List of companies of Taiwan
