= Lesley Ma =

Taiwanese-American art historian (born 1980)

- 馬唯中
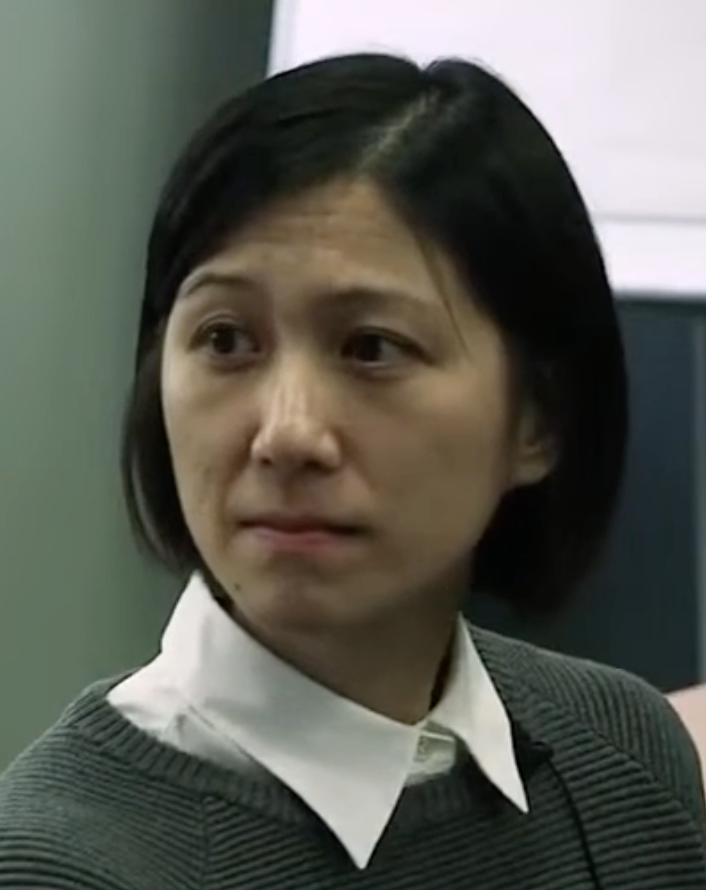
- Ma in 2019
- Born: Ma Wei-chung; 1980 (age 45–46); United States
- Education: Harvard University (BA); New York University (MA); University of California, San Diego (PhD)
- Occupations: Art historian; curator
- Spouse: Tsai Pei-jan (m. 2012)
- Parent(s): Ma Ying-jeou (father); Christine Chow Ma (mother)

Lesley Ma Wei-chung (Chinese: 馬唯中; pinyin: Mǎ Wéizhōng; born 1980) is a Taiwanese-American art historian and curator. She is the Ming Chu Hsu and Daniel Xu Associate Curator of Asian Art in the Department of Modern and Contemporary Art at the Metropolitan Museum of Art.

== Early life and education ==
Ma was born in the United States in 1980 to a prominent Taiwanese political family. She is the eldest daughter of former Taiwanese president Ma Ying-jeou and his wife, Christine Chow Ma. She was raised in Taipei, Taiwan, before returning to the U.S. for college.

Ma graduated cum laude from Harvard College in 2003 with a Bachelor of Arts in history and science. She then obtained a Master of Arts (M.A.) in museology from New York University in 2005 and earned her Ph.D. in art history, theory, and criticism from the University of California, San Diego, in 2016. Her doctoral dissertation, completed under professor Kuiyi Shen, was titled, "The Mountains and Rivers Remain: Abstract Painting in Postwar Taiwan, 1957–1968".

== Career ==
From 2005 to 2009, Ma was project director at the studio of artist Cai Guo-Qiang in New York. From 2009 to 2012, she was a teaching assistant in the visual arts department at the University of California, San Diego. From 2011 to 2012, she served as curatorial coordinator at the Museum of Contemporary Art, Los Angeles.

After serving as a researcher at the Asia Art Archive in Hong Kong from 2012 to 2013, she joined M+, Hong Kong's museum of visual culture, as founding Curator of Ink Art in 2013. Ma was in charge of the museum's ink art collection and exhibits.

On March 10, 2022, the Metropolitan Museum of Art in New York City announced that Ma would become the museum's inaugural Ming Chu Hsu and Daniel Xu Associate Curator of Asian Art in the Department of Modern and Contemporary Art, beginning April 2022.

== Personal life ==
Ma married Allen Tsai Pei-jan (Chinese: 蔡沛然; born 1980), a former classmate at Harvard College, in 2012. Tsai is a Taiwanese-American former fashion model. He graduated from Harvard with a degree in finance and worked as a banker in Germany. Their marriage took place in New York City. The marriage garnered media attention in Taiwan as it was kept secret by her father.

== Selected publications ==
- Ma, Lesley (2016). "Broken Ground: Chuang Che's Modernist Paintings of the 1960s" (PDF). Yishu. 15 (1): 19–31.
- Ma, Lesley (2021). ""The New Chinese Landscape" in the Cold War era". In Yamamura, Midori; Li, Yu-Chieh (eds.). Visual Representations of the Cold War and Postcolonial Struggles (1st ed.). Routledge. ISBN 9781003105398.
