= Patrick Tilley =

British science fiction author (1928–2020)

Patrick Alfred Tilley
- Born: July 4, 1928; Southend-on-Sea, Essex, United Kingdom
- Died: May 25, 2020 (aged 91)
- Education: Durham University
- Occupations: Writer, screenwriter, artist
- Relatives: Janine Tilley (wife)
- Writing career
- Period: 1975–1995 (as writer)
- Genre: Science fiction
- Notable work: The Amtrak Wars series

Patrick Alfred Tilley (4 July 1928 – 25 May 2020) was a British science fiction author best known for The Amtrak Wars series of books – a futureworld epic set on the eve of the fourth millennium in a world emerging from the ravages of a dimly understood global holocaust. The name "Amtrak" – appropriated by a specific group of survivors – is a name remembered from what is called "The Old Time".

Outside his authorship, Tilley worked as a graphic designer until 1968, then as a film scriptwriter. He and his wife lived in Gwynedd, Wales. He died on 25 May 2020 after a short illness.

== Bibliography ==
=== The Amtrak Wars ===
1. Cloud Warrior (1983)
2. First Family (1985)
3. Iron Master (1987)
4. Blood River (1988)
5. Death-Bringer (1989)
6. Earth-Thunder (1990)

=== Other novels ===
- Fade-Out (1975)
- Mission (1981)
- Xan (1986)
- Star Wartz: Tales of Adventure from the Rimworld (1995)
