= National Museum of Taiwan Literature =

Museum in Tainan, Taiwan

- 國立臺灣文學館
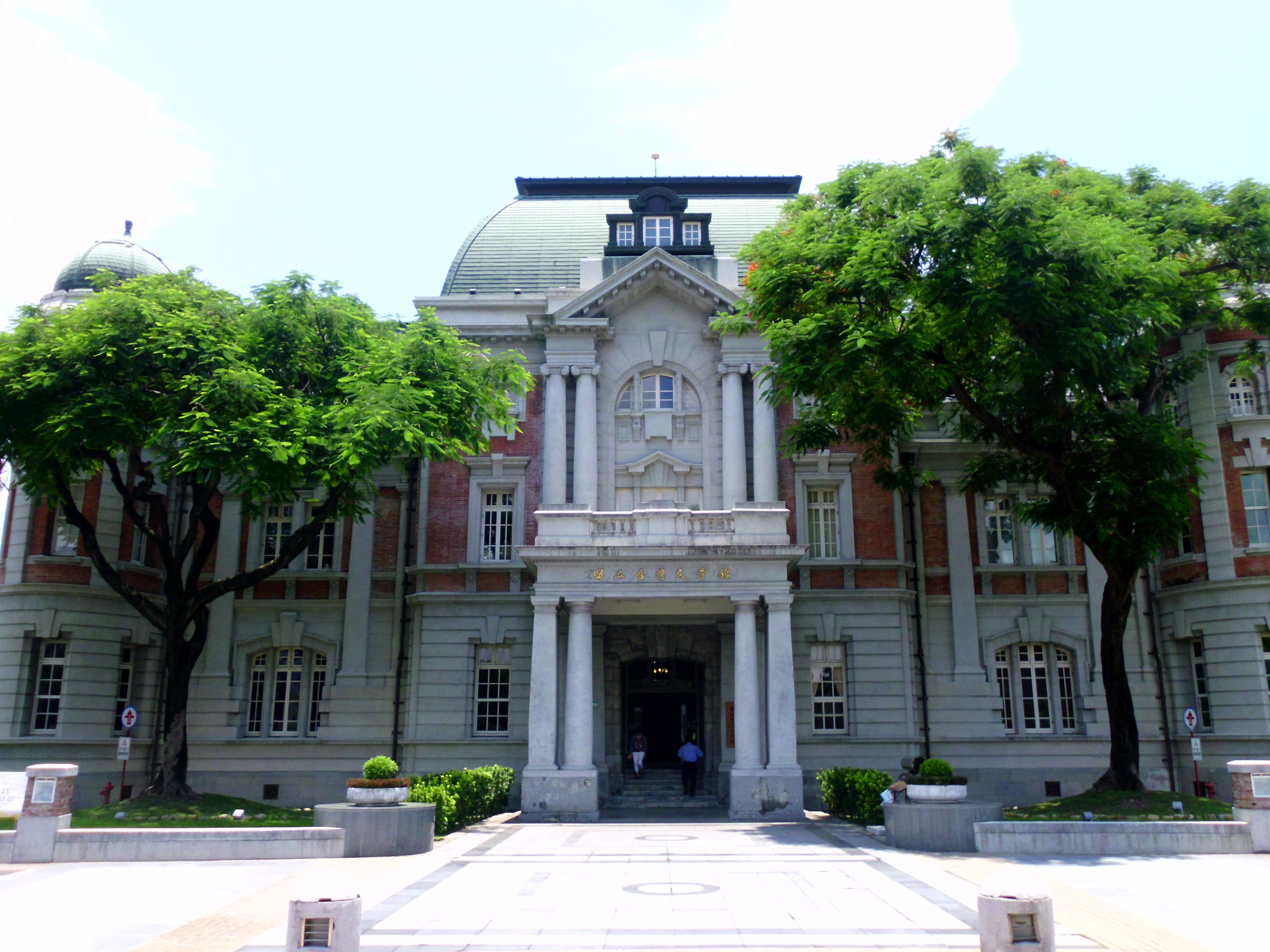
- Established: 17 October 2003
- Location: West Central, Tainan, Taiwan
- Coordinates: 22°59′30.0″N 120°12′16.0″E
- Type: Museum
- Visitors: 150,000 (2007)
- Director: Nikky Lin
- Curator: Lee Ruiteng (李瑞騰)
- Website: nmtl.gov.twm

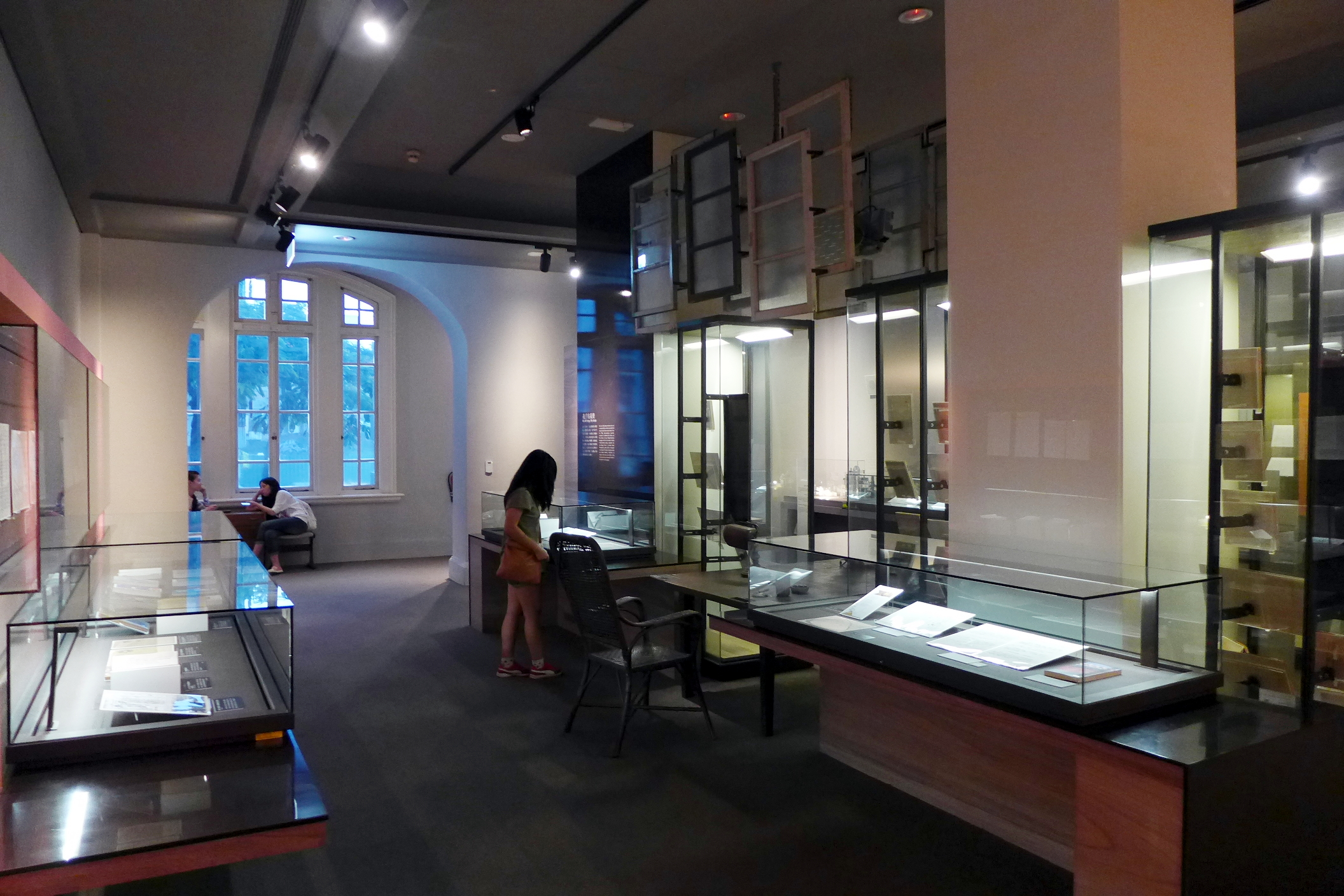
Exhibits inside the museum

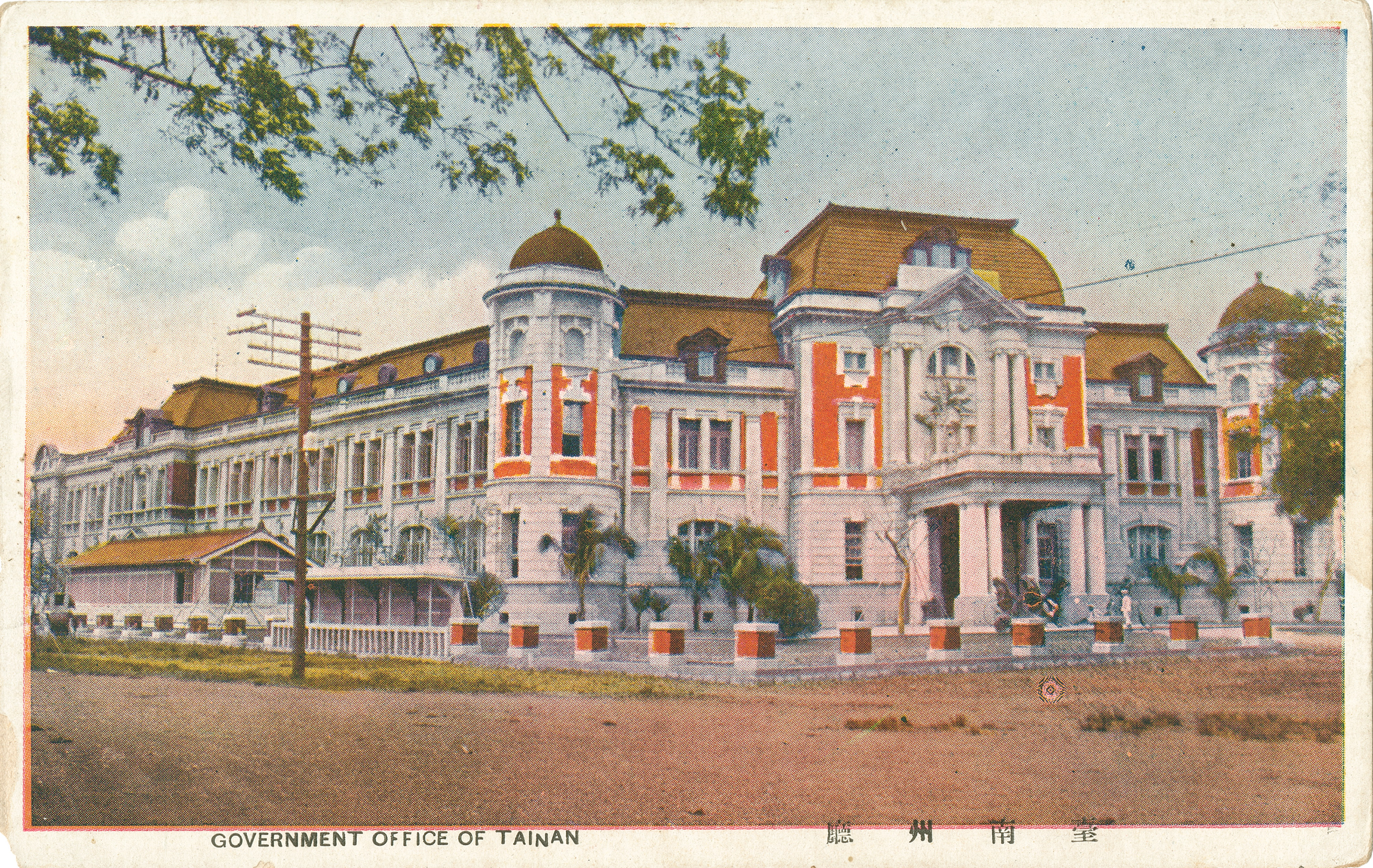
The museum was a government building of the former Tainan Prefecture during Japanese rule.

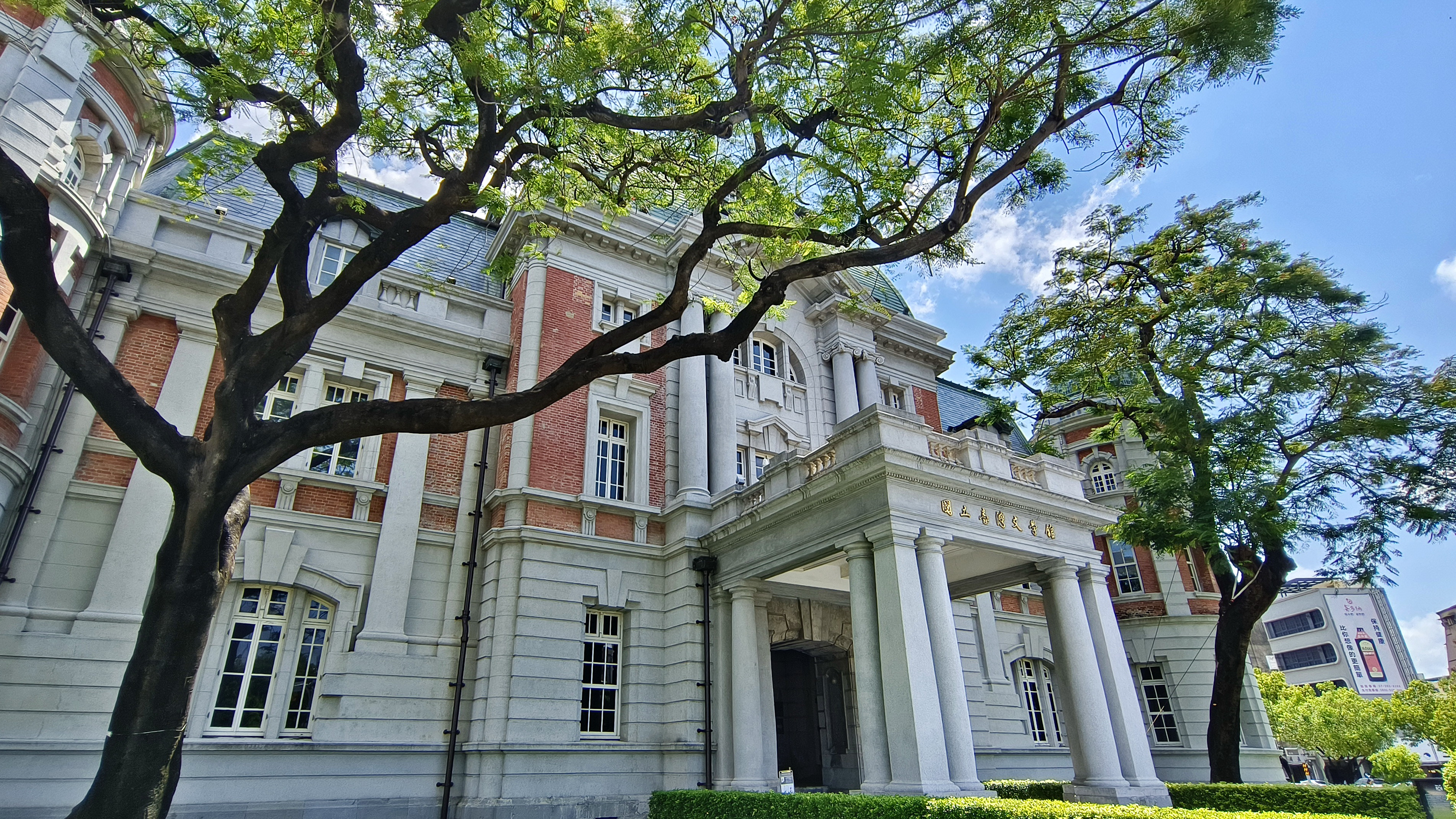
National Museum of Taiwan Literature

The National Museum of Taiwan Literature (NMTL; Chinese: 國立臺灣文學館; pinyin: Guólì Táiwān Wénxuéguǎn) is a museum located in Tainan, Taiwan. Operated by Taiwan's Ministry of Culture, the museum researches, catalogs, preserves, and exhibits literary artifacts, and is also the first national literature museum in Taiwan. As part of its multilingual, multi-ethnic focus, it holds a large collection of local works in Taiwanese, Japanese, Mandarin and Classical Chinese.

It was planned as a national-level organization to fill in a long-perceived gap in how modern Taiwanese institutions had handled Taiwanese literature as a field of academic inquiry and popular discourse. Tainan was chosen for its historical significance as a cultural center.

As of May 2023, it houses a collection of approximately 130,000 items. Formerly the Tainan Prefectural Hall, the museum was repurposed as the venue for the National Museum of Taiwan Literature in Jan. 2003, marking an important case of "historical building reuse" in official architecture in Taiwan. On November 10 of the same year, it was officially designated as a national historic site.

== History ==
The museum is housed in the Tainan Prefecture Hall, itself a national historical monument. The building was constructed in 1916 during the Japanese rule of Taiwan.

In November 1990, the Cultural Construction Committee of the Executive Yuan (now the Ministry of Culture) convened the National Culture Conference, where scholars and experts called for setting an authoritative institution for the collection and research of Taiwanese literary materials. In 1992, the original office of the Tainan City Government, formerly the Tainan Prefectural Hall, was chosen for the purpose. After administrative coordination and advocacy by scholars, the National Museum of Taiwan Literature was established and opened in 2003. In 2007, it was established as a fourth-level central administrative agency and officially named the National Museum of Taiwan Literature. In 2021, it was promoted to a third-level central institution.

Taiwan Literature Base, established in 2014 and affiliated with National Museum of Taiwan Literature, is situated within Qidong Street Japanese Houses, the Japanese-style dormitory complex on Chidong Street in Taipei City.

== Features ==
The National Museum of Taiwan Literature combines the national historic site of the Tainan Prefectural Hall with new construction. Parts of the historic building, the original Tainan Prefectural Hall, were completely destroyed by incendiary bombs fired by US forces during World War II. After the war, it underwent minor repairs, first serving as the Air Force Supply Command Headquarters and then becoming the Tainan City Government Hall. After the repairs, the historic section was largely restored to its former Japanese-period appearance and was listed as a national historic site under the name Former Tainan Prefectural Hall. The post-war additions converted it into a new building with two floors above ground and three floors underground.

The museum houses the cultural heritage research center of Bureau of Cultural Heritage.

== Transportation ==
The museum is accessible within walking distance South West from Tainan Station of the Taiwan Railway.

== See also ==
- Ministry of Culture (Taiwan)
- List of museums in Taiwan
- Taiwanese literature
- Tang Te-chang Memorial Park, another tourist attraction in Tainan situated near the National Museum of Taiwan Literature
- Yeh Shih-tao Literature Memorial Hall
