= Tung Fang Pai =

Taiwanese writer (b. 1938)

Tung Fang Pai (Chinese: 東方白; born in 1938) is a contemporary Taiwanese writer, whose work Sand in the Waves (浪淘沙) is one of the representative works of Taiwanese epic novels.

Born as Lin Wente (林文德) in Taihoku, Japanese Taiwan, Tung Fang Pai began to publish short stories and essays in college because of his love for writing. He once stopped writing for a while, but continued to write after his marriage in 1968. He received a scholarship from the University of Saskatchewan in 1965 and went to Canada for further studies. After retiring, he devoted himself to writing and has published works such as The Dying Christian (臨死的基督徒) and The Golden Dream (黃金夢). In addition to short stories, Tung Fang Pai devoted himself to writing Sand in the Waves, which brought Taiwanese historical novels to a peak.

== Reception ==
Taiwanese writer Yeh Shih-tao believes that Tung Fang Pai's works, due to his stay abroad, have more abstract and heterogeneous elements than those of domestic writers, which often surprise people. Tung Fang Pai believes that his writing style is influenced by his favorite writers, such as Leo Tolstoy, Anton Chekhov, and Ryūnosuke Akutagawa, and he aspires to write short stories that incorporate the characteristics of these writers. Tung Fang Pai's works often reveal his awareness of social problems and his concern for his characters. His writing techniques often use allegory to satirize the irrational phenomena in society.
