= Beiqu =

Beiqu may refer to:

- Beiqu (Chinese: 北曲; lit. 'Northern tune'), another term for zaju (13th–14th centuries)
- North District, Tainan, Taiwan
- North District, Hsinchu, Taiwan
- North District, Taichung, Taiwan
- North District, Hong Kong
