= Yeh Shih-tao Literature Memorial Hall =

Memorial hall in West Central, Tainan, Taiwan

Yeh-Shyr-Tau Literary Memorial Museum
- 葉石濤文學紀念館
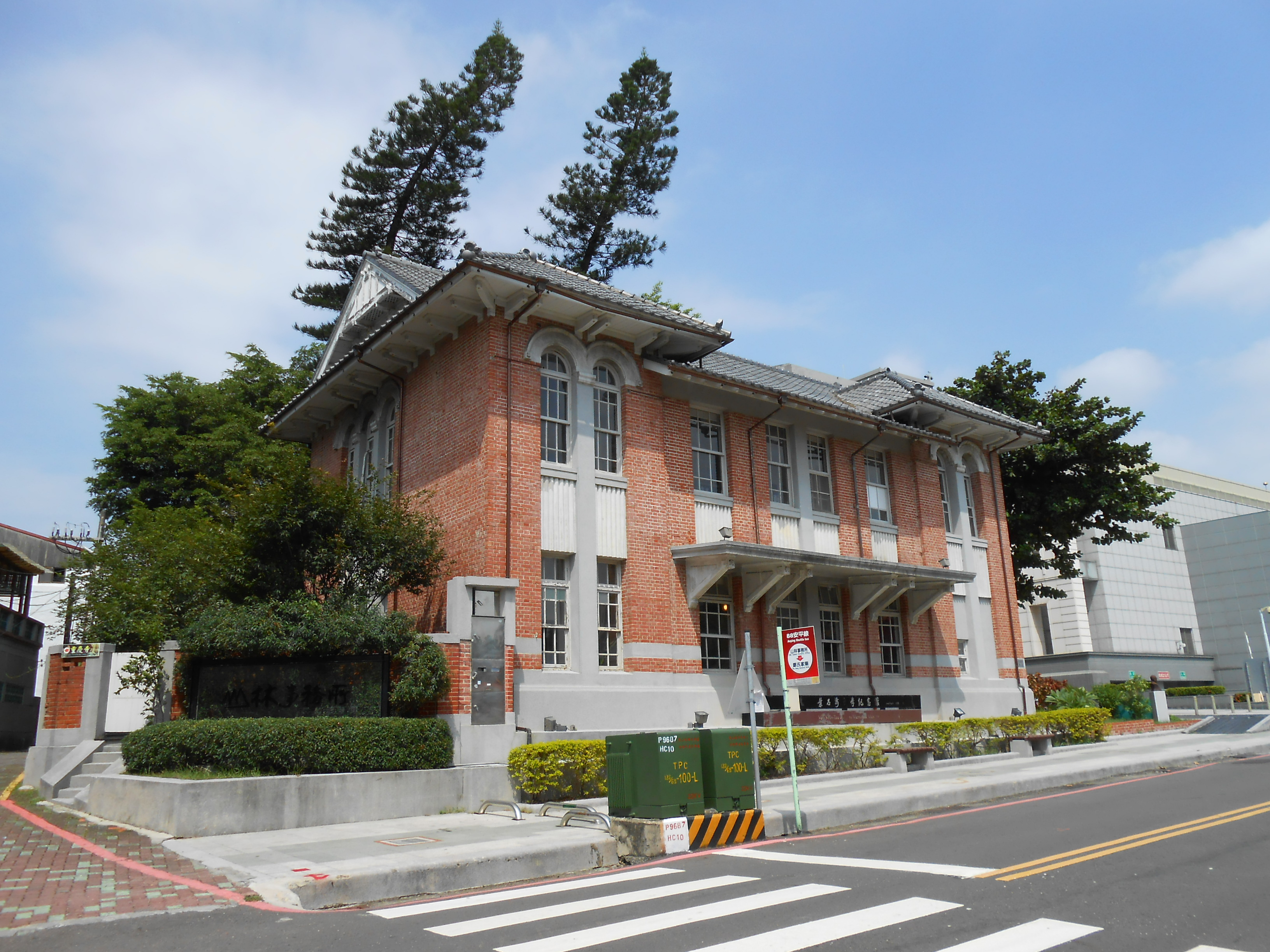
- Interactive map of the Yeh-Shyr-Tau Literary Memorial Museum area

General information
- Type: memorial hall
- Location: West Central, Tainan, Taiwan
- Coordinates: 22°59′27.4″N 120°12′13.3″E
- Opened: 11 August 2012

The Yeh-Shyr-Tau Literary Memorial Museum (traditional Chinese: 葉石濤文學紀念館; simplified Chinese: 叶石涛文学纪念馆; pinyin: Yè Shítāo Wénxué Jìniànguǎn) is a memorial hall dedicated to Yeh Shih-tao in West Central District, Tainan, Taiwan.

== History ==
The building where the memorial hall is housed today used to be the Tainan Forestry Affairs Office. In 2002, the building was designed as a historical building by Tainan City Government. The building was then converted into Yeh Shih-tao Literature Memorial Hall which was opened on 11 August 2012 by the Bureau of Cultural Affairs of the city government to commemorate and pay tribute to Yeh Shih-tao, a Tainan-born Taiwanese literature legend and writer. The opening ceremony was attended by Tainan Mayor William Lai.

== Architecture ==
The building has two floors. The first floor consists of the main exhibition floor, displaying Yeh's commemorative souvenirs. The second floor consists of the restoration of his room and a little theater showing the introduction of him and his accomplishments.

== Transportation ==
The building is accessible within walking distance south west of Tainan Station of Taiwan Railway.

== See also ==
- List of tourist attractions in Taiwan
- National Museum of Taiwan Literature
