= Tang Te-chang =

Thng Tek-chiong
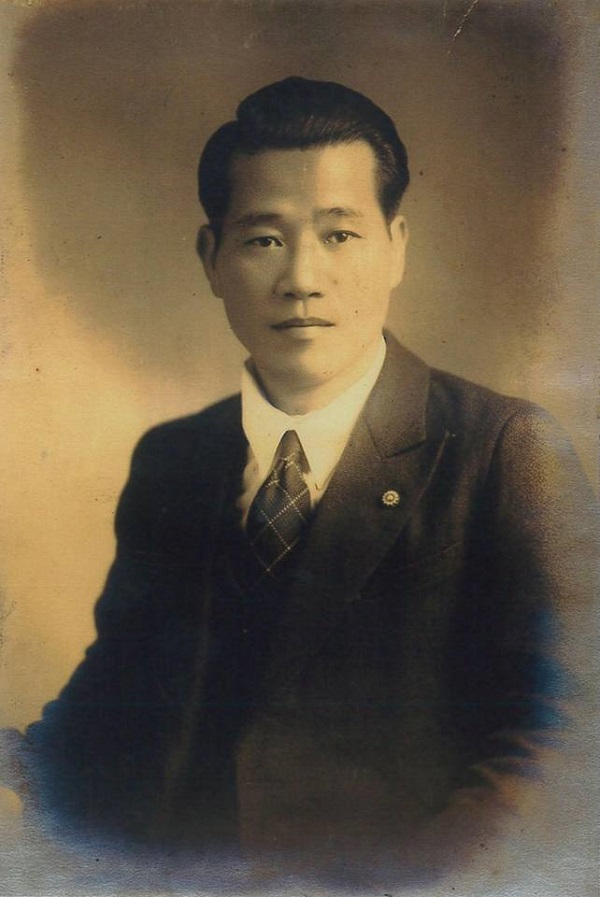
- Born: 6 January 1907; Tapani Subprefecture, Tainan Prefecture, Taiwan, Empire of Japan
- Died: 13 March 1947 (aged 40); Tainan, Taiwan
- Occupations: police officer, lawyer

Thng Tek-chiong (POJ: Thng Tek-chiong; 6 January 1907 – 13 March 1947), also known as Tokushō Sakai (坂井 德章, Sakai Tokushō), was a Taiwanese lawyer of Japanese descent, born in Tainan Prefecture during Japanese rule. He was killed in the February 28 Incident.

== Life ==
Tekchiong's parents Tokuzo Sakai and Thng Gio̍k married in 1902. At the time, marriages between Japanese and Taiwanese were illegal, and Tekchiong took his maternal surname. Tekchiong's father was a police officer. He died when Tekchiong was eight years old, as a result of attacks on police stations organized by supporters of Û Chheng-hong. The family was not compensated, and Tekchiong grew up poor. He received some financial help from a traditional Han physician named Iûⁿ Choân. He graduated from Tapani Elementary School, but dropped out of Tainan Normal School (now the National University of Tainan), and worked on his family's farm, and then later at a sugar refinery. At that time, he enhanced his knowledge and fighting skills by learning Classic Sinitic language, Four Books and Five Classics, martial arts and Japanese martial arts. In 1927, he passed the formal civil service examination and became a Tainan Prefecture Patrol officer deployed to Tōseki District (東石郡). He married a year later. Tekchiong left law enforcement to pursue legal studies in Japan at the age of 32. He returned to Taiwan in 1943.

== February 28 incident ==
Thng Tekchiong was elected mayoral candidate by all Tainan senators, leaders of villages citizen organizations, and student representatives in 1947, when the February 28 incident occurred.

After the 21st Division of the National Revolutionary Army (NRA) descended on Tainan, about twenty gendarmes broke into Tekchiong's house on 11 March 1947, to arrest him for the crime of rebellion. During his arrest, Tekchiong burned a list containing the names of people on the Settlement Committee, an action regarded to have saved their lives. Tekchiong was interrogated by NRA soldiers regarding his ancestry, to which Thng reportedly replied, "I was born in Taiwan, I was raised in Taiwan. Am I not Taiwanese?" They insisted he was Japanese and Tekchiong challenged them to question him in the Japanese language. The next day, Tekchiong was hung upside down, tortured and pilloried. On 13 March, Tekchiong was shot at Taishō Park (大正公園).
