= Tainan Children's Science Museum =

Museum in North, Tainan, Taiwan

- 台南市兒童科學館
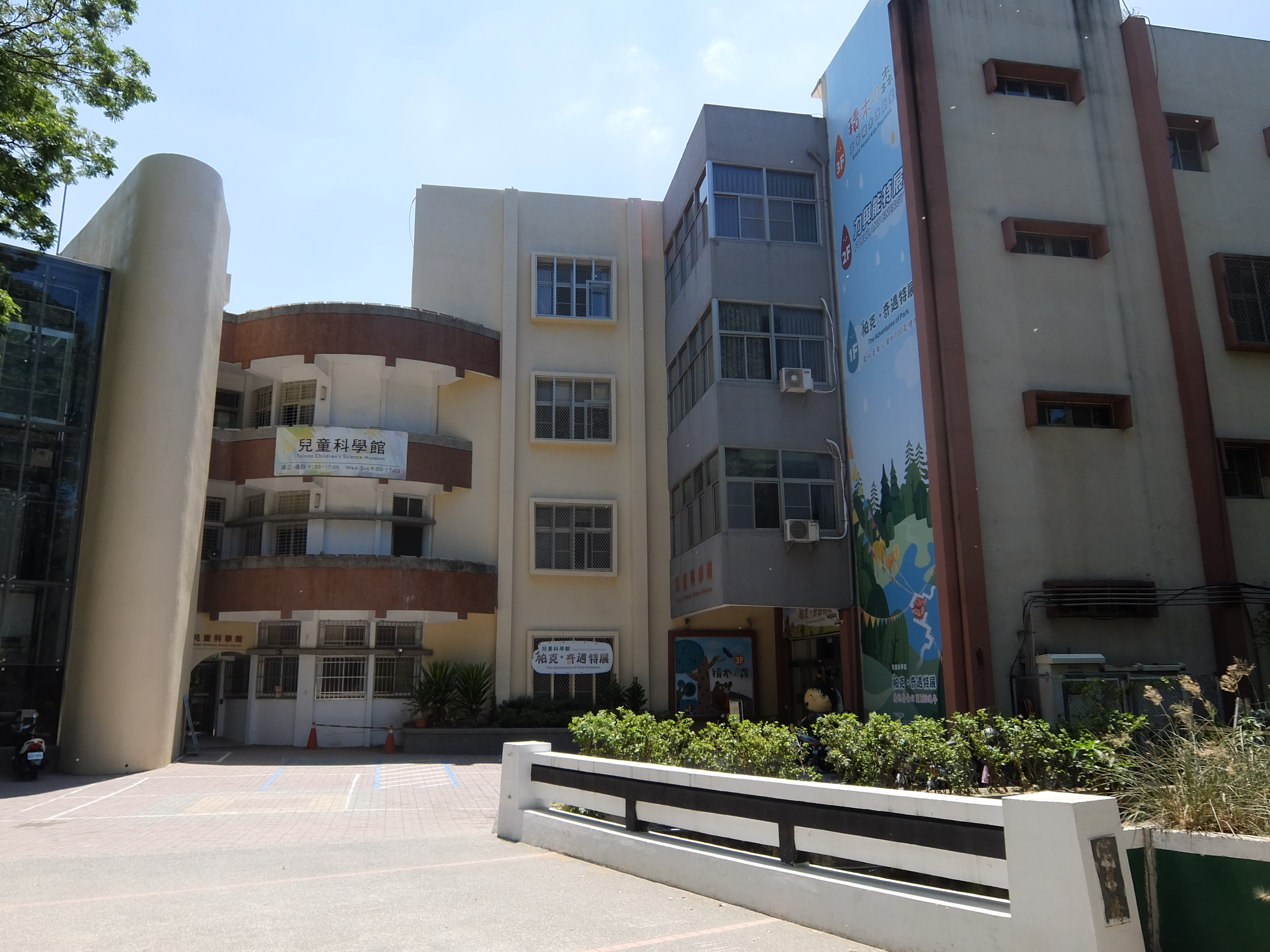
- Established: 1978
- Dissolved: 1 October 2025
- Location: North, Tainan, Taiwan
- Coordinates: 23°00′13″N 120°12′41″E
- Type: museum
- Public transit access: Tainan Station
- Website: Official website

The Tainan Children's Science Museum (TCSM; traditional Chinese: 台南市兒童科學館; simplified Chinese: 台南市儿童科学馆; pinyin: Táinán Shì Értóng Kēxuéguǎn) is a museum in North District, Tainan, Taiwan.

== History ==
The museum was established in 1978. The museum closed down on 1 October 2025.

== Architecture ==
The museum is housed in a four-story building, which houses the audiovisual room, administration center, exhibition rooms, reading room, kids playroom and classrooms.

== Transportation ==
The museum is accessible within walking distance north of Tainan Station of Taiwan Railway.

== See also ==
- List of museums in Taiwan
