= Tainan Cultural and Creative Park =

- 臺南文化創意產業園區
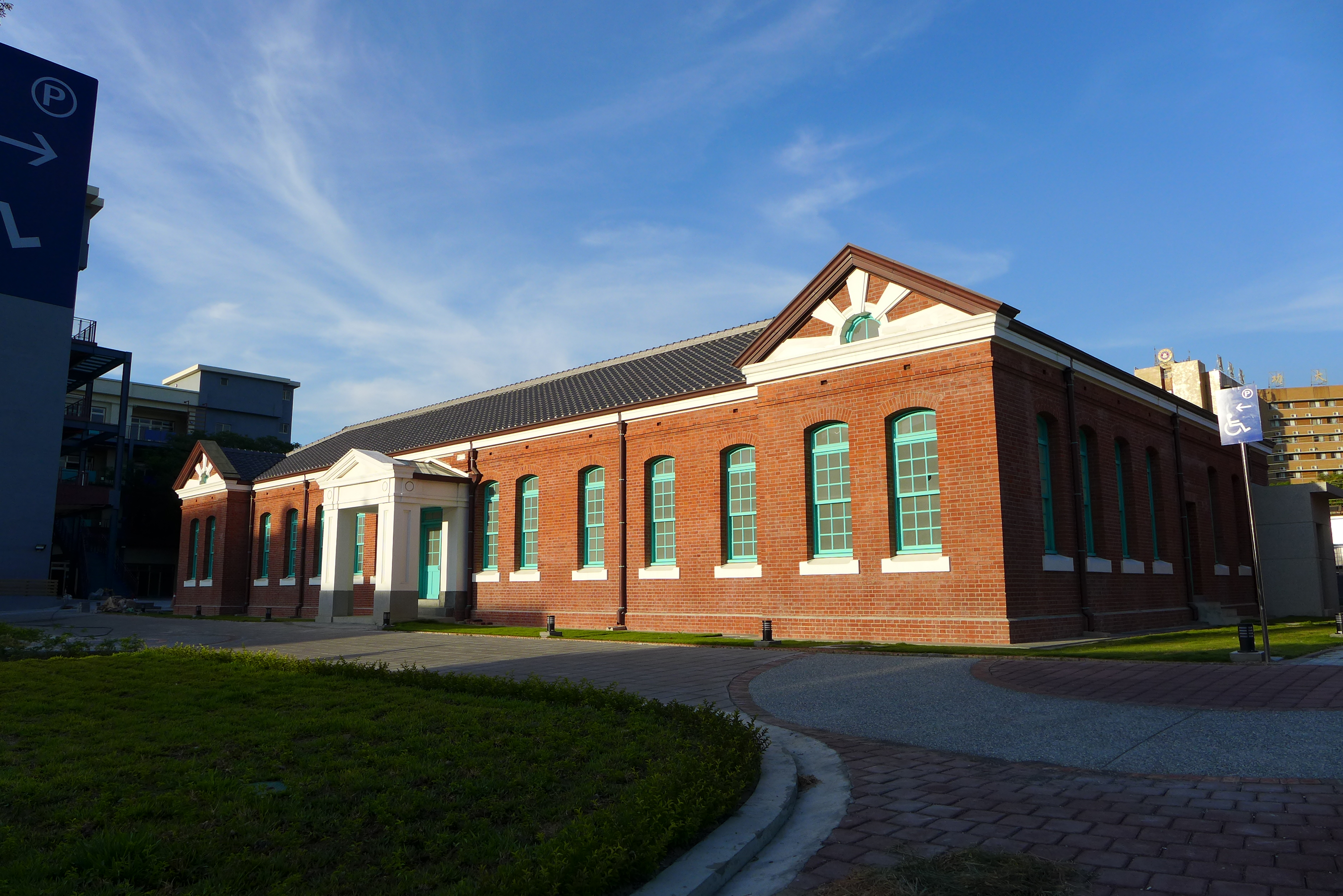
- Interactive map of the Tainan Cultural and Creative Park area

General information
- Type: Cultural and creative park
- Location: North, Tainan, Taiwan
- Coordinates: 22°59′56.5″N 120°12′46″E
- Opened: 17 July 2011

Website
- www.b16tainan.com.tw (in Chinese)

The Tainan Cultural and Creative Industries Park (Chinese: 臺南文化創意產業園區; pinyin: Táinán Wénhuà Chuàngyì Chǎnyè Yuánqū) is a multi-purpose park in North District, Tainan, Taiwan.

== History ==
The main red brick building of the park was built in the 1900s as the Monopoly Bureau branch of the Taiwan Governor's Office during the Japanese rule. The park was opened on 17 July 2011.

== Architecture ==
The park consists of a red brick building, a former warehouse and a dormitory of the Taiwan Railways Administration.

== Transportation ==
The park within walking distance from the Tainan Station of Taiwan Railway.

== See also ==
- List of tourist attractions in Taiwan
