= Tainan railway station =

Railway station in Tainan, Taiwan

Tainan 臺南
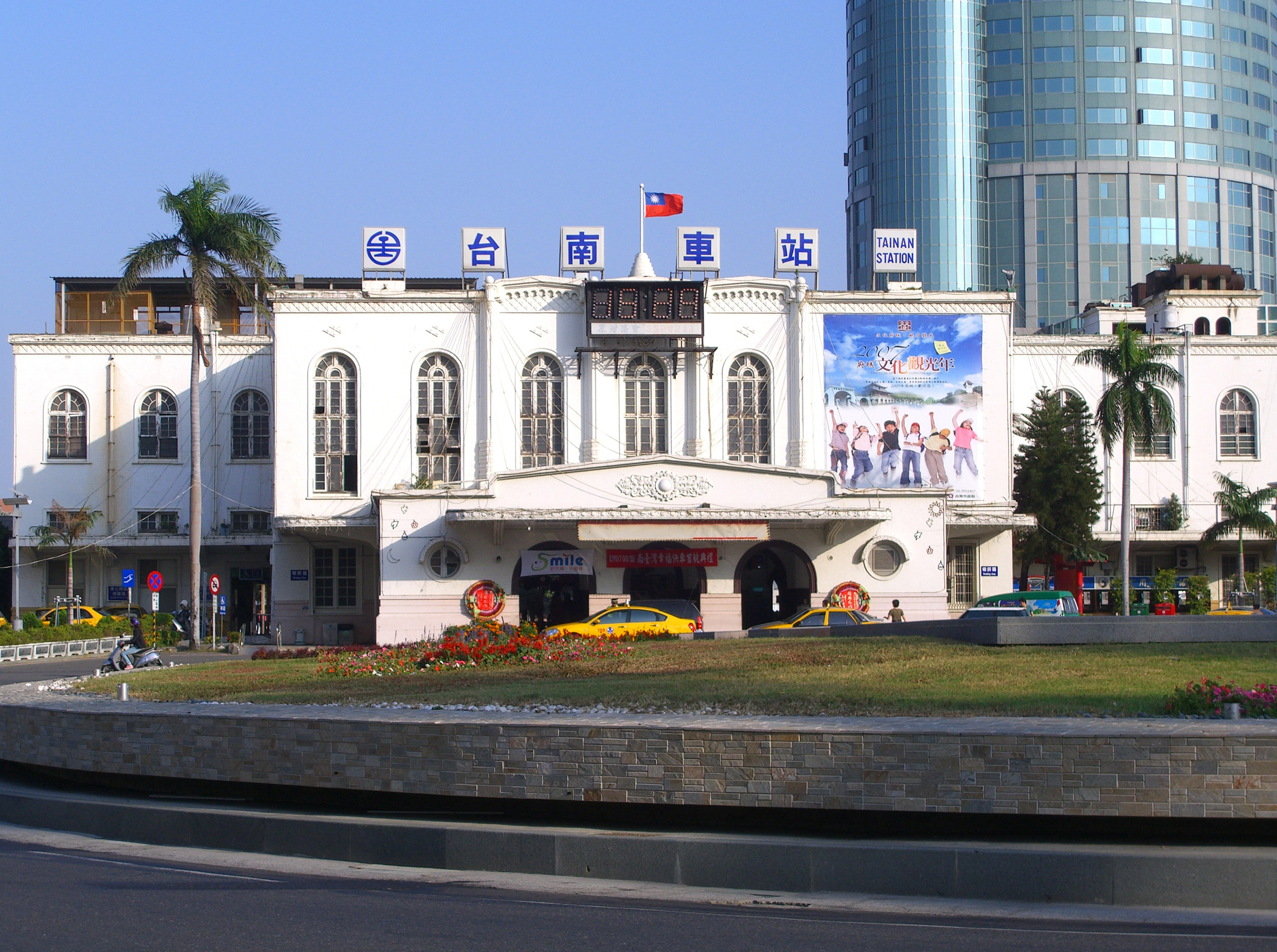

Chinese name
- Traditional Chinese: 台南
Transcriptions
Standard Mandarin
- Hanyu Pinyin: Táinán
- Bopomofo: ㄊㄞˊ ㄋㄢˊ
Hakka
- Romanization: Tǒi-nǎm (Sixian dialect); Toi-nam (Hailu dialect)
Southern Min
- Tâi-lô: Tâi-lâm

General information
- Location: 4 Sec 2 Beimen Rd; East District, Tainan; Taiwan
- Coordinates: 22.9971°N 120.2130°E
- System: TRA railway station
- Line: Western Trunk line
- Distance: 353.2 km to Keelung via Taichung
- Connections: Local bus; Coach

Construction
- Structure type: Underground

Other information
- Station code: 175 (three-digit); 1228 (four-digit); A77 (statistical)
- Classification: First class (Chinese: 一等)
- Website: www.railway.gov.tw/Tainan/index.aspx (in Chinese)

History
- Opened: 29 November 1900
- Rebuilt: 1936, ongoing (est 2031)
- Electrified: 23 April 1979

Key dates
- 17 October 2026: Services moved to underground tracks

Passengers
- 2017: 19.670 million per year ▲1.69%
- Rank: 4 out of 228

Services
Preceding station	Taiwan Railway	Following station
Daqiao towards Keelung	Western Trunk line	Bao'an towards Pingtung
Location
- Location within Taiwan

Tainan (Chinese: 台南; pinyin: Táinán) is a railway station in Tainan, Taiwan served by Taiwan Railway. Situated in the centre of the old town square in the East District of Tainan, this is the main station of the city and also one of the major stations along the western trunk line in Taiwan. The Shalun line, opened in 2011, allows through services to link the station with THSR Tainan station.

== Overview ==
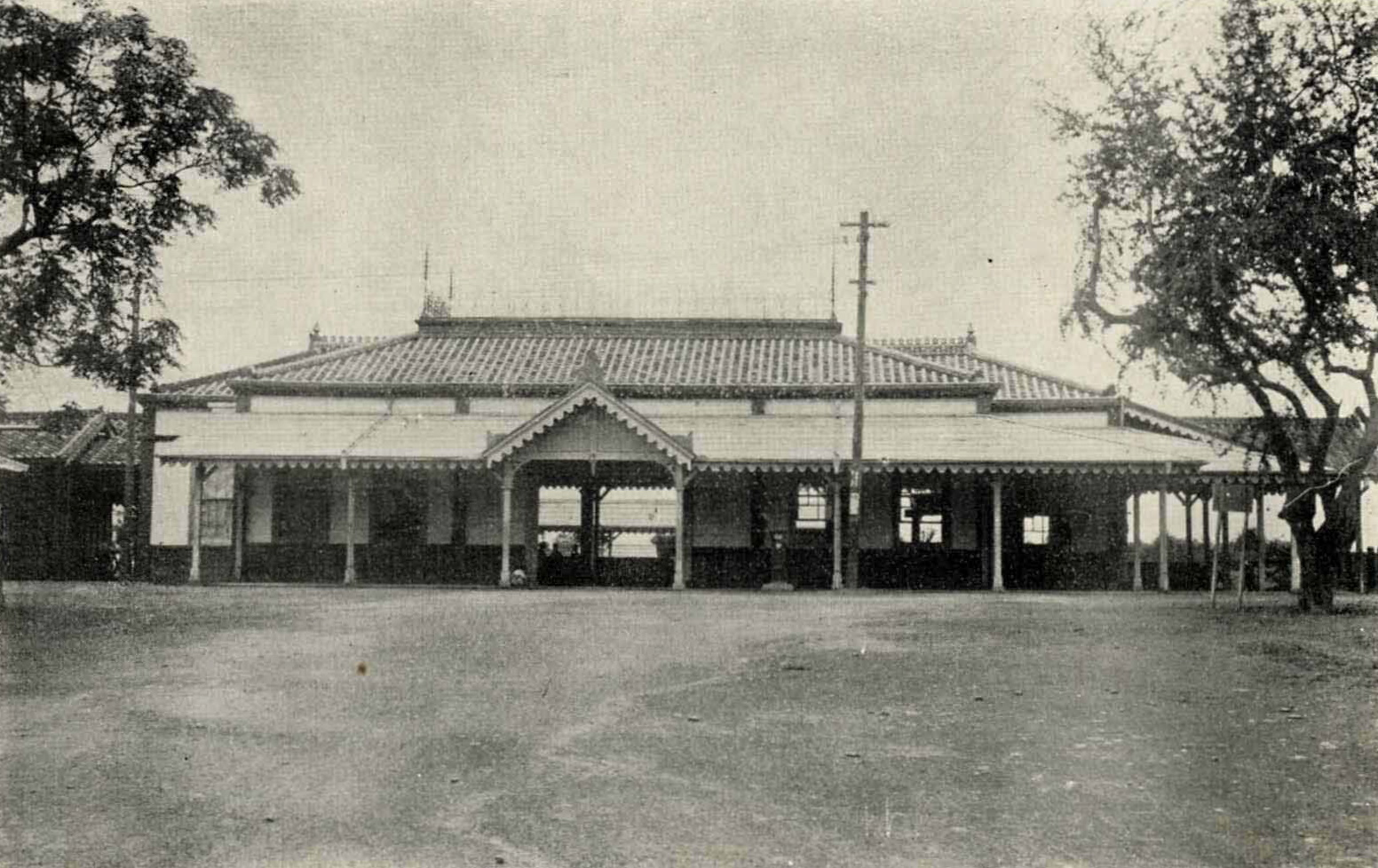
Tainan station when it first opened in 1900

The station first opened on 29 November 1900 and was partially rebuilt in 1905. A fully rebuilt station operated from 15 March 1936 to 2026, which featured a hotel on the second floor (the only station of its kind in Taiwan) until 1965 and a restaurant until 1986.

On 17 October 2026, services were moved to underground tracks. The new station has been under construction since 2019 is expected to be fully completed by March 2031.

== History ==
- 1899-12: The construction on the station began.
- 1900-05-15: Construction on the station was completed.
- 1900-11-29: The section from Tainan to Dagou (modern-day Kaohsiung Port) opened for service.
- 1901: The section from Tainan to Wanli (Shanhua) opened for service.
- 1905: Slight expansion of the station.
- 1911: Rebuilt due to collapse from wind and rain.
- 1927: Due to double track construction from Tainan to Kaohsiung and inadequacy of the station, the station was demolished. Construction began on the second-generation station the same year.
- 1936-03-15: The current (second-generation) station was completed, taking a total of two years and seven months to complete. A hotel was opened on the second floor of the station.
- 1945: The station sustained damage from an American bombing. A restaurant was added on the second floor.
- 1954-06-06: The Taiwan Sugar Railways Guanmiao line (關廟線) was extended to the south of Tainan Station.
- 1965: The hotel on the second floor of the station was closed.
- 1969-05-20: The Guanmiao line was demolished.
- 1977-06: A station rear entrance/exit was constructed to benefit East District residents and the students and teachers of nearby schools who otherwise would have to go through the main entrance/exit on Beimen Road.
- 1986: The restaurant on the second floor of the station was closed.
- 1998-12-18: The Ministry of the Interior designated the station a historical site. (The government of Taiwan Province had previously declared it a historical site.)
- 1999-07-01: Station operation was transferred from the provincial railway bureau to the Ministry of Transportation and Communications.
- 2007-04-26: The Tainan Urban District Railway Underground Project (臺南市區鐵路地下化計畫) was finalized. This plan moved the station as well as the railroad tracks from around Shijian Park (實踐公園) to the southern end of Shengchan Road (生產路) completely underground. The original station aboveground would be preserved as a landmark and some of the original railroad tracks area converted into a park.
- 2009-09-09: The Executive Yuan Council for Economic Planning and Development approved the Tainan Urban District Railway Underground Project. Construction was expected to begin and last for over seven years, to be completed by 2017.
- 2010-12-21: Two additional barrier-free elevators at the front station were put into operation (located respectively in the taxi scheduling area and by the Tainan Branch of the Ministry of Economic Affairs Bureau of Standards, Metrology and Inspection)
- 2010-12-21: The Shalun Line began operation, allowing passengers to reach the Shalun Station and the connected Tainan HSR station in 20 minutes.
- 2012-05-08: A barrier-free elevator connecting Platform 1 and 2 was completed and put into operation.
- 2016-04-21: Puyuma Express trains began to stop at Tainan Station.
- 2017-05-07: The collapse of the lobby ceiling injured two passengers, prompting an investigation into the structural integrity of the historical site.
- 2017-10: Renovations began, costing a total of NT$157 million and an estimated construction period of 40 months.
- 2019-11: Construction on the new underground station began.
- 2026-10: Underground station began operation.

== Platform layout ==
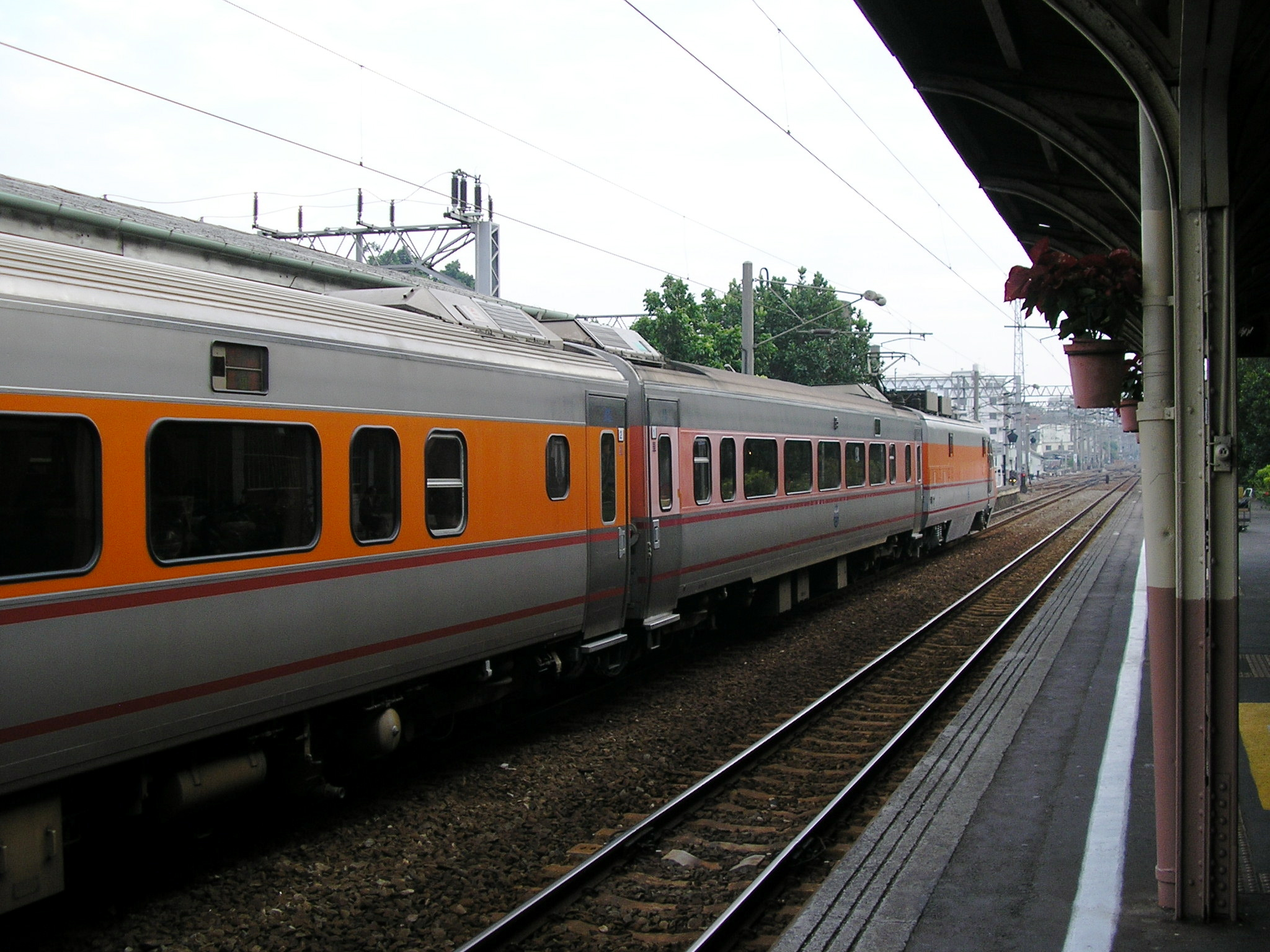
A Tzu-Chiang train at Tainan station

=== Above ground era ===
1	1	■ West Coast line (northbound)	Towards Chiayi, Changhua, Taichung, Taipei
1	1	■ Eastern line (southbound cross-line)	Towards Yilan, Su-ao, Hualien
2	2A	■ West Coast line (southbound)	Towards Kaohsiung, Pingtung
2	2A	■ South-link line (southbound)	Towards Fangliao, Taitung
3	2B	■ West Coast line (southbound departure, through traffic)	Towards Kaohsiung, Pingtung
3	2B	■ West Coast line (northbound departure, through traffic)	Towards Chiayi, Changhua, Taichung, Taipei

=== Underground era ===
1	2B	■ West Coast line (northbound through traffic)	Towards Chiayi, Changhua, Taichung, Taipei
2	2A	■ West Coast line (northbound)	Towards Chiayi, Changhua, Taichung, Taipei
3	1B	■ West Coast line (southbound)	Towards Kaohsiung, Pingtung, Chaozhou and Shalun
4	1A	■ West Coast line (southbound departure, through traffic)	Towards Kaohsiung, Pingtung, Chaozhou and Shalun

== Around the station ==
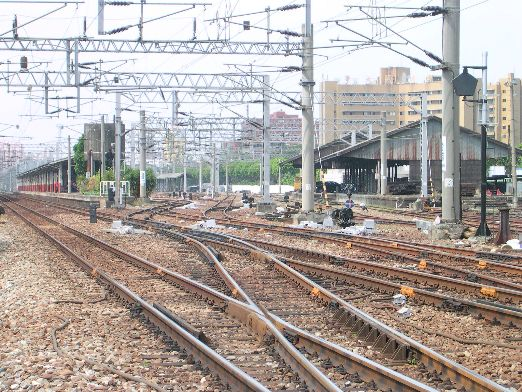
Railway tracks leading into the station

=== Station front ===
- Department of Health Tainan Hospital
- China Daily News Headquarters
- Shin Kong Mitsukoshi Department Store (Tainan Zhongshan Store)
- Focus Department Store
- North Gate Shopping Circle
- Taiwan High Court, Tainan Branch
- Bo Yang Museum
- Former Tainan Weather Observatory
- Hayashi Department Store
- National Tainan Junior College of Nursing
- National Tainan Second Senior High School
- Tainan Children's Science Museum
- Tainan Cultural and Creative Park
- Tainan Judicial Museum
- Tang Te-chang Memorial Park
- Yeh Shih-tao Literature Memorial Hall

=== Station back ===
- National Cheng Kung University
- National University of Tainan
- National Cheng Kung University Hospital
- National Tainan First Senior High School
- Far Eastern Department Store
- Shangri-La's Far Eastern Plaza Hotel

== See also ==
- List of railway stations in Taiwan
