= Tainan Judicial Museum =

Museum in West Central, Tainan, Taiwan

- 臺南司法博物館
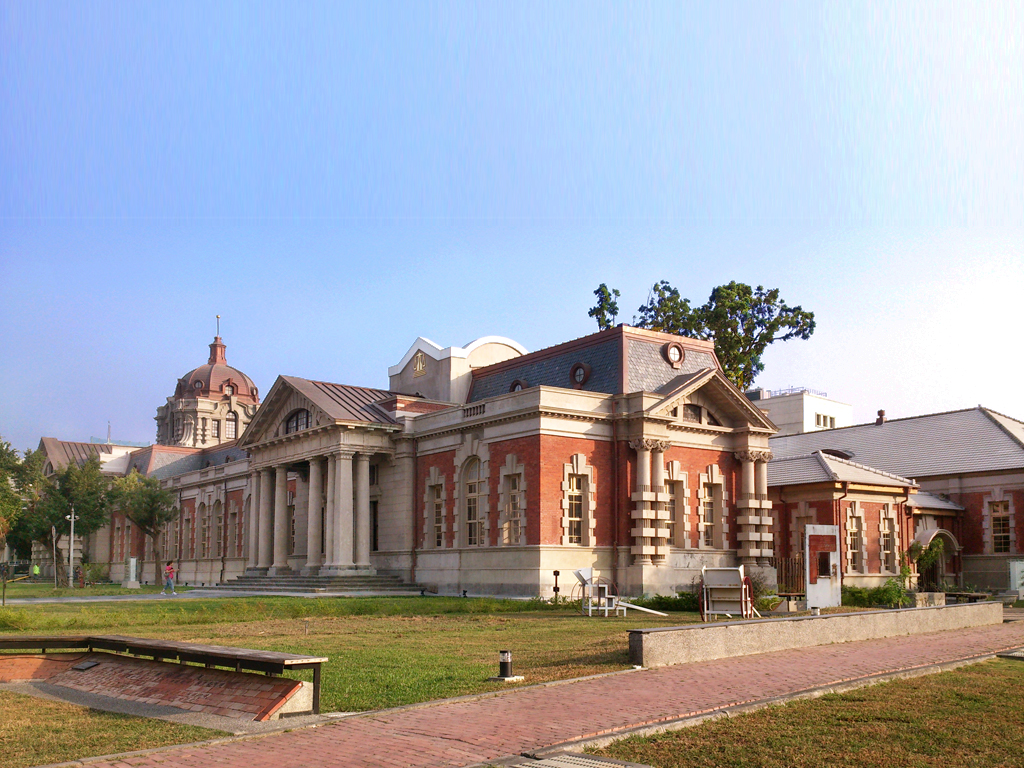
- Former name: Tainan District Court
- Established: 8 November 2016
- Location: West Central, Tainan, Taiwan
- Coordinates: 22°59′21.3″N 120°12′3.3″E
- Type: museum
- Founder: Governor-General of Taiwan
- Architect: Matsunosuke Moriyama
- Public transit access: Tainan Station

The Tainan Judicial Museum (traditional Chinese: 臺南司法博物館; simplified Chinese: 台南司法博物馆; pinyin: Táinán Sīfǎ Bówùguǎn) or Old Tainan District Court (Chinese: 原臺南地方法院; pinyin: Yuán Táinán Dìfāng Fǎyuàn) is a museum in West Central District, Tainan, Taiwan.

== History ==
The museum building was originally constructed as a courthouse in 1914 during the Japanese rule of Taiwan under the direct jurisdiction of the Governor-General of Taiwan. After the handover of Taiwan from Japan to the Republic of China in 1945, the building underwent several renovations. The western part of the building later on collapsed and was demolished in 1969. In 1991 after the National Historical Monument Conference, the building was designated as a second class historical monument by the Ministry of the Interior. In 2003, the building underwent renovation work. It was then completed on 8 November 2016 in a ceremony attended by Judicial Yuan President Hsu Tzong-li.

== Architecture ==
The original court building was designed by Japanese architect Matsunosuke Moriyama in a Baroque architecture style. It has gable-style asymmetrical porch. Its facade consists of 8 portions, in which each has its own oeil-de-boeuf window.

== Exhibition ==
The museum exhibits the history of the building, law-related writings, local history of the district, historical documents on law, displays regarding the architect, an exhibition on the restoration works, and photographs.

== Transportation ==
The museum is accessible within walking distance southwest of Tainan Station of Taiwan Railway.

== Gallery ==
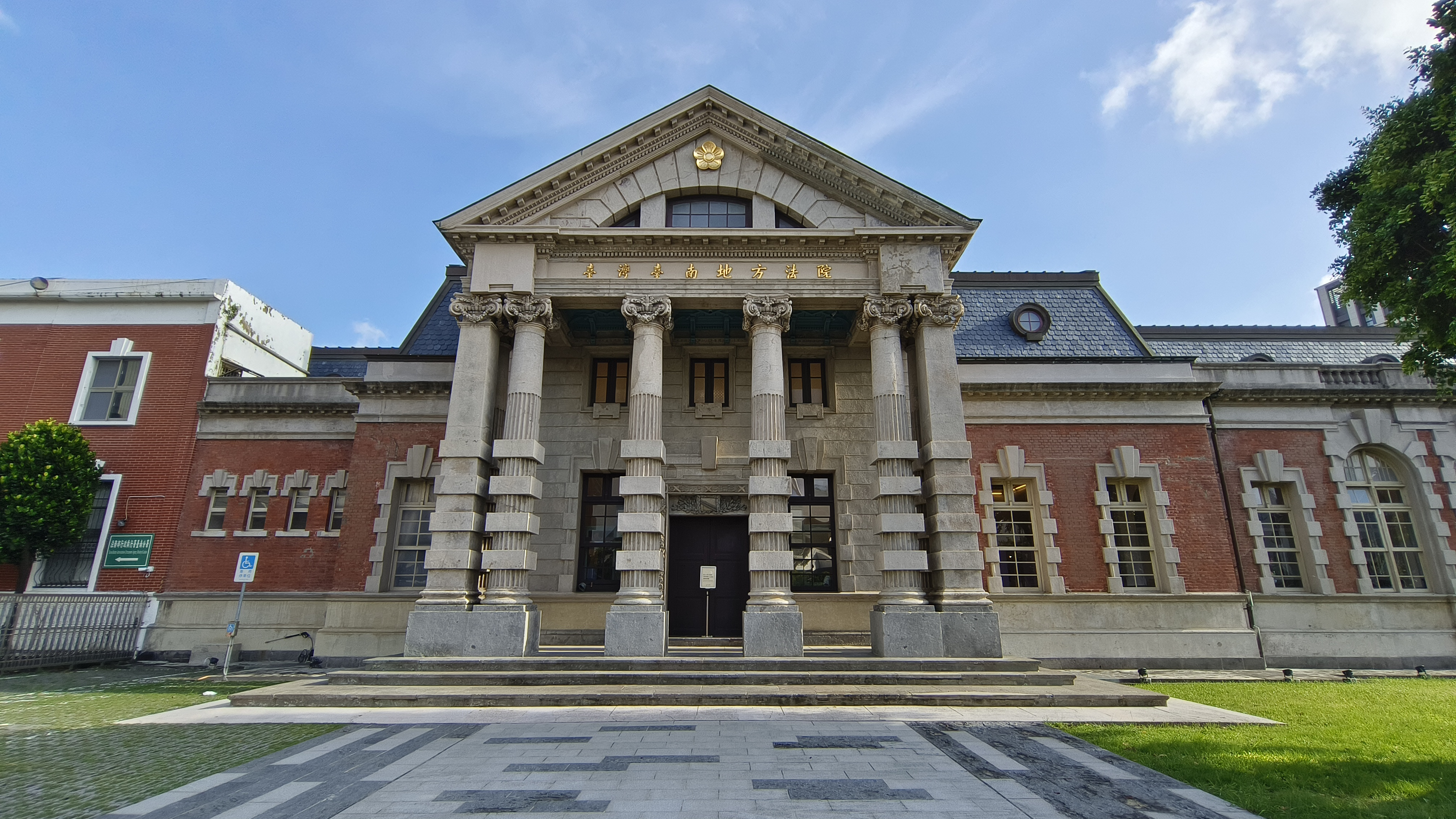
Main entrance

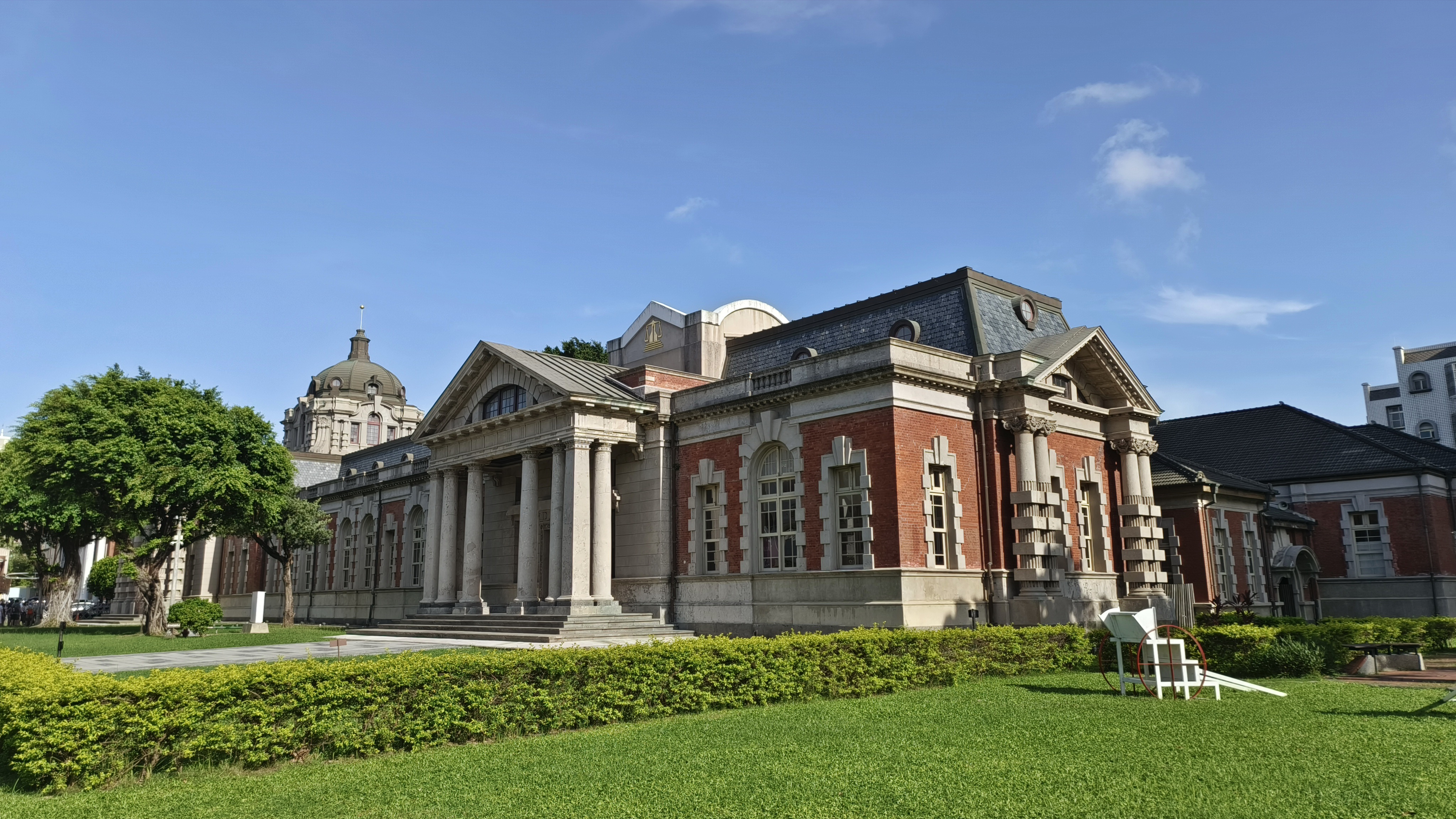

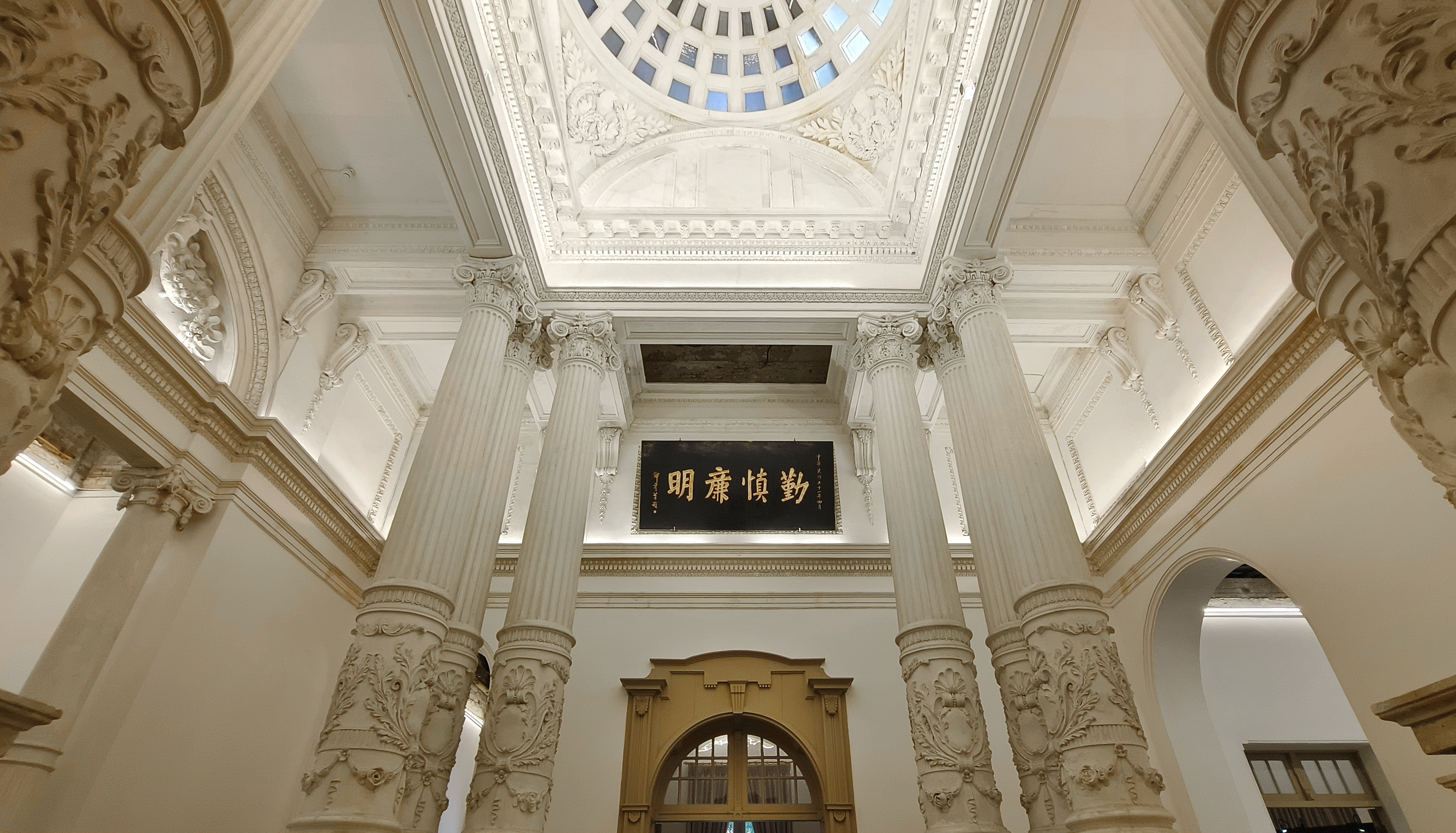
Main Hall

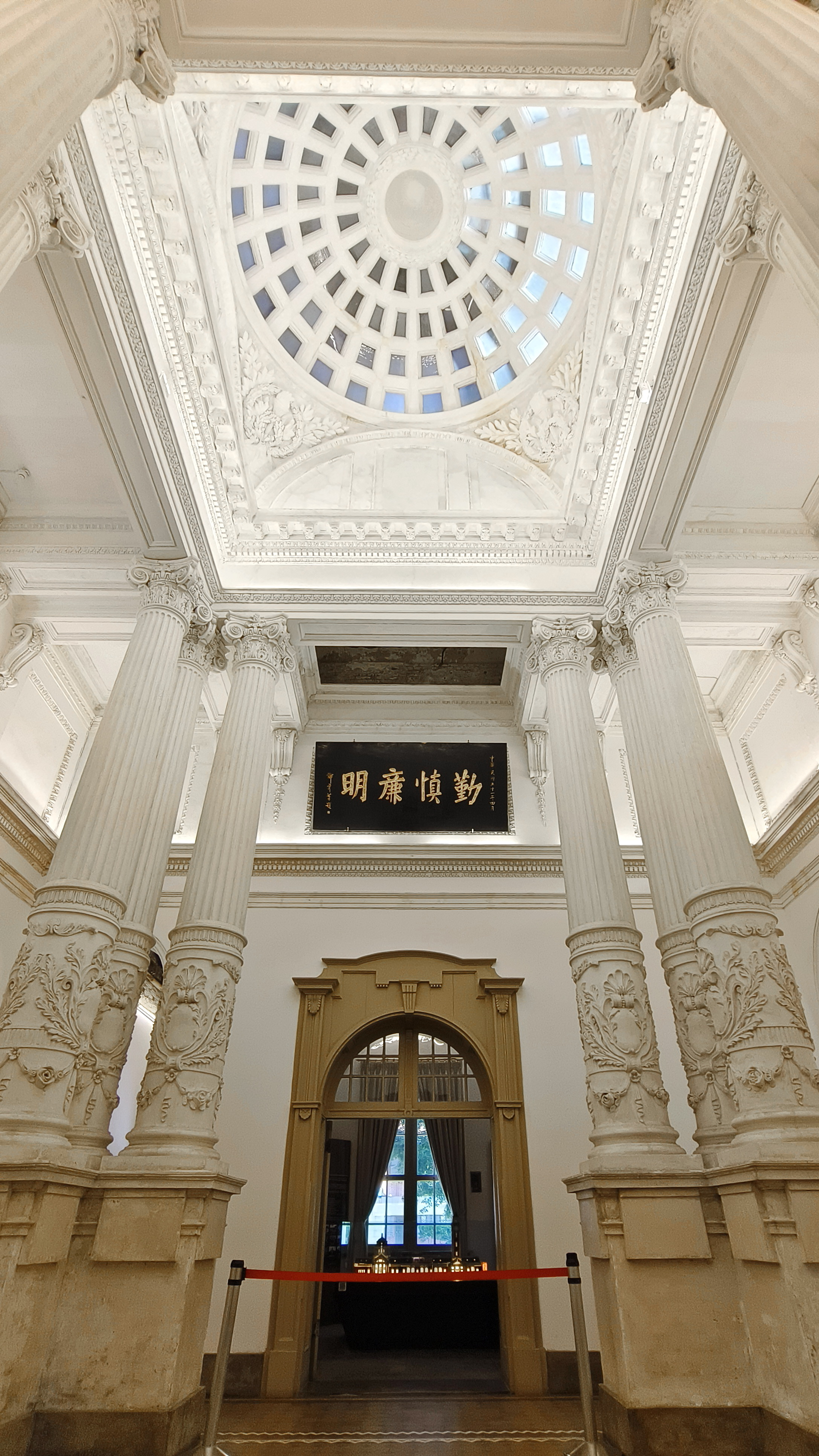
Main Hall

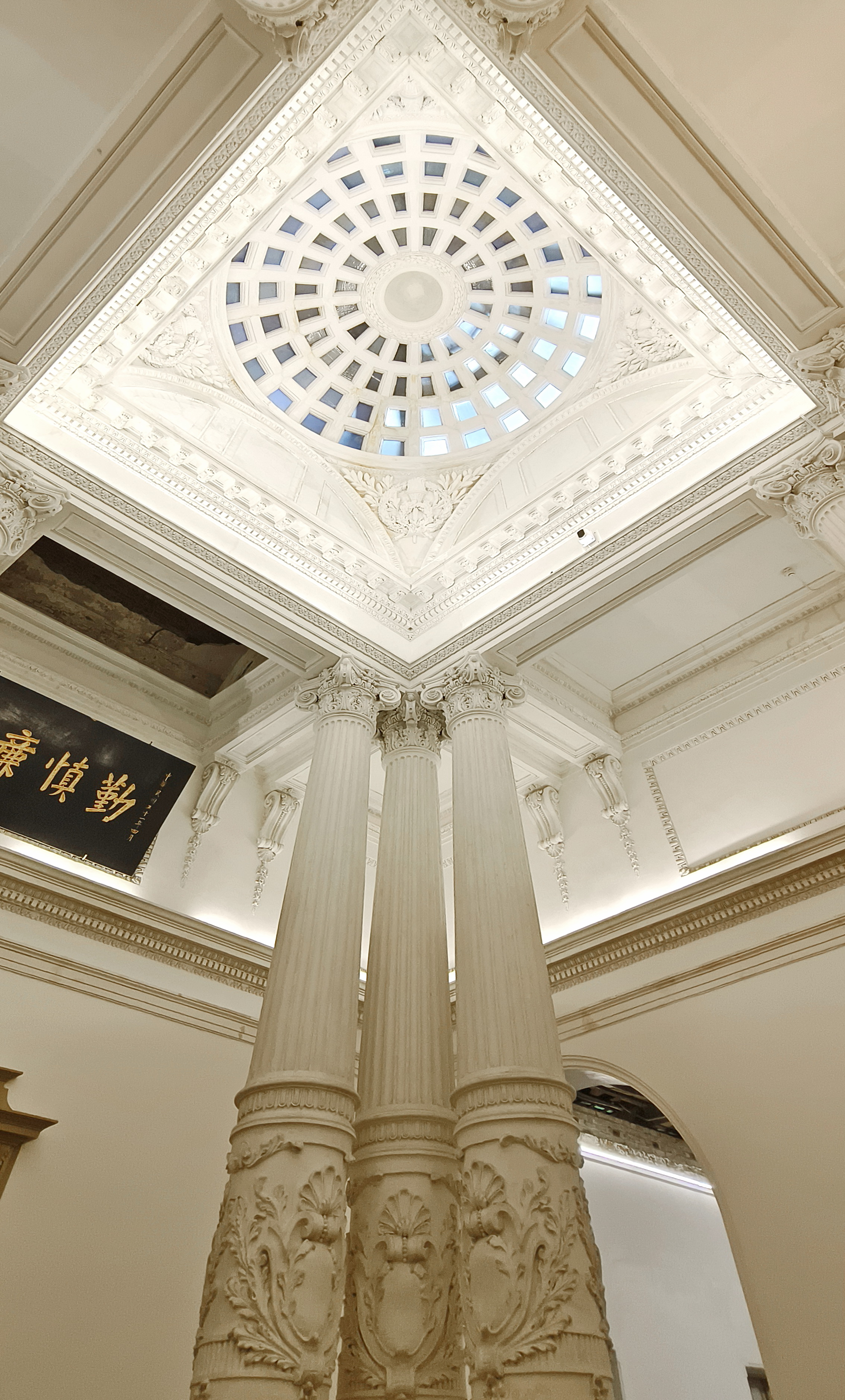
Coffered openwork dome

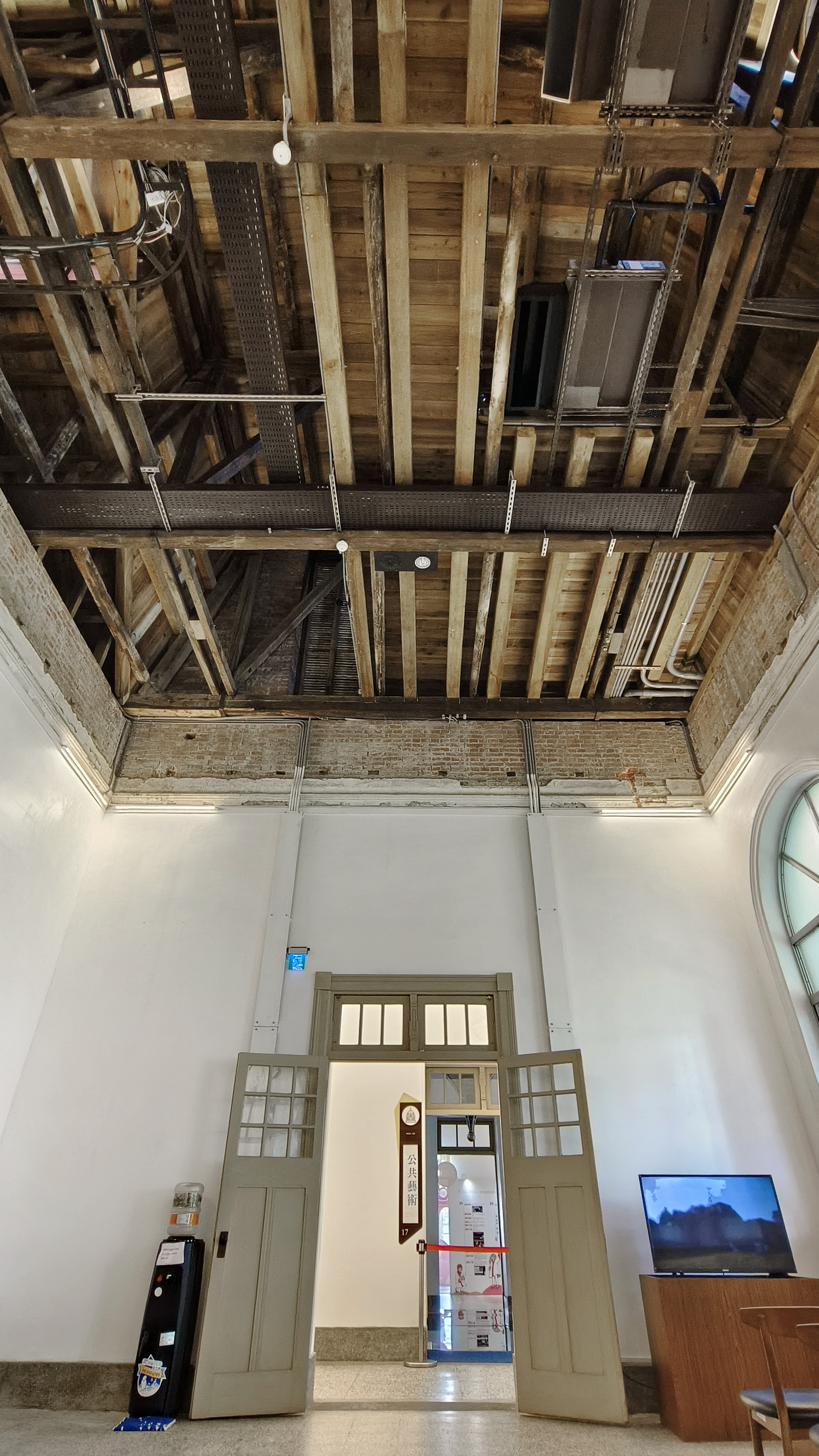
Catwalk inside the roof

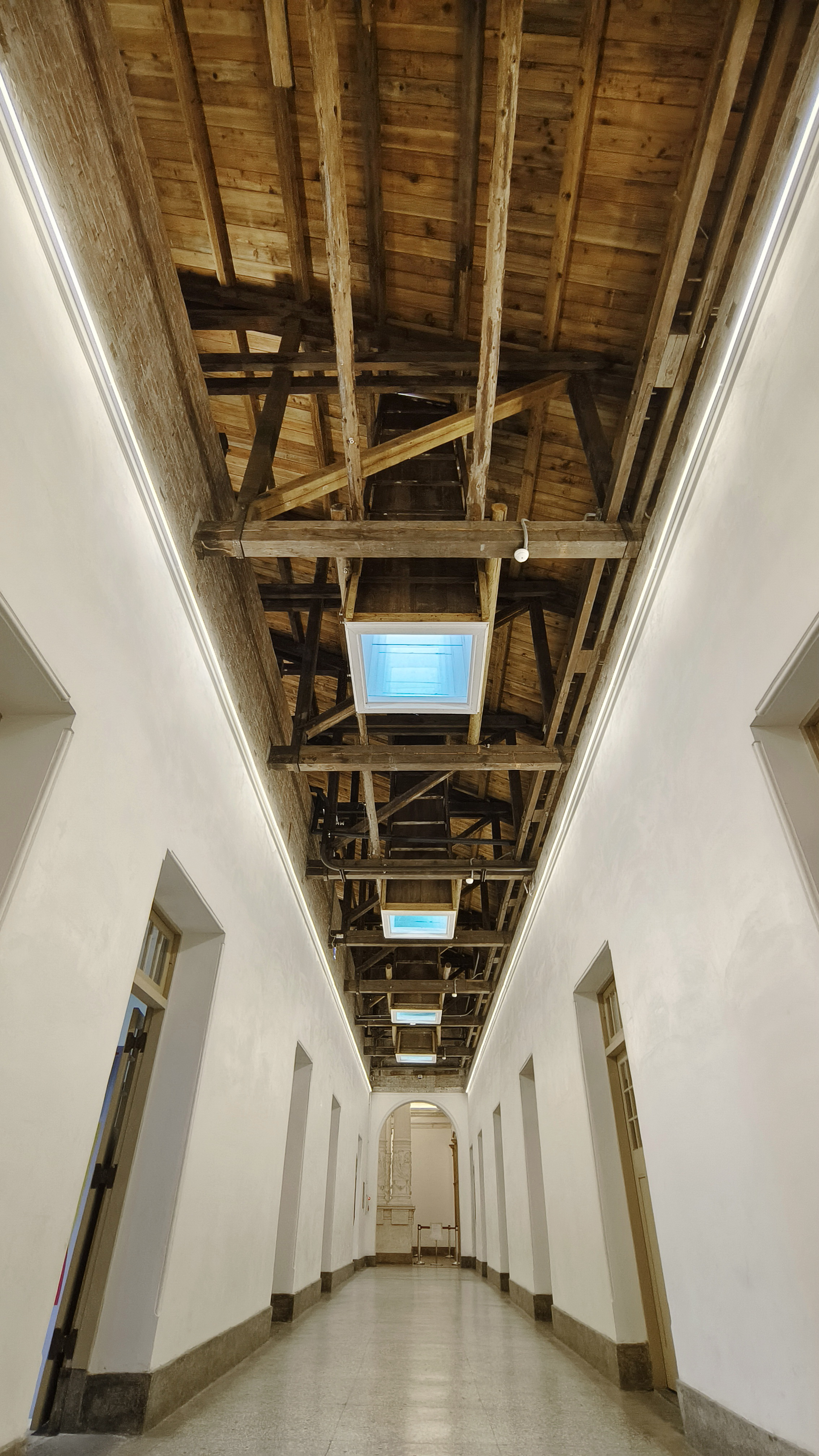

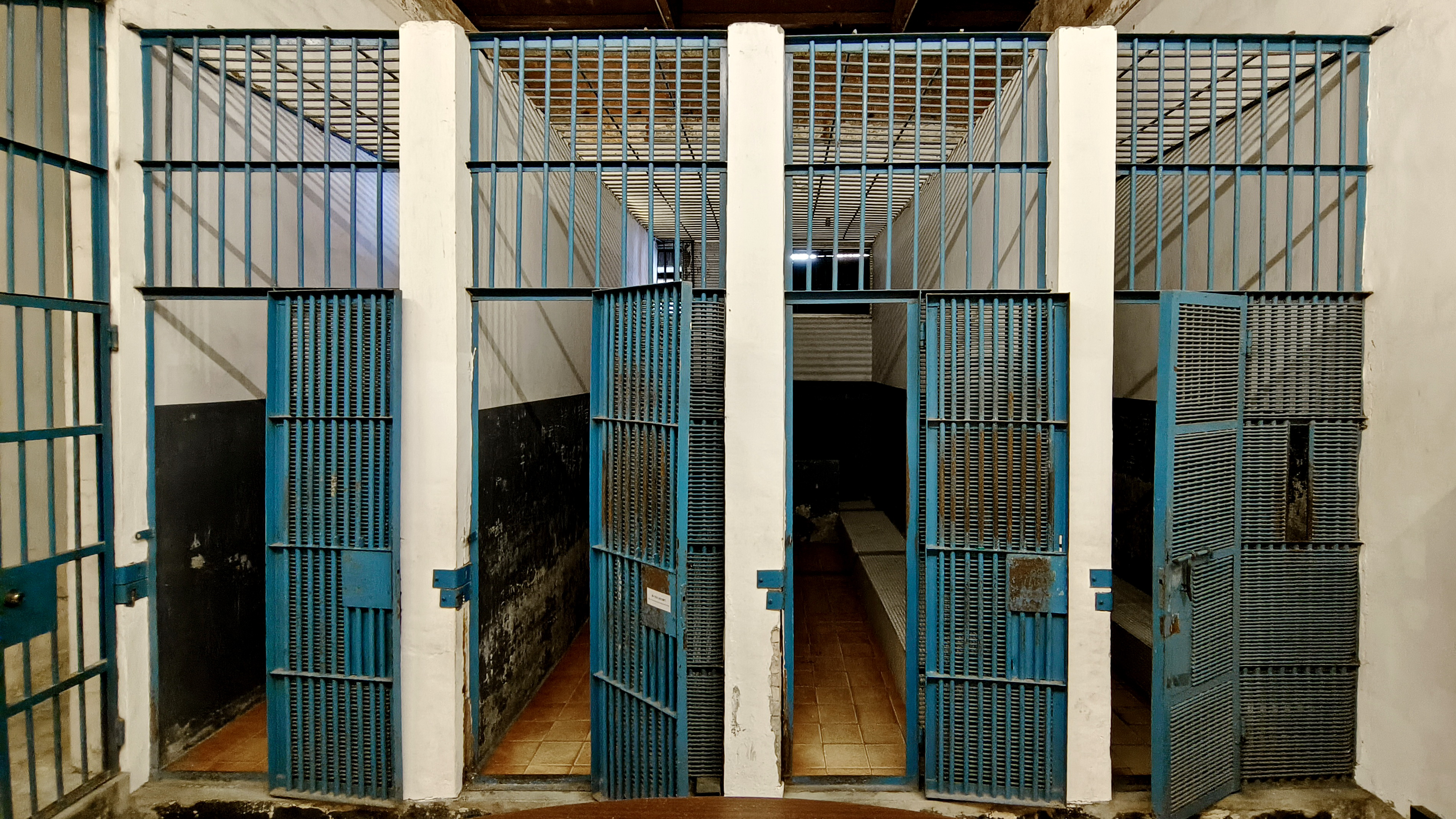
Detention room

== See also ==
- List of museums in Taiwan
