= Tainan Flower Night Market =

Night market in North, Tainan, Taiwan

Tainan Flower Night Market 花園夜市
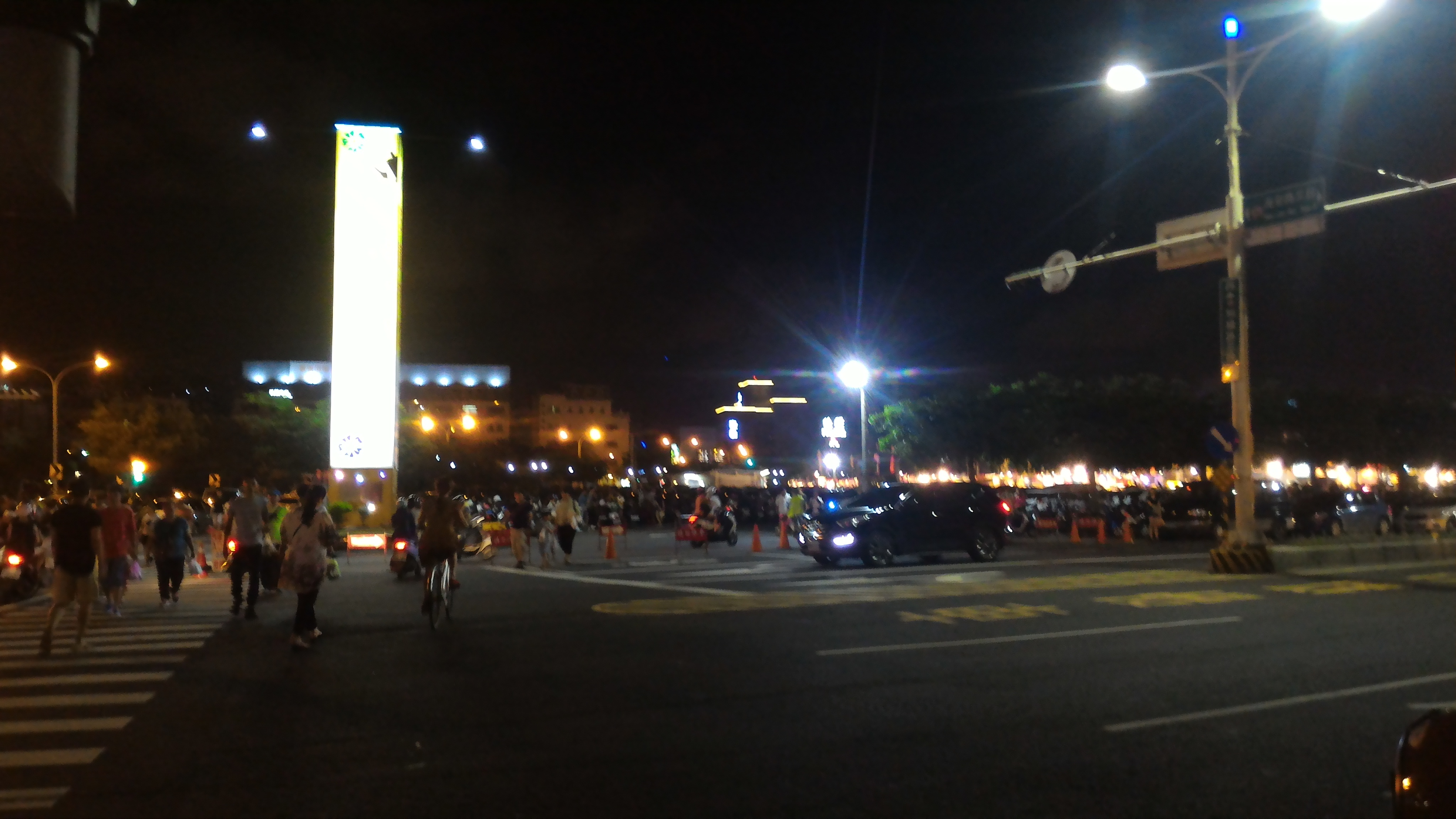
- Location: North, Tainan, Taiwan; 23°00′37.6″N 120°11′58.5″E
- Opening date: 1999
- Environment: Night market
- Days normally open: 3
- Interactive map of Tainan Flower Night Market

The Tainan Flower Night Market (Chinese: 花園夜市; pinyin: Huāyuán Yè Shì; lit. 'Garden Night Market') is a tourism night market in North District, Tainan, Taiwan. It is often considered to be the largest and most famous night market in the city. It is said that "South is Flower, Middle is Fengjia, North is Shihlin".

== History ==
map

The night market was formally established in 1999. It is one of the youngest night markets in the city.

== Overview ==
The Flower Night Market is open three days a week - on Thursday, Saturday and Sunday, from 5PM until midnight. It is closed on rainy days. Many kinds of foods and items are sold here, such as fried chicken, oyster omelets, beef rolls, scallion pancakes, takoyaki, eel noodles, bubble milk tea, clothes, dolls, mobile phone cases, lighters, and many others. Arcade games such as basketball machines, ring tossing, and balloon shooting can be seen here.

== Most famous foods ==
- Bubble tea
- Candied guava (醃芭樂)
- Grilled chicken steak (烤雞排)
- Oyster omelette
- Spicy duck blood (麻辣鴨血)
- Spring roll ice cream (春捲冰淇淋)
- Stinky tofu
- Winter melon drink (冬瓜茶)

== See also ==
- Night markets in Taiwan
- List of night markets in Taiwan
