= Sheng Kung Girls' High School =

Private girls' senior high school in Tainan, Taiwan

The Sheng Kung Girls' High School (Chinese: 聖功女子高級中學) is an all-girl junior and senior high school located in North District, Tainan, Taiwan. It was founded in Tienjin, China, by the Catholic Sheng Kung Concent, and moved to its present location in 1964.

== Statistics ==
- Total students 2600 girls.
- Age range 11–18, (grades 7–11)
- Staff numbers 50 full-time, 10 part-time
- Principal Ms Julliana Jen

== History ==
It was founded as an elementary school in 1914 in the former French Protectorate of Tien Jing.

== See also ==
- Education in Taiwan
