= Yeh Shih-tao =

Taiwanese writer and historian

- 葉石濤
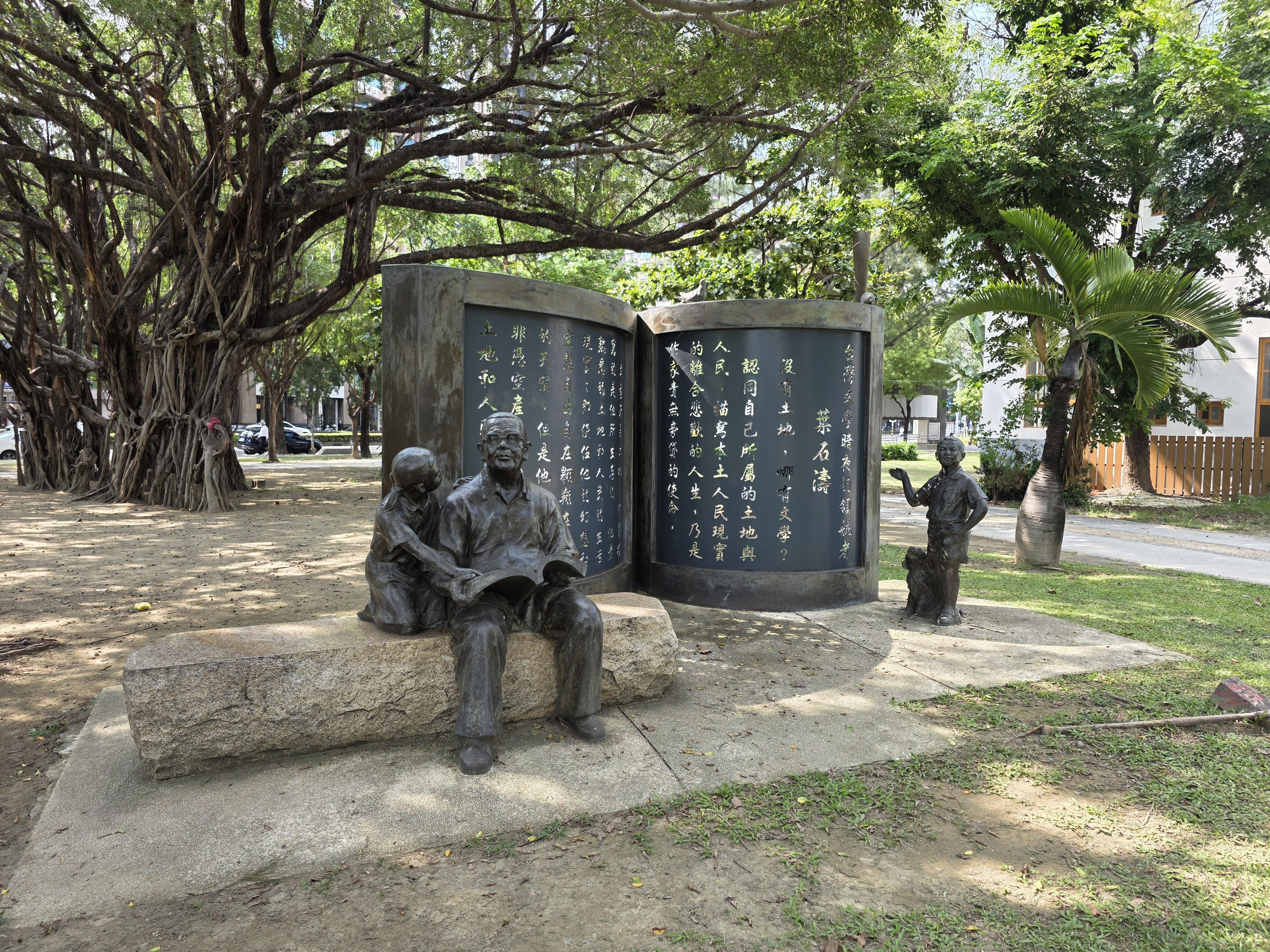
- Memorial of Yeh Shih-tao in Kaohsiung
- Born: 1925; Tainan, Japanese Taiwan
- Died: 11 December 2008 (aged 82–83); Kaohsiung, Taiwan
- Occupations: Writer, historian

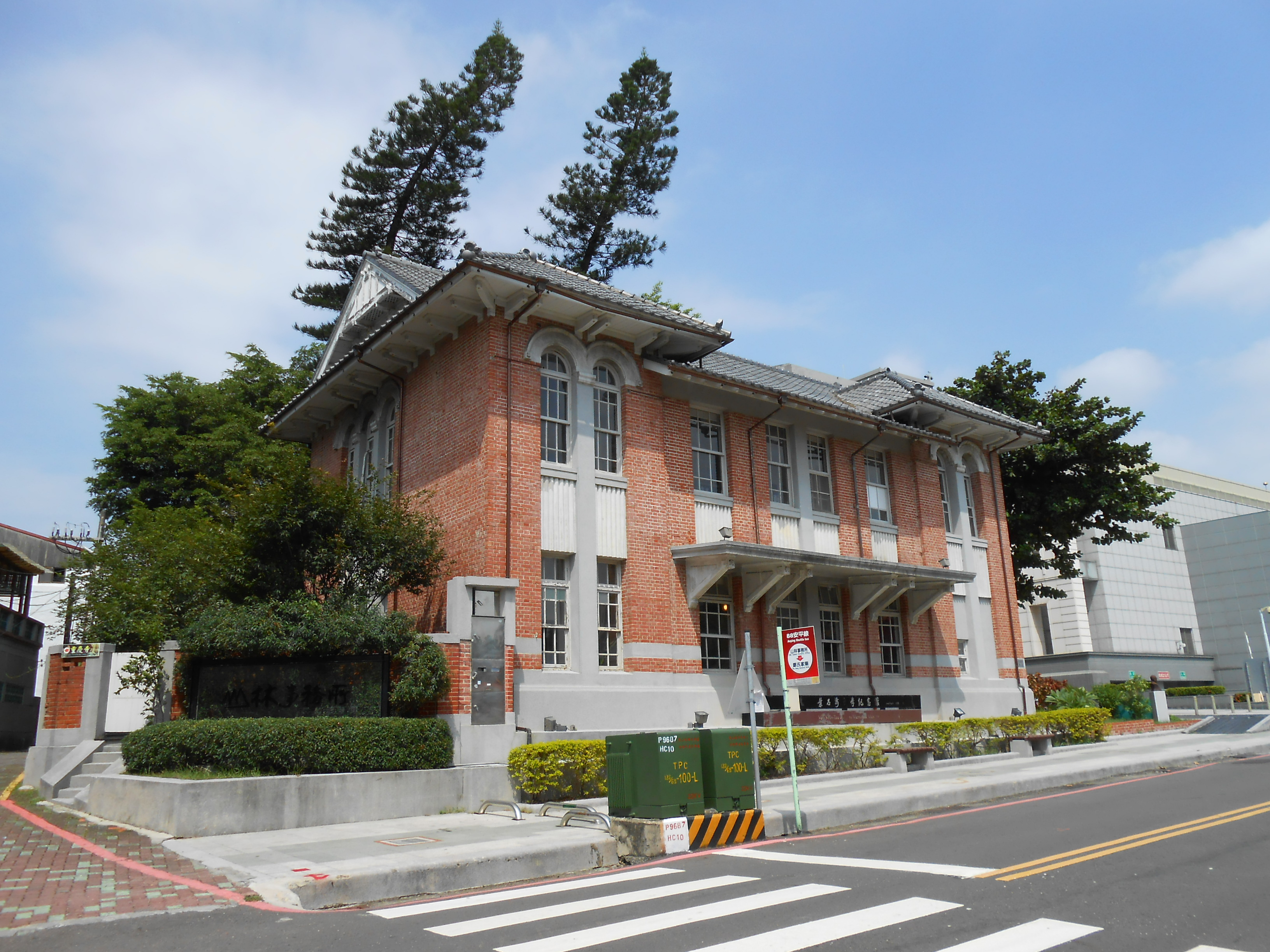
Yeh Shih-tao Literature Memorial Hall in Tainan

Yeh Shih-tao (Chinese: 葉石濤; pinyin: Yè Shítāo; Wade–Giles: Yeh Shih-t'ao; Pe̍h-ōe-jī: Ia̍p Se̍k-tô͘; 1925 – 11 December 2008) was a pioneering Taiwanese writer and historian spanning both the Japanese rule and post-war periods, who specialized in the literary history of Taiwan and the lives of ordinary Taiwanese people. His primary focus was on novels and critiques, supplemented by essays and translations, and was considered a seminal figure in Taiwanese literary criticism.

== Biography ==
Yeh Shih-tao was born in Tainan, Taiwan, in 1925 at a time when Taiwan was under Japanese rule. His early writings were in Japanese, but he switched to Chinese after the Nationalists under Chiang Kai-shek gained control of Taiwan following the end of World War II. He wrote three novels while attending high school, one of which, titled A Letter from Lin (林君來的信), was published in April 1943 as Yeh's debut work. He was arrested by the Chiang Kai-shek regime in 1951 and imprisoned for three years for allegedly harboring "communist agents." After his release from prison, Yeh became a schoolteacher. In 1965, Yen published Youth (青春), which he described as his first serious work since the war ended.

Yeh later served as an adviser of the Teacher Human Rights Advocate Committee in Kaohsiung, and was appointed a national policy adviser to the Chen Shui-bian government. Yeh Shih-tao died of intestinal cancer in Kaohsiung, on 11 December 2008, at the age of 83. He had been continuously hospitalized since February 2008. Yeh was survived by his wife and two sons.

== Career ==
Author of No Land, No Literature (沒有土地, 哪有文學), The Dilemmas of Taiwan Literature (臺灣文學的困境) and History of Taiwanese Literature (台灣文學史綱), he chronicled 300 years of the island's literary history and gained renown "for his searing portrayals of ordinary Taiwanese". His best known work was likely The Chronicle of Taiwanese Literature, a compilation of Taiwanese historical literature published in 1987.

Yeh Shih-tao's early literary influences came from the Japanese writer Mitsuru Nishikawa, and his works bore a romanticism tint. In 1945, with the Nationalist government taking control of Taiwan, Yeh began learning Chinese and started experimenting with Chinese-language writing. He was one of the earliest Taiwanese writers to overcome language barriers, contributing essays, critiques, and translations to newspapers. During the White Terror period in 1951, he was arrested by the Nationalist government for allegedly harboring “communist agents” and served three years in prison. After his release, he continued his career in education while engaging in literary creation and criticism. After being transferred to Kaohsiung in 1967, where he settled, he died in 2008. In 1987, Yeh Shih-tao completed A History of Taiwan Literature (臺灣文學史綱), actively participating in the construction of Taiwan's literary history.

Yeh Shih-tao believed in constructing a literary historical perspective for Taiwan based on the nativism consciousness in regional literature. In his review of Forty Years of the Taiwanese New Literary Movement, a work by Peng Jui-chin (彭瑞金), he emphasized that Taiwanese literature is part of world literature, not subordinate to any external ruling nationality. A similar statement has also been made about the relationship between Taiwan literature and world literature: “one of the main tasks of modern Taiwan literature to be undertaken is to…… build up a literature with both Taiwan’s unique features and visions eyeing at the world.” Even during the Japanese rule period, Taiwanese literature was not an extension of Japanese literature, and after World War II, Taiwanese literature did not belong to Chinese literature. Therefore, Yeh intentionally built Taiwanese nativist literature, constructing a view of Taiwanese literary history through the societal background, local environment, and the roots and changes in literary inheritance.

Yeh's works of fiction have been translated to a number of languages, among them English, Japanese, Korean, Malay, and Vietnamese. A documentary about the author, Yeh Shih-tao, A Taiwan Man, was released in 2022.

== See also ==
- List of Taiwanese authors
