= North District, Tainan =

District in Tainan, Taiwan

Coordinates: 23°00′39.2″N 120°12′23.5″E

North 北區
- District
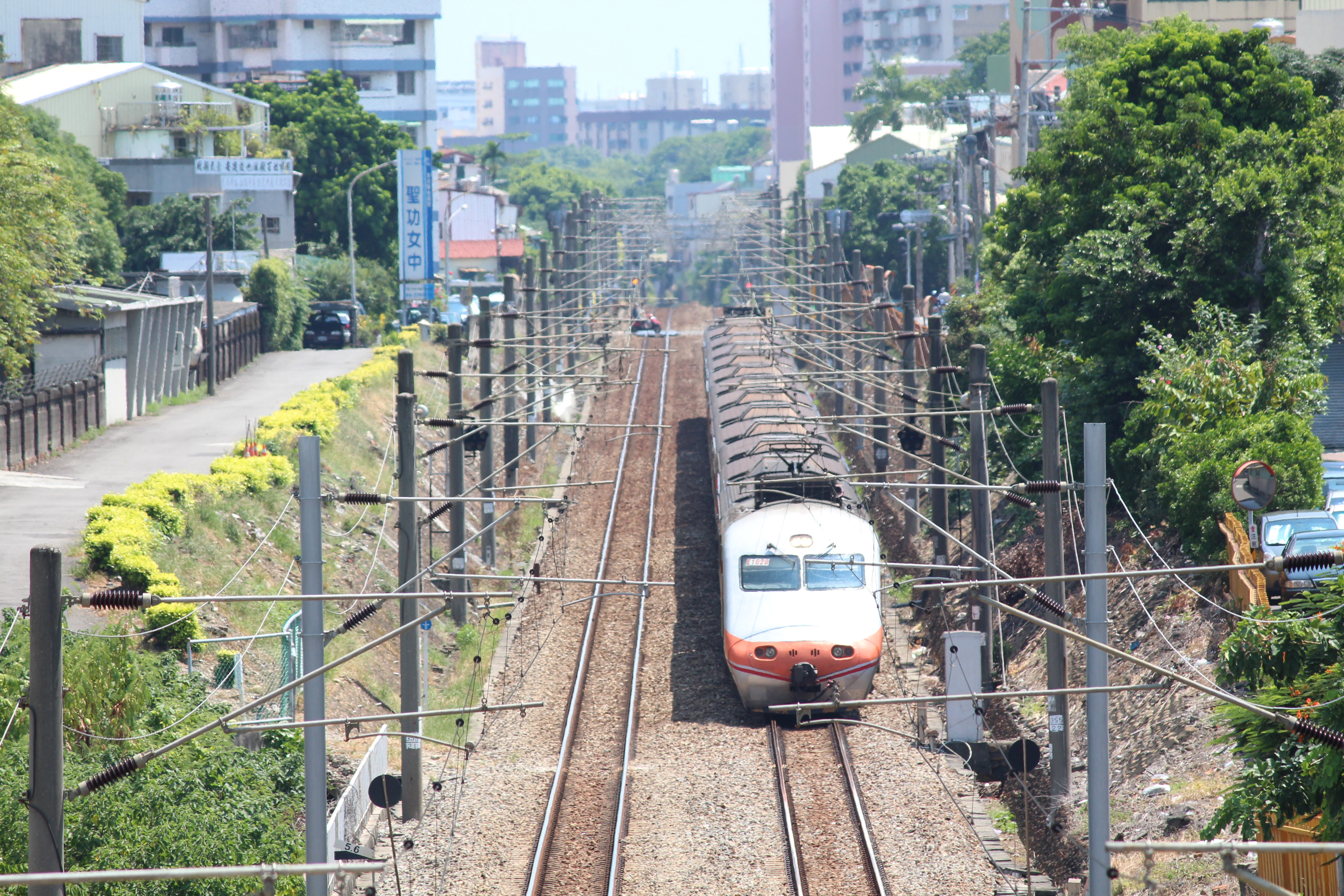

- North District in Tainan City
- Location: Tainan, Taiwan

Area
  - Total: 10 km^{2} (3.9 sq mi)

Population (January 2023)
  - Total: 126,229
  - Density: 13,000/km^{2} (33,000/sq mi)
- Website: www.tnnorth.gov.tw/en/

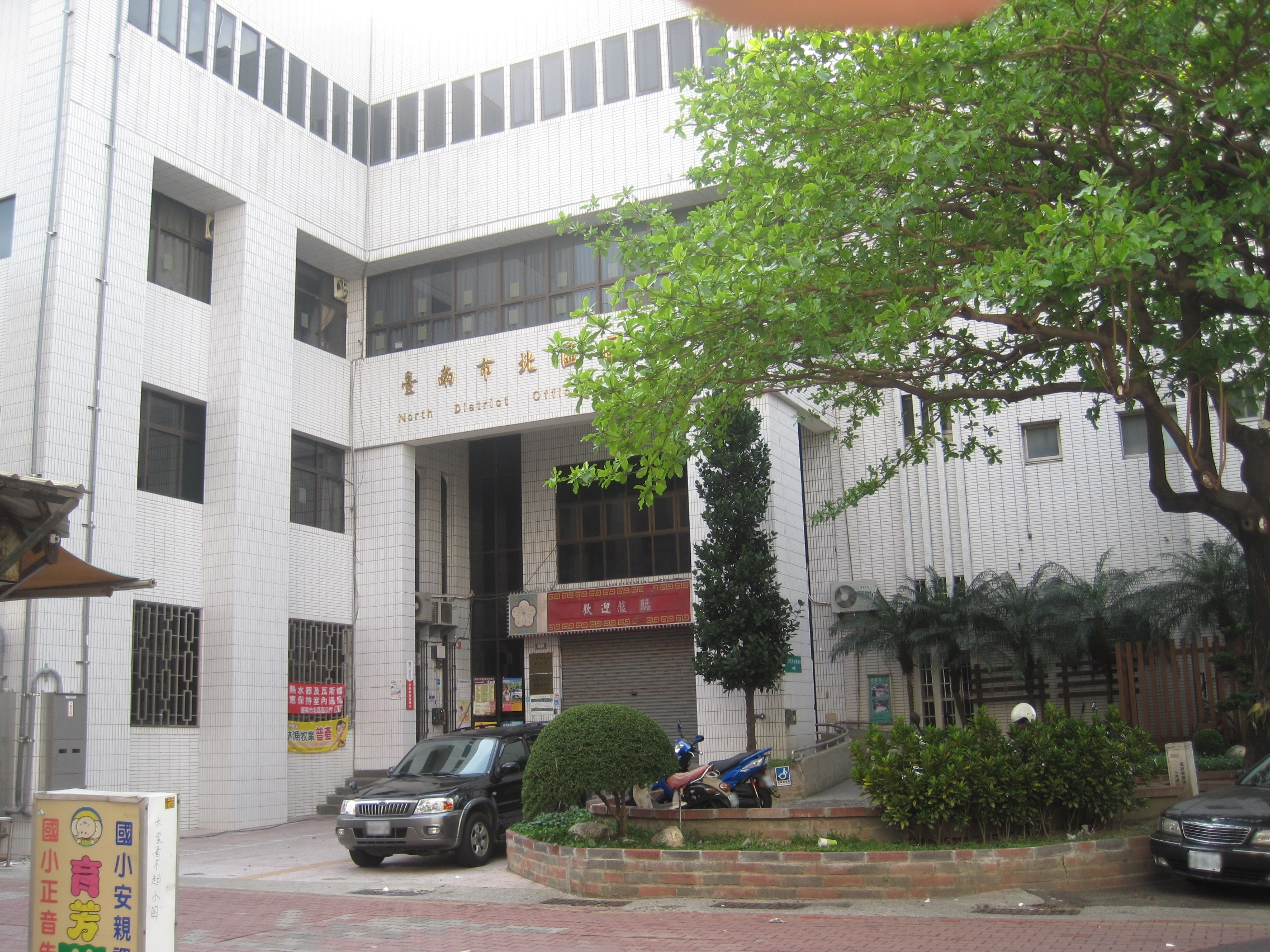
North District Office

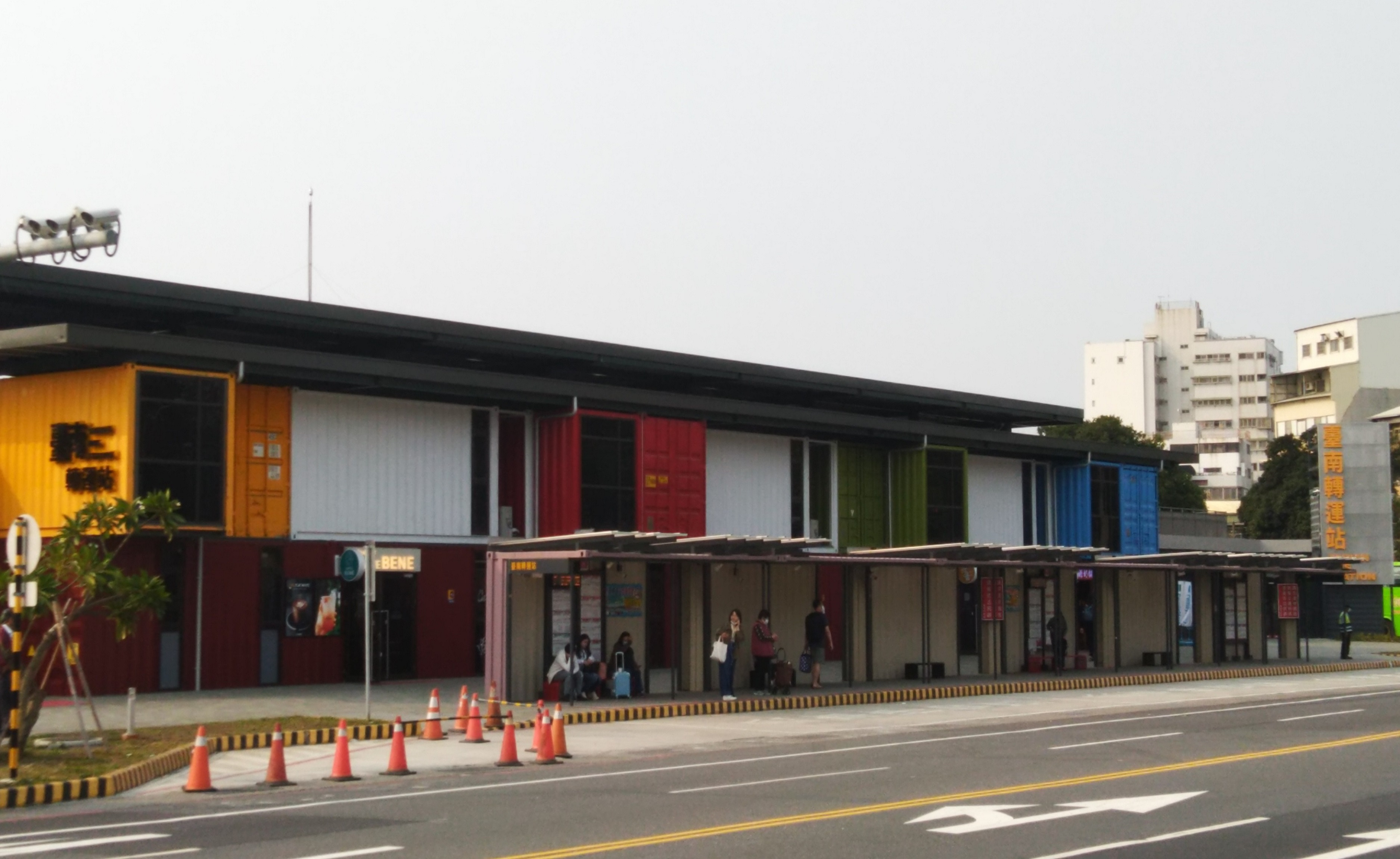
Tainan Bus Station

North District (Chinese: 北區; pinyin: Běi Qū; Pe̍h-ōe-jī: Pak-khu) is a district home to 126,446 people located in Tainan, Taiwan.

== Geography ==
- Population: 126,229 people (January 2023)
- Area: 10,434 km^{2}

== Administrative divisions ==
The district consists of Kaiyuan, Tungxing, Lihang, Zhenxing, Renai, Dafeng, Chongsing, Heshun, Zhengjiao, Chenggong, Wenyuan, Dagang, Zhonglou, Gongyuan, Yuanbao, Yongxiang, Chengde, Wencheng, Dahe, Xianbei, Changsheng, Gexing, Beimen, Xiaobei, Daguang, Daxing, Changxing, Beihua, Huade, Fude, Liren, Shuangan and Yuanmei Village.

== Education ==
- National Tainan Second Senior High School
- Sheng Kung Girls' High School

== Infrastructures ==
- National Cheng Kung University Hospital

== Tourist attractions ==
- Da Kuan-yin Ting Xing-ji Gong
- Kai-ji Goddess Temple
- San-shan Guo-wang Temple
- Tainan Children's Science Museum
- Tainan Cultural and Creative Park
- Tainan Flower Night Market
- Tainan Park
- Xiao-bei Tourist Night Market
- Xi-hwa Temple

== See also ==
- Tainan
