= National Tainan Second Senior High School =

Coordinates: 23.0055°N 120.2138°E

National Tainan Second Senior High School 國立臺南第二高級中學
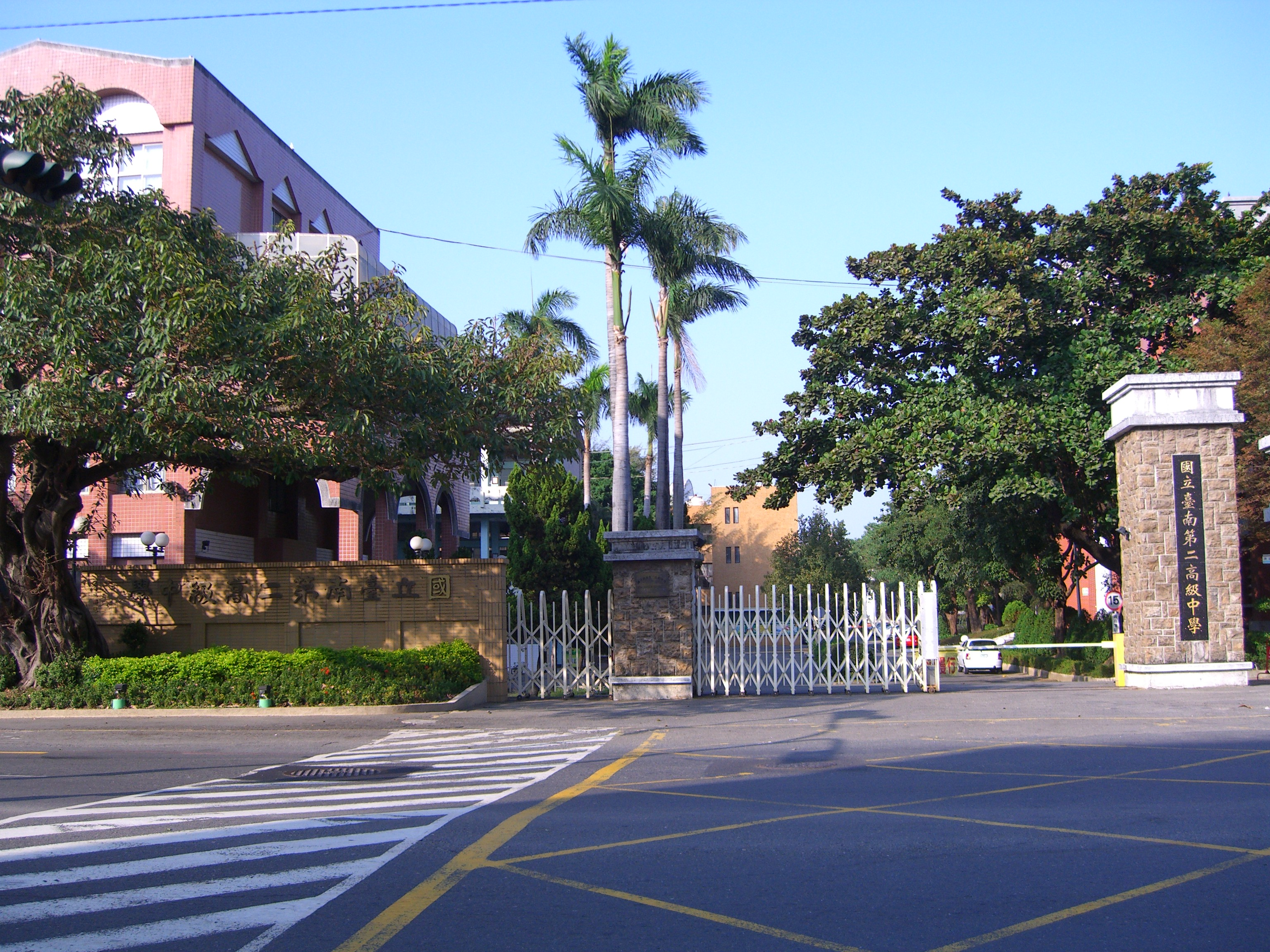
- North, Tainan, Taiwan

Information
- Type: Senior high school
- Established: May 1914

The National Tainan Second Senior High School (TNSSH; Chinese: 國立臺南第二高級中學) is a senior high school in North District, Tainan, Taiwan. It was established in May 1914 during the period of Japanese rule. It was the first senior high school in middle and southern Taiwan. The school is one of the most prestigious high schools in the city. As for the recent high school entry exam, which is mandatory for a student in Taiwan for attending high school, a student must have the top 10-11% mark in the test in order to gain admission to the school.

== History ==
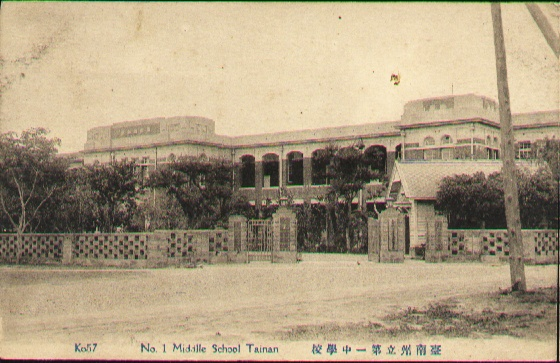
No. 1 Middle School, Tainan, Japanese Taiwan

1914. Established as No. 1 Middle School, Tainan (臺南州立第一中學校)

1988. The school commenced its semester with the new professional art class. It was the first professional art class in southern Taiwan. As the school began, one of the traditions of the school was also changed by enrolling the first female students into the new art program.

1994. The new construction of the Science Building was completed, one year later; the astronomical observatory was also completed.

1996. In response to teachers and students seeking for more information in education and teaching material, the high school set up the internet connection with the information database in National Cheng Kung University. The school was the first one in Taiwan that had an internet connection with a university's academic database.

1998. The new construction of the Art Building was completed. It provided students another place to accomplish their goals within the art fields.

== Notable alumni ==
=== Academics ===
- Cho-yun Hsu, historian
- Ong Iok-tek, scholar and activist

=== Politicians ===
- Lin Bih-jaw, former Secretary-General to the President
- King Pu-tsung, former Secretary-General of the National Security Council
- Lee Ming-liang, former Minister of the Department of Health
- Wong Chung-chun, Member of the Legislative Yuan
- Lee Chun-yee, Member of the Legislative Yuan
- Shih Chih-ming, 11th and 12th Mayor of Tainan

=== Entertainers ===
- ADian, drummer of 831
- Ang Lee, filmmaker (transferred to National Tainan First Senior High School)
- Jacky Wu, television show host and singer

== See also ==
- Education in Taiwan
