= Tang Te-chang Memorial Park =

Commemorative park in Tainan, Taiwan

- 湯德章紀念公園
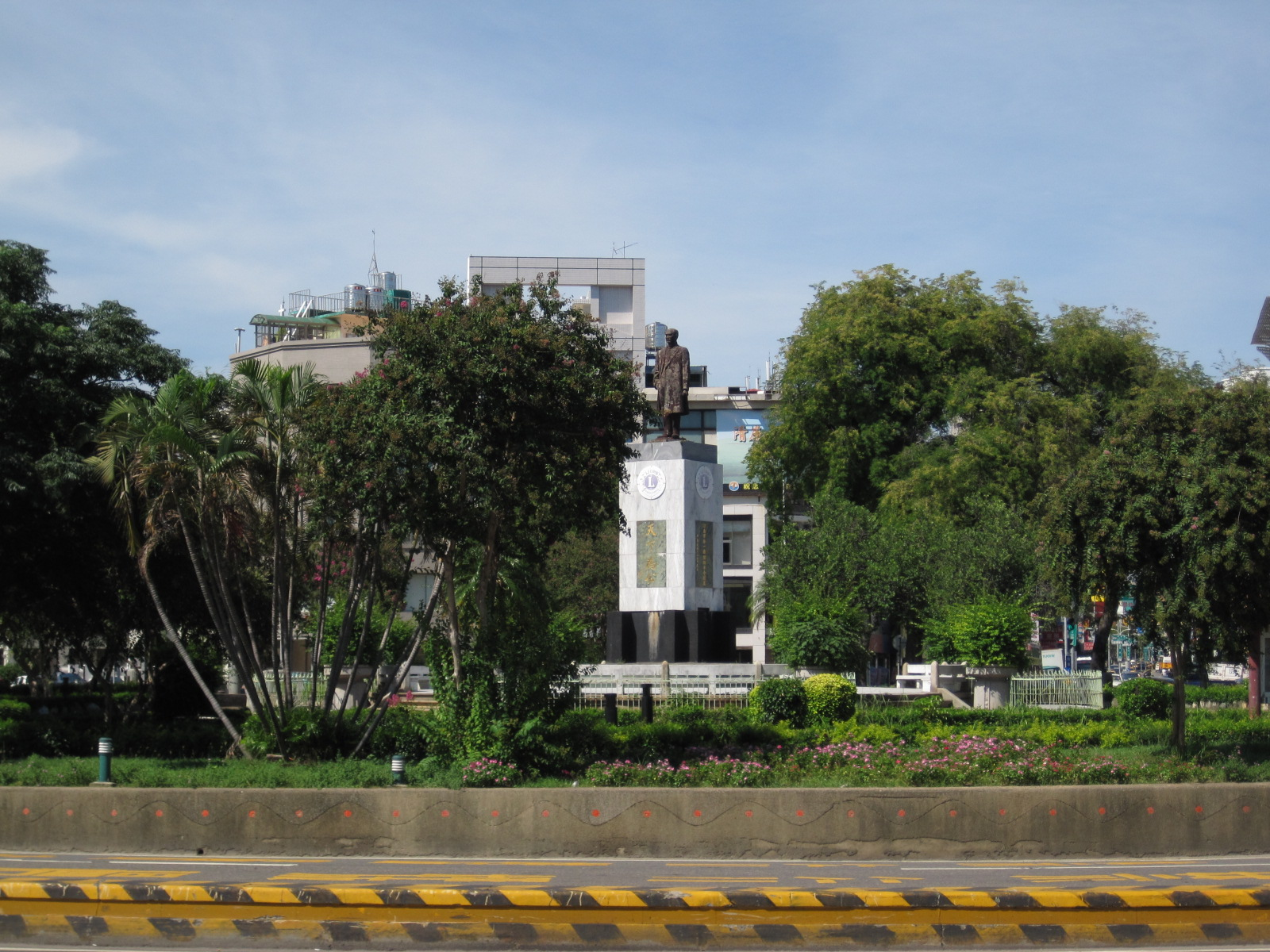
- Interactive map of Tang Te-chang Memorial Park
- Type: memorial park
- Location: West Central, Tainan, Taiwan
- Coordinates: 22°59′33.4″N 120°12′18.1″E
- Opening: 1907

The Tang Te-chang Memorial Park (traditional Chinese: 湯德章紀念公園; simplified Chinese: 汤德章纪念公园; pinyin: Tāngdézhāng Jìniàn Gōngyuán) is a memorial park in West Central District, Tainan, Taiwan to commemorate late lawyer Tang Te-chang.

== History ==
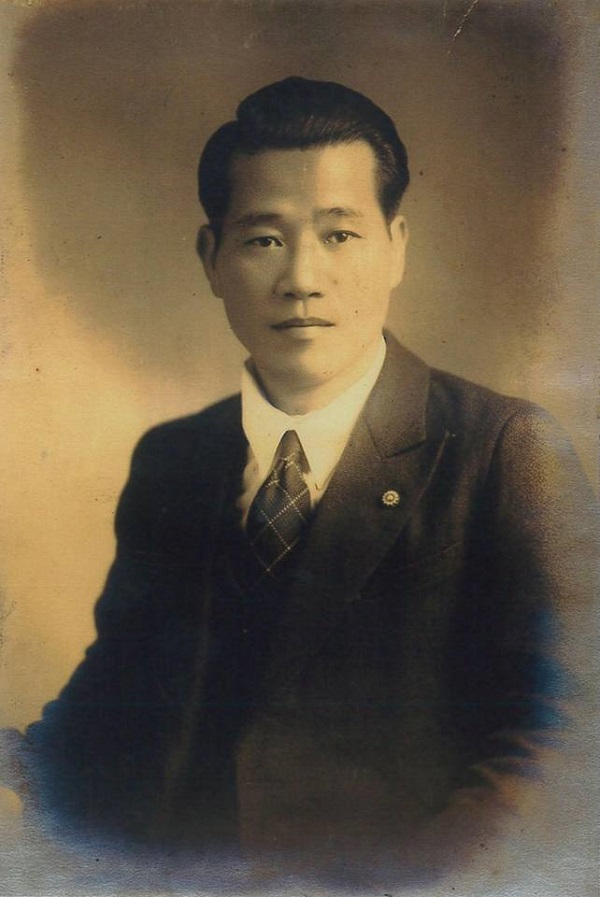
Tang Te-chang

=== Empire of Japan ===
In 1907, local residents erected a statue of Kodama Gentarō, the fourth Governor-General of Taiwan, one year after his death. The statue was imported to Taiwan from the Kingdom of Italy in 1904 and shipped to Tainan in 1905. In 1911, the park became a traffic circle and the wall surrounding the park was torn down. In 1916, the park was named Kodama Park(児玉公園) and subsequently Taisho Park (大正公園).

=== Republic of China ===
After the handover of Taiwan from Japan to the Republic of China in 1945, the park was renamed Min Sheng Green Park. On 13 March 1947, lawyer Tang Te-chang was shot dead at the park as part of the February 28 Incident. In 1997, the park was renamed Tang Te-chang Memorial Park by Tainan Mayor George Chang to honor Tang. He erected a bust of Tang.

On 10 March 2013, various organizations and the PCT Church and Society Committee convened at the park to commemorate the life and legacy of Tang. On 22 February 2014, the statue of Sun Yat-sen was torn down and painted red by the Alliance of Referendum for Taiwan and its supporters. The act prompted the police to arrest the alliance leader, although he was released shortly afterwards. In December 2015, the original head of the Kodama statue was found by artists working at the old barracks of the Imperial Japanese Army. On 20 September 2017, restoration work began at the park to better fit the Japanese style of the surrounding buildings. The restoration costed NT$8 million and was estimated to be completed within 150 days at the end of February 2018.

== Architecture ==
The park is located at a traffic circle in Tainan city center. Seven streets converge to the traffic circle.

== Transportation ==
The park is accessible within walking distance southwest of Tainan Station of Taiwan Railway.

== See also ==
- List of tourist attractions in Taiwan
