= List of national monuments of Taiwan =

"National monument" (Chinese: 國定古蹟; pinyin: Guódìng Gǔjī) is the highest designation possible given to historic sites in Taiwan, followed by municipal and county (city) monuments. The designations are outlined in the Cultural Heritage Preservation Act, and monuments are preserved by the Bureau of Cultural Heritage, a subdivision of the Executive Yuan.

According to the Cultural Heritage Preservation Act, Chapter 1, Section 3, historic sites are defined as "architectural works and its ancillary facilities built for the needs of human life, which are of outstanding universal value from the point of view of history, art or science." The first iteration of the Act in 1982 divided these monuments into levels 1, 2, and 3, with 1 being the highest. Subsequent revisions to the act redefined the levels into the designations used today. According to the December 2001 revision, the following sites are known as national monuments:

- Level 1 monuments as of June 30, 1997
- Level 2 monuments in non-special municipalities (everywhere except Taipei and Kaohsiung) as of June 30, 1997
- National monuments designated after June 30, 1997

Meanwhile, all other monuments in special municipalities are designated as municipal monuments, while all other monuments in counties and cities are designated as county (city) monuments. Though the numerical designation is not in official use anymore, they still see use in colloquial usage.

== Overview ==
As of March 16, 2020, there are 967 historic sites protected under the Cultural Heritage Preservation Act, with 107 designated as national monuments. Tainan City has the most national monuments at 22, followed by Taipei City at 19. Notably, there are no national monuments in eastern Taiwan, though Batongguan Trail does cross into Hualien County.

The Bureau of Cultural Heritage also categorizes the monuments into types, as follows:

Color coded table
Category	Chinese	Count
Temple	寺廟	25
Government	衙署	12
Fort	關塞	12
Residence	宅第	11
City wall	城郭	8
Industrial	產業	5
Tomb	墓葬	5
Lighthouse	燈塔	5
Train station	車站	3
School	書院	3
Plaque	碑碣	2
Paifang	牌坊	1
Church	教堂	1
Bridge	橋樑	1
Ancestral shrine	祠堂	1
Other	其他	12

== List ==
Name		Location		Category	Designated
Monopoly Bureau	專賣局	Taipei City	Zhongzheng	Government	1998/06/10
National Taiwan Museum	臺灣總督府博物館	Taipei City	Zhongzheng	Other	1998/06/10
Control Yuan Building	監察院	Taipei City	Zhongzheng	Government	1998/07/30
Taipei Guest House	臺北賓館	Taipei City	Zhongzheng	Residence	1998/07/30
Judicial Building	司法大廈	Taipei City	Zhongzheng	Government	1998/07/30
Presidential Office Building	總統府	Taipei City	Zhongzheng	Government	1998/07/30
Executive Yuan Building	行政院	Taipei City	Zhongzheng	Government	1998/07/30
Walls of Taipei	臺北府城	Taipei City	Zhongzheng	City wall	1998/09/03
Shilin Official Residence	蔣中正宋美齡士林官邸	Taipei City	Shilin	Other	2005/05/25
Taiwan Governor-General Railways Headquarters	台灣總督府交通局鐵道部	Taipei City	Datong	Industrial	2007/05/25
Chiang Kai-shek Memorial Hall	臺灣民主紀念園區	Taipei City	Zhongzheng	Other	2007/11/09
Yen Chia-kan Residence	嚴家淦故居	Taipei City	Zhongzheng	Residence	2010/07/23
Taipei Railway Workshop	臺北機廠	Taipei City	Xinyi	Industrial	2015/04/26
Teacher's Mansion	陳悅記祖宅(老師府)	Taipei City	Datong	Residence	2018/08/22
Datong House	大同之家(含網球場)	Taipei City	Zhongzheng	Other	2018/08/22
Freedom House	自由之家	Taipei City	Zhongzheng	Other	2018/08/22
Dalongdong Baoan Temple	大龍峒保安宮	Taipei City	Datong	Temple	2018/11/12
Bangka Lungshan Temple	艋舺龍山寺	Taipei City	Wanhua	Temple	2018/11/12
Zhongshan Hall	臺北公會堂	Taipei City	Zhongzheng	Other	2019/01/24
Ershawan Battery	二沙灣砲台	Keelung City	Zhongzheng	Fort	1983/12/28
Dawulun Fort	大武崙砲台	Keelung City	Anle	Fort	1985/08/19
Gongzi Liao Fort	槓仔寮砲台	Keelung City	Xinyi	Fort	2009/12/23
Fort Santo Domingo	淡水紅毛城	New Taipei City	Tamsui	Government	1983/12/28
Xinzhuang Guangfu Temple	新莊廣福宮	New Taipei City	Xinzhuang	Temple	1985/08/19
Lin Family Mansion and Garden	林本源園邸	New Taipei City	Banqiao	Residence	1985/08/19
Yinshan Temple	鄞山寺	New Taipei City	Tamsui	Temple	1985/08/19
Hobe Fort	滬尾礮臺	New Taipei City	Tamsui	Fort	1985/08/19
Oxford College	理學堂大書院	New Taipei City	Tamsui	School	1985/08/19
Luzhou Lee Family Residence	蘆洲李宅	New Taipei City	Luzhou	Residence	2018/01/23
Lee Teng-fan's Ancient Residence	李騰芳古宅	Taoyuan City	Daxi	Residence	1985/08/19
Baishajia Lighthouse	觀音白沙岬燈塔	Taoyuan City	Guanyin	Lighthouse	2021/05/09
Zheng Yong-xi Residence	進士第(鄭用錫宅第)	Hsinchu City	North	Residence	1985/08/19
Yingxi Gate	竹塹城迎曦門	Hsinchu City	East	City wall	1985/08/19
Tomb of Zheng Yong-xi	鄭用錫墓	Hsinchu City	East	Tomb	1985/08/19
Hsinchu Prefectural Hall	新竹州廳	Hsinchu City	North	Government	1998/06/22
Hsinchu Railway Station	新竹火車站	Hsinchu City	East	Train station	1998/06/23
Jin Guang Fu Mansion	金廣福公館	Hsinchu County	Beipu	Residence	1983/12/28
Tomb of Zheng Chong-he	鄭崇和墓	Miaoli County	Houlong	Tomb	1985/08/19
Wufeng Lin Family Mansion and Garden	霧峰林家	Taichung City	Wufeng	Residence	1985/11/27
Old Taichung Railway Station	臺中火車站	Taichung City	Central	Train station	1995/04/22
Luce Memorial Chapel	路思義教堂	Taichung City	Xitun	Church	2019/04/25
Taichung Prefectural Hall	臺中州廳	Taichung City	West	Government	2019/04/25
Lukang Longshan Temple	鹿港龍山寺	Changhua County	Lukang	Temple	1983/12/28
Changhua Confucian Temple	彰化孔子廟	Changhua County	Changhua City	Temple	1983/12/28
Yuanching Temple	元清觀	Changhua County	Changhua City	Temple	1985/08/19
Daodong Tutorial Academy	道東書院	Changhua County	Hemei	School	1985/08/19
Yi Yuan Mansion	馬興陳宅(益源大厝)	Changhua County	Xiushui	Residence	1985/11/27
Shengwang Temple	聖王廟	Changhua County	Changhua City	Temple	1985/11/27
Lukang Tianhou Temple	鹿港天后宮	Changhua County	Lukang	Temple	2019/12/02
Batongguan Trail	八通關古道	Nantou County	Zhushan	Plaque	1987/04/17
Beigang Chaotian Temple	北港朝天宮	Yunlin County	Beigang	Temple	1985/11/27
Mailiao Gongfan Temple	麥寮拱範宮	Yunlin County	Mailiao	Temple	2012/07/18
Chiayi Old Prison	嘉義舊監獄	Chiayi City	East	Government	2005/05/26
Chiayi Cheng Huang Temple	嘉義城隍廟	Chiayi City	East	Temple	2015/05/05
Tomb of Wang De-lu	王得祿墓	Chiayi County	Lioujiao	Tomb	1983/12/28
Bengang Shuixian Temple	笨港水仙宮	Chiayi County	Xingang	Temple	1985/11/27
Temple of the Five Concubines	五妃廟	Tainan City	West Central	Temple	1983/12/28
Eternal Golden City	二鯤鯓砲臺(億載金城)	Tainan City	Anping	Fort	1983/12/28
Tainan Confucian Temple	臺南孔子廟	Tainan City	West Central	Temple	1983/12/28
State Temple of the Martial God	祀典武廟	Tainan City	West Central	Temple	1983/12/28
Fort Provintia	赤嵌樓	Tainan City	West Central	Government	1983/12/28
Fort Zeelandia	台灣城殘蹟	Tainan City	Anping	City wall	1983/12/28
Sicao Fortress	四草砲臺	Tainan City	Annan	Fort	1985/08/19
Grand Matsu Temple	大天后宮	Tainan City	West Central	Temple	1985/08/19
Beiji Temple	北極殿	Tainan City	West Central	Temple	1985/08/19
Kaiyuan Temple	開元寺	Tainan City	North	Temple	1985/08/19
Sanshan Guowang Temple	臺南三山國王廟	Tainan City	North	Temple	1985/08/19
Kaiji Tienhou Temple	開基天后宮	Tainan City	North	Temple	1985/11/27
Prefectural City God Temple	臺灣府城隍廟	Tainan City	West Central	Temple	1985/11/27
Duiyue Gate	兌悅門	Tainan City	West Central	City wall	1985/11/27
Nankunshen Daitian Temple	南鯤鯓代天府	Tainan City	Beimen	Temple	1985/11/27
Tainan District Court	台南地方法院	Tainan City	Anping	Government	1991/04/19
Tainan Railway Station	台南火車站	Tainan City	East	Train station	1998/12/18
Japanese 2nd Infantry Corps Headquarters	原日軍臺灣步兵第二聯隊營舍	Tainan City	East	Other	2003/11/10
Tainan Prefectural Hall	原台南州廳	Tainan City	West Central	Other	2003/11/10
Former Tainan Weather Observatory	原台南測候所	Tainan City	West Central	Other	2003/11/10
Remaining structures within Fort Zeelandia	熱蘭遮城城垣暨城內建築遺構	Tainan City	Anping	City wall	2004/10/07
Hilltop Garden Watercourse Museum	原臺南水道	Tainan City	Shanshang	Industrial	2005/09/29
Old City of Fongshan County	鳳山縣舊城	Kaohsiung City	Fongshan	City wall	1985/08/19
Fengshan Longshan Temple	鳳山龍山寺	Kaohsiung City	Fongshan	Temple	1985/11/23
Zhuzimen Power Plant	竹仔門電廠	Kaohsiung City	Meinong	Industrial	2003/10/28
Former Tangrong Brick Kiln	中都唐榮磚窯廠	Kaohsiung City	Sanmin	Industrial	2005/03/11
Former Japanese Navy Fongshan Communication Center	原日本海軍鳳山無線電信所	Kaohsiung City	Fongshan	Other	2010/08/30
Cihou Fort	旗後礮臺	Kaohsiung City	Cijin	Fort	2019/02/22
Former British Consulate at Takao	打狗英國領事館及官邸	Kaohsiung City	Gushan	Government	2019/02/22
Hengchun Old City Wall	恆春古城	Pingtung County	Hengchun	City wall	1985/08/19
Kucapungane	魯凱族好茶舊社	Pingtung County	Wutai	Other	1991/05/24
Siadanshuei River Railway Bridge	下淡水溪鐵橋	Pingtung County	Pingtung City	Bridge	1997/04/02
Penghu Tianhou Temple	澎湖天后宮	Penghu County	Magong	Temple	1983/12/28
Xiyu Western Fort	西嶼西臺	Penghu County	Xiyu	Fort	1983/12/28
Magong Old City Wall	媽宮古城	Penghu County	Magong	City wall	1985/08/19
Xiyu Lighthouse	西嶼燈塔	Penghu County	Xiyu	Lighthouse	1987/04/17
Xiyu Eastern Fort	西嶼東臺	Penghu County	Xiyu	Fort	1991/11/23
Jinguitou Fortress	馬公金龜頭砲臺	Penghu County	Magong	Fort	2001/11/21
Fengguiwei Fort	馬公風櫃尾荷蘭城堡	Penghu County	Magong	Fort	2001/11/21
Gongbei Fort	湖西拱北砲臺	Penghu County	Huxi	Fort	2001/11/21
Wentai Pagoda	文臺寶塔	Kinmen County	Jincheng	Other	1985/08/19
Chastity Arch for Qiu Liang-gong's Mother	邱良功母節孝坊	Kinmen County	Jincheng	Paifang	1985/08/19
Tomb of Chen Zhen	陳禎墓	Kinmen County	Jinsha	Tomb	1985/08/19
Qionglin Tsai Family Ancestral Shrine	瓊林蔡氏祠堂	Kinmen County	Jinhu	Ancestral shrine	1985/08/19
Tomb of Chen Jian	陳健墓	Kinmen County	Jinsha	Tomb	1988/11/11
Shueitou Huang Family Hall	水頭黃氏酉堂別業	Kinmen County	Jincheng	Residence	1988/11/11
Xujiang Xiaowo Stone Inscription	虛江嘯臥碣群	Kinmen County	Jincheng	Plaque	1991/11/23
Kinmen Zhuzi Hall	金門朱子祠	Kinmen County	Jincheng	School	1991/11/23
Wuqiu Lighthouse	烏坵燈塔	Kinmen County	Wuqiu	Lighthouse	2018/02/12
Dongquan Lighthouse	東犬燈塔	Lienchiang County	Juguang	Lighthouse	1988/11/11
Dongyong Lighthouse	東湧燈塔	Lienchiang County	Dongyin	Lighthouse	2016/06/01
