= Yiyuan =

Yiyuan or Yi Yuan may refer to:

- Yiyuan County in Zibo, Shandong, China
- Hospital (Han novel) (医院; Yīyuàn), 2016 Chinese novel by Han Song
- Garden of Pleasance (怡园; Yí Yuán) in Suzhou, Jiangsu, China
- Arts Garden (藝園; Yì Yuán) in Sé, Macau, China
- Yiyuan Subdistrict, Daqing, Heilongjiang, China
- Yiyuan Subdistrict, Weihai, Shandong, China
- Yiyuan Subdistrict, Wuhan, Hubei, China
- Yi Yuan Mansion in Xiushui Township, Changhua County, Taiwan
