= Gongfan Temple =

Mazu temple in Mailiao, Yunlin

- 拱範宮
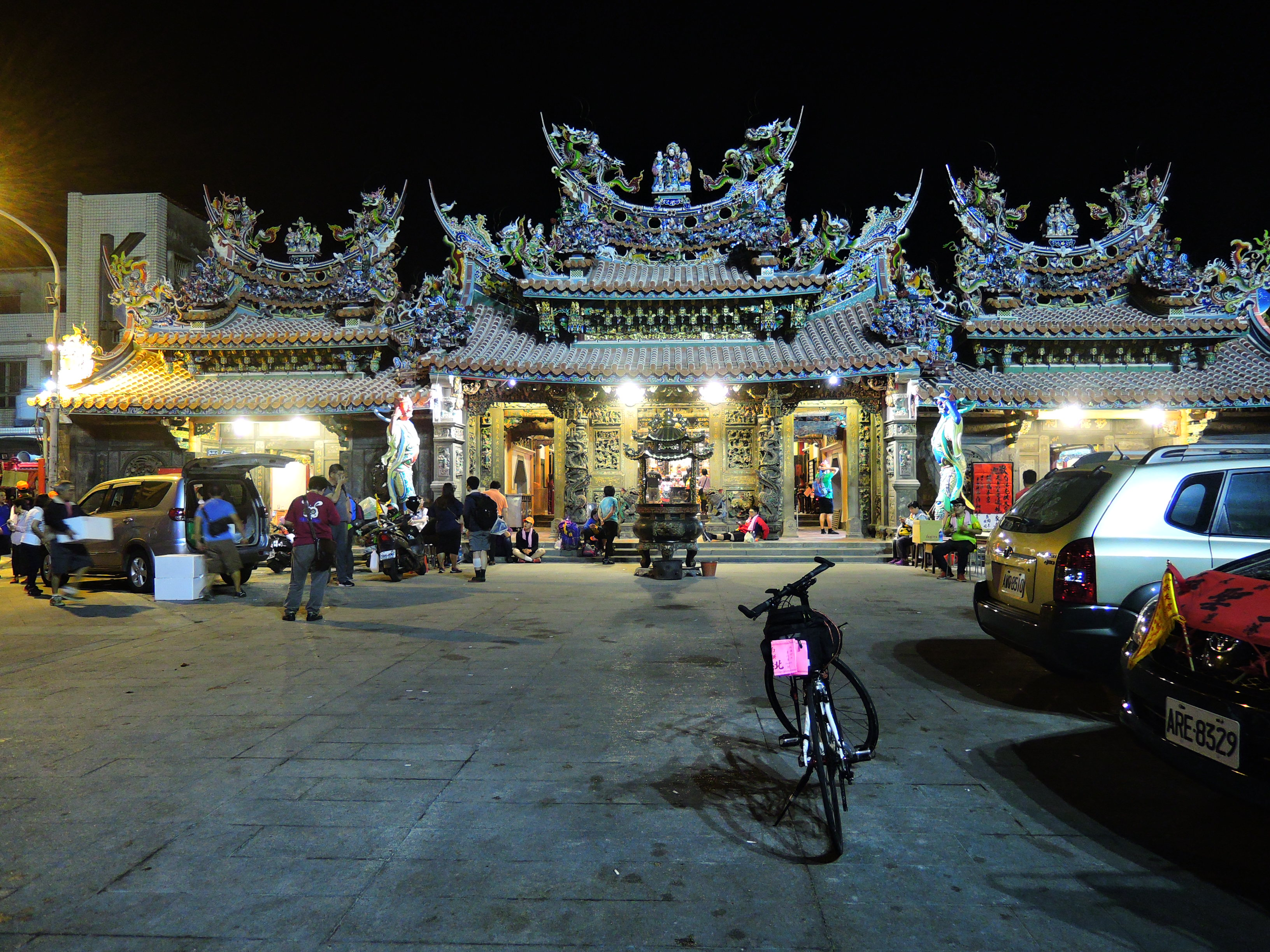
- Entrance of Gongfan Temple

Religion
- Affiliation: Taoism
- Deity: Mazu

Location
- Location: Mailiao, Yunlin
- Country: Taiwan
- Interactive map of Gongfan Temple
- Coordinates: 23.7482°N 120.2557°E

Architecture
- Completed: 1742
- Direction of façade: West
- National monument of Taiwan
- Official name: 國定古蹟麥寮拱範宮
- Type: Temple
- Designated: 18 September 2012

Mailiao Gongfan Temple (traditional Chinese: 麥寮拱範宮; simplified Chinese: 麦寮拱范宫; pinyin: Màiliáo Gǒngfàn Gōng) is a Mazu temple located in Mailiao, Yunlin County, Taiwan. The temple is protected as a national monument, the highest designation for a historical site within Taiwan.

== History ==
Gongfan Temple's history can be traced to 1685, when a Linji school monk named Chunzhen Chanshi (純真禪師) traveled across the Taiwan Strait from Meizhou Island in mainland China to a settlement west of downtown Mialiao known as Haifeng Port (海豐港). A temple was built there to house the Mazu statue that Chunzhen Chanshi carried, which is known as Kaishan Liuma (開山六媽). In 1742, Haifeng Port was destroyed by a flood on the Xinhuwei River, so the temple was moved to its current location.

In 1800, the temple was reconstructed and enlarged, funded by local residents. In 1827, a rear hall was added to worship Guanyin, built on land donated by a local businessman, into its current three by three grid formation. In 1874, the building showed signs of deterioration; even though some proposed to repair the temple, the construction halted halfway due to insufficient funding. A flood in 1898 dealt serious damage to the building, especially the two side halls. Therefore, with the permission of the Japanese government, the temple was reconstructed from 1906 to 1908. Subsequent floods and termites damaged the building again, so between 1930 and 1937, the temple was repaired. This time, craftsmen were hired from all over the island and even mainland China, significantly improving the architecture of the buildings.

In 2006, in recognition of the temple's historical and architectural value, the Yunlin County government protected the temple on the county level. In 2012, the temple became a national monument. According to the Bureau of Cultural Heritage, the temple was primarily protected for the historical artifacts dating from the 1930 reconstruction. The most recent construction ran between 2011 and 2018, funded by the national government, the temple itself, and the Formosa Plastics Group.

== Deities ==
Gongfan Temple is primarily dedicated to the sea goddess Mazu, who is known by the name "Kaishan Liuma" (開山六媽) within the temple. The Mazu statue is located in the main hall. Other deities also in the temple include:

- Wenchang Dijun (文昌帝君)
- Shennong (神農大帝)
- Mazu's parents (聖父母)
- Goddess of Childbirth (註生娘娘)
- Eighteen Arhats
- City God (城隍爺)
- Tudigong (福德正神)

== Gallery ==
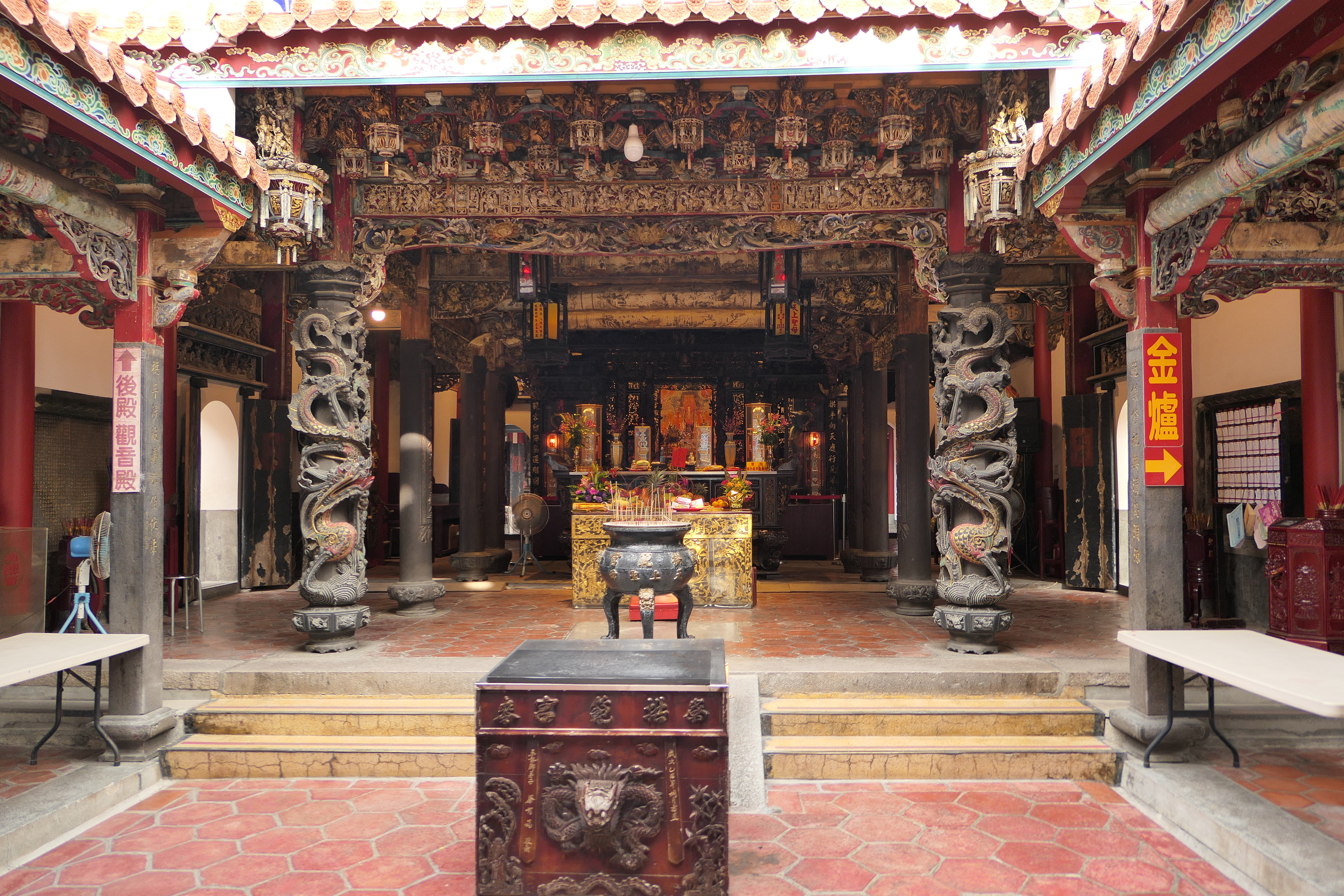
Main hall, dedicated to Mazu

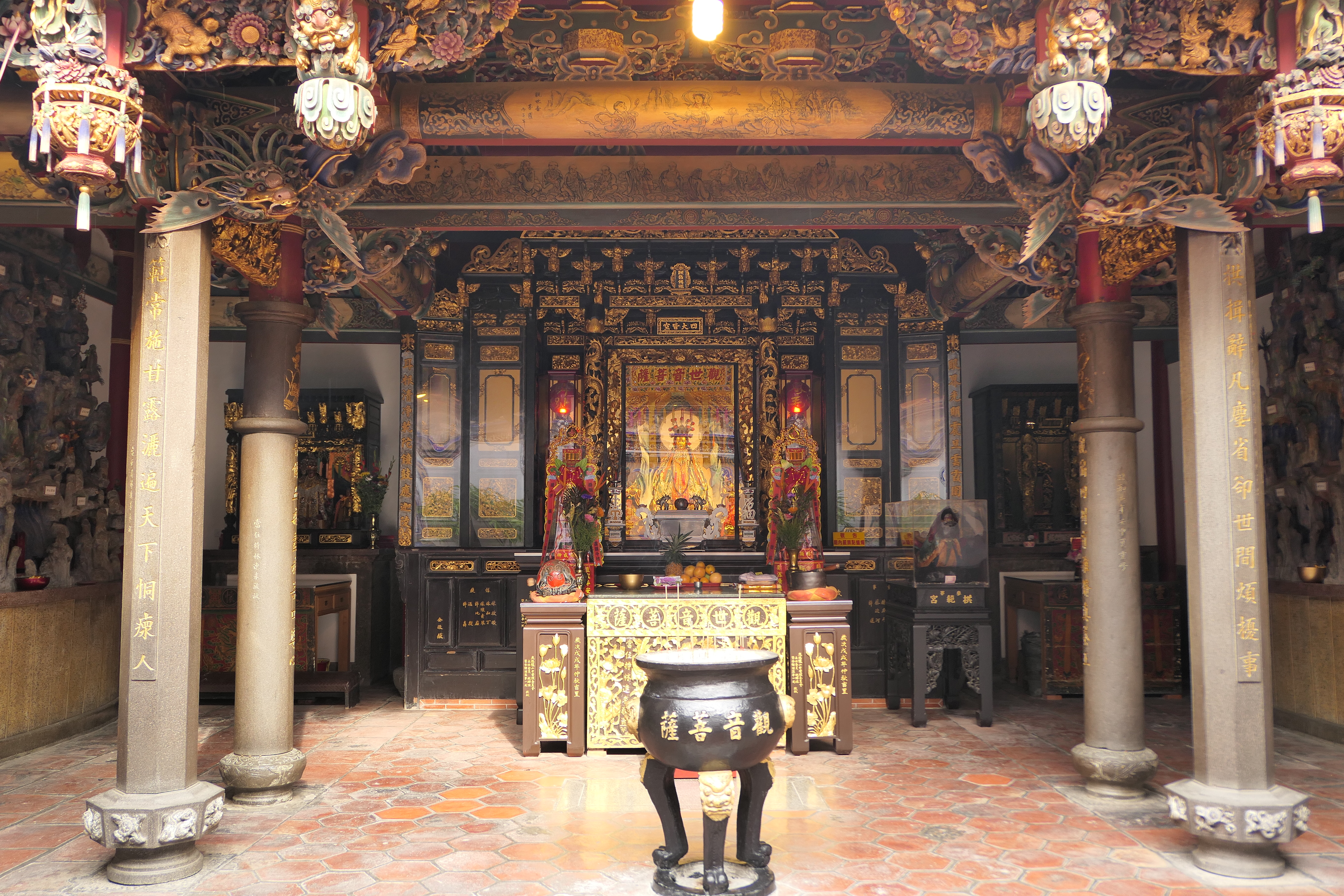
Rear hall, dedicated to Guanyin
