= Minkuan Taiwanese Opera Troupe =

Taiwanese Opera

Minkuan Taiwanese Opera Troupe is a Taiwanese opera troupe founded by Lin Chu-an in Taipei, 1970. It was registered as a performing arts organization in New Taipei City in 2001. Lin Chin-chuan is the current leader of the troupe.

== History ==
The Minkuan Taiwanese Opera Troupe was founded in November 1970 by Lin Chu-an and his wife Wang Shu-hua. Lin named the troupe “Minkuan (Minquan)” because it was located around Daqiaotou and Minquan West Road. In 1986, due to financial factors, the troupe closed down temporarily. Lin Chu-an and his family then joined the Hsin Ying Feng Opera Troupe for four years. In 1990, they bought the license of running Hsin Chu Sheng Opera Troupe and its full shares and incorporated some of its original members and performers, and continued to operate under the name Minkuan Hsin Chu Sheng Opera Troupe, which was later changed back to Minkuan Taiwanese Opera Troupe in 1991. In 2006, Lin Chin-chuan took over as the troupe leader.

== The Troupe Composition ==
The Minkuan Taiwanese Opera Troupe is a family-run troupe, with Lin Chu-an and his son Wang Chin-lung and Lin Chin-chuan as the backstage musicians, and his wife Wang Shu-hua, Cheng Chin-lan, his daughter Lin Chuan-chuan, and daughter-in-law Weng Li-ling as the front stage performers.

From 2015, the troupe participated in the National Center for Traditional Arts and Bureau of Cultural Heritage, Ministry of Culture's talent education program, young generation performers have become part of the toupe.
