= Hemei =

Urban township in Changhua County, Taiwan

Coordinates: 24°07′N 120°30′E

Hemei Township 和美鎮 Wabi
- Urban township
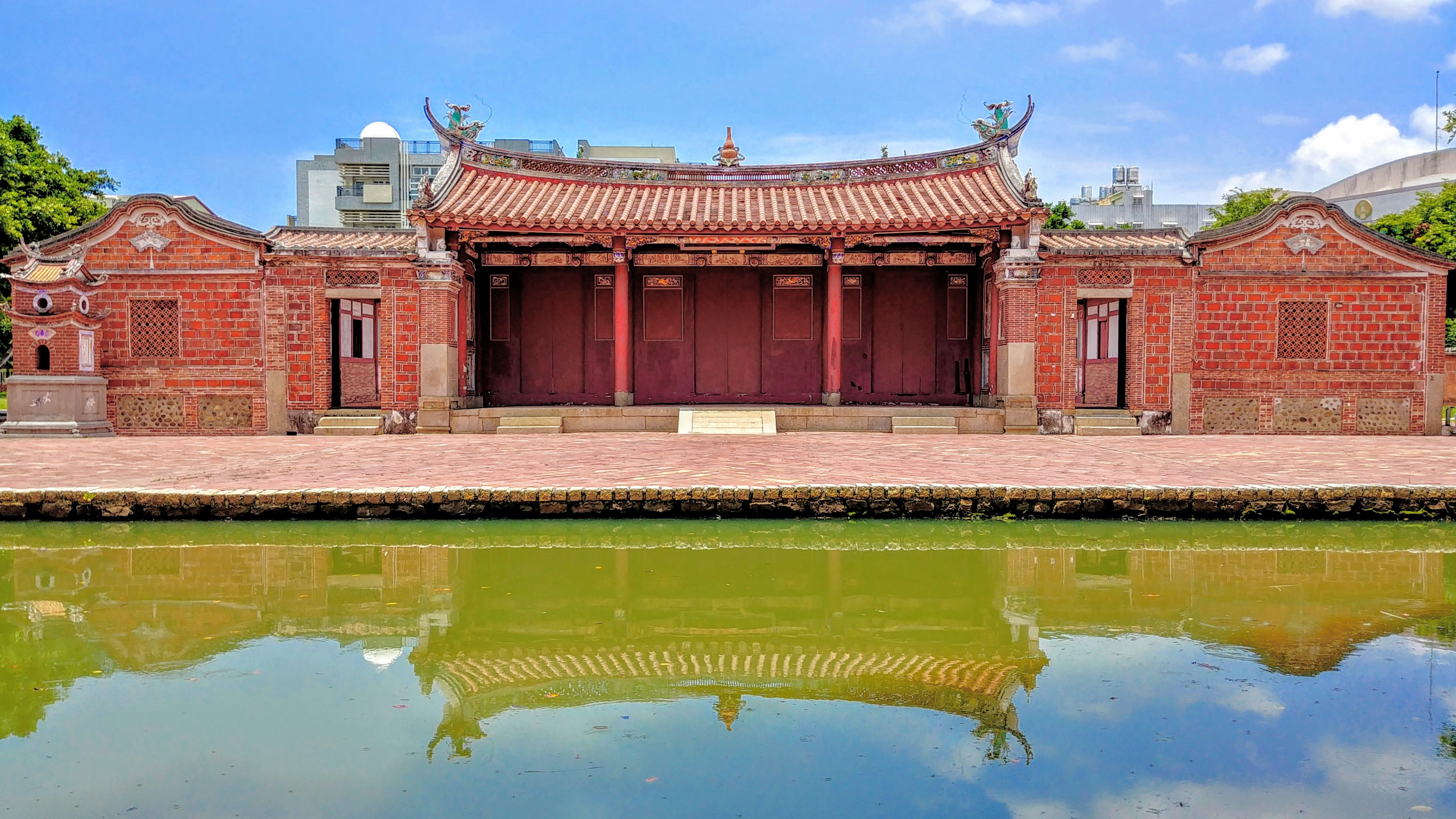
- Daodong Tutorial Academy in Hemei Township

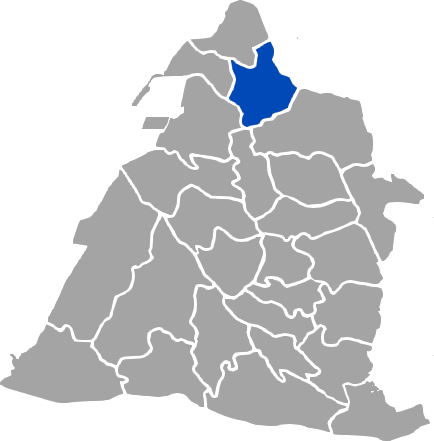
- Hemei Township in Changhua County
- Location: Changhua County, Taiwan

Area
  - Total: 40 km^{2} (15 sq mi)

Population (January 2023)
  - Total: 88,740
  - Density: 2,200/km^{2} (5,700/sq mi)
- Website: town.chcg.gov.tw/hemei (in Chinese)

Hemei Township
- Chinese: 和美鎮
- Hanyu Pinyin: Héměi Zhèn
- Wade–Giles: Ho^{2}-mei^{3} Chen^{4}
- Pha̍k-fa-sṳ: Fò-mî-chṳ́n
- Hokkien POJ: Hô-bí-tìn

Hemei Township is an urban township in northwestern Changhua County, Taiwan. It is bordered by the Dadu River to the north, Shengang and Xianxi to the west, Lukang and Xiushui to the south, and Changhua City to the east.

== History ==
An early name for the area that is now Hemei was Khah-lí-siān (卡里善), taken from the aboriginal Babuza language. It was late named Hô-bí-sòaⁿ (和美線). The shortened name Hemei became official with the formation of Hemei (Wabi) Village on 1 October 1920 under Japanese rule.

== Geography ==
Hemei encompasses 39.93 square kilometers and a population of 88,740, including 45,035 males and 43,705 females (January 2023).

== Administrative divisions ==
The township comprises 32 villages, which are Daxia, Detan, Ganjing, Haishe, Haoxiu, Hebei, Henan, Hetung, Hexi, Hunei, Jiabao, Jiali, Licheng, Mianqian, Nandian, Renai, Shanli, Sizhang, Tangyou, Tieshan, Touqian, Tucuo, Xinzhuang, Yagou, Yuanbei, Yuemei, Zengping, Zhaoan, Zhongliao, Zhongwei, Zhuying and Zhuyuan.

== Tourist attractions ==
Daodong Tutorial Academy, a former tutorial academy during the Qing dynasty and now a tourist attraction, is located on Heqing Road in Hemei proper.

== Transportation ==
In 2017, Changhua County Magistrate Wei Ming-gu announced intentions to have the Taichung MRT's Green line extend beyond Changhua City to area such as Hemei.

== Notable natives ==
- Yao Chia-wen, President of Examination Yuan (2002–2008)
