= Former British Consulate at Takao =

Historic former British consulate in Kaohsiung, Taiwan

- 打狗英國領事館
- The consular residence building at the Former British Consulate at Takao

General information
- Type: Former consulate
- Architectural style: Western Renaissance Revival
- Location: Gushan District, Kaohsiung, Taiwan
- Coordinates: 22°37′08.0″N 120°16′00.8″E
- Completed: 1879
- Owner: Kaohsiung City Government

Design and construction
- Architecture firm: McPhail & Co.
- Designations: National historic monument

The Former British Consulate at Takao (Chinese: 打狗英國領事館; pinyin: Dǎgǒu Yīngguó Lǐngshìguǎn) is a historic former British consulate located in Gushan District, Kaohsiung, Taiwan. Established during the Qing dynasty in the 19th century, the site played an important role in foreign trade and diplomacy following the opening of Taiwanese treaty ports. The current consular residence building was completed in 1879 and overlooks Sizihwan Bay and the entrance to Kaohsiung Harbor.

The site is designated as a national historic monument by the Ministry of Culture and is now a popular cultural and tourist attraction. It now functions as a museum and cultural venue, featuring exhibits on Taiwan’s treaty port era and the development of Kaohsiung.

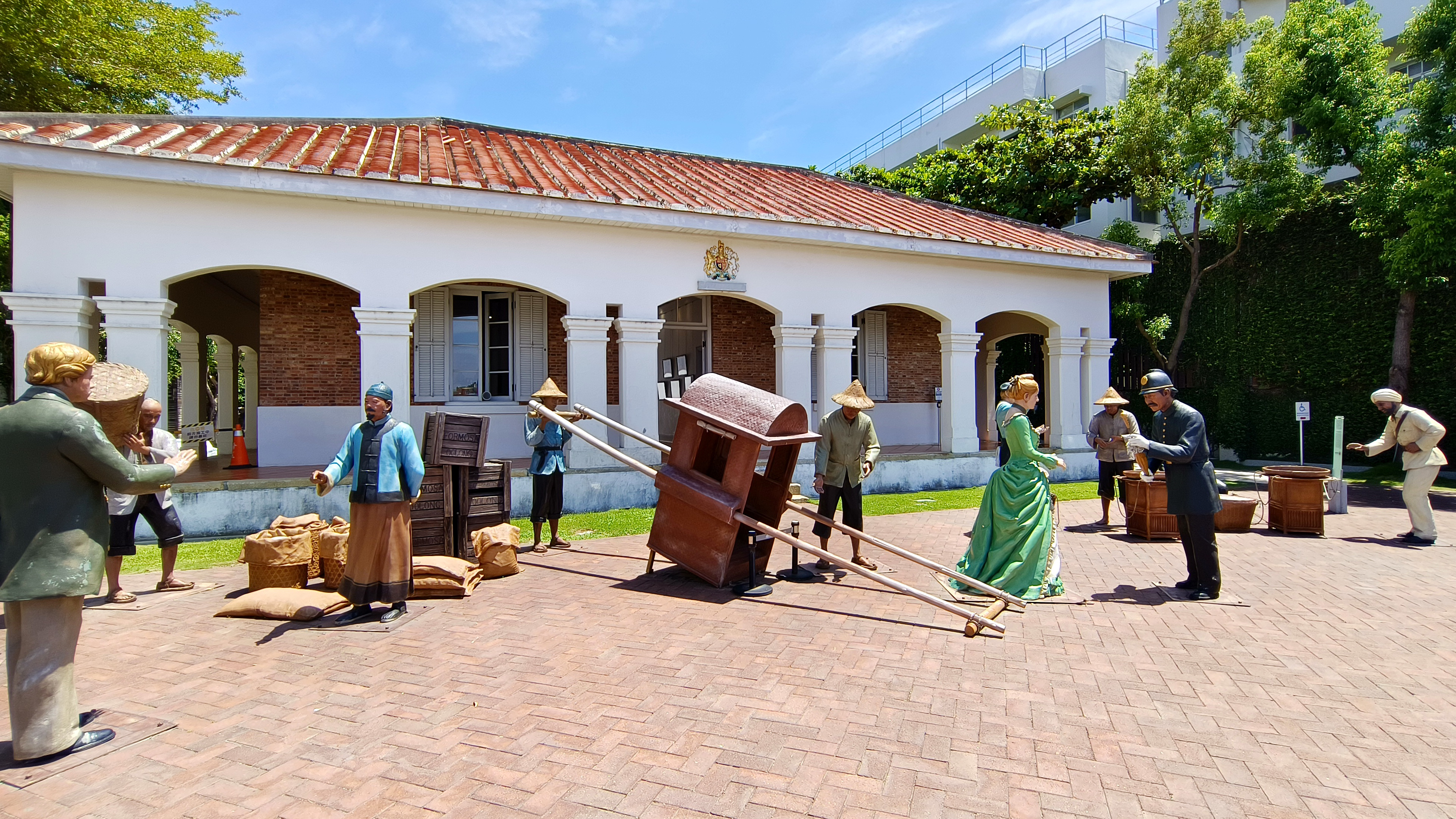
Outdoor exhibit at the Former British Consulate at Takao depicting historical trade and daily life during the treaty port era

== History ==
=== Establishment ===
Following the Treaty of Peking in 1860, the Qing dynasty opened several Taiwanese ports to foreign trade, including Takau (modern-day Kaohsiung), Anping, Tamsui, and Keelung.

In 1861 the British government appointed the naturalist and diplomat Robert Swinhoe as the first British vice-consul in Taiwan. Swinhoe initially established the consulate in Tamsui, but the office was relocated to Takau in 1864 due to the growing importance of the southern port in international trade.

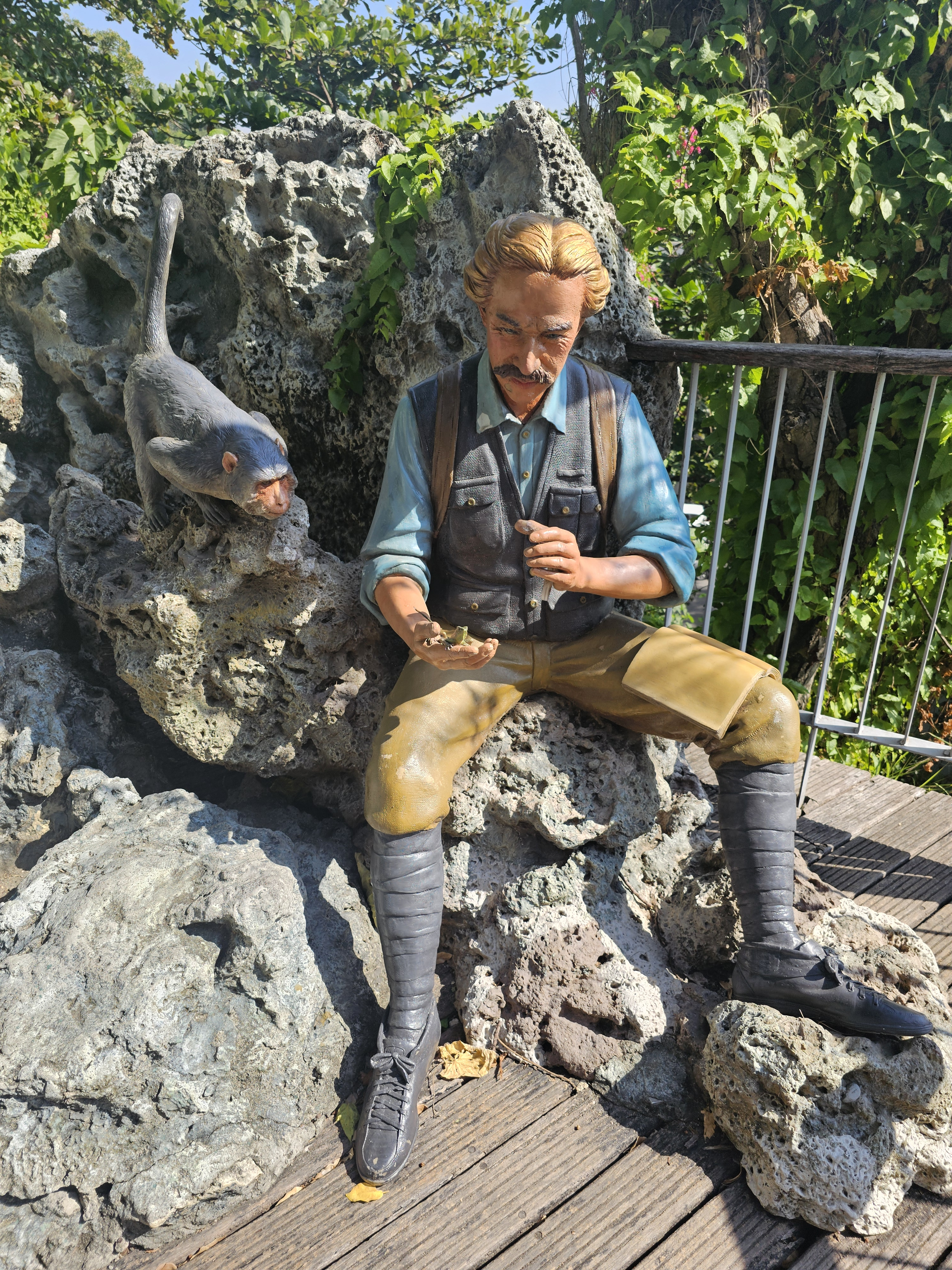
Outdoor exhibit depicting Robert Swinhoe along the steps ascending Shaochuantou hill

=== Construction ===
The current consular residence was constructed in 1879 by the British trading firm McPhail & Co. The building was erected on Shaochuantou hill overlooking Takao Harbor, providing a strategic view of maritime activity.

Construction materials were transported from Xiamen (then known as Amoy) across the Taiwan Strait. The complex consisted of both the consular office near the harbor and the residence located on the hill above the port.

=== Japanese colonial period ===
After the First Sino-Japanese War, Taiwan was ceded to the Empire of Japan under the Treaty of Shimonoseki in 1895. The British consulate continued operating for a number of years during the early period of Japanese rule but was eventually closed in 1910.

During the Japanese colonial period the building was repurposed for several functions. In 1931 it was converted into a marine observatory used for meteorological and oceanographic observation.

=== Post-war period ===
After World War II and the transfer of Taiwan to the Republic of China, the building was used by the Central Weather Bureau as a meteorological observatory for several decades.

In 1987 the site was designated a historic monument by the Taiwanese government. Restoration work was later undertaken by the Kaohsiung City Government in the early 2000s, and the building was reopened as a cultural heritage site and museum.

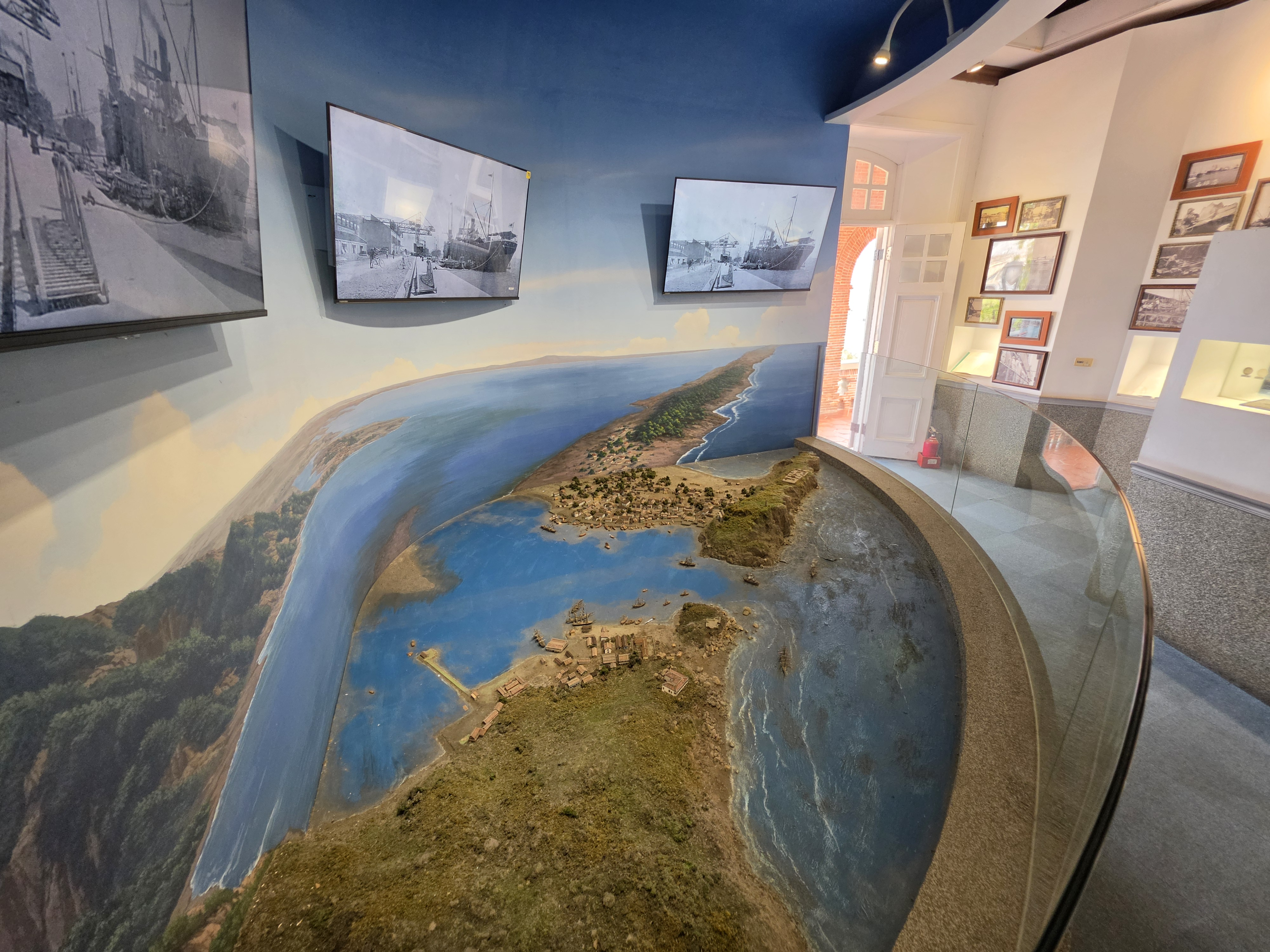
Interior exhibit showing a diorama of Takao harbor as it was in 1895

== Architecture ==
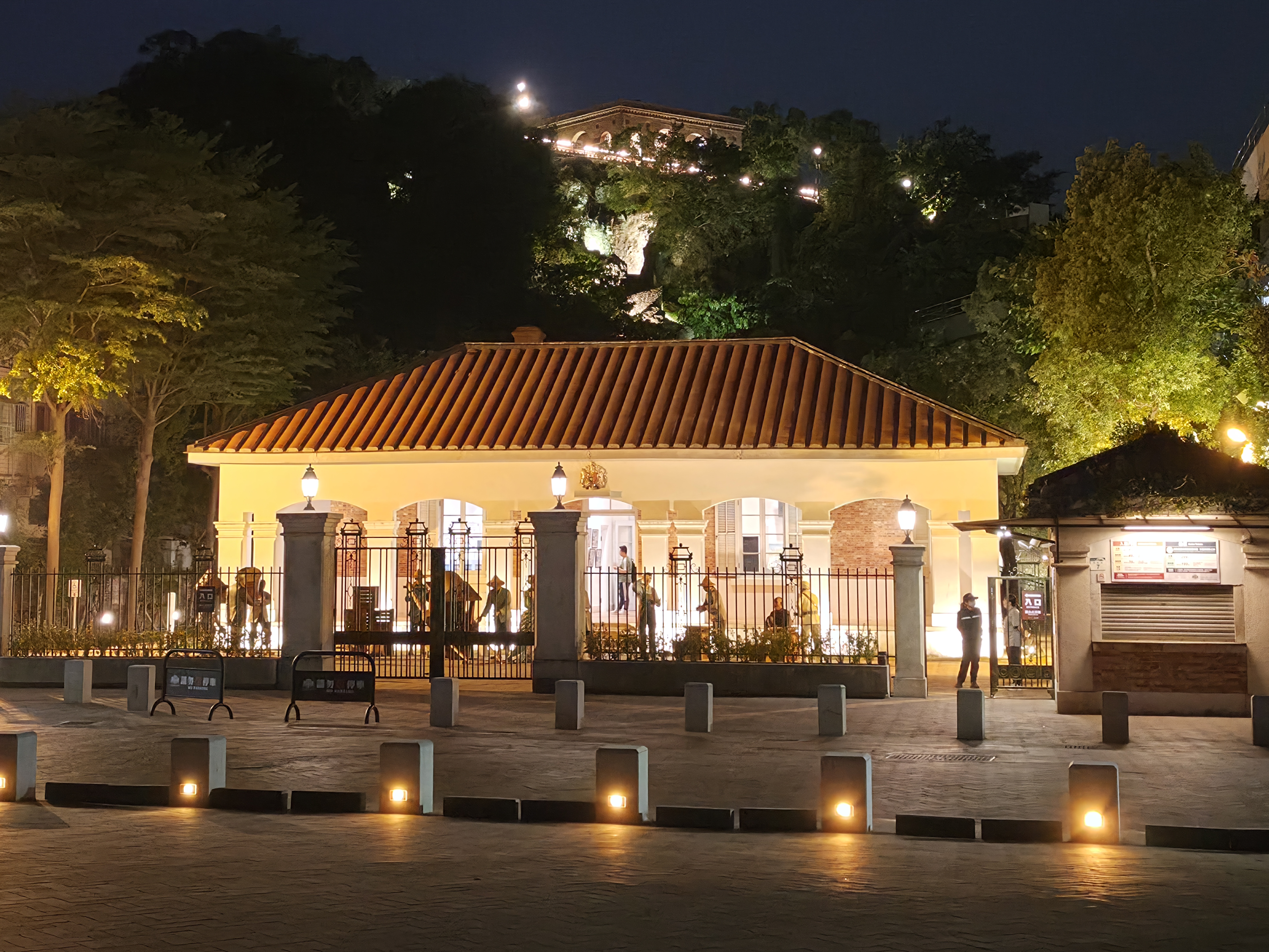
The Former British Consulate at Takao at night

The consular residence is a two-storey red-brick structure influenced by Renaissance architecture and Western colonial building styles of the 19th century. The design incorporates arched openings, symmetrical façades, and verandas that help improve ventilation in Taiwan's subtropical climate.

The building's elevated position on Shaochuantou hill provides panoramic views of Sizihwan Bay and the entrance to Kaohsiung Harbor. Its architectural style and construction techniques influenced later Western-style buildings constructed in Taiwan during the late Qing dynasty.

== Transportation ==
The site is accessible within walking distance of Hamasen station on the Kaohsiung MRT.

== See also ==
- List of museums in Taiwan
- Shoushan (Kaohsiung)
