= Kaiyuan Temple (Taiwan) =

Temple in North District, Tainan, Taiwan

- 開元寺
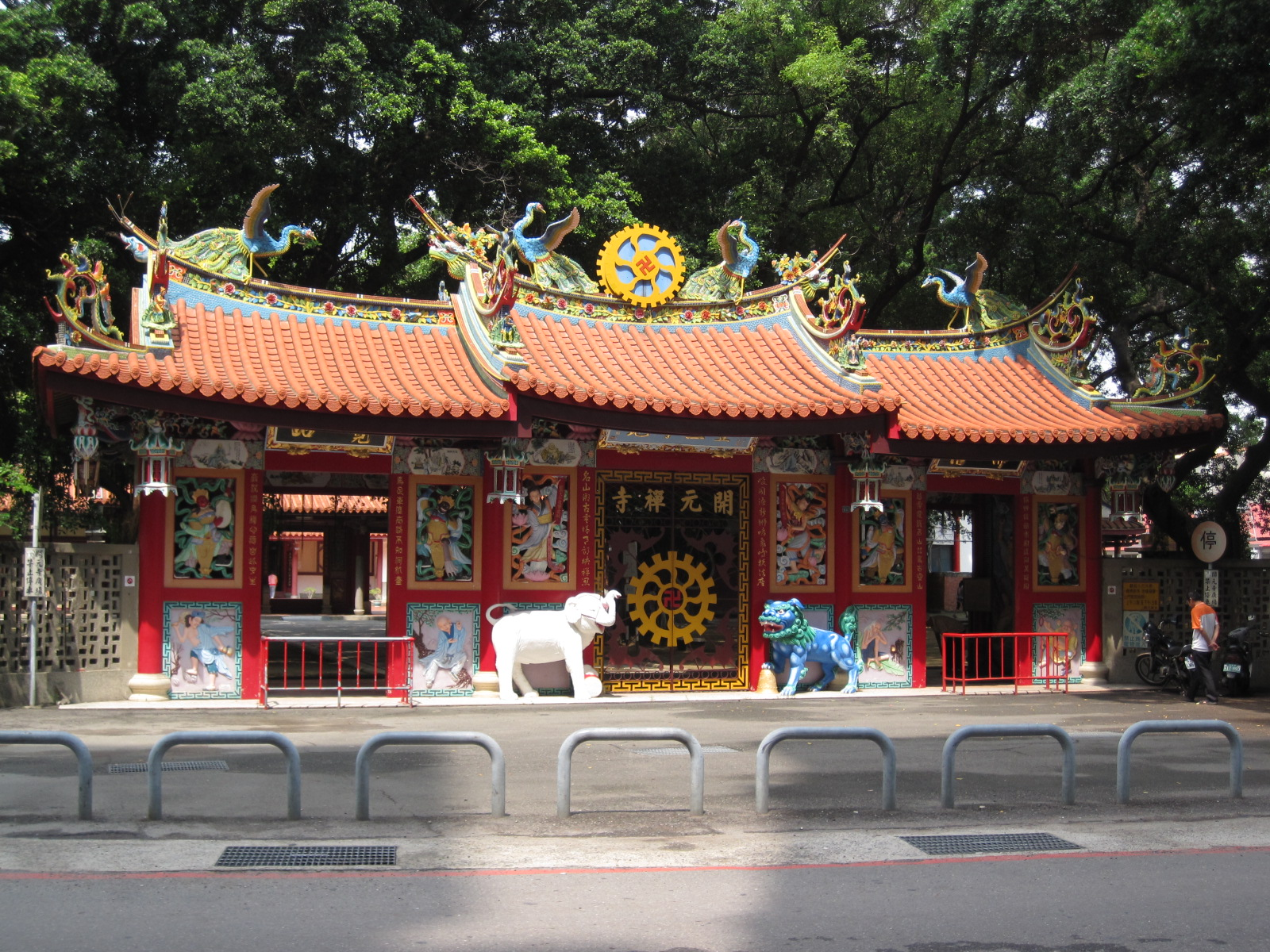
- The outer shanmen of Kaiyuan Temple

Religion
- Affiliation: Buddhism

Location
- Location: North District, Tainan
- Country: Taiwan
- Interactive map of Kaiyuan Temple
- Coordinates: 23.0111°N 120.2222°E

Architecture
- Completed: 1690
- National monument of Taiwan
- Type: Temple
- Designated: 19 August 1985

Kaiyuan Temple (Chinese: 開元寺; pinyin: Kāiyuán Sì), is a Buddhist temple located in North District, Tainan City, Taiwan. The grounds were initially a residence for Zheng Jing, the ruler of Kingdom of Tungning and the son of Koxinga (Zheng Chenggong), until the kingdom's downfall and subsequent transformation into a temple.

== History ==
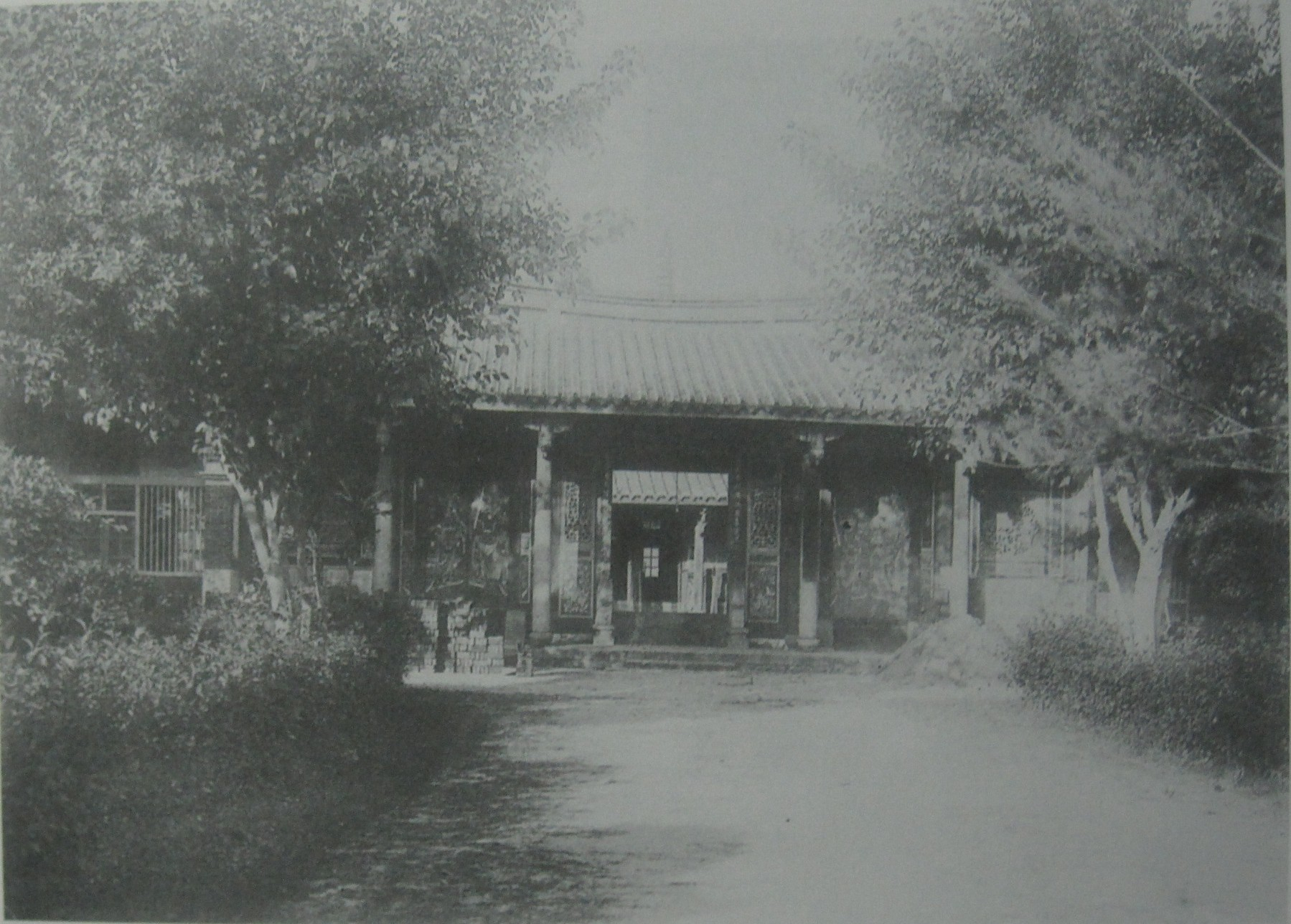
Kaiyuan Temple, circa 1933

Disheartened after several defeats to the Qing forces in Mainland China, in 1680, Zheng Jing retreated back to Taiwan and backed out of politics by relegating more responsibilities to his son, Zheng Kezang. Zheng Jing constructed a new residence called Beiyuan Villa (北園別館) for his aging mother, Queen Dong, and himself to live in peace. The Zheng family did not live in the residence for long: Zheng Jing fell ill and died on March 17, 1681, Zheng Kezang died in a coup in the villa immediately afterwards his father's death, and Queen Dong died on August 1 the same year. After the Kingdom of Tungning was conquered by the Qing in 1683, Beiyuan Villa was largely abandoned, except for an attempt at restoring it by Zhou Chang in 1686 only to desert the project halfway.

In 1690, Qing officials Wang Huaxing and Wang Xiaozong turned the former residence into a Buddhist temple on the basis that no Buddhist institutions existed in Tainan at the time. The two named the new temple "Haihui Temple" (Chinese: 海會寺; pinyin: Hǎihuì Xì). In 1777, the governor of Taiwan, Jiang Yuanshu, renovated and expanded the temple into its current layout and renamed it "Kaiyuan Temple". Between 1796 and 1859, the temple was briefly known as "Haijing Temple" (Chinese: 海靖寺; pinyin: Hǎijìng Xì) to celebrate Jiaqing Emperor's coronation. During the Japanese era, several academics in Tainan formed Nanshe (南社) to write and recite poetry, but was shut down in 1930 under the colonial government's Japanization campaign. The 1951 37.5% Arable Rent Reduction Act heavily decreased the temple's source of income from loaning out farmland, which led to the temple being seized by the Republic of China government in 1958 for tax evasion. On August 19, 1985, Kaiyuan Temple was protected as a "level 2 monument", which is currently known as a national monument.

== Architecture ==
Kaiyuan Temple is a rectangular complex with four central halls and two side halls, a layout that is unchanged since Jiang Yuanshu's renovation in 1777. Outside of the main complex, there is an outer shanmen built in 1960 that faces the street.

The inner shanmen serves as the main entrance to the temple complex itself. The gate was repaired in 1912 by De Yuan (得圓) and 1953 by Yin Ming (印明). It is five kaijian wide (six columns) and has three doors. There are menshen painted on each door by Cai Caoru and couplets on each doorframe by Lin Chaoyin. On the middle door, Sangharama and Skanda are painted as menshen instead of Qin Shubao and Yuchi Gong typically found in other temples.

Inside the complex, the first is hall is the Mi Le Hall (彌勒殿). The hall is subdivided into smaller rooms for Maitreya, the Four Heavenly Kings, Kṣitigarbha, and Koxinga. Behind the Mi Le Hall is the Daxiongbao Hall (大雄寶殿), dedicated to Gautama Buddha, Samantabhadra, and Manjushri. This hall used to be five kaijian wide (six columns), but in 1972, the hall was rebuilt with only three kaijian wide (four columns). The hall contains the oldest bronze bell in Taiwan, which was crafted in 1695. At the very back is the Dashi Hall (大士殿), which houses Guanyin. Unlike the rest of the temple, this hall is a reinforced concrete building completed in 1967. The flanking halls contain altars for Bodhidharma and several monks, lodging for worshippers, and spaces for meditation.

== Gallery ==
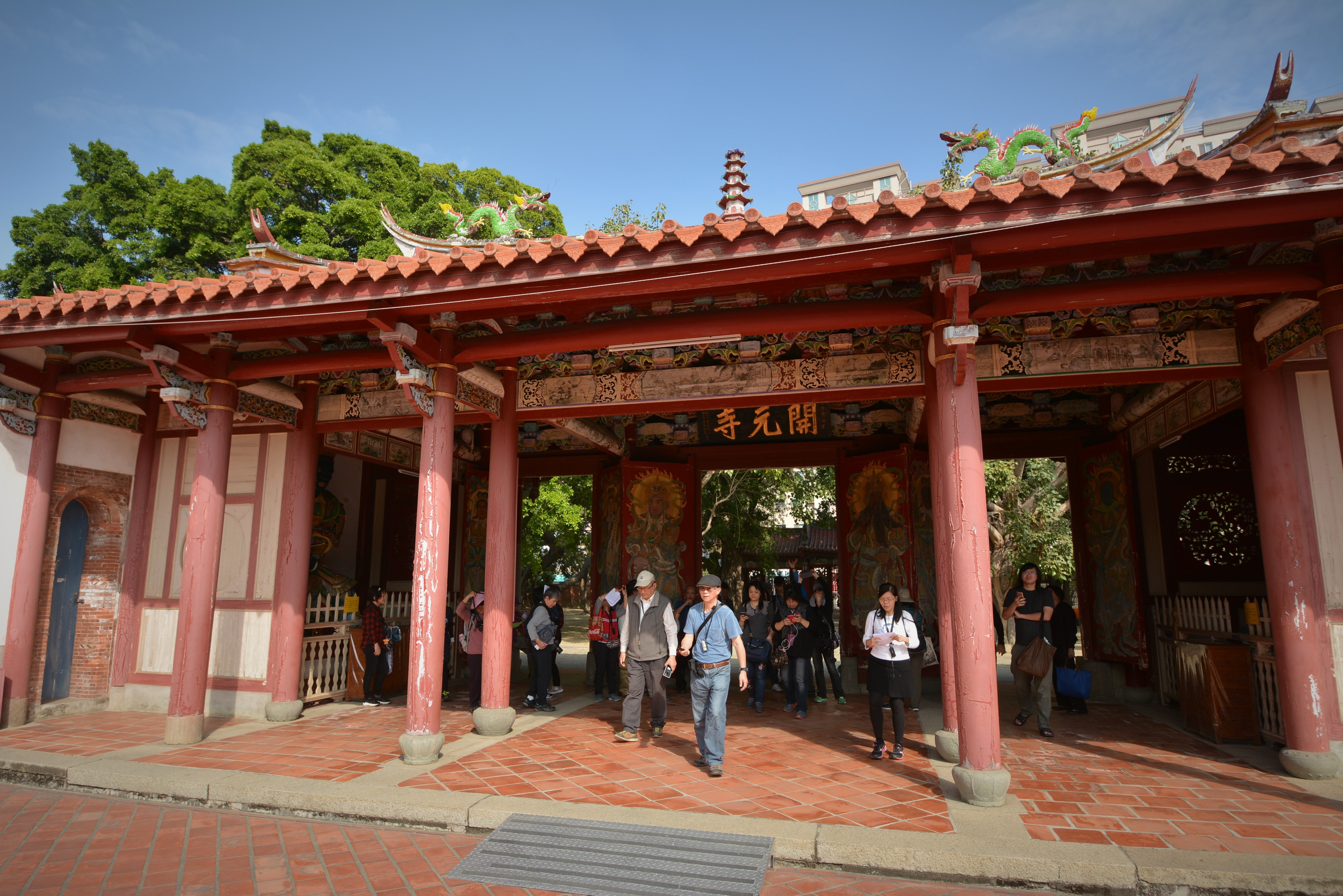
The inner shanmen as seen from inside of the complex.

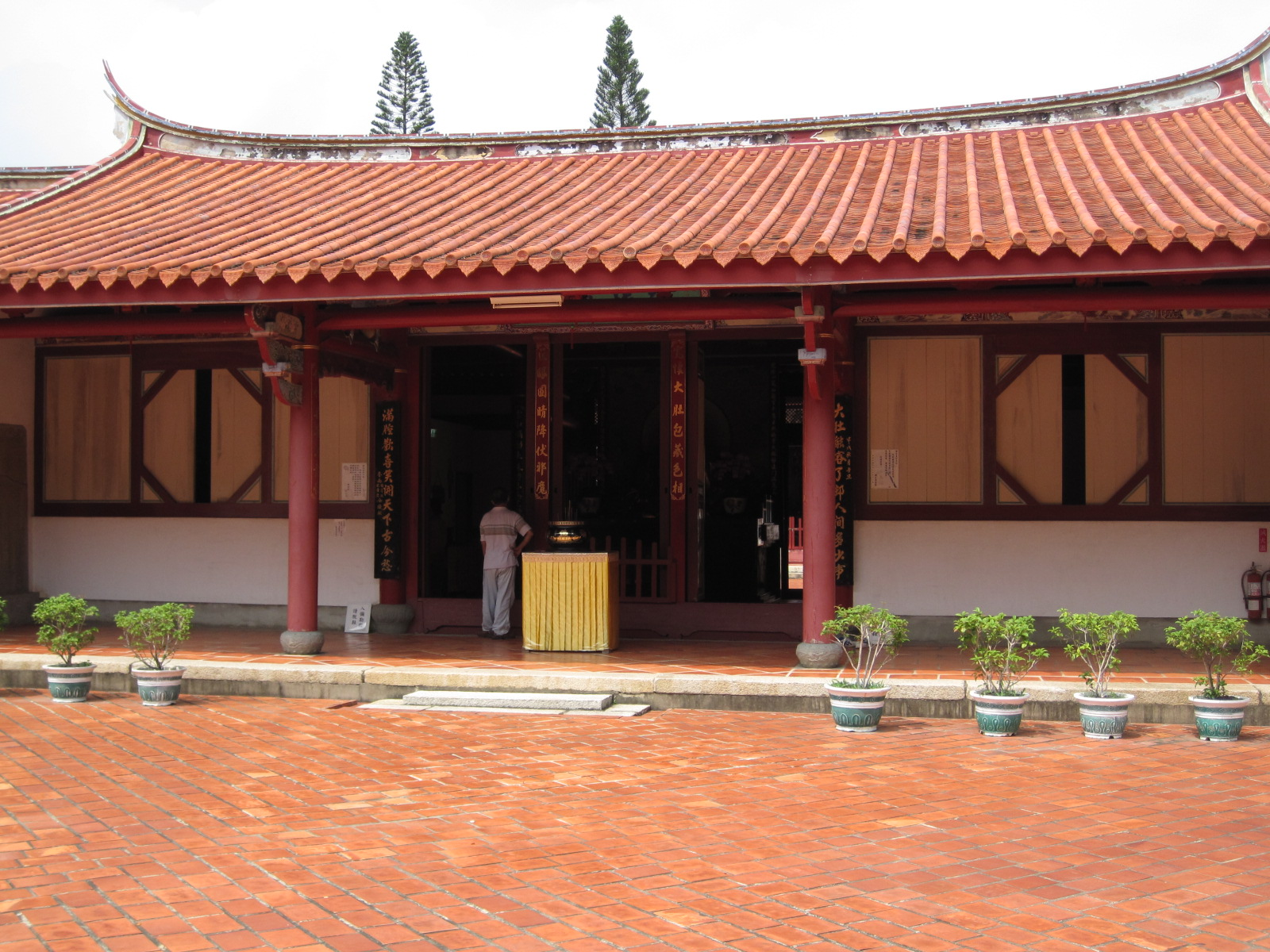
Mi Le Hall

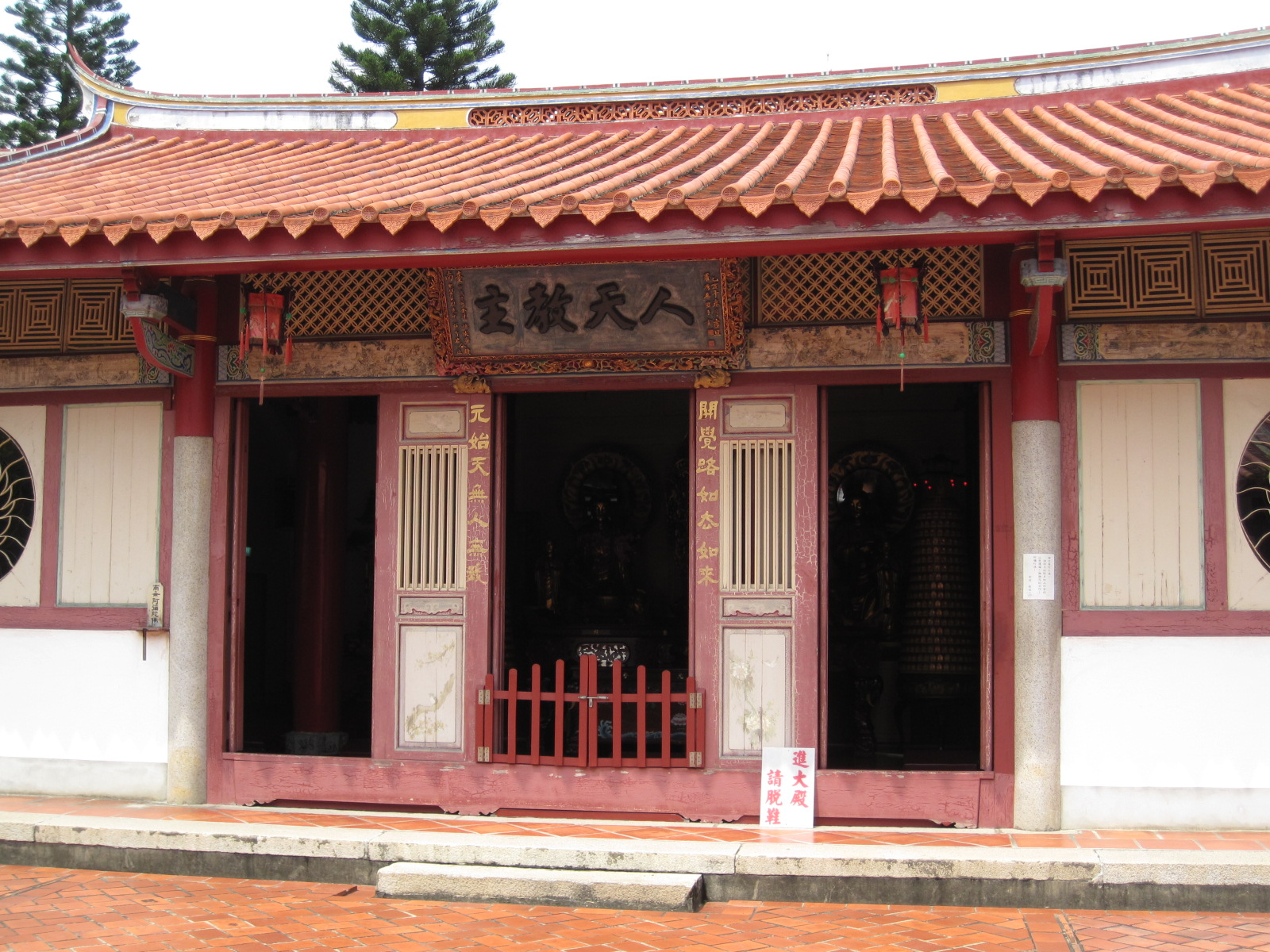
Daxiongbao Hall

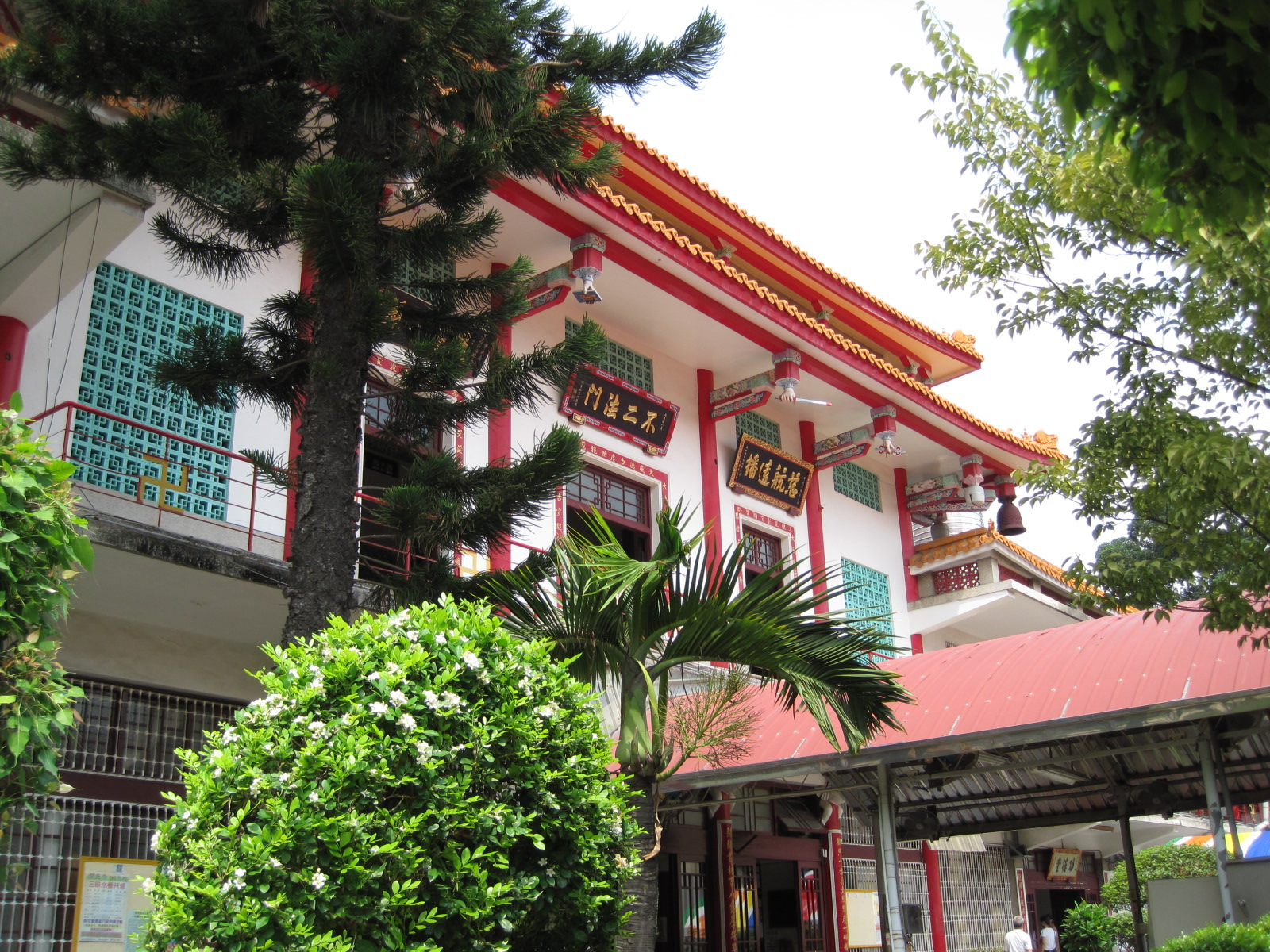
Dashi Hall

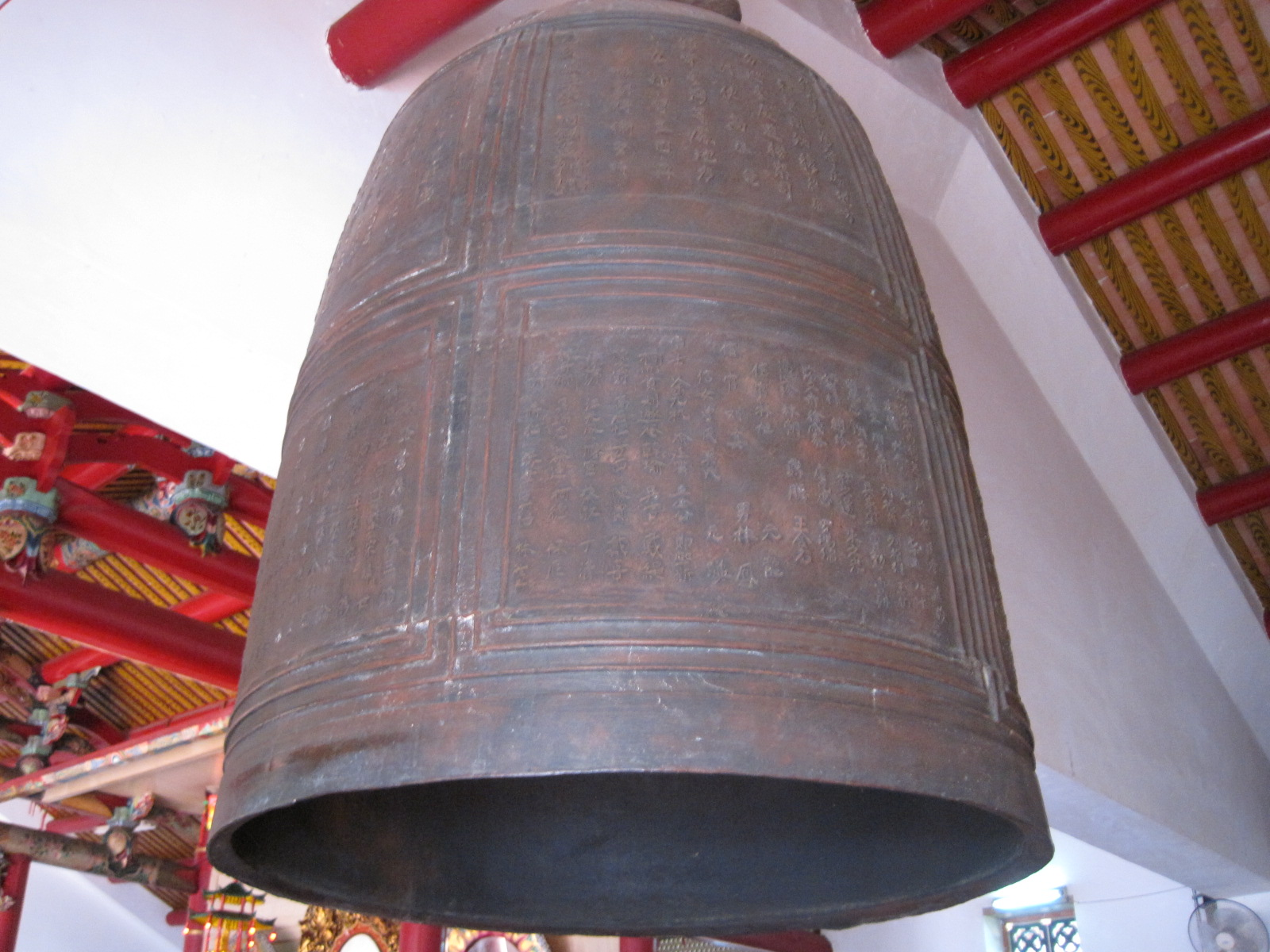
The bell inside Daxiongbao Hall, which is the oldest bell in Taiwan.

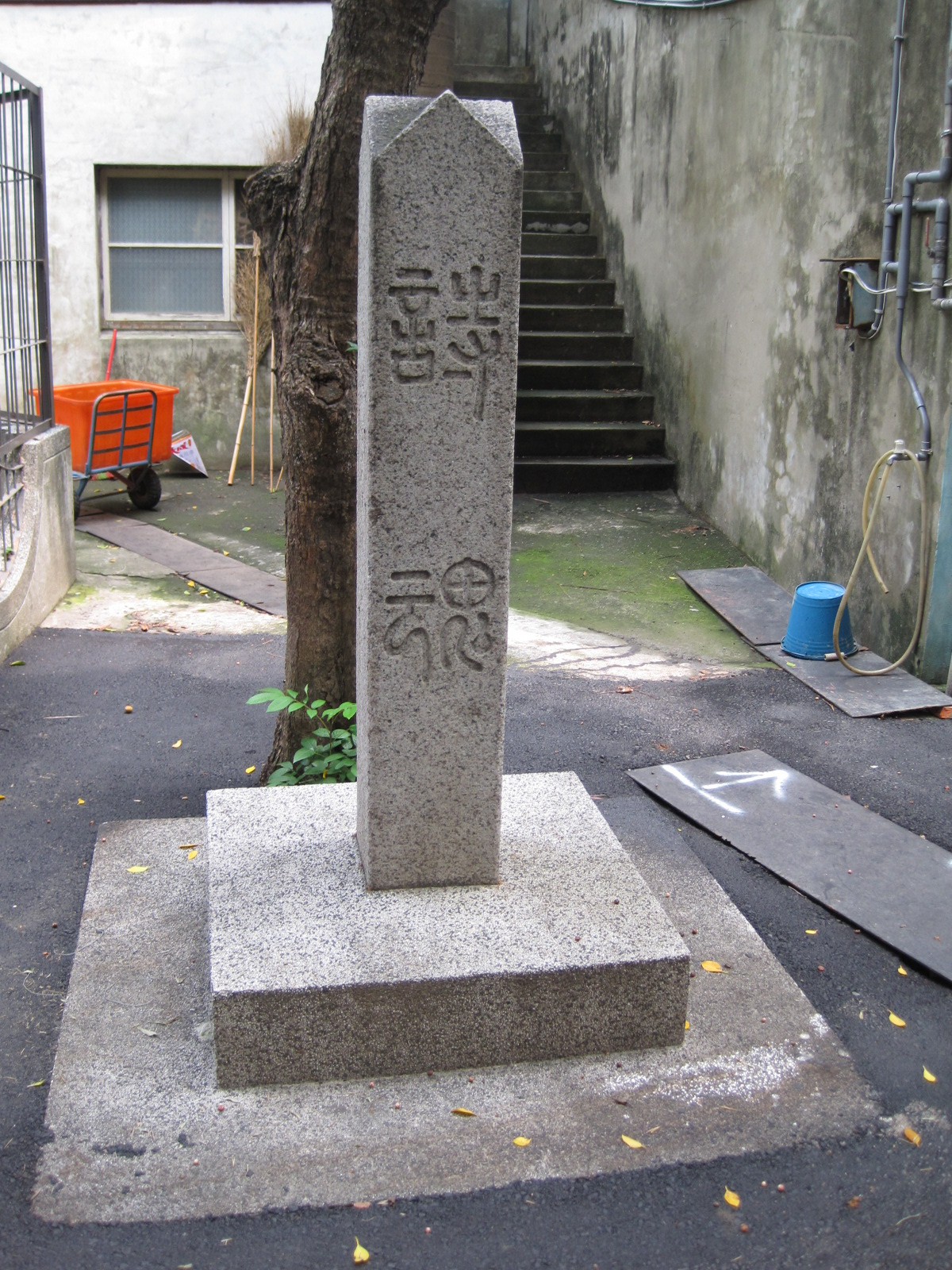
A stone memorial left behind by Nanshe. The text translates to "poetry spirit".

== See also ==
- Buddhism in Taiwan
- List of temples in Taiwan
