= Yiyuan Subdistrict, Daqing =

Yiyuan Subdistrict 怡园街道
- Subdistrict
- Location in Heilongjiang
- Coordinates: 46°16′7″N 124°53′43″E
- Country: People's Republic of China
- Province: Heilongjiang
- Prefecture-level city: Daqing
- District: Ranghulu District
- Time zone: UTC+8 (China Standard)

Yiyuan Subdistrict (simplified Chinese: 怡园街道; traditional Chinese: 怡園街道; pinyin: Yíyuán Jiēdào) is a subdistrict in Ranghulu District, Daqing, Heilongjiang, China. As of 2023, it administers five residential communities:

- Yiyuan Community
- Leyuan Community (乐园社区)
- Longqing Community (龙庆社区)
- Yueyuan Community (悦园社区)
- Qiyuan Community (憩园社区)

== See also ==
- List of township-level divisions of Heilongjiang
