= Yiyuan Subdistrict, Weihai =

Yiyuan Subdistrict 怡园街道
- Subdistrict
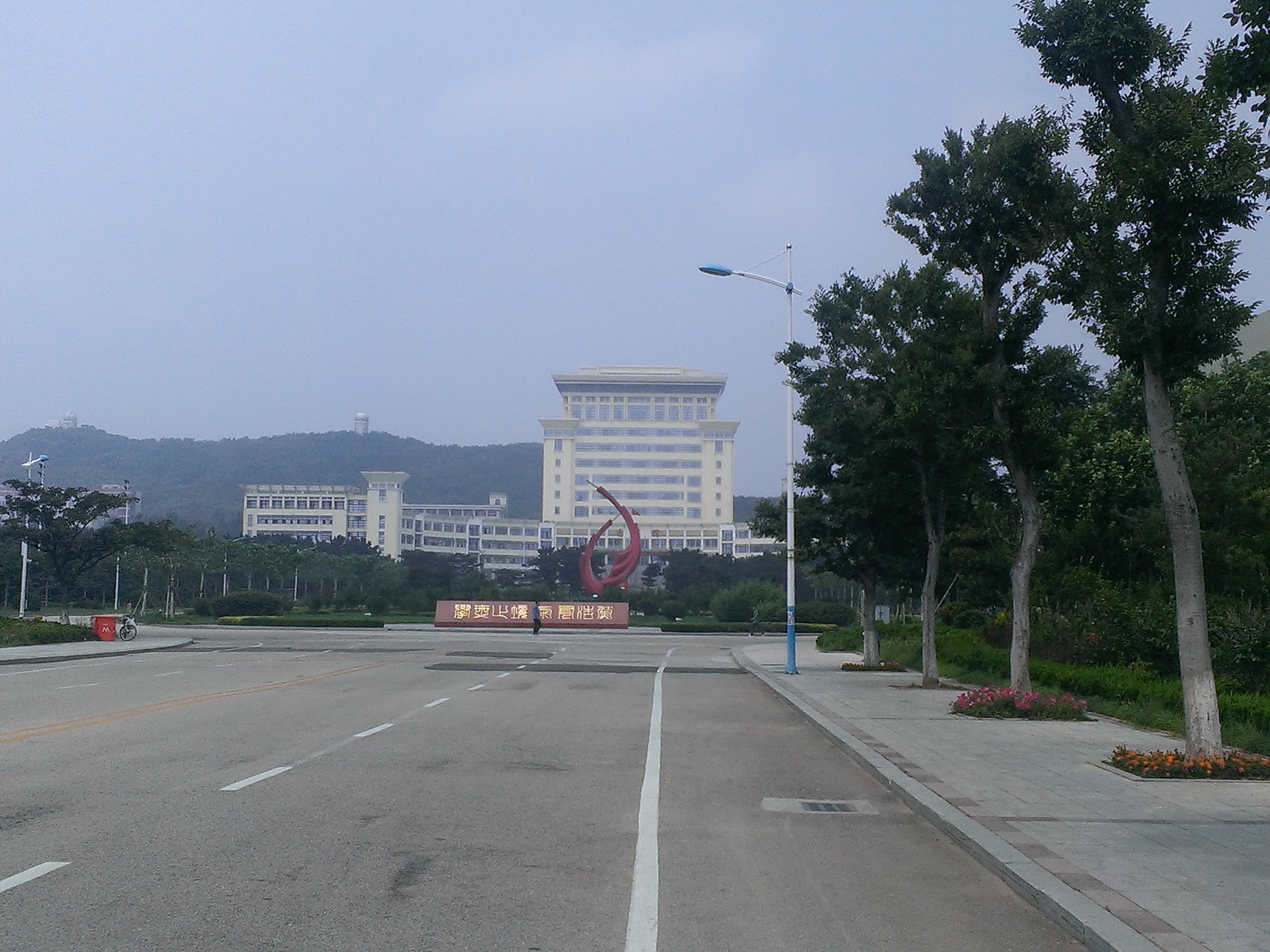
- Shandong University Weihai Campus

- Location in Shandong
- Coordinates: 37°31′36″N 122°3′48″E
- Country: People's Republic of China
- Province: Shandong
- Prefecture-level city: Weihai
- District: Torch Hi-tech Industrial Development Zone
- Time zone: UTC+8 (China Standard)

Yiyuan Subdistrict (simplified Chinese: 怡园街道; traditional Chinese: 怡園街道; pinyin: Yíyuán Jiēdào) is a subdistrict in Torch Hi-tech Industrial Development Zone (火炬高技术产业开发区), Weihai, Shandong, China. As of 2023, it administers Xiqin Village (西钦村) and the following 38 residential communities:

- Jinhaiwan (金海湾)
- Yihaiyuan (怡海园)
- Binzhoujie (Binzhou Street; 滨州街)
- Donglaotai (东涝台)
- Anhe Community (安和社区)
- Wolongshan (卧龙山)
- Aolin (奥林)
- Hengtaijie (Hengtai Street; 恒泰街)
- Taoyuan (桃园)
- Zhaibei (寨北)
- Bijiatuan (毕家疃)
- Xilaotai (西涝台)
- Shendaokou (神道口)
- Xibeishan (西北山)
- Qingzhoujie Community (Qingzhou Street Community; 青州街社区)
- Zhongshengyuan Community (中盛园社区)
- Houfengxi (后峰西)
- Yunhai Community (云海社区)
- Guanhai Community (观海社区)
- Huaiyun (槐云)
- Qin'an Community (钦安社区)
- Linhai Community (林海社区)
- Xingye Community (兴业社区)
- Gushan Community (古山社区)
- Taihe Community (泰和社区)
- Changchunlu Community (Chanchun Road Community; 长春路社区)
- Lijing Community (丽景社区)
- Duodingshan Community (垛顶山社区)
- Miaoshan Community (苗山社区)
- Fujin Community (福锦社区)
- Hengruijie Community (Hengrui Street Community; 恒瑞街社区)
- Majiashan Community (玛伽山社区)
- Anshanlu Community (Anshan Road Community; 鞍山路社区)
- Hanhai Community (瀚海社区)
- Qidingshan Community (祈顶山社区)
- Anhai Community (安海社区)
- Harbin Institute of Technology Weihai Campus
- Shandong University Weihai Campus

== See also ==
- List of township-level divisions of Shandong
