= Daodong Tutorial Academy =

Former tutorial academy in Hemei, Changhua County, Taiwan

Daodong Tutorial Academy 道東書院
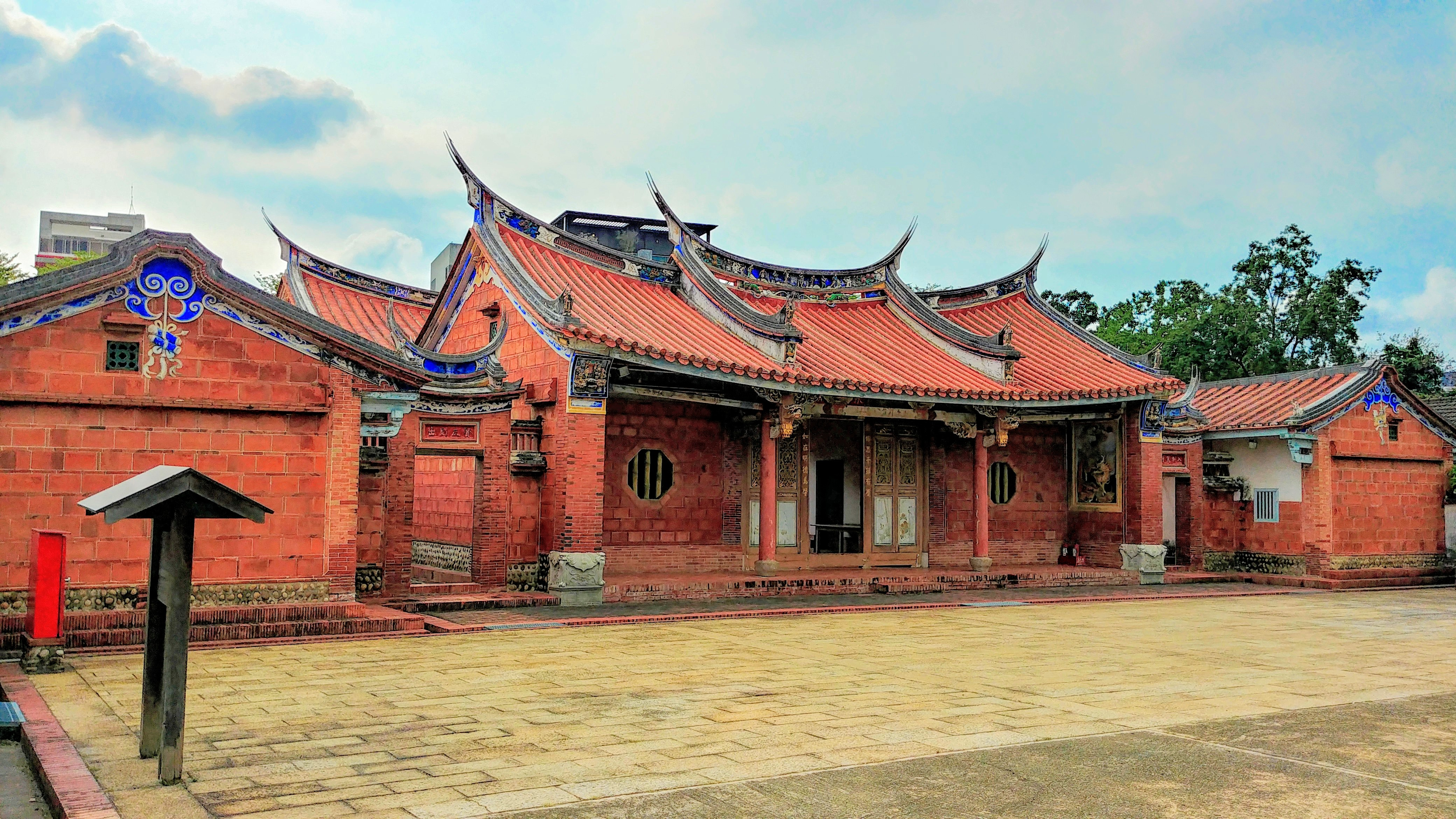

Location
- Hemei, Changhua County, Taiwan
- Coordinates: 24°06′41.4″N 120°29′37.3″E

Information
- Type: former academy
- Established: 1857

Daodong Tutorial Academy (traditional Chinese: 道東書院; simplified Chinese: 道东书院; pinyin: Dàodōng Shūyuàn) is a former tutorial academy during the Qing Dynasty rule of Taiwan in Hemei Township, Changhua County, Taiwan.

== History ==
The academy was founded in 1857. Recently, the building underwent renovation; the pillars and columns were replaced and the façade was restored to its original look.

== Architecture ==
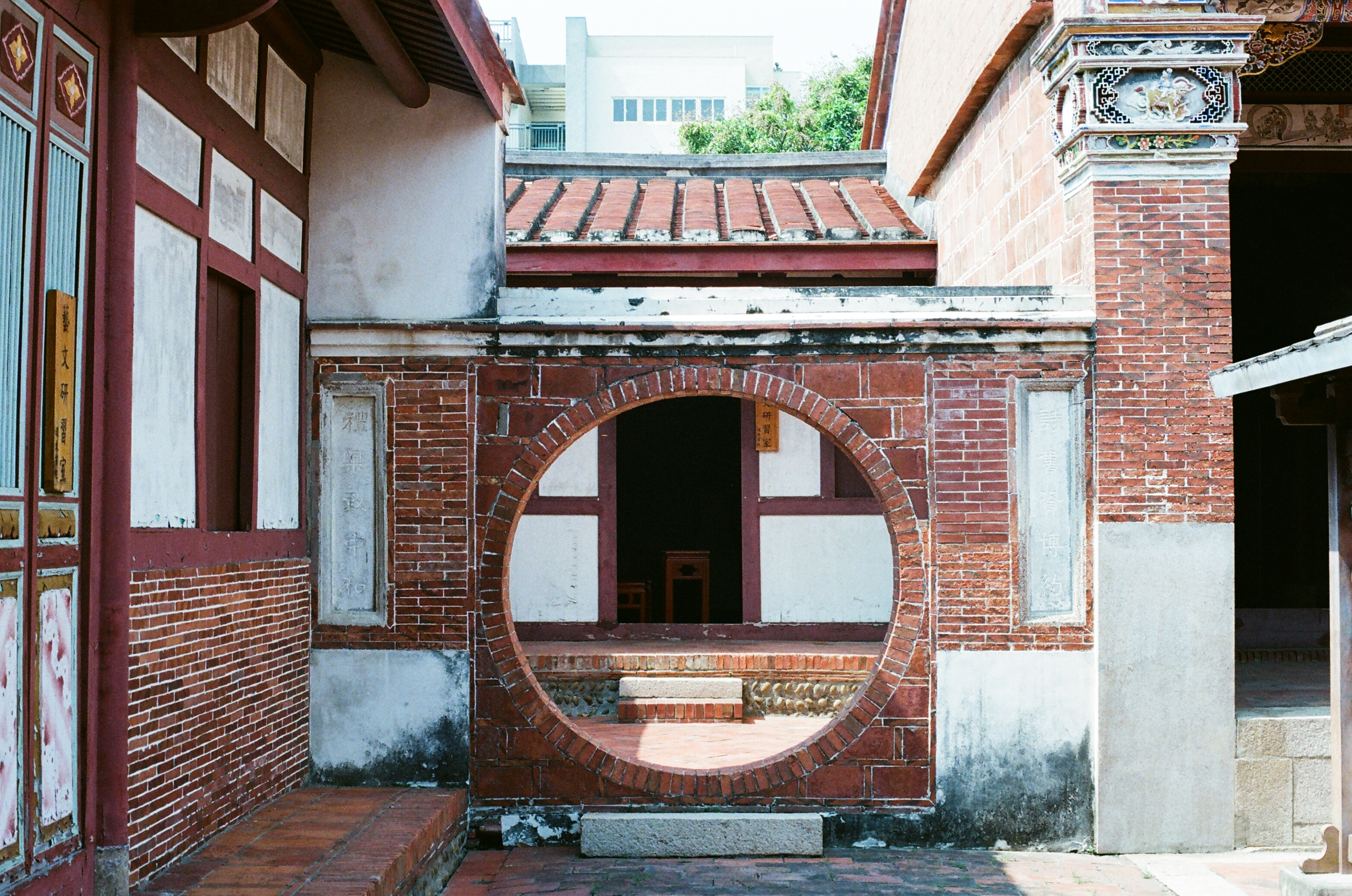
The west wing of Daodong Tutorial Academy

The academy building consists of a central hall, east wing, west wing, and a garden. The central hall enshrines Chu Wen-kung and Kuei Hsing; the east wing enshrines the tablets of temple renovation contributors; and the west wing enshrines the God of the Land. The garden displays wooden logs used for the construction of the academy.

== See also ==
- List of tourist attractions in Taiwan
