= Bureau of Cultural Heritage =

Republic of China government agency

- 文化部文化資產局
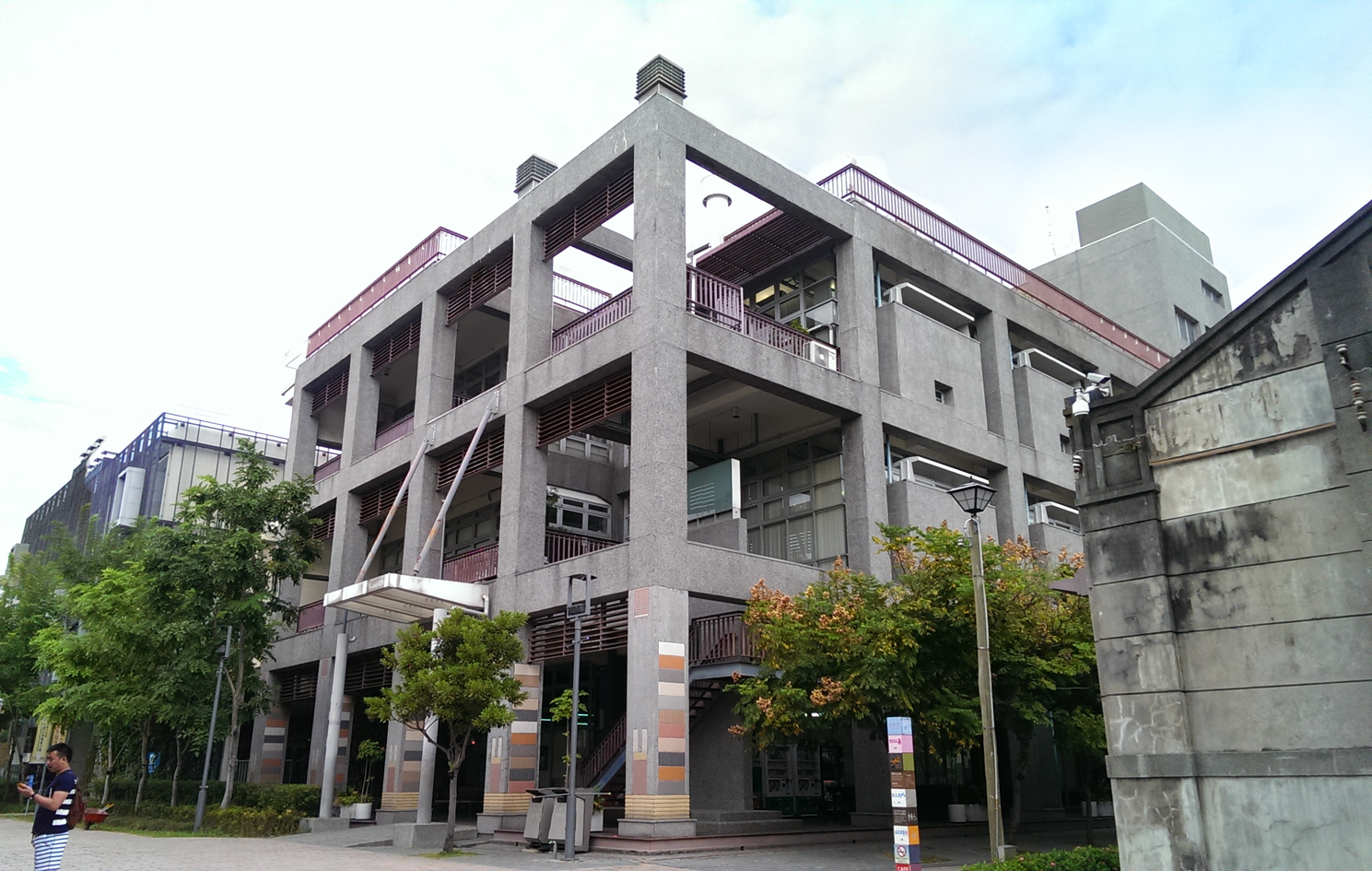

Agency overview
- Formed: 1 October 2007 (as Headquarters Administration of Cultural Heritage)
- Preceding agency: Headquarters Administration of Cultural Heritage
- Headquarters: South, Taichung, Taiwan; 24.133347°N 120.680780°E
- Agency executive: Shy Gwo-long, Director
- Parent agency: Ministry of Culture
- Website: www.boch.gov.tw

The Bureau of Cultural Heritage (BOCH; Chinese: 文化部文化資產局; pinyin: Wénhuàbù Wénhuà Zīchǎnjú) is a unit of the Taiwanese Ministry of Culture responsible for preserving and restoring historic buildings, sites, communities, relics and cultural landscapes, as well as conserving traditional arts, folk culture and other cultural legacies of Taiwan.

== History ==
The bureau was originally established as Headquarters Administration of Cultural Heritage on 1 October 2007 under the Council for Cultural Affairs (CCA). On 20 May 2012, the CCA was upgraded to the Ministry of Culture and Headquarters Administration of Cultural Heritage was upgraded to Bureau of Cultural Heritage.

== Organizational structures ==
- Division of General Planning
- Division of Monuments and Settlements
- Division of Antiquities and Archaeological Sites
- Division of Traditional Arts and Folklore
- Institute of Cultural Heritage Research Preservation
- Secretariat
- Office of Budget, Accounting and Statistics
- Civil Service Ethics Office
- Personnel Office

== Branches ==
The bureau operates a cultural heritage research center located at National Museum of Taiwan Literature in Tainan.

== See also ==
- Culture of Taiwan
- List of national monuments of Taiwan
