= Yi Yuan Mansion =

Former residence in Xiushui, Changhua County, Taiwan

- 馬興陳宅
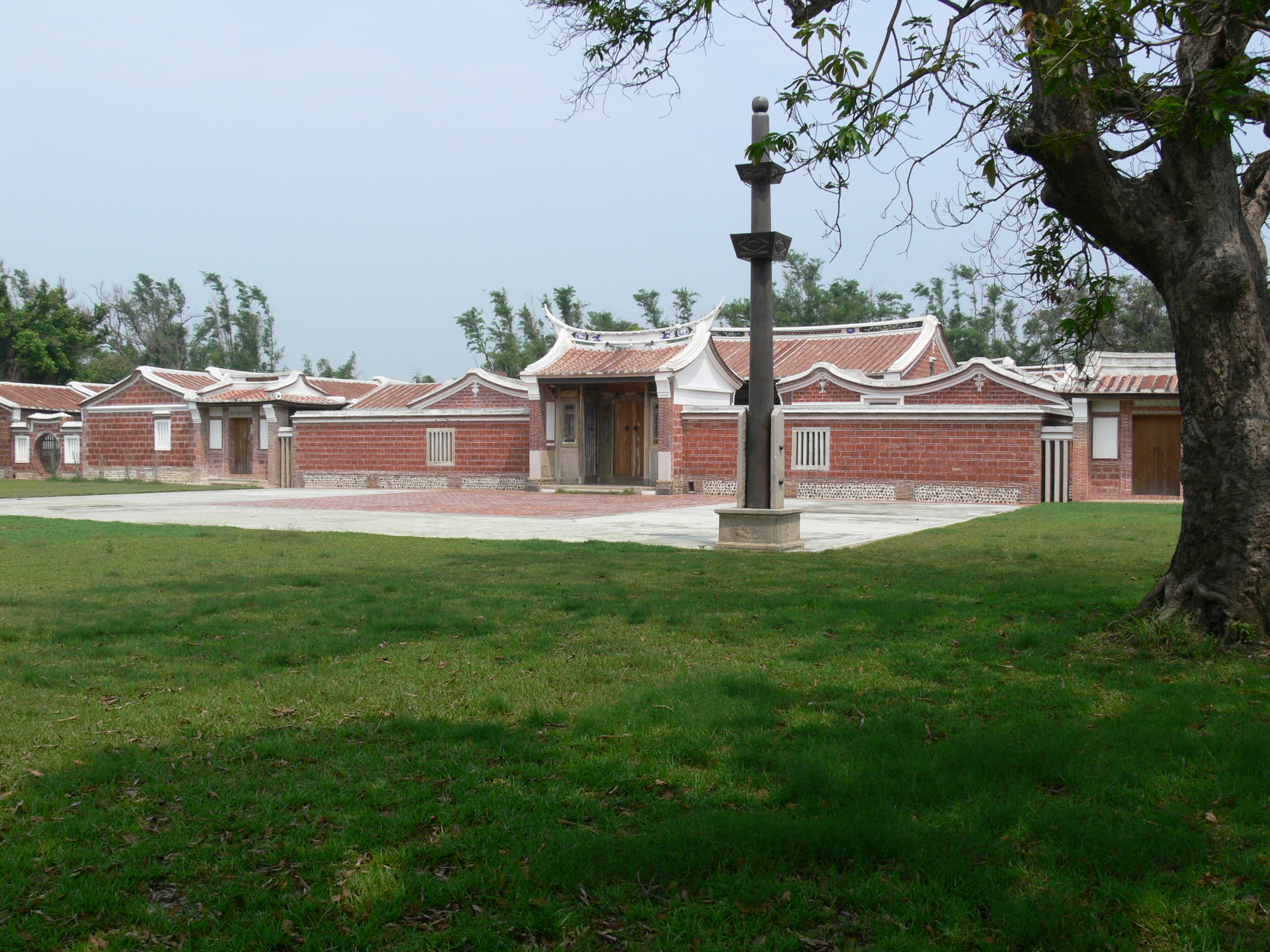
- Interactive map of the Yi Yuan Mansion area

General information
- Type: former house
- Location: Xiushui, Changhua County, Taiwan
- Coordinates: 24°3′49.9″N 120°29′44.6″E
- Completed: 1846

Design and construction
- Developer: Chen Family

The Yi Yuan Mansion or Maxing Chen Yi-Yuan Family Mansion (traditional Chinese: 馬興陳宅; simplified Chinese: 马兴陈宅; pinyin: Mǎxìng Chén Zhái) is a historical house in Xiushui Township, Changhua County, Taiwan. It is the largest old mansion in the county.

== History ==
The mansion was built in 1846 by the Chen Family, featuring 3 halls, 6 wing rooms, and over 90 rooms. The compound consists of outer courtyard, gatehouse, front courtyard, front gate, atrium, sedan chair hall, main hall, backyard, and rear hall, occupying nearly one hectare of land.

== See also ==
- List of tourist attractions in Taiwan
