= Xiushui, Changhua =

Rural township in Changhua County, Taiwan

Coordinates: 24°02′08.3″N 120°30′13.5″E

Xiushui Township 秀水鄉 Sioushuei
- Rural township
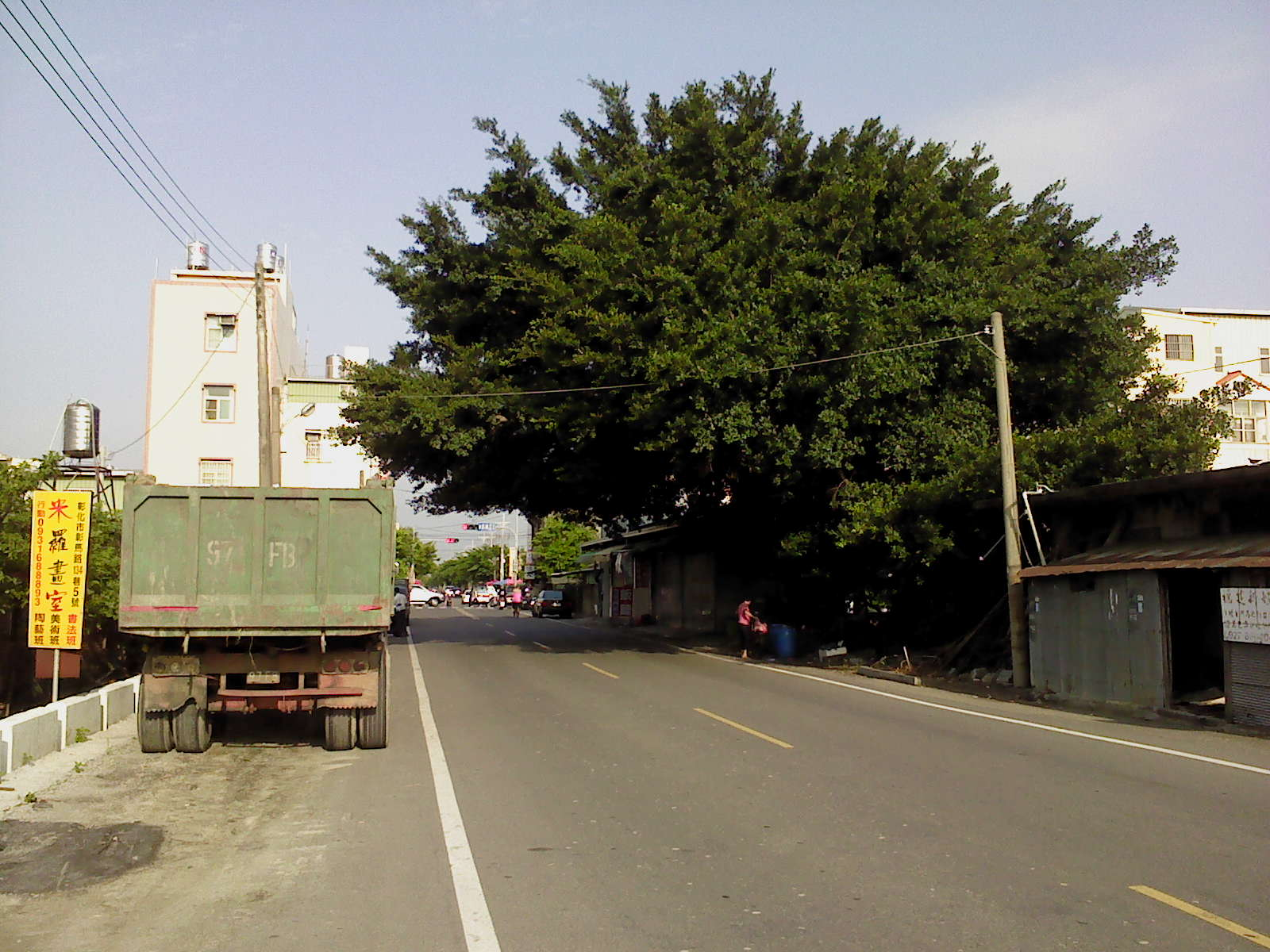

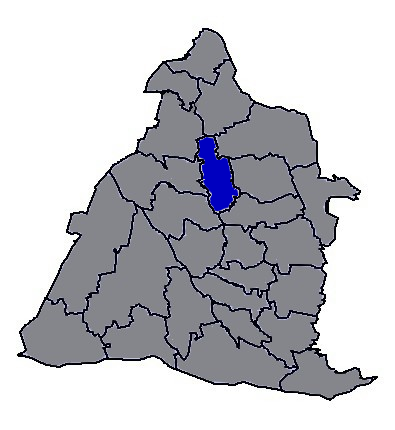
- Xiushui Township in Changhua County
- Location: Changhua County, Taiwan

Area
  - Total: 29.34 km^{2} (11.33 sq mi)

Population (January 2023)
  - Total: 38,248
  - Density: 1,304/km^{2} (3,376/sq mi)

Xiushui Township (Chinese: 秀水鄉; pinyin: Xiùshuǐ Xiāng, Wade-giles: Hsiushui) is a rural township in Changhua County, Taiwan. It has a population total of 38,248 as of January 2023 and an area of 29.34 square kilometres (11.33 sq mi).

== Administrative divisions ==
The township comprises 14 villages: Antung, Anxi, Fuan, Heming, Jinling, Jinxing, Maxing, Pulun, Shanxi, Xialun, Xiushui, Yixing, Zengcuo, and Zhuangya.

== Tourist attractions ==
- Yi Yuan Mansion

== Notable natives ==
- Wang Huei-mei, Magistrate of Changhua County
