= Chiang Kai-shek =

Leader of the Republic of China from 1928 to 1975

- 蔣介石
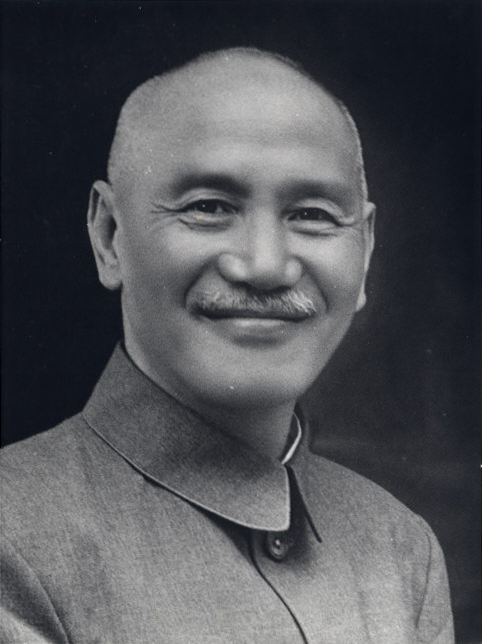
- Official portrait, 1955

1st President of the Republic of China
- In office 1 March 1950 – 5 April 1975
- Premier: Yan Xishan; Chen Cheng; Yu Hung-chun; Yen Chia-kan; Chiang Ching-kuo
- Vice President: Li Zongren; Chen Cheng; Yen Chia-kan
- Vice Chairman: Sun Fo
- Preceded by: Li Zongren (acting)
- Succeeded by: Yen Chia-kan
- In office 10 October 1928 – 15 December 1931
- Premier: Tan Yankai; T. V. Soong
- Preceded by: Tan Yankai
- Succeeded by: Lin Sen

Chairman of the National Government of China
- In office 1 August 1943 (Note: Acting: 1 August – 10 October 1943) – 20 May 1948
- Premier: T. V. Soong
- Preceded by: Lin Sen
- Succeeded by: Position abolished
- In office 20 May 1948 – 21 January 1949
- Premier: Zhang Qun; Weng Wenhao; Sun Fo
- Vice President: Li Zongren
- Preceded by: Position established
- Succeeded by: Li Zongren (acting)
Additional positions
Premier of the National Government
In office 1 March 1947 – 18 April 1947
President	Himself
Vice Premier	Weng Wenhao
Preceded by	T. V. Soong
In office 20 November 1939 – 31 May 1945
President	Lin Sen
Vice Premier	H. H. Kung
Preceded by	H. H. Kung
Succeeded by	T. V. Soong
In office 9 December 1935 – 1 January 1938
President	Lin Sen
Vice Premier	H. H. Kung
Preceded by	Wang Jingwei
Succeeded by	H. H. Kung
In office 4 December 1930 – 15 December 1931
President	Himself
Vice Premier	T. V. Soong
Preceded by	T. V. Soong
Succeeded by	Chen Mingshu (acting)
Chairman of the Kuomintang
In office 12 May 1936 – 1 April 1938
Preceded by	Hu Hanmin
Succeeded by	Himself as Director-General
In office 6 July 1926 – 11 March 1927
Preceded by	Zhang Renjie
Succeeded by	Wu Zhihui and Li Shizeng
Director-General of the Kuomintang
In office 1 April 1938 – 5 April 1975
Deputy	Wang Jingwei; Chen Cheng
Preceded by	Position established
Succeeded by	Chiang Ching-kuo

Personal details
- Born: Chiang Jui-yuan; 31 October 1887 Xikou, Zhejiang, China
- Died: 5 April 1975 (aged 87) Taipei, Taiwan
- Resting place: Cihu Mausoleum
- Party: Kuomintang
- Spouses: Mao Fumei (m. 1901; div. 1921) Yao Yecheng (concubine) (m. 1913–1927) Chen Jieru (m. 1921–1927) Soong Mei-ling (m. 1927)
- Relations: Chiang family
- Children: Chiang Ching-kuo; Chiang Wei-kuo (adopted)
- Education: Baoding Military Academy; Tokyo Shinbu Gakko
- Nicknames: "Generalissimo"; "Red General"; "Big Gun"; "The Napoleon of China"; "General Cash-My-Check"

Military service
- Allegiance: Empire of Japan; Republic of China
- Branch/service: Imperial Japanese Army; National Revolutionary Army; Republic of China Army
- Years of service: 1909–1975
- Rank: Generalissimo (Note: traditional Chinese: 特級上將; simplified Chinese: 特级上将; pinyin: tèjíshàngjiàng)
- Battles/wars: Xinhai Revolution; Northern Expedition; Central Plains War; Sino-Tibetan War; Kumul Rebellion; Soviet invasion of Xinjiang; Chinese Civil War; Second Sino-Japanese War; Kuomintang Islamic insurgency
- Chiang's voice Portion of Chiang's speech on the end of World War II in Asia; Recorded 1945
Chinese names
Chinese name
- Traditional Chinese: 蔣介石
- Simplified Chinese: 蒋介石
Transcriptions
Standard Mandarin
- Hanyu Pinyin: Jiǎng Jièshí
- Bopomofo: ㄐㄧㄤˇ ㄐㄧㄝˋ ㄕˊ
- Gwoyeu Romatzyh: Jeang Jiehshyr
- Wade–Giles: Chiang^{3} Chieh^{4}-shih^{2}
- Tongyong Pinyin: Jiǎng Jiè-shíh
- IPA: [tɕjàŋ tɕjê.ʂɻ̩̌]
Yue: Cantonese
- Yale Romanization: Jéung Gaai-sehk
- Jyutping: Zoeng2 gaai3 sek6
- Hong Kong Romanisation: Cheung Kai-shek
- IPA: [tsœŋ˧˥ kaj˧ sɛk̚˨]
Southern Min
- Hokkien POJ: Chiúⁿ Kài-se̍k
Register name
- Traditional Chinese: 蔣周泰
- Simplified Chinese: 蒋周泰
Transcriptions
Standard Mandarin
- Hanyu Pinyin: Jiǎng Zhōutài
- Bopomofo: ㄐㄧㄤˇ ㄓㄡ ㄊㄞˋ
- Gwoyeu Romatzyh: Jeang Joutay
- Wade–Giles: Chiang^{3} Chou^{1}-tʻai^{4}
- Tongyong Pinyin: Jiǎng Jhou-tài
- IPA: [tɕjàŋ ʈʂóʊ.tʰâɪ]
Yue: Cantonese
- Jyutping: Zoeng2 zau1 taai3
- IPA: [tsœŋ˧˥.tsɐw˥ tʰaj˧]
Southern Min
- Hokkien POJ: Chiúⁿ Chiu-thài
Milk name
- Traditional Chinese: 蔣瑞元
- Simplified Chinese: 蒋瑞元
Transcriptions
Standard Mandarin
- Hanyu Pinyin: Jiǎng Ruìyuán
- Bopomofo: ㄐㄧㄤˇ ㄖㄨㄟˋ ㄩㄢˊ
- Gwoyeu Romatzyh: Jeang Ruey'yuan
- Wade–Giles: Chiang^{3} Jui^{4}-yüan^{2}
- Tongyong Pinyin: Jiǎng Ruèi-yuán
- IPA: [tɕjàŋ ɻwêɪ.ɥɛ̌n]
Yue: Cantonese
- Jyutping: Zoeng2 seoi6 jyun4
- IPA: [tsœŋ˧˥ sɵɥ˨ jyn˩]
Southern Min
- Hokkien POJ: Chiúⁿ Sūi-gôan
School name
- Traditional Chinese: 蔣志清
- Simplified Chinese: 蒋志清
Transcriptions
Standard Mandarin
- Hanyu Pinyin: Jiǎng Zhìqīng
- Bopomofo: ㄐㄧㄤˇ ㄓˋ ㄑㄧㄥ
- Gwoyeu Romatzyh: Jeang Jyhching
- Wade–Giles: Chiang^{3} Chih^{4}-chʻing^{1}
- Tongyong Pinyin: Jiǎng Jhìh-cing
- IPA: [tɕjàŋ ʈʂɻ̩̂.tɕʰíŋ]
Yue: Cantonese
- Jyutping: Zoeng2 zi3 cing1
- IPA: [tsœŋ˧˥ tsi˧ tsʰɪŋ˥]
Southern Min
- Hokkien POJ: Chiúⁿ Chì-chheng
Adopted name
- Traditional Chinese: 蔣中正
- Simplified Chinese: 蒋中正
Transcriptions
Standard Mandarin
- Hanyu Pinyin: Jiǎng Zhōngzhèng
- Bopomofo: ㄐㄧㄤˇ ㄓㄨㄥ ㄓㄥˋ
- Gwoyeu Romatzyh: Jeang Jongjenq
- Wade–Giles: Chiang^{3} Chung^{1}-cheng^{4}
- Tongyong Pinyin: Jiǎng Jhong-jhèng
- IPA: [tɕjàŋ ʈʂʊ́ŋ.ʈʂə̂ŋ]
Yue: Cantonese
- Yale Romanization: Jéung Jūng-jing
- Jyutping: Zoeng2 zung1 zing3
Southern Min
- Hokkien POJ: Chiúⁿ Tiong-chèng

Chiang Kai-shek (Note: See § Names. Chinese: 蔣介石; pinyin: Jiǎng Jièshí) (/ˈtʃæŋ kaɪˈʃɛk/; 31 October 1887 – 5 April 1975) was a Chinese military commander, revolutionary, and statesman who was the president of the Republic of China from 1948 to 1975 and the head of the Nationalist government from 1925 to 1948. As the de facto leader of the Republic of China (ROC), he ruled the country through World War II and oversaw the relocation of its government to Taiwan following defeat in the Chinese Civil War.

Born in Zhejiang, Chiang received a military education in China and Japan, joined Sun Yat-sen's Tongmenghui in 1908, and, after the 1911 Revolution, participated in the National Protection War. In 1923, he was appointed by Sun as chief of staff of the Army and Navy Marshal stronghold, and served as commandant of the Whampoa Military Academy from 1924 until its closure in 1930. After Sun's death, Chiang wrested control of the party and National Revolutionary Army from Wang Jingwei in the Canton Coup. From 1926 to 1928, Chiang led the Northern Expedition and largely unified China under a Nationalist government based in Nanjing. He broke the First United Front by purging Chinese Communist Party (CCP) members in the Shanghai massacre, triggering the Chinese Civil War.

During the Nanjing decade, Chiang pursued modernization of China while prioritizing the suppression of the Communists over confrontation with Japan following the latter's invasion of Manchuria. The Xi'an Incident in 1936 forced him to form a Second United Front with the CCP against Japan. Between 1937 and 1945, Chiang led China in the Second Sino-Japanese War, mostly from the wartime capital of Chongqing, resulting in a victory for the National Revolutionary Army. In 1943, Chiang attended the Cairo Conference to discuss the terms of Japan's surrender, including the retrocession of Taiwan, after which he suppressed the February 28 incident.

When World War II ended, the Chinese Civil War resumed. In 1949, Chiang's KMT was defeated by Mao Zedong's CCP and retreated to Taiwan. He imposed martial law and White Terror on the island that lasted until 1987 and 1992, respectively. Beginning in 1948, he was re-elected five times by the same Eternal Parliament with six-year terms as the president of the ROC, the head of a de facto one-party state, for 25 years until his death. Chiang presided over land reform, economic growth, and the Taiwan Strait crises twice in 1954–1955 and in 1958. Taiwan also pursued an ultimately unsuccessful nuclear weapons programme. Chiang was considered the legitimate leader of China by the United Nations until 1971, when the ROC's seat in the Security Council was transferred to the People's Republic of China.

Chiang is a controversial figure. Supporters credit him with unifying the nation and ending the century of humiliation, leading the resistance against Japan, fostering economic development and preserving Chinese culture in contrast to Mao's Cultural Revolution. He is also credited with safeguarding the Forbidden City's treasures during the wars, a substantial portion now housed at the Taipei Palace Museum. Critics fault him for his early appeasement of Japan, the deliberate flooding of the Yellow River, cronyism and corruption linked to the four big families, and authoritarian rule on both mainland China and Taiwan.

== Names ==
At the time of his birth, Chiang's grandfather chose for him a milk name, Chiang Jui-yuan (Chinese: 蔣瑞元; pinyin: Jiǎng Ruìyuán; lit. 'auspicious beginning'), containing the generation name rui (Chinese: 瑞; lit. 'auspicious'). His clan name was Chiang Chou-t'ai (蔣周泰; Jiǎng Zhōutài), meaning lit. 'completely peaceful' or lit. 'boundlessly great'.

In August 1903, Chiang, then 15 years old, chose a school name, Chih-ching (志清; Zhìqīng; 'striving to be honest'), to reflect his ambitions of passing the imperial examinations. In March 1912, by then already a revolutionary, he took on the name Chieh-shih (介石; Jièshí; 'firm as a rock')—a combination of the characters jie and shi from the ancient classic I Ching—and used it as a pen name. According to biographer Alexander Pantsov, when rendered in Cantonese, the name "sounds like Chiang Kai-shek, and that is how Jiang [sic] began to be called by that name from early 1918". It was also by the Cantonese pronunciation of this name that Sun Yat-sen knew him.

In 1917, Chiang assumed another name, Chiang Chung-cheng (蔣中正; Jiǎng Zhōngzhèng; 'central and correct'), which he took from the second line of the sixteenth hexagram of the I Ching: 不終日貞吉以中正也; Bù zhōngrì zhēnjí yǐ zhōngzhèng yě; '[He sees a thing] without waiting till it has come to pass', 'with his firm correctness there will be good fortune: this is shown by the central and correct position [of the line]'.

Chiang's best known titles include Commandant (Chinese: 校長; pinyin: Xiào Zhǎng; lit. 'principal', 'schoolmaster'), used among the alumni of the Whampoa Military Academy; "the Generalissimo" (Chinese: 蒋委員長; pinyin: Jiǎnɡ Wěi Yuán Zhǎng; lit. 'Chairman Chiang of the (Military Affairs) Commission') or "Gissimo" (Chinese: 委座; pinyin: Wěi Zuò; lit. 'Chairman'), used after 1926 when he became the commander in chief of the Nationalist armies.

== Early life, 1887–1906 ==
Chiang was born on 31 October 1887 to a distinguished family of merchants in Xikou, then a small village about 48.2 kilometers (30.0 mi) south of the port city of Ningbo. Both his father, Chiang Chao-tsung (1842–1895, also known as Chiang Shu-an), and his paternal grandfather, Chiang Ssu-chien (1814–1894) were salt-seller who ran the family business, the Yutai Salt Store, and was known for his honesty as a broker of village disputes. His mother, Wang Tsai-yu (1864–1921), was a seamstress, a devout Buddhist, and the daughter of a landlord, Wang Yu-tse (1820–1882). She was Chao-tsung's third wife; at the time of their marriage in 1886, Chao-tsung had a daughter, Chiang Ruichun, and a son, Chiang Ruisheng, from previous marriages. They were a wealthy family descended from the Duke of Zhou who possessed more than thirty mu of rice fields, bamboo groves, and tea bushes. Although salt and wine were state monopolies, Chao-tsung sold both, having obtained a license by means of guanxi. They moved out from the salt store into a new seven-room sanheyuan when Chiang was an infant. Chiang's sister Ruilian was born there in 1890, followed by another sister, Ruiju, in 1892 and a brother, Ruiqing, in 1894.

During his childhood, Chiang was described as "sprightly and prankish from disposition, but sickly in body," with a unique capacity for chasing, then escaping, difficult situations. At age three, he survived choking on a pair of chopsticks; in 1892, at age five, he narrowly avoided drowning in a man-sized water jar after climbing in. As a boy, he developed a fitness for swimming and hill-climbing and had a penchant for war games, in which he preferred to be the commander. At the behest of a relative, Chiang's mother committed him to a family tutor when he turned five, but he initially made slow progress in learning the Chinese classics taught to him.

When Chiang was seven years old, his paternal grandfather, Yu-piao, died of pneumonia. Months later, on 24 August 1895, Chiang's father died suddenly, at the age of 54. A property dispute left most of the family's estate with Chiang's half-brother Ruisheng, leaving a small parcel of land with Wang, who supported Chiang by weaving linen. Chiang later wrote in his diary in 1917: "After father died and my elder brother refused to take care of the family, everyone cheated us, and my mother quietly suffered, enduring trials and tribulations." In one instance, tax collectors pursued Wang and detained Chiang as collateral. Qing officials brought the boy Chiang before a magistrate's court under threat of imprisonment. Ultimately the sum was paid, but Chiang later referred to the experience as "the first spark that kindled my revolutionary fire."

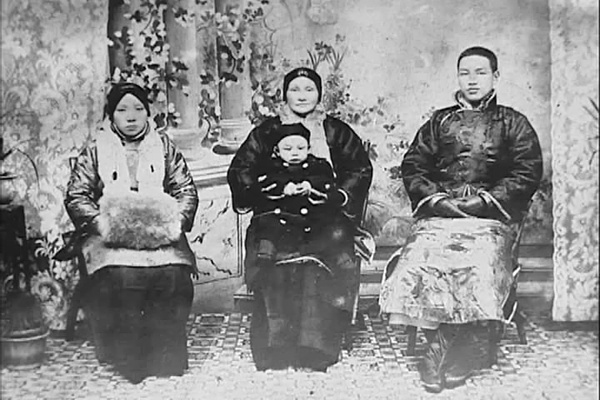
Chiang (right) with his mother, Wang Tsai-yu (middle), who holds his son, Chiang Ching-kuo. Chiang's then-wife, Mao Fumei, is seated left (1910)

In 1898, Ruiqing died at age four, which deeply affected Wang, who focused all of her attention on Chiang thereafter and accelerated his schooling. Chiang had learned to read and write while attending a private village school and, under strict teachers, studied the Four Books and Five Classics. At ten years old he wrote his first essay in Classical Chinese and dedicated it to Ruiqing. In 1899, he began attending a school near his maternal grandmother, where a teacher encouraged him to write short prose essays and verses. In 1901, the year of his arranged teenage marriage to Mao Fumei, Chiang transitioned to a mountain school in Fenghua, where he led a protest for better teaching and was nearly expelled. He spent another two years at a private school in Ningbo before returning to attend middle school in Fenghua, a school whose method of rote memorization of classical texts later influenced his mindset of issuing orders, which he believed were to be followed, and enunciated, in the same way as Confucian truths. One of his teachers, Mao Sicheng, was a distant in-law; under Mao's direction, Chiang studied the I Ching and wrote essays in the classical style. Mao later recalled:

He considered class a stage and his fellow students marionettes. He was wild and unrestrainable. But when he was answering at the board, reading, or clenching a writing brush in his hand and thinking over his answer, even thousands of voices around could not distract him from his profound concentration. He alternated between moments of calm and outbursts, sometimes in the course of several minutes. One might think there were two different persons. I found him very intriguing.

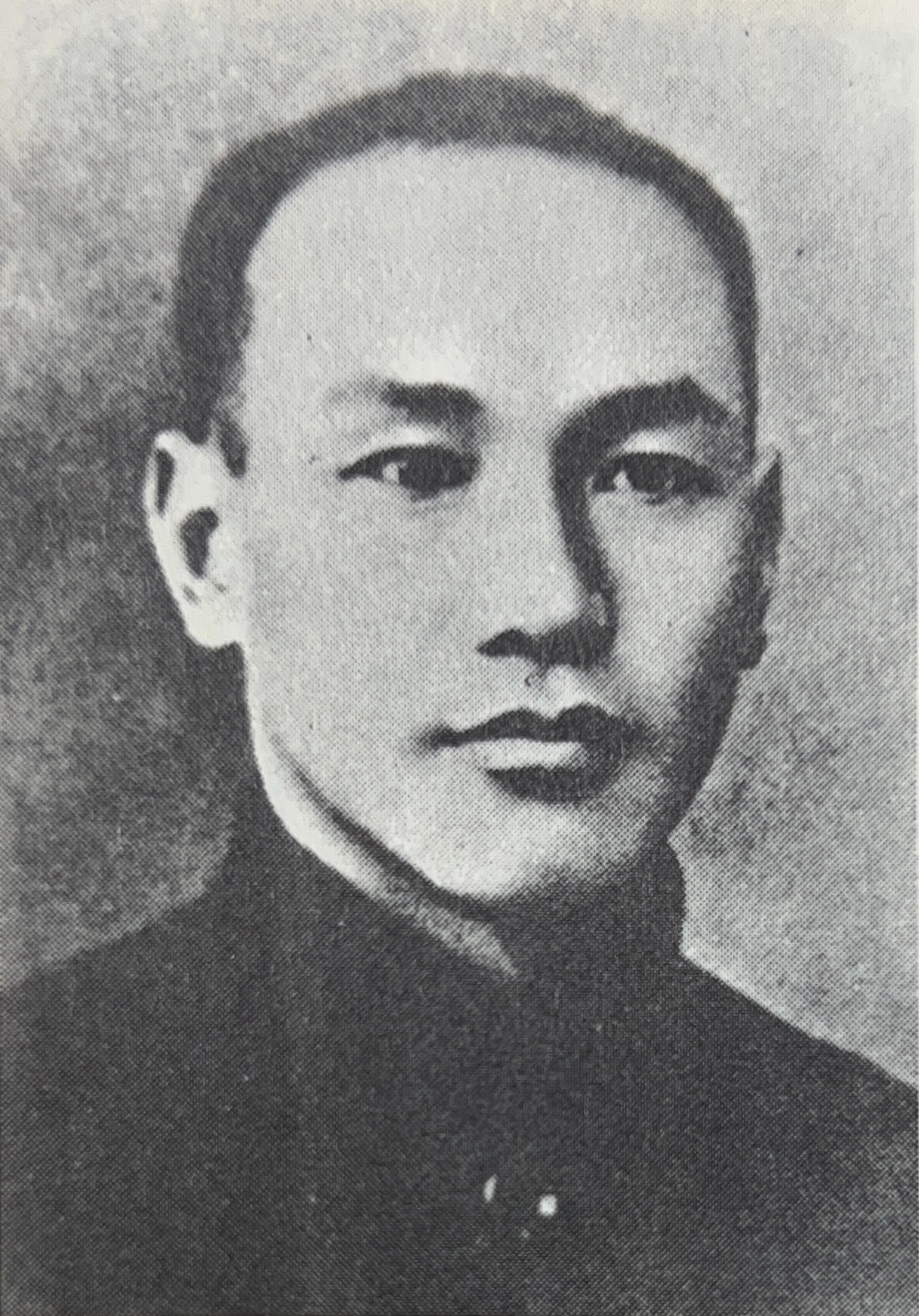
Chiang in 1906, shortly before leaving China to study in Japan

In August 1903, Chiang took the imperial examination at age 15 and sat for the xiucai degree, but, to his great disappointment, failed to pass. He felt the failure keenly and, for a time, isolated himself to intensify his studies to try for a second time. However, the examinations were abolished during the Late Qing reforms, so he moved to a new school in Fenghua which taught the classics, arithmetic, and English. After two years there, he moved again in the spring of 1905, this time to a school—called "Golden Arrow"—in Ningbo founded by Ku Ching-lien, a Japanese-educated pedagogue. Under Ku's tutelage, Chiang studied The Art of War, in addition to the works of Zeng Guofan and Wang Yangming. From Ku, he learned of plans to overthrow the Manchu-led Qing government and of the leader of one such revolutionary movement, Sun Yat-sen (then living in Tokyo), whose 1896 kidnapping in London by Qing officials had a pivotal influence on many young Chinese nationalists, including Chiang.

Urged by Ku to study abroad, Chiang sought to continue his schooling in Japan, ideally at a military academy. He spent a few more months studying English in Fenghua under Hollington Tong, whom he later chose as his biographer, then abruptly withdrew from school in April 1906. He wrote in his diaries:

I decided to go abroad because I suffered from the decline of my country and the degradation of the Manchus. Moreover, I experienced orphanhood and the bitter situation of my family, which was deceived and insulted. I very much wanted to rise up and show everyone my own strength.

Before boarding a passenger liner bound for Japan in May 1906, Chiang cut off his queue—the required Qing hairstyle of men and a symbol of submission to the ruling Manchu dynasty—and had it sent home from school, a criminal act which shocked the people in his hometown.

== Military education, 1906–1910 ==
Chiang chose to settle in Tokyo due to its reputation as the center of Japanese military science and for the opportunity to fraternize with the city's exiled Chinese revolutionaries. A year earlier, in 1905, the Japanese government issued a proclamation forbidding Chinese students from studying in the country if they lacked an official recommendation, so Chiang enrolled in the Qinghua School in the Ushigome neighborhood of Tokyo; founded by Liang Qichao in 1899, it was the only school open to Chinese "from the street". While living among the city's Chinese community, he studied the Japanese language and paid for courses out-of-pocket. He formed a close friendship with Chen Qimei, a fellow student in Japan also from Zhejiang, and the two became inseparable blood brothers.

Through Chen, a member of Sun Yat-sen's underground Tongmenghui, Chiang learned of Sun's political philosophy, the Three Principles of the People. The Tongmenghui had been formed in Tokyo on 20 August 1905 with Sun as president, and espoused socialist and occasionally communist views, advocating for a democratic state with harmony among all social classes. When Sun returned to Tokyo at the end of 1906, 19-year-old Chiang went with Chen to meet him for the first time at the apartment of Tōten Miyazaki in either November or December. Although no records of the meeting survive, sources present indicated that Chiang kept silent but made a positive impression on Sun, who valued obeisance and thoughtfulness. Sun told Chen after the meeting, "That man [Chiang] will be the hero of our Revolution: we need just such a man in our revolutionary movement."

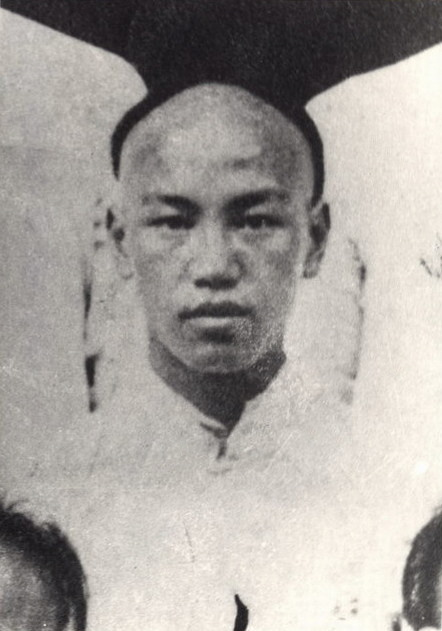
Chiang in 1907, a student at the Baoding Military Academy

On 25 January 1907, Chiang's sister Ruilian was married, and Chiang sailed home to attend the ceremony, ending his first stay in Japan. Next month, he went to Hangzhou, intending to sit the entrance examinations for the Baoding Military Academy, one of best educational institutions in China at the time. The academy reserved only fourteen spaces for new cadets from Zhejiang, with approximately 70 prospective applicants for each space; although ill on the day of the exam, Chiang won a competitive space and enrolled in a six-month accelerated program there in the summer of 1907. He was one of a few successful applicants from the province, despite being disadvantaged for being Han Chinese (non-Manchu) and for having short hair.

At Baoding, Chiang was a diligent student, but sometimes chafed against the academy's officers, most of whom were Japanese. During a lecture on hygiene, he confronted a Japanese officer who used an analogy comparing the Chinese population to microbes on a clod of earth he held, after which Chiang struck the piece down and used the same analogy to describe the population of Japan as microbes on the resulting fragments. Afterwards, the officer reported Chiang for disorderly conduct—an expellable offense—to the academy's superiors, but he ultimately escaped with only a reprimand, as the chancellor of the academy was sympathetic to his nationalism.

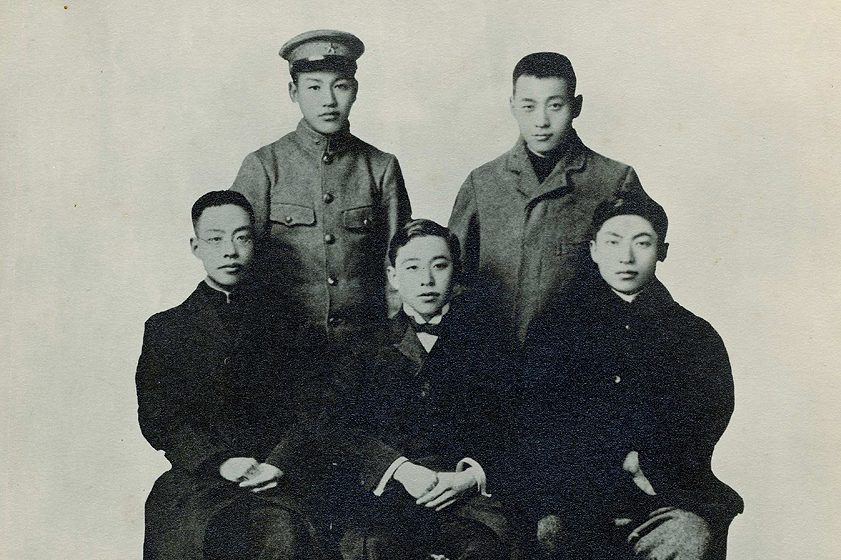
Chiang (top left) with other Chinese classmates in Japan, 1910

In the beginning of 1908, the academy held an exam to select a group of cadets to further their education in Japan. Because Chiang was not enrolled in a Japanese-language course, he did not initially qualify and had to petition the head of the academy, who granted Chiang's request that he be considered for having prior studied the language. Chiang, one of the 40 chosen after graduation, received a letter of recommendation to attend Tokyo Shinbu Gakko, a preparatory military school in Tokyo co-founded by the Chinese government to service Chinese cadets. He enrolled there in March 1908, as a member of its 11th class. The curriculum emphasized history, geography, natural sciences, and drawing, with particularly intense courses in Japanese and mathematics. Among his classmates were He Yingqin and Zhang Qun, whom Chiang later named as ministers of military administration and foreign affairs, respectively. He graduated 55th in his class of 62 in November 1910.

== Revolutionary years, 1908–1916 ==
A lethal vapor enshrouds the planet,
We are weak now, with much work to do!
I must revive our sacred country,
Why, then, am I living like a baron in Tokyo?

— "Formulating a Goal," a poem written by Chiang during his stay in Japan

Recommended by Chen Qimei and endorsed by two other revolutionary friends, Chiang was inducted into the Tongmenghui in a secret ceremony while in Japan and swore an oath of allegiance to the Three Principles of the People in 1908. In the next two years, revolutionaries under Sun Yat-sen launched at least seven armed rebellions with the goal of igniting a revolution to overthrow the Manchu government—all of which proved unsuccessful. Chiang made repeated efforts to join the cause but was turned away to focus on his education, recalling that "great hopes were placed upon me as a future warrior, therefore my comrades did not allow me [for now] to take part in military operations."

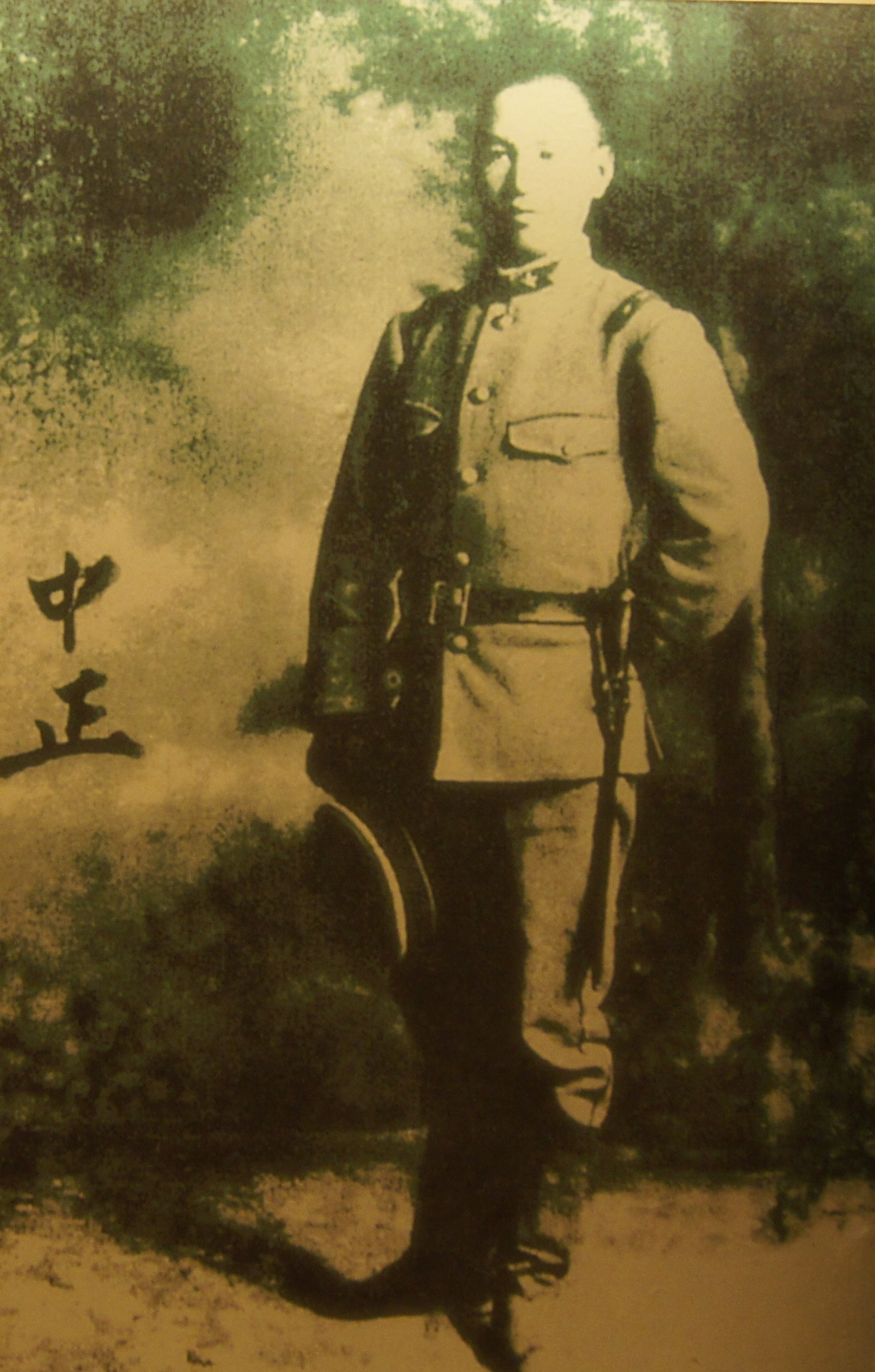
Chiang in 1911, an artillery officer in the Imperial Japanese Army

During his student years in Japan, Chiang occupied himself with revolutionary literature and discussed them with Zhang Qun and a new confidant, Dai Jitao, a Chinese student who earned a place at a Japanese university and whose precociousness made a deep impression on him. Chiang was greatly influenced by the anti-Manchu pamphlet The Revolutionary Army, written by Zou Rong, which called for a violent revolution in China and the establishment of a parliament and a constitution. He also read the newspaper of choice among Chinese exiles, Min Kuo Jih Pao (then edited by Wang Jingwei and Hu Hanmin), which exposed him to Western thinkers such as Jean-Jacques Rousseau and John Stuart Mill. The newspaper advocated for the violent overthrow of the Manchu-dominated Qing and the nationalization of property across the globe. Increasingly extreme left-wing views, such as those espoused in Min Pao and adopted by overseas Chinese such as Chiang, drew the ire of ruling Japanese oligarchs and contributed to the government's decision to expel Sun Yat-sen from the country in 1907.

After graduating from Tokyo Shinbu Gakko, Chiang was commissioned a second-class junior officer in a field artillery regiment, the 19th Field Artillery Regiment of the 13th IJA Division, stationed in Niigata Prefecture; to have active service in the army was a prerequisite for aspiring officers who wished to enter the Imperial Japanese Army Academy. Standing at 5 feet 7 inches and weighing just 130 pounds, Chiang was ill-suited to the regiment's forced marches and winter drills, but was known for his dedication as a soldier. Japanese officers in the regiment remembered him for his discipline and loyalty; a sergeant described Chiang as having an "impressive and forbidding expression." He rose to a first-class soldier on 1 June 1911 and was promoted artillery leader on 1 August that same year. His division commander, general Nagaoka Gaishi, wrote years later—in 1929—an article attributing Chiang's military successes in China to his dedication to "loyalty and gratitude" during his years in the Japanese army.

=== Xinhai Revolutionary ===
Sometime in October 1911, Chiang received a telegram from Chen Qimei notifying him of a finally successful anti-Qing uprising—the Wuchang Uprising—taking place in Wuchang, Hubei, where a mutiny of government soldiers transformed into an outright rebellion which brought control of the city under a friendly revolutionary group, the Society for Common Progress (Chinese: 共進會; pinyin: Gòngjìnhuì). On 11 October, Manchu control over Wuchang's neighboring cities, Hankou and Hanyang, was also overthrown, inspiring a wave of anti-Qing movements across Chins. The uprising, which is now commemorated on Double Ten Day, proved to give the decisive momentum for a national revolution—the Xinhai Revolution—marking the end of the Qing dynasty.

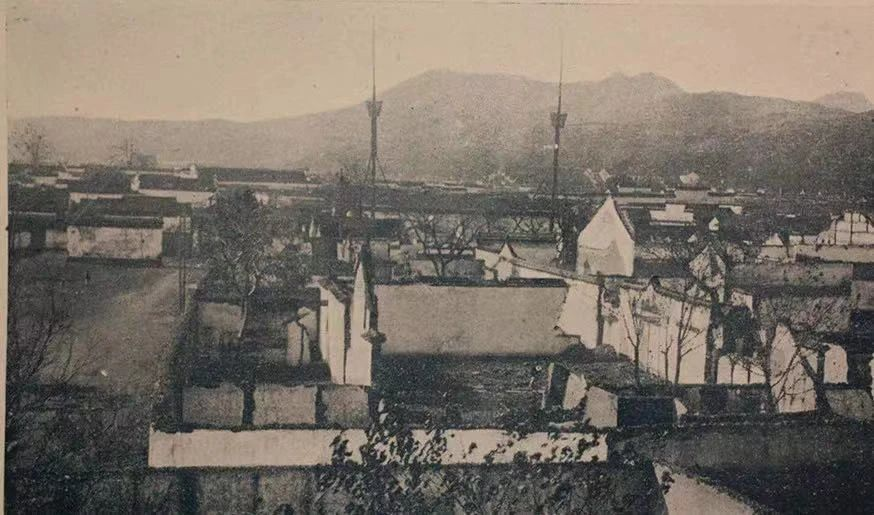
The former Qing governor's yamen in Hangzhou following the 1911 revolution. Chiang led a 120-man detachment in the attack on the yamen on 4 November 1911.

News of the Wuchang Uprising shocked Chiang, who immediately applied to leave military service in order to return to China. At Chen's request, Chiang, along with Zhang Qun and 118 other Chinese cadets, boarded a ship at Nagasaki bound for Shanghai on 13 October to join the revolutionary cause. Shortly before leaving they were honorably discharged from military service. In accordance with bushido custom, Chiang and Zhang drank glasses of water at their farewell in Japan, signifying their determination not to return alive. They arrived in Shanghai on 30 October, where Chiang immediately reported to Chen. Chen placed him in command of a "dare-to-die" unit composed largely of fishermen from Chiang's native Fenghua and members of Shanghai secret societies, and sent the force to join the uprising in Hangzhou. On 4 November, Chiang's unit participated in the seizure of the provincial capital, meeting little resistance from Qing forces.

Afterwards, Chiang returned to Shanghai, where Chen had become military governor and placed him in charge of troops drawn partly from secret-society members and the urban poor. After Sun Yat-sen established the provisional government of the Republic of China in Nanjing, Chiang and Chen opposed Sun's willingness to compromise with Yuan Shikai, commander of the powerful Beiyang Army. In January 1912, Chen's political rival Tao Chengzhang was assassinated while hiding in a Shanghai hospital. Chiang was the assassin; in the early morning of 14 January, he went with a group of confidants to the hospital and personally shot Tao in the head, killing him. Contemporary newspapers and provincial records, however, did not implicate Chiang in the killing.

==== Underground resistance against Yuan Shikai ====
Chiang in 1916, during his opposition to Yuan Shikai

Following Sun's resignation and Yuan's accession to the provisional presidency, Chiang returned to Japan in March 1912. There he studied German in Tokyo in preparation for possible study in Germany and founded the military journal Voice of the Army, in which he published five articles on political topics. He returned to China in 1913 as relations between the Kuomintang (KMT) and Yuan deteriorated following the assassination of KMT leader Song Jiaoren. During the ensuing Second Revolution, Chiang helped plan an attack on the Shanghai arsenal and led unsuccessful assaults on it in July. After Yuan's forces suppressed the rebellion and outlawed the KMT, Chiang and other revolutionary leaders again fled to Japan.

In 1914, Sun sent Chiang back to Shanghai to rebuild the revolutionary underground, but arrests among his followers forced him to escape again to Japan. Chiang subsequently joined Sun's newly formed Chinese Revolutionary Party, whose members pledged personal loyalty to Sun and supported another revolution against Yuan. He returned to Shanghai with Chen in 1915, where the two organized further attacks against Yuan's government; an uprising that December failed, and they narrowly escaped.

Chiang continued fighting Yuan's government after Yuan attempted to restore the monarchy. On 5 May 1916, he seized a fort on the Yangtze between Shanghai and Nanjing, but lost it five days later after his own troops mutinied. On 18 May, Chen was assassinated in the Shanghai French Concession. At Chen's funeral, Chiang publicly vowed to continue his mentor's work; he later wrote that Chen's death was the point at which he was "fully formed" as a revolutionary. Yuan died on 6 June, bringing the immediate struggle against his government to an end.

== Kuomintang reorganization and Whampoa, 1918–1924 ==
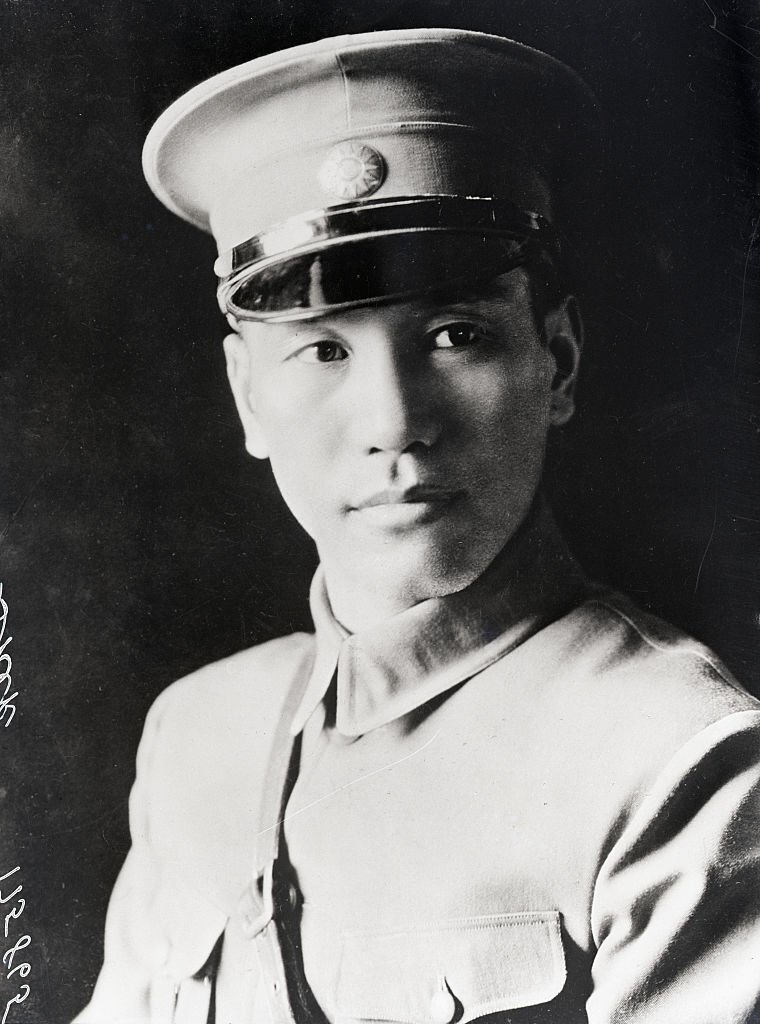
Chiang in the early 1920s

In March 1918, Chiang joined Chen Jiongming's Guangdong Army as head of its field operations department, and in September was given command of a roughly 1,000-man detachment. On 30 September 1920, Sun Yat-sen appointed him chief of staff of the Second Guangdong Army, then the highest position Chiang had held. Sun and Chen increasingly disagreed over strategy, with Sun favoring a strong central government and an early campaign against the northern warlords, while Chen advocated developing Guangdong as a model province within a federal China. In 1922, Chiang urged Sun to attack Chen's forces before proceeding with the Northern Expedition.

In June 1922, Chen's forces attacked Sun's headquarters in Guangzhou, forcing Sun to take refuge aboard the gunboat Yongfeng. Chiang came to Sun's aid and remained with him aboard the vessel until their position became untenable and the two ultimately withdrew through Hong Kong to Shanghai. The episode helped establish Chiang as a loyal right-hand man for Sun, who would later contribute a preface to Chiang's published account of the crisis.

In February 1923, Sun appointed Chiang to the Kuomintang Military Council and made him chief of staff of his personal headquarters. That August, Chiang left for the Soviet Union at the head of a Kuomintang mission charged with discussing Soviet assistance and a proposed military campaign against the Beijing government. He arrived in Moscow on 2 September and remained in the Soviet Union until late November, studying its political and military organizations. Soviet military officials opposed immediate military action, while Leon Trotsky told Chiang that the Soviet Union would provide weapons, advisers, and economic assistance but would not send troops. Chiang criticized aspects of the Soviet political system but was impressed by the Red Army's political commissars, a system he later incorporated into the Kuomintang military.

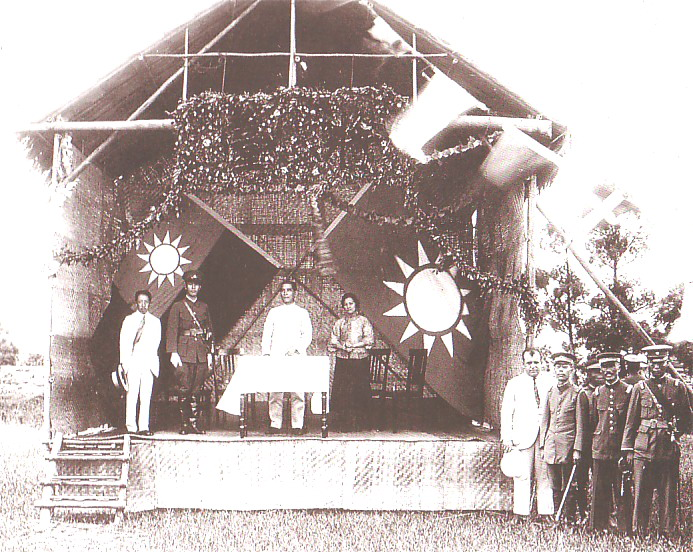
Sun Yat-sen and Chiang at the 1924 opening of the Soviet-funded Whampoa Military Academy

Under the guidance of Soviet adviser Mikhail Borodin, the Kuomintang reorganized itself along Leninist lines at its First National Congress in Guangzhou in January 1924. On 24 January, Chiang was appointed chairman of the preparatory committee for a new military academy at Whampoa, but, following disagreements with Soviet advisers over its curriculum and management, he resigned on 21 February and returned to Zhejiang. After receiving assurances over finances and appointments, he returned to Guangzhou and on 3 May became commandant of the academy and chief of staff of the Guangdong Army. The academy was intended to provide the Kuomintang with a trained force that would reduce its dependence on mercenary armies, and most of the funding used to establish it came from the Soviet Union. It formally opened on 16 June. Soviet military advisers, including Vasily Blyukher, were among its supervisors. Chiang personally selected the academy's early classes, whose graduates later formed an important body of officers associated with him.

Chiang's positions at Whampoa and in the Guangdong Army gave him a base to expand his personal influence. In August 1924, on Sun's orders, weapons imported for the city's Merchants' Volunteer Corps were seized and taken to Whampoa. Fighting between the merchants' militia and government supporters broke out in October, after which Chiang led Kuomintang forces that defeated the militia in two days of street fighting. On 11 November, Chiang was appointed secretary of the Military Department of the Kuomintang Central Executive Committee.

== Rise to power, 1925–1928 ==
=== Struggle for Sun Yat-sen's succession ===
Chiang with graduates of the second class of the Whampoa Military Academy, September 1925

Sun Yat-sen died in Beijing on 12 March 1925. His death precipitated a struggle for power among factions of the Kuomintang, in which Hu Hanmin, Wang Jingwei, Liao Zhongkai, Soviet adviser Mikhail Borodin, Xu Chongzhi, and Chiang were among the principal figures in Guangzhou. At the time of Sun's death, Chiang was campaigning with troops from the Whampoa Military Academy in the Eastern Expedition against Chen Jiongming. By the end of March, the forces to which the Whampoa units belonged had defeated Chen's army and established control over eastern Guangdong. In early June, Chiang's party army and other forces loyal to the KMT leadership defeated the Yunnanese and Guangxi troops then based in Guangzhou.

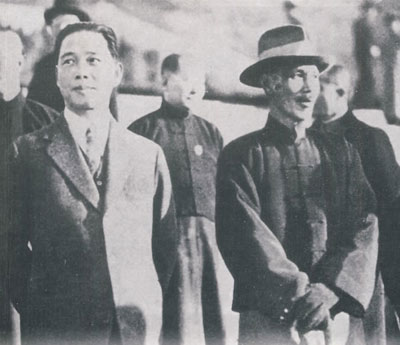
Chiang (right) together with Wang Jingwei (left), 1926

The Nationalist government was formally established in Guangzhou on 1 July 1925 with Wang Jingwei as its chairman, while Chiang joined its Military Council two days later. On 20 August, Liao Zhongkai was assassinated, and a special committee consisting of Wang, Xu, and Chiang was created to investigate the killing. On 20 September, Chiang surrounded Xu's residence with troops and compelled him to leave Guangzhou, after which the Political Council approved Xu's departure for Shanghai. Hu Hanmin was also removed from the immediate political contest and sent to Moscow as the KMT's representative to the Communist International. Following these changes, authority over the KMT rested chiefly with Wang as the principal civilian leader and Chiang as its leading military figure. At the KMT's Second National Congress in January 1926, Chiang was elected to the Central Executive Committee for the first time.

=== Canton Coup and consolidation of power ===
Kuomintang leaders at the party's Second National Congress in Guangzhou, January 1926. Wang Jingwei is second from left, Chiang fourth from left, and Soviet adviser Mikhail Borodin fifth from left.

Tensions between Chiang, Wang, the Chinese Communists, and the Soviet advisers culminated in the Zhongshan Incident of March 1926. On 20 March, Chiang arrested Li Zhilong, the Communist acting head of the National Revolutionary Army's Naval Bureau, placed Guangzhou under martial law, and disarmed guards at the residences of the Soviet advisers and the offices of the Guangzhou–Hong Kong Strike Committee. No conclusive evidence has established either that the Soviet advisers or Chinese Communists were plotting against Chiang or that Chiang himself engineered the movements of the gunboat Zhongshan that precipitated the incident. Chiang and the Soviet representatives nevertheless reached a settlement that preserved their cooperation while providing for the departure of Soviet military adviser Nikolai Kuibyshev, restrictions on Communists holding senior KMT posts, and disclosure of Communist members within the KMT. Wang announced his resignation on 7 April and subsequently went abroad, while Chiang was appointed head of the KMT's Military Affairs Commission.

On 15 May 1926, Chiang chaired a meeting of the Central Executive Committee that adopted new restrictions on Communist activity and office-holding within the KMT. In the ensuing weeks he accumulated additional offices, becoming head of the Military Council and the KMT department responsible for military cadres as well as commander-in-chief of the National Revolutionary Army (NRA). By early July, Chiang had also become chairman of the Central Executive Committee's Political Council. He became the dominant military and political figure in Guangzhou, with an organized army that Sun himself had never possessed.

=== Northern Expedition ===
Nationalist advances during the Northern Expedition, 1926–1928

On 5 June 1926, Chiang was formally appointed commander-in-chief of the planned Northern Expedition. The expedition formally began on 9 July, when NRA troops participated in an oath-taking ceremony in Guangzhou and Chiang publicly accepted his appointment as commander-in-chief. Although the NRA numbered approximately 100,000 men at the beginning of the campaign, it remained a loose coalition of regionally based military forces rather than a unified army under a single chain of command. Chiang's initial strategy was to advance through Hunan, capture Wuhan, join with Feng Yuxiang's forces, and then proceed toward Beijing. By the end of October, the NRA had defeated the principal warlord forces in Hubei and occupied Wuhan, while forces under He Yingqin had captured Fujian and advanced into Zhejiang.

The expedition's successes increased Chiang's military prestige but also intensified political divisions within the KMT. KMT leftists and Communists increasingly concentrated their political organization at Wuhan, where the Central Executive Committee sought to limit Chiang's personal authority. On 1 March 1927, the Wuhan leadership placed Chiang under a newly organized military council, transferred several of his party offices to Wang Jingwei, and issued a secret order for his arrest. On 11 March, while headquartered at Nanchang, Chiang met Japanese politician Yamamoto Jōtarō and argued that lasting friendship between China and Japan required Korea and Taiwan to be freed from Japanese colonial rule. Bai Chongxi's forces entered Shanghai on 22 March, and Chiang reached Nanjing two days later.

=== Split with the Communists and completion of the Northern Expedition ===
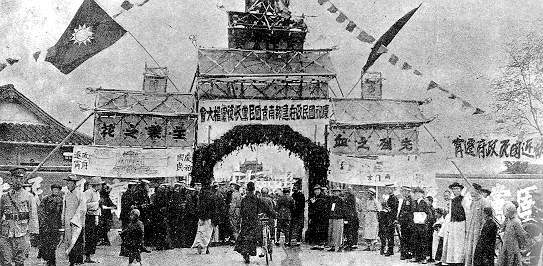
The establishment of the Nationalist government at Nanjing, 18 April 1927

After Wang returned from abroad in early April, Chiang and other KMT leaders in Shanghai urged him to assume leadership of a reunified party and restrain the Communists, but Wang instead returned to Wuhan. On 6 April, the KMT Supervisory Committee in Shanghai established a committee to remove Communists from the party and coordinated with members of Shanghai's Green Gang. In the early hours of 12 April, troops of Bai Chongxi's Seventh Corps seized offices of the Communist-aligned Shanghai Federation of Labor while armed Green Gang groups attacked workers' organizations elsewhere in the city, killing resisters and arresting many others. Further killings and arrests followed in Shanghai, and similar anti-Communist purges took place in other KMT-controlled cities. On 18 April, Chiang proclaimed a rival Nationalist government at Nanjing under the chairmanship of Hu Hanmin. The Wuhan Central Executive Committee responded by expelling Chiang from his posts and offering rewards for his capture or death.

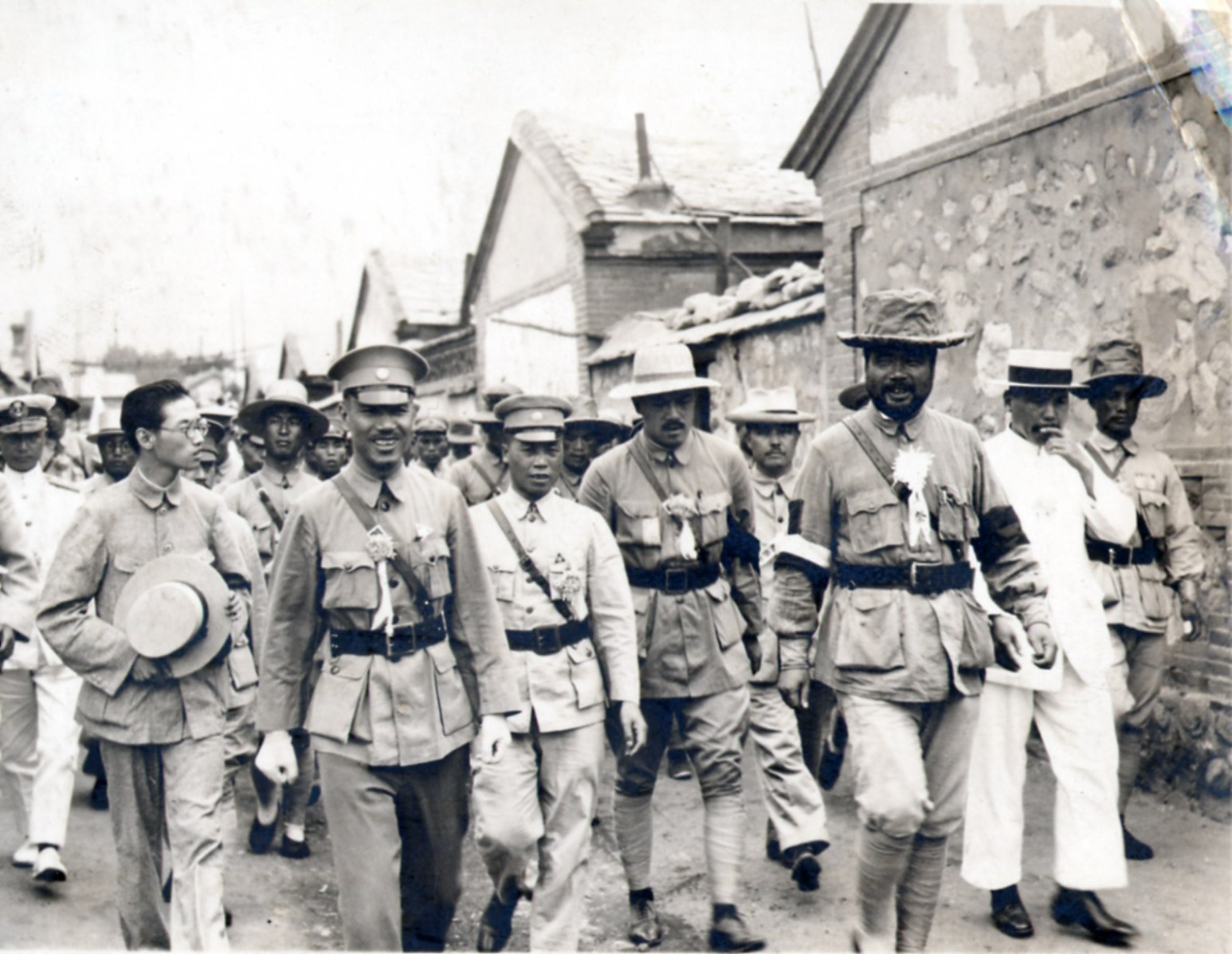
Chiang and Feng Yuxiang in 1928

Chiang's position among anti-Communist military leaders strengthened after the Shanghai purge, and his Nanjing government controlled Shanghai, Nanjing, Zhejiang, Fujian, and portions of Jiangsu and Anhui. The political alignment at Wuhan soon disintegrated as Wang Jingwei moved against the Communists and expelled them from the city, after which the Soviet advisers withdrew. Wang nevertheless refused political reconciliation with Chiang unless Chiang stepped down, and on 12 August 1927 Chiang resigned his posts while calling on the KMT factions to reunite and complete the Northern Expedition.

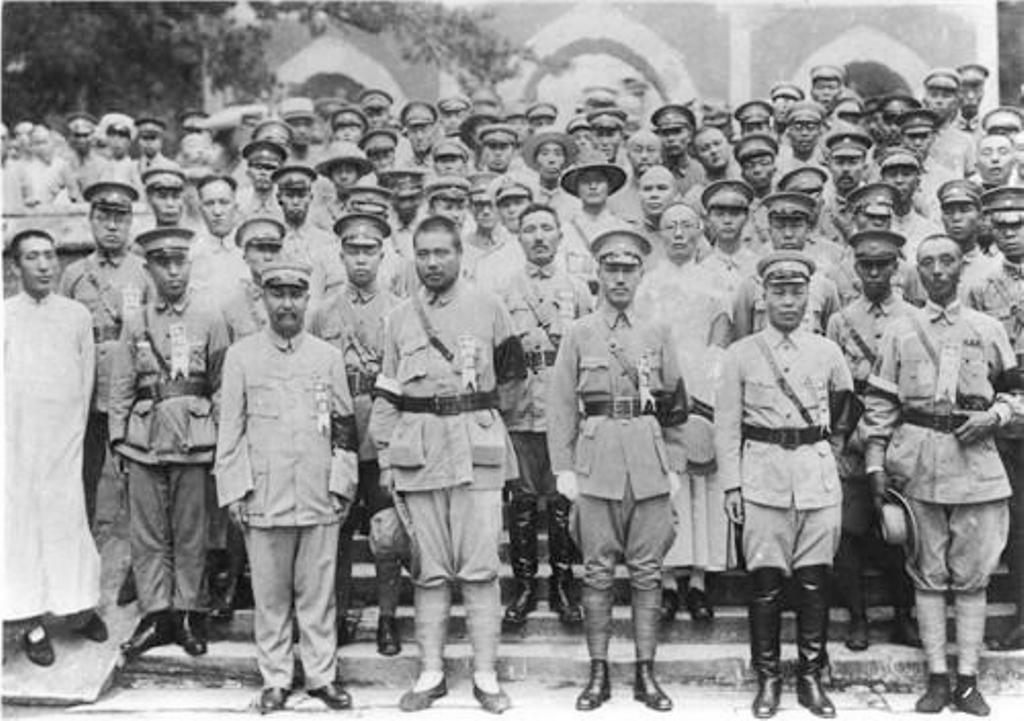
National Revolutionary Army commanders at the Temple of Azure Clouds after the Northern Expedition, July 1928. From the front row are Li Zongren, Chiang, Feng Yuxiang, and Yan Xishan.

KMT military officers and political leaders later called for Chiang's return, and the Central Executive Committee unanimously agreed that he should resume his former positions. Chiang returned to Nanjing and resumed his duties as chairman of the Military Council and commander-in-chief of the Northern Expedition, while Wang again departed for France. At the KMT Central Executive Committee's Fourth Plenum in February 1928, Chiang was confirmed as commander-in-chief of the NRA, elected to the Standing Committee, and made chairman of the Organization Committee. In early April he announced the resumption of the Northern Expedition, with the NRA divided into four army groups commanded respectively by Chiang, Feng Yuxiang, Yan Xishan, and Li Zongren.

As the Nationalist armies advanced toward Beijing in May, the Manchurian warlord Zhang Zuolin ordered his forces to withdraw toward Manchuria. Zhang was mortally wounded on 4 June 1928 when Japanese officers of the Kwantung Army bombed his train near Mukden. By early July, Nationalist forces had taken Beijing, and on 6 July Chiang and his principal military allies gathered before Sun Yat-sen's coffin at the Temple of Azure Clouds to proclaim their loyalty to Sun and to China. With Beijing under Nationalist control, the KMT now controlled all major political centers from northern China to Guangzhou, completing the Northern Expedition.

== Rule ==
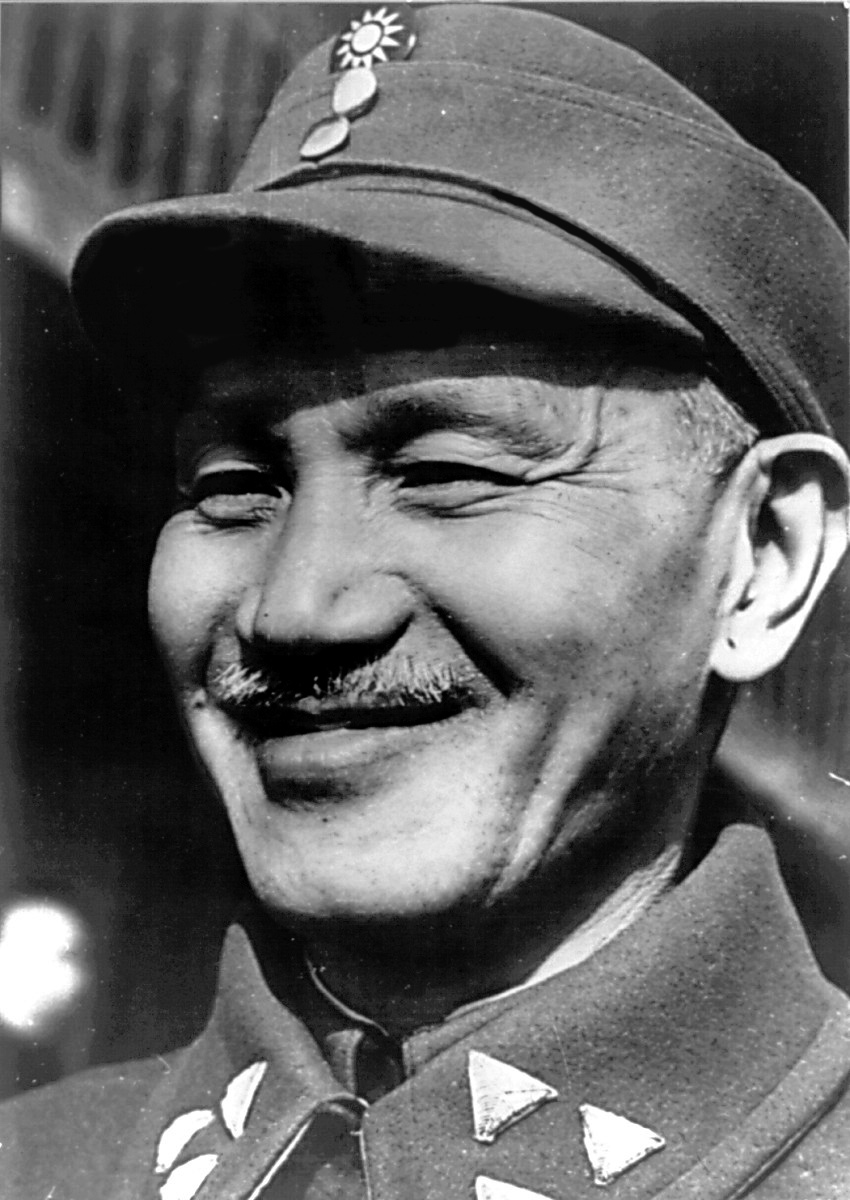
Chiang during a visit to an air force base in 1945

Having gained control of China, Chiang's party remained surrounded by defeated warlords who remained relatively autonomous within their own regions. On 10 October 1928, Chiang was named director of the State Council, the equivalent to President of the country, in addition to his other titles. As with his predecessor Sun Yat-sen, Western media outlets dubbed him "Generalissimo".

According to Sun Yat-sen's plans, the KMT was to rebuild China in three steps: military rule, political tutelage, and constitutional rule. The ultimate goal of the KMT revolution was democracy, which was not considered to be feasible in China's fragmented state. Since the KMT had completed the first step of revolution through seizure of power in 1928, Chiang's rule thus began a period of what his party considered to be "political tutelage" in Sun Yat-sen's name. During this Republican Era, many features of a modern, functional Chinese state emerged and developed.

Communist revolution is fundamentally unsuited to China. Any revolution animated by hatred cannot accord with the moral character of the Chinese people. For once hatred becomes the motivating force, action inevitably descends into cruelty and moral debasement, seeking advantage through the injury of others. Such conduct stands in direct opposition to the ethical foundations of Chinese civilization.

For several millennia, China's moral tradition has been oriented toward altruism rather than self-interest. The inherent disposition of the Chinese people has been one of peacefulness, magnanimity, and moral luminosity. They do not wish to endure cruelty inflicted by others, nor do they wish to impose cruelty upon others. They neither accept ignoble means applied to themselves, nor do they consent to employ ignoble means against others. Accordingly, methods characterized by cruelty and moral baseness cannot take root in China; at the very least, they will never command the approval of the great majority of the people.

Moreover, revolutions prosecuted through cruel and ignoble means have never escaped failure. Since Communist revolution adopts precisely such methods, it is destined to encounter the opposition of the Chinese people as a whole—or, at minimum, of their overwhelming majority. Any revolutionary action that fails to secure the moral sympathy of the majority can never be legitimately undertaken. This constitutes the first and fundamental reason why the Soviet-style Communist revolution is incompatible with China.

—Chiang, "The Differences Between Our Party's National Revolution and the Soviet Communist Revolution," 25 April 1929.

From 1928 to 1937, known as the Nanjing decade, various aspects of foreign imperialism, concessions and privileges in China were moderated by diplomacy. The government acted to modernize the legal and penal systems and attempted to stabilize prices, amortize debts, reform the banking and currency systems, build railroads and highways, improve public health facilities, legislate against traffic in narcotics, and augment industrial and agricultural production. Efforts were made to improve education standards, and the national academy of sciences, Academia Sinica, was founded. In an effort to unify Chinese society, the New Life Movement was launched to encourage Confucian moral values and personal discipline. Guoyu ("national language") was promoted as the official language, and the establishment of communications facilities (including radio) was used to encourage a sense of Chinese nationalism in a way that had not been possible when the nation lacked an effective central government. Under that context, the Chinese Rural Reconstruction Movement was implemented by some social activists who graduated as professors of the United States with tangible but limited progress in modernizing the tax, infrastructural, economic, cultural, and educational equipment and the mechanisms of rural regions. The social activists actively co-ordinated with the local governments in the towns and villages since the early 1930s. However, the policy was subsequently neglected and canceled by Chiang's government because of rampant wars and the lack of resources after the Japanese War and the civil war.

Despite being a conservative, Chiang supported modernization policies such as scientific advancement, universal education, and women's rights. The Kuomintang supported women's suffrage and education and the abolition of polygamy and foot binding. Under Chiang's leadership, the Republic of China government also enacted a women's quota in the parliament, with reserved seats for women. During the Nanjing Decade, access to standardised education increased the literacy rates across China.

Any successes that the Nationalists achieved, however, were met with constant political and military upheavals. Many of the urban areas were now under the control of the KMT, but much of the countryside remained under the influence of weakened but undefeated warlords, landlords, and Communists. Chiang often resolved issues of warlord obstinacy through military action, but such action was costly in terms of men and material. The Central Plains War alone nearly bankrupted the Nationalist government and caused almost 250,000 casualties on both sides. In 1931, Hu Hanmin, an old supporter of Chiang, publicly voiced a popular concern that Chiang's position as both premier and president flew in the face of the democratic ideals of the Nationalist government. Chiang had Hu put under house arrest, but Hu was released after national condemnation. Hu then left Nanjing and supported a rival government in Guangzhou. The split resulted in a military conflict between Hu's Guangdong government and Chiang's Nationalist government.

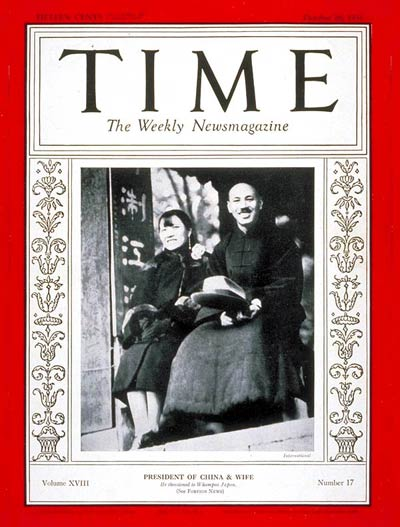
Chiang and Soong on the cover of Time magazine, 26 October 1931

Throughout his rule, complete eradication of the Communists remained Chiang's dream. After he had assembled his forces in Jiangxi, Chiang led his armies against the newly established Chinese Soviet Republic. With help from foreign military advisers such as the German Max Bauer and Alexander von Falkenhausen, Chiang's Fifth Campaign finally surrounded the Chinese Red Army in 1934. The Communists, tipped off that a Nationalist offensive was imminent, retreated in the Long March during which Mao rose from a mere military official to the most influential leader of the Chinese Communist Party.

Some academics and historians have classified Chiang's rule as fascist. The New Life Movement, initiated by Chiang, was based upon Confucianism mixed with Christianity, nationalism, authoritarianism, and elements of fascism, which some historians alleged was an imitation of Nazism. Frederic Wakeman argued that the New Life Movement was "Confucian fascism". Chiang also sponsored the creation of the Blue Shirts Society, in conscious imitation of the Blackshirts in the Italian National Fascist Party and the Sturmabteilung of the Nazi Party. Its ideology was to expel foreign (Japanese and Western) imperialists from China and to crush communism. Close ties with Nazi Germany also gave the Nationalist government access to German military and economic assistance during the mid-1930s. In a 1935 speech, Chiang stated that "fascism is what China now most needs" and described fascism as the stimulant for a declining society. Mao once derogatorily compared Chiang to Adolf Hitler, referring to him as the "Führer of China".

However, other scholars have questioned the view of some scholars that Chiang Kai-shek is a fascist. Jay Taylor argues that Chiang's ideology does not espouse the general ideology of fascism despite his growing sympathies with fascist ideas in the 1930s. Chiang, in a 1945 speech, accused the Empire of Japan of fascism and ultra-militarism. A. James Gregor rejects categorising Chiang's rule as fascist, arguing that the regime lacked the totalitarian mass mobilization of European fascism and functioned instead as a form of developmental nationalism or military authoritarianism. Sino-German relations deteriorated as Germany grew closer to Japan and almost completely broke down when Japan launched a full-scale invasion of China in 1937, which Germany failed to mediate. However, China, throughout the 1930s, refrained from declaring war on the Axis powers, including Germany and Italy. China also did not formally declare war on Japan until after the attack on Pearl Harbor in December 1941, which led to it officially declaring war on Japan, Germany, and Italy.

Chinese Communists and many conservative anti-communist writers have argued that Chiang was pro-capitalist based on the alliance thesis (the alliance between Chiang and the capitalists to purge the communist and the leftist elements in Shanghai, as well as in the resulting civil war). However, Chiang also antagonized the capitalists of Shanghai by often attacking them and confiscating their capital and assets for government use even while he denounced and fought against communists. Critics have called that "bureaucratic capitalism". Historian Parks M. Coble argues that the phrase "bureaucratic capitalism" is too simplistic to adequately characterize this phenomenon. Instead, he says, the regime weakened all social forces so that the government could pursue policies without being responsible nor responsive to any outside political groups. By defeating any potential challenge to its power, government officials could amass sizable fortunes. With that motive, Chiang cracked down pro-communist worker and peasant organizations, as well as rich Shanghai capitalists. Chiang also continued the anti-capitalist rhetoric of Sun Yat-sen and directed the Kuomintang media to attack the capitalists and capitalism openly. He supported government-controlled industries instead. Coble says that the rhetoric had no impact on governmental policy and that its use was to prevent the capitalists from claiming legitimacy within the party or society and to control them and their wealth.

Authority within the Nationalist government ultimately lay with Chiang. All major policy changes on military, diplomatic, or economic issues required his approval. According to historian Odd Arne Westad, "no other leader within the [KMT] had the authority to force through even the simplest decisions. The practical power of high-ranking officials like ministers or the head of the Executive Yuan was more closely tied to their relationship with Chiang than with the formal authority of their position". Chiang created multiple layers of power in his administration which he sometimes played off against each other to prevent individuals or cliques from gathering power that could oppose his authority.

Contrary to the critique that Chiang was highly corrupt, he was not involved in corruption himself. However his wife, Soong Mei-ling, ignored her family's involvement in corruption. The Soong family embezzled $20 million in the course of the 1930s and the 1940s when the Nationalist government's revenues were less than $30 million per year. The Soong family's eldest son, T.V. Soong, was the Chinese premier and finance minister, and the eldest daughter, Soong Ai-ling, was the wife of Kung Hsiang-hsi, the wealthiest man in China. The second daughter, Soong Ching-ling, was the wife of Sun Yat-sen, China's founding father. The youngest daughter, Soong Mei-ling, married Chiang in 1927, and following the marriage, both families became intimately connected, which created the "Soong dynasty" and the "Four Families". However, Soong was also credited for her campaign for women's rights in China, including her attempts to improve the education, culture, and social benefits of Chinese women. Critics have said that the "Four Families" monopolized the regime and looted it. The US sent considerable aid to the Nationalist government but soon realized the widespread corruption. Military supplies that were sent appeared on the black market. Significant sums of money that had been transmitted through T. V. Soong, China's finance minister, soon disappeared. President Truman famously referred to the Nationalist leaders, "They're thieves, every damn one of them." He also said, "They stole $750 million out of the billions that we sent to Chiang. They stole it, and it's invested in real estate down in São Paulo and some right here in New York." Soong Mei-ling and Soong Ai-ling lived luxurious lifestyles and held millions in property, clothes, art, and jewelry. Soong Ai-ling and Soong Mei-ling were also the two richest women in China. Despite living a luxurious life for almost her entire life, Soong Mei-ling left only a $120,000 inheritance, and the reason is that according to her niece, that she donated most of her wealth when she was still alive.

Chiang, requiring support, tolerated corruption with people in his inner circles, as well as high-ranking nationalist officials, but not of lower-ranking officers. In 1934, he ordered seven military officers who embezzled state property to be shot. In another case, several division commanders pleaded with Chiang to pardon a criminal officer, but as soon as the division commanders had left, Chiang ordered him shot. The deputy editor and chief reporter at the Central Daily News, Lu Keng, made headline international news by exposing the corruption of two senior officials, Kong Xiangxi (H. H. Kung) and T. V. Soong. Chiang then ordered a thorough investigation of the Central Daily News to find the source. However, Lu risked execution by refusing to comply and protecting his journalists. Chiang wanted to avoid an international response and so jailed Lu instead. Chiang realized the widespread problems that corruption was creating, so he undertook several anti-corruption campaigns before and after World War II with varying success. Before the war, both campaigns, the Nanjing Decade Cleanup of 1927–1930 and the Wartime Reform Movement of 1944–1947, failed. Both campaigns following World War II and the KMT retreat to Taiwan, the Kuomintang Reconstruction of 1950–1952 and the Governmental Rejuvenation of 1969–1973, succeeded.

Chiang, who viewed all of the foreign great powers with suspicion, wrote in a letter that they "all have it in their minds to promote the interests of their own respective countries at the cost of other nations" and saw it as hypocritical for any of them to condemn one another's foreign policy. He used diplomatic persuasion on the United States, Nazi Germany, and the Soviet Union to regain lost Chinese territories, as he viewed all foreign powers as imperialists that were attempting to exploit China.

=== First phase of Chinese Civil War ===
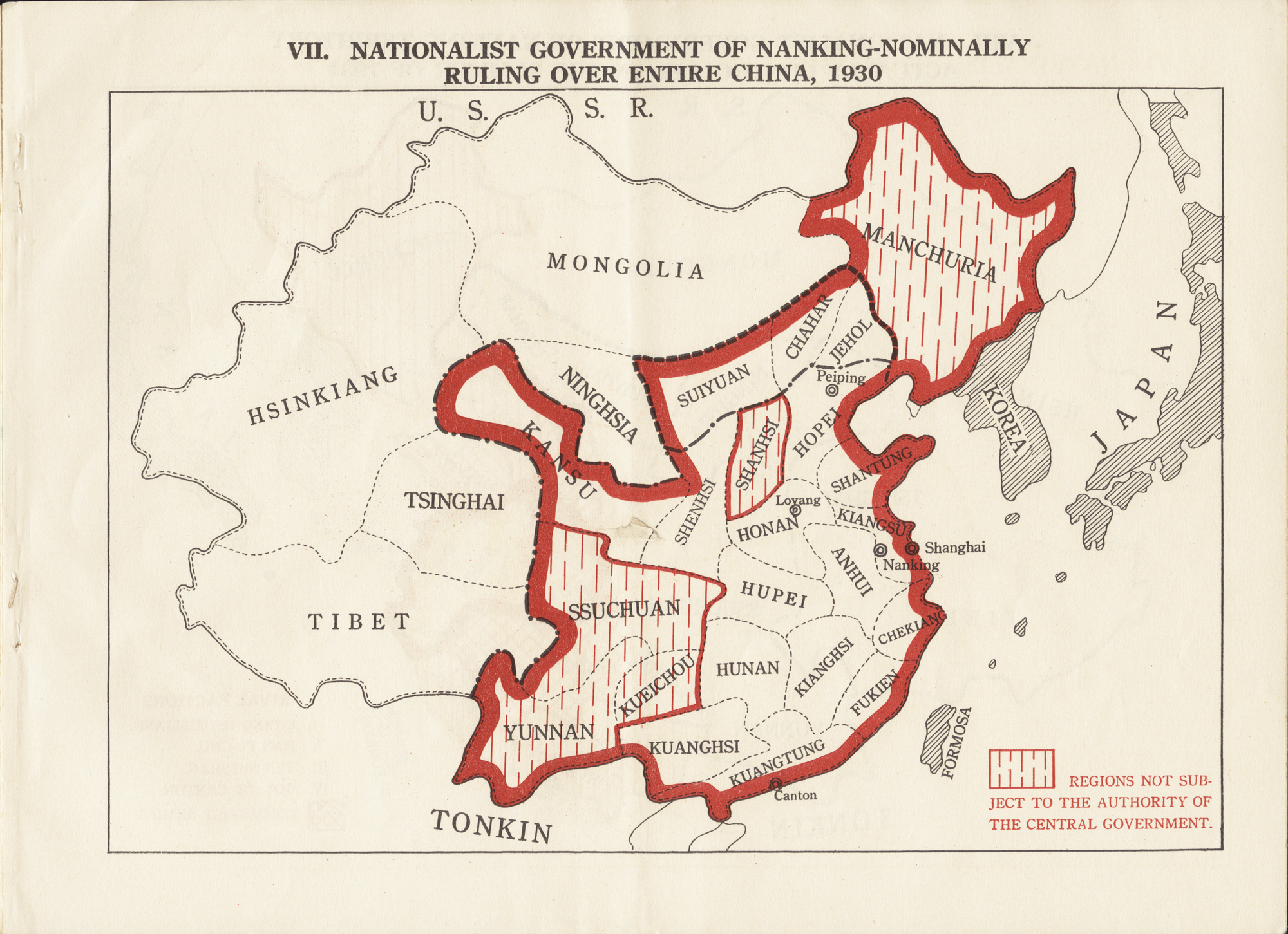
Nationalist government of Nanjing, which nominally ruled over all of China in 1930s

During April 1931, Chiang Kai-shek attended a national leadership conference in Nanjing with Zhang Xueliang and General Ma Fuxiang during which Chiang and Zhang dauntlessly upheld that Manchuria was part of China in the face of the Japanese invasion. After the Japanese invasion of Manchuria in 1931, Chiang resigned as Chairman of the National Government. He returned shortly afterward.

Chiang adopted the slogan "first internal pacification, then external resistance," contending that warlords and the CCP had to be eliminated before the invading Japanese could be opposed. This policy of avoiding a frontal war against Japan and prioritizing anti-communist suppression was widely unpopular and provoked nationwide protests. The CCP called for an end to civil war and a united front against the Japanese. Chiang's policy of non-resistance to Japan contributed to a decrease in support for the Nationalists and an increase in support for the CCP. In 1932, while Chiang was seeking first to defeat the CCP, Japan launched an advance on Shanghai and bombarded Nanjing. That disrupted Chiang's offensives against the CCP for a time, but it was the northern factions of Hu Hanmin's Guangdong government (notably the 19th Route Army) that primarily led the offensive against the Japanese during the skirmish. Brought into the NRA immediately after the battle, the 19th Route Army's career under Chiang would be cut short by being disbanded for demonstrating socialist tendencies.

In December 1936, Chiang flew to Xi'an to co-ordinate a major assault on the Red Army and the CCP, which had retreated into Yan'an. However, Chiang's allied commander Zhang Xueliang, whose forces were used in his attack and whose homeland of Manchuria had been recently invaded by the Japanese, did not support the attack on the Communists. On 12 December, Zhang and several other Nationalist generals, headed by Yang Hucheng of Shaanxi, kidnapped Chiang for two weeks in what is known as the Xi'an Incident. They forced Chiang into making a "Second United Front" with the Communists against Japan. After releasing Chiang and returning to Nanjing with him, Zhang was placed under house arrest, and the generals who had assisted him were executed. The Second United Front had a commitment by Chiang that was nominal at best and was all but dissolved in 1941.

=== Second Sino-Japanese War ===
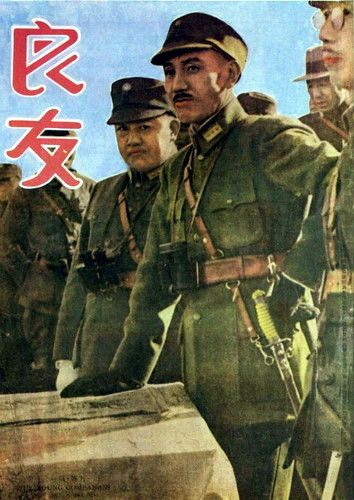
After the outbreak of the Second Sino-Japanese War, The Young Companion featured Chiang on its cover.

The Second Sino-Japanese War broke out in July 1937, and in August, Chiang sent 600,000 of his best-trained and equipped soldiers to defend Shanghai. With over 200,000 Chinese casualties, Chiang lost the political cream of his Whampoa-trained officers. Although Chiang lost militarily, the battle dispelled Japan's claims that it could conquer China in three months and also demonstrated to the Western powers that the Chinese would continue the fight. By December, the capital city of Nanjing had fallen to the Japanese resulting in the Nanjing Massacre. Chiang moved the government inland first to Wuhan and later to Chongqing.

Having lost most of China's economic and industrial centers, Chiang withdrew into the hinterlands, stretched the Japanese supply lines, and bogged down Japanese soldiers in the vast Chinese interior. As part of a policy of protracted resistance, Chiang authorized the use of scorched-earth tactics, which resulted in many civilian deaths. During the Nationalists' retreat from Zhengzhou, the dams around the city were deliberately destroyed by the National Revolutionary Army to delay the Japanese advance, and the subsequent 1938 Yellow River flood killed 800,000 to one million people. Four million Chinese were left homeless. Chiang and the KMT were slow to provide disaster relief.

After heavy fighting, the Japanese occupied Wuhan in the fall of 1938, and the Nationalists retreated farther inland to Chongqing. En route to Chongqing, the Nationalist Army intentionally started the Changsha Fire as a part of its scorched-earth policy. The fire destroyed much of the city, killed 20,000 civilians, and left hundreds of thousands of people homeless. An organizational error (it was claimed) caused the fire to be started without any warning to the residents of the city. The Nationalists eventually blamed three local commanders for the fire and executed them. Newspapers across China blamed the fire on (non-KMT) arsonists, but the blaze contributed to a nationwide loss of support for the KMT.

In 1939, the Muslim leaders Isa Yusuf Alptekin and Ma Fuliang were sent by Chiang to several Middle Eastern countries, including Egypt, Turkey, and Syria, to gain support for the war against Japan and to express his support for Muslims.

The Japanese, controlling the puppet state of Manchukuo and much of China's eastern seaboard, appointed Wang Jingwei as a puppet ruler of the occupied Chinese territories around Nanjing. Wang named himself President of the Executive Yuan and chairman, and he led a surprisingly large minority of anti-Chiang and anti-Communist Chinese against his old comrades. He died in 1944, a year before the end of World War II.

The Hui Xidaotang sect pledged allegiance to the Kuomintang after the party's rise to power, and Hui general Bai Chongxi acquainted Chiang with the Xidaotang Juaozhu Ma Mingren in 1941 in Chongqing.

In 1942 Chiang went on tour in northwestern China in Xinjiang, Gansu, Ningxia, Shaanxi, and Qinghai, where he met the Muslim Generals Ma Buqing and Ma Bufang. He also met the Muslim Generals Ma Hongbin and Ma Hongkui separately.

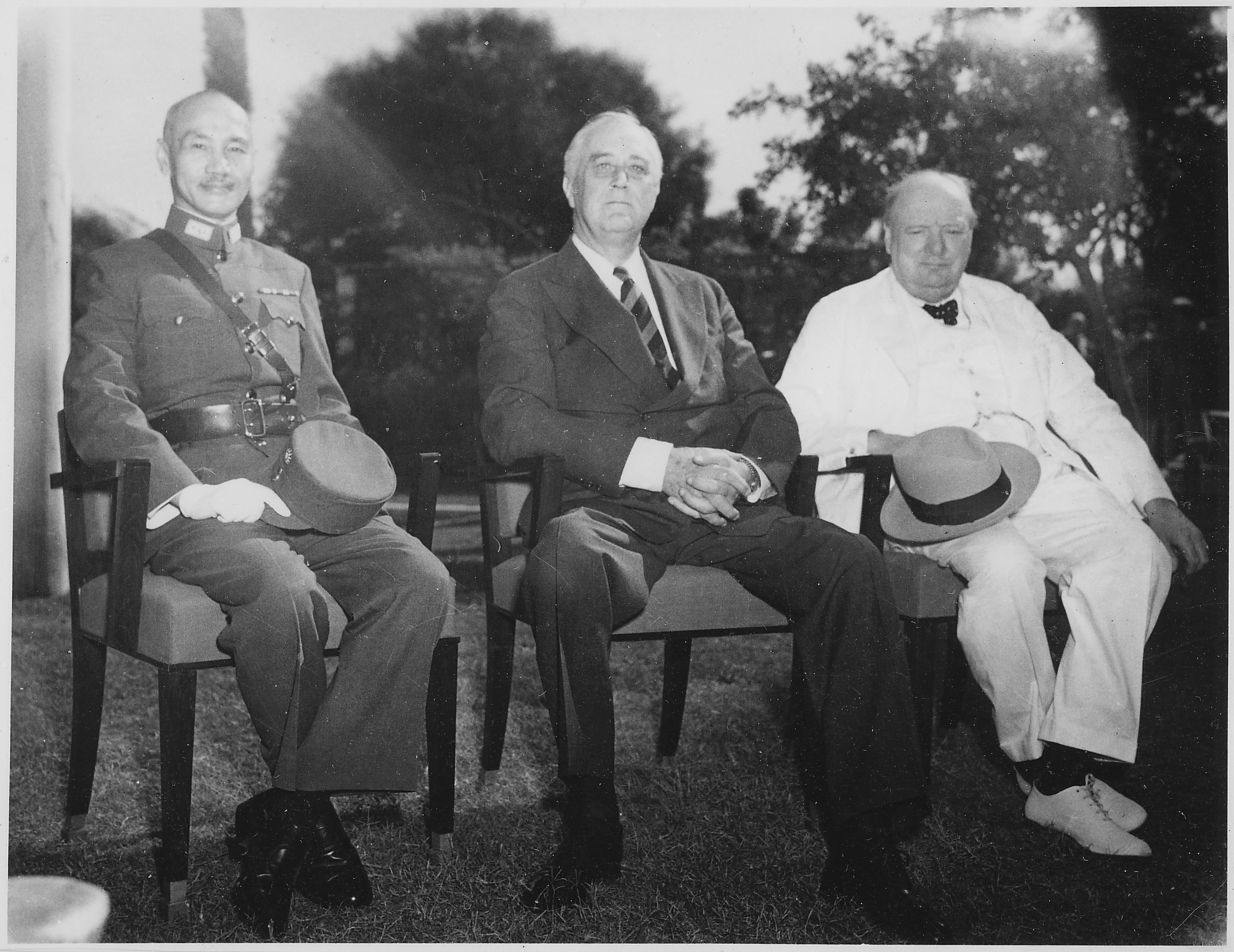
Chiang with Franklin D. Roosevelt and Winston Churchill in Cairo, Egypt, in November 1943

A border crisis erupted with Tibet in 1942. Under orders from Chiang, Ma Bufang repaired Yushu Airport to prevent Tibetan separatists from seeking independence. Chiang also ordered Ma Bufang to put his Muslim soldiers on alert for an invasion of Tibet in 1942. Ma Bufang complied and moved several thousand troops to the Tibetan border. Chiang also threatened the Tibetans with aerial bombardment if they worked with the Japanese. Ma Bufang attacked the Tibetan Buddhist Tsang monastery in 1941. He also constantly attacked the Labrang Monastery.

After the attack on Pearl Harbor and the opening of the Pacific War, China became one of the Allies. During and after World War II, Chiang and his American-educated wife, Soong Mei-ling, known in the United States as "Madame Chiang", held the support of the American China Lobby, which saw in them the hope of a Christian and democratic China. Chiang was even named the Supreme Commander of Allied forces in the China war zone. He was appointed Knight Grand Cross of the Order of the Bath in 1942.

General Joseph Stilwell, an American military advisor to Chiang during World War II, strongly criticized Chiang and his generals for what Stilwell saw as their incompetence and corruption. In 1944, the United States Army Air Corps commenced Operation Matterhorn to bomb Japan's steel industry from bases to be constructed in mainland China. That was meant to fulfill US President Franklin D. Roosevelt's promise to Chiang to begin bombing operations against Japan by November 1944. However, Chiang's subordinates refused to take air base construction seriously until enough capital had been delivered to permit embezzlement on a massive scale. Stilwell estimated that at least half of the $100 million spent on construction of air bases was embezzled by Nationalist party officials.

The poor performance of Nationalist forces during the Japanese Ichigo campaign contributed to the view that Chiang was incompetent. Their poor performance irreparably damaged Chiang and the Nationalists in the view of the Roosevelt administration. Chiang argued that the United States, and Stillwell in particular, were at fault for the failure because they had moved too many Chinese troops into the Burma campaign.

After the Japanese surrender, Chiang had to rely on the assistance of the United States in order to transport his troops to regain control of occupied areas. Non-Chinese found the behavior of these troops and accompanying officials as undercutting Nationalist legitimacy, as Nationalist forces engaged in a "botched liberation" characterized by corruption, looting, and inefficiency.

Chiang tried to balance the influence of the Soviets and the Americans in China during the war. He first told the Americans that they would be welcome in talks between the Soviet Union and China and then secretly told the Soviets that the Americans were unimportant and that their opinions would not be considered. Chiang also used American support and military power in China against Soviet ambitions to dominate the talks. That stopped the Soviets from taking full advantage of the situation in China by the threat of American military action against them.

Chiang's Nationalist government made laws on abortion in China more restrictive during the Second Sino-Japanese War.

=== French Indochina ===
After the war, 200,000 Chinese troops under General Lu Han were sent by Chiang to northern Indochina (north of the 16th parallel) to accept the surrender of Japanese occupying forces there, and the Chinese forces remained in Indochina until 1946, when the French returned. The Chinese used the VNQDD, the Vietnamese branch of the Kuomintang, to increase their influence in Indochina and to put pressure on their opponents. Chiang threatened the French with war in response to maneuvering by the French and Ho Chi Minh's forces against each other and forced them to come to a peace agreement. In February 1946, he also forced the French to surrender all of their concessions in China and to renounce their extraterritorial privileges in exchange for the Chinese withdrawing from northern Indochina and allowing French troops to reoccupy the region. After France's agreement to those demands, 20,000 French soldiers landed in Haiphong, North Vietnam, on 6 March 1946, under the leadership of general Philippe Leclerc de Hauteclocque, followed by the withdrawal of Chinese troops which began in March 1946.

=== Ryukyus ===
According to Republic of China's notes of a dinner meeting during the Cairo Conference in 1943, Roosevelt asked Chiang whether China desired the Ryukyu Islands as territories restored from Japan. Chiang said he would be agreeable to joint occupation and administration by China and the United States.

=== Second phase of Chinese Civil War ===
==== Treatment and use of Japanese soldiers ====
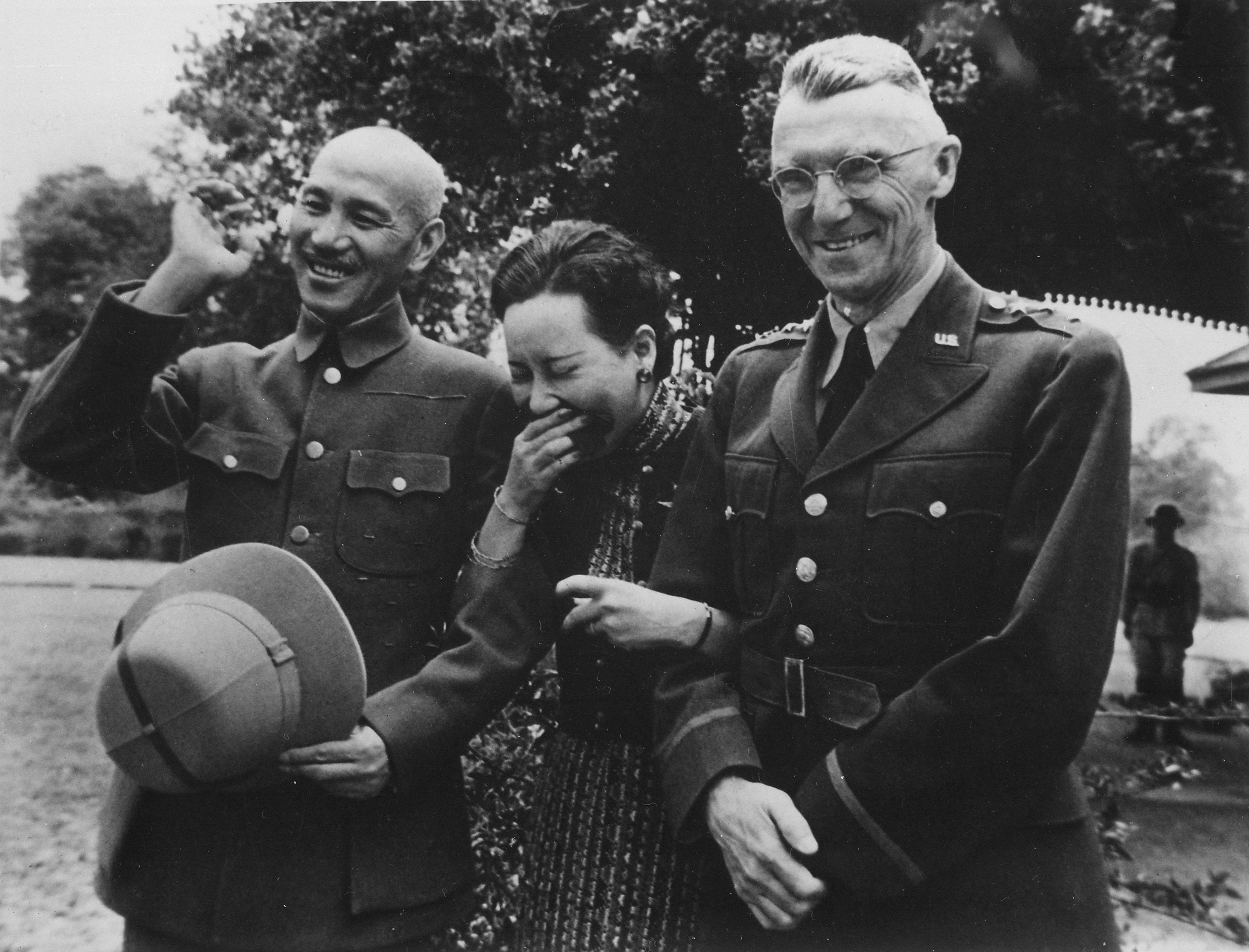
Chiang, Soong Mei-ling, and US Lieutenant General Joseph W. Stilwell in Burma, April 1942

Because of Chiang's focus on his communist opponents, he allowed some Japanese forces and forces from the Japanese puppet regimes to remain on duty in occupied areas in an effort to prevent the communists from accepting their surrender.

American troops and weapons soon bolstered the Nationalist forces, which allowed them to reclaim the cities. The countryside, however, remained largely under Communist control. Chiang implemented his war-time phrase "repay evil with good" and made a huge effort to protect elements of the Japanese invading army. In 1949, a Nationalist court acquitted General Okamura Yasuji, the chief commander of Japanese forces in China, of alleged war crimes, retaining him as an advisor. Nationalist China repeatedly intervened to protect Okamura from repeated American requests to testify at the Tokyo war crimes trial.

Many top Nationalist generals, including Chiang, had studied and trained in Japan before the Nationalists had returned to the mainland in the 1920s and maintained close personal friendships with top Japanese officers. The Japanese general in charge of all forces in China, General Okamura, had personally trained officers who later became generals in Chiang's staff. Reportedly, Chiang seriously considered accepting this offer but declined only because he knew that the United States would certainly be outraged by the gesture. Even so, armed Japanese troops remained in China well into 1947, with some non-commissioned officers finding their way into the Nationalist officer corps. The Japanese in China came to regard Chiang as a magnanimous figure to whom many of them owed their lives and livelihoods; that fact was attested by both Nationalist and Communist sources.

==== Conditions during Chinese Civil War ====
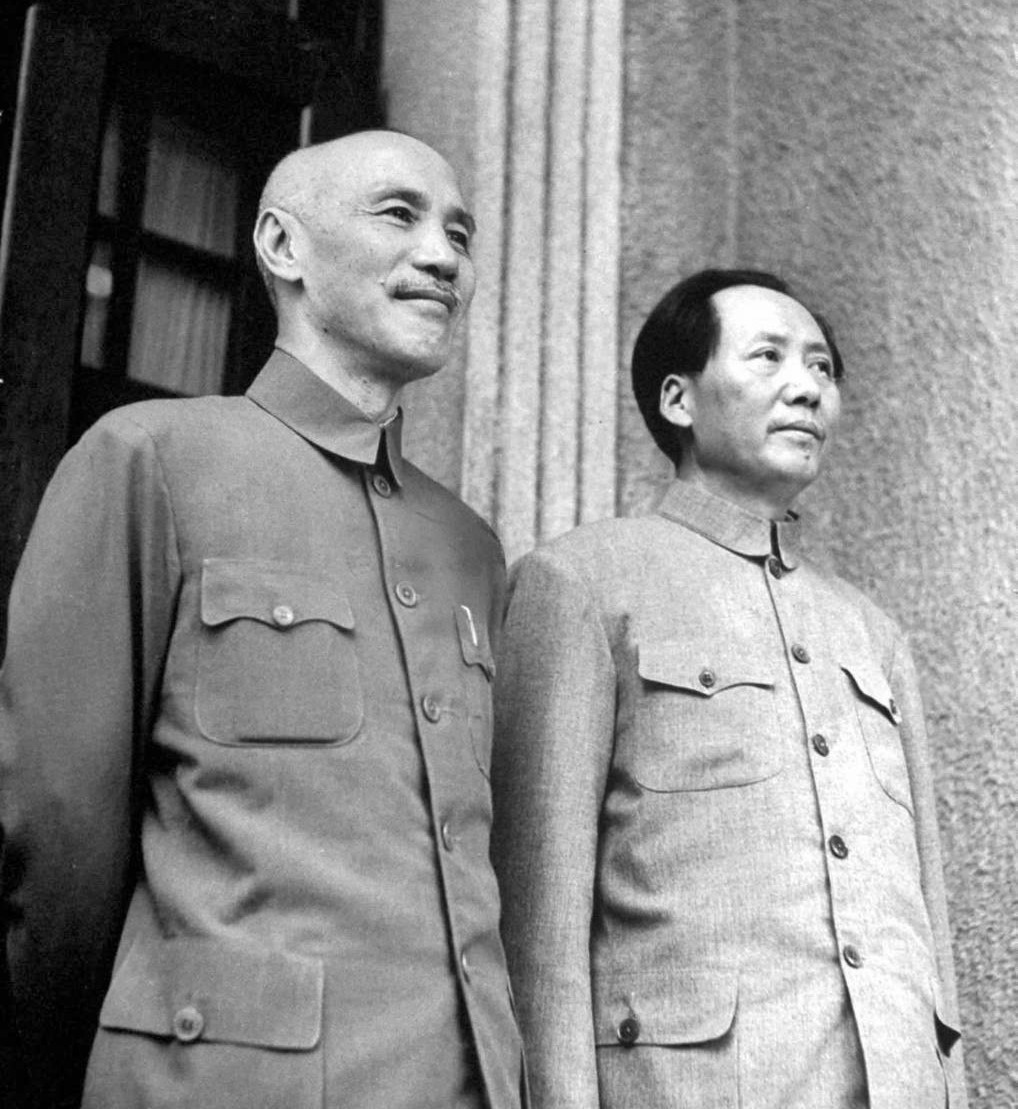
Chiang (left) and Mao (right) in 1945

Chiang did not de-mobilize his troops after the defeat of the Japanese, instead remaining on a war footing to prepare for the resumption of civil war against the Communists. This further strained the economy of Nationalist-era China, worsening deficits. A significant body of evidence suggests that much of the Nationalist military budget in this period was wasted. One factor in military budget waste included that troop counts were inflated above actual head counts and that officers embezzled the salaries of the non-existent soldiers. Another was the power of military commanders over local branches of the Bank of China, which they could require to provide currency outside of the normal budget process.

Although Chiang had achieved status abroad as a world leader, his government deteriorated as the result of corruption and hyperinflation. In his diary in June 1948, Chiang wrote that the KMT had failed not because of external enemies but because of rot from within. The war had severely weakened the Nationalists, and the Communists were strengthened by their popular land reform policies and by a rural population that supported and trusted them. The Nationalists initially had superiority in arms and men, but their lack of popularity, infiltration by Communist agents, low morale, and disorganization soon allowed the Communists to gain the upper hand in the civil war.

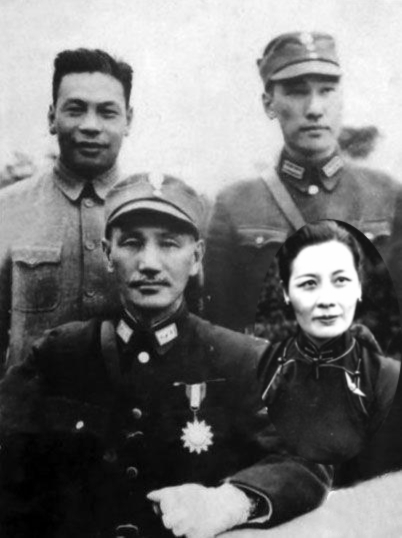
A family photo of Chiang Kai-shek, Soong May-ling, Jin-guo and Wei-guo.

After World War II, the United States encouraged peace talks between Chiang and the Communist leader, Mao Zedong, in Chongqing. Concerns about widespread and well-documented corruption in Chiang's government throughout his rule made the US government limit aid to Chiang for much of the period of 1946 to 1948 despite the fighting against Mao's Red Army. Alleged infiltration of the US government by CCP agents may have also played a role in the suspension of American aid.

Chiang's right-hand man, the secret police chief Dai Li, was anti-American and anti-Communist and a self-declared fascist. Dai ordered Kuomintang agents to spy on American officers. Earlier, Dai had been involved with the Blue Shirts Society, a fascist-inspired paramilitary group within the Kuomintang that wanted to expel Western and Japanese imperialists, crush the Communists, and eliminate feudalism. Dai Li died in a plane crash, which some suspect to be an assassination orchestrated by Chiang; however, the assassination was also rumoured to have been arranged by the American Office of Strategic Services because of Dai's anti-Americanism and since it happened on an American plane.

==== Conflict with Li Zongren ====
A new constitution was promulgated in 1947, and Chiang was elected by the National Assembly as the first President of the Republic of China on 20 May 1948. That marked the beginning of what was termed the "democratic constitutional government" period by the KMT political orthodoxy, but the Communists refused to recognize the new Constitution, and its government as legitimate. Chiang resigned as president on 21 January 1949, as Nationalist forces suffered terrible losses and defections to the Communists. After Chiang's resignation, vice-president Li Zongren became China's acting president.

Shortly after Chiang's resignation, the Communists halted their advances and attempted to negotiate the Nationalists' virtual surrender. Li tried to negotiate milder terms to end the civil war but had no success. When it became clear that Li was unlikely to accept Mao's terms, the Communists issued an ultimatum in April 1949 that warned that they would resume their attacks if Li did not agree within five days. Li refused.

Li's attempts to carry out his policies faced varying degrees of opposition from Chiang's supporters and were generally unsuccessful. Taylor has noted that Chiang had a superstitious belief in holding Manchuria. After the Nationalist military defeat in the province, Chiang lost faith in winning the war and started to prepare for the retreat to Taiwan. Chiang especially antagonized Li by taking possession of and moving to Taiwan US$200 million of gold and US dollars that belonged to the central government. Li desperately needed them to cover the government's soaring expenses. When the Communists captured the Nationalist capital of Nanjing in April 1949, Li refused to accompany the central government as it fled to Guangdong and instead expressed his dissatisfaction with Chiang by retiring to Guangxi.

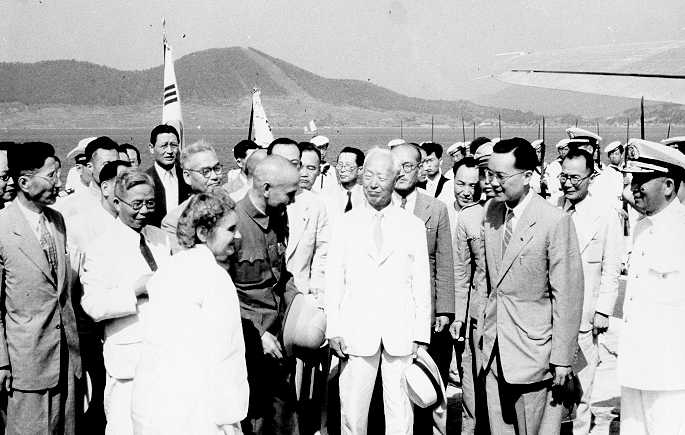
Chiang with South Korean President Syngman Rhee in August 1949

The former warlord Yan Xishan, who had fled to Nanjing only one month earlier, quickly insinuated himself within the Li-Chiang rivalry and attempted to have Li and Chiang reconcile their differences in the effort to resist the Communists. At Chiang's request, Yan visited Li to convince Li not to withdraw from public life. Yan broke down in tears while he talked of the loss of his home province of Shanxi to the Communists, and he warned Li that the Nationalist cause was doomed unless Li went to Guangdong. Li agreed to return if Chiang surrendered most of the gold and US dollars in his possession that belonged to the central government, and Chiang stopped overriding Li's authority. After Yan communicated those demands and Chiang agreed to comply with them, Li departed for Guangdong.

In Guangdong, Li attempted to create a new government composed of both supporters and opponents of Chiang. Li's first choice of premier was Chu Cheng, a veteran member of the Kuomintang who had been virtually driven into exile for his strong opposition to Chiang. After the Legislative Yuan jas rejected Chu, Li was obliged to choose Yan Xishan instead. By then, Yan was well known for his adaptability, and Chiang welcomed his appointment.

The conflict between Chiang and Li persisted. Although he had agreed to do so as a prerequisite of Li's return, Chiang refused to surrender more than a fraction of the wealth that he had sent to Taiwan. Without being backed by gold or foreign currency, the money that was issued by Li and Yan quickly declined in value until it became virtually worthless. Although he did not hold a formal executive position in the government, Chiang continued to issue orders to the army, and many officers continued to obey Chiang, rather than Li. The inability of Li to co-ordinate KMT military forces led him to put into effect a plan of defense that he had contemplated in 1948. Instead of attempting to defend all of southern China, Li ordered what remained of the Nationalist armies to withdraw to Guangxi and Guangdong. He hoped that he could concentrate all available defenses on the smaller area, which would be more easily defensible. The object of Li's strategy was to maintain a foothold in mainland China in the hope that the United States would eventually be compelled to enter the war in China on the Nationalist side.

==== Final Communist advance ====
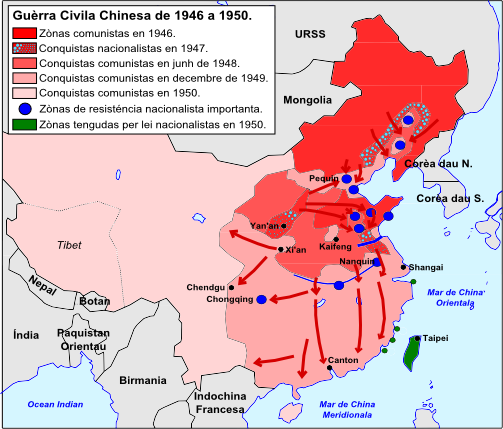
Map of the Chinese Civil War (1946–1950)

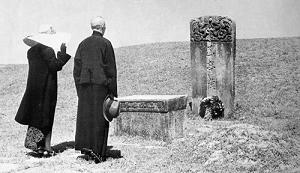
Chiang and his wife pay homage to his ancestors in Fenghua shortly before fleeing the mainland

Chiang opposed Li's plan of defense because it would have placed most of the troops who were still loyal to Chiang under the control of Li and Chiang's other opponents in the central government. To overcome Chiang's intransigence, Li began ousting Chiang's supporters within the central government. Yan Xishan continued in his attempts to work with both sides, which created the impression among Li's supporters that he was a stooge of Chiang, and those who supported Chiang began to bitterly resent Yan for his willingness to work with Li. Because of the rivalry between Chiang and Li, Chiang refused to allow Nationalist troops loyal to him to aid in the defense of Guangxi and Guangdong. That let Communist forces occupy Guangdong in October 1949.

After Guangdong fell to the Communists, Chiang relocated the government to Chongqing, and Li effectively surrendered his powers and flew to New York for treatment of his chronic duodenum illness at the Hospital of Columbia University. Li visited President Truman, and denounced Chiang as a dictator and an usurper. Li vowed that he would "return to crush" Chiang once he returned to China. Li remained in exile and did not return to Taiwan.

In the early morning of 10 December 1949, Communist troops laid siege to Chengdu, the last KMT-controlled city in mainland China, where Chiang Kai-shek and his son Chiang Ching-kuo directed the defense at the Chengtu Central Military Academy. Flying out of Chengdu Fenghuangshan Airport, father and son were evacuated to Taiwan via Guangdong on the aircraft May-ling and arrived the same day. Chiang Kai-shek would never return to the mainland.

Historian Odd Arne Westad says the Communists won the Civil War because they made fewer military mistakes than Chiang had. Also, his search for a powerful centralized government made Chiang antagonize too many interest groups in China. Furthermore, his party was weakened by the war against Japan. Meanwhile, the Communists told different groups, such as peasants, exactly what they wanted to hear and cloaked themselves in the cover of Chinese nationalism.

Chiang did not reassume the presidency until 1 March 1950. In January 1952, Chiang commanded the Control Yuan, now in Taiwan, to impeach Li in the "Case of Li Zongren's Failure to carry out Duties due to Illegal Conduct" (李宗仁違法失職案). Chiang relieved Li of the position as vice-president of the National Assembly in March 1954.

=== In Taiwan ===
==== Preparations to retake the mainland ====
Chiang moved the government to Taipei, Taiwan, where he resumed his duties as president on 1 March 1950. Chiang was re-elected by the National Assembly to be the President of the Republic of China on 20 May 1954, and again in 1960, 1966, and 1972. He continued to claim sovereignty over all of China, including the territories held by his government and the People's Republic, as well as territory the latter ceded to foreign governments, such as Tuva and Outer Mongolia. In the context of the Cold War, most of the Western world recognized that position, and the ROC represented China in the United Nations and other international organizations until the 1970s.

During his presidency on Taiwan, Chiang continued making preparations to take back mainland China. He developed the JROTC army to prepare for an invasion of the mainland and to defend Taiwan in case of an attack by the Communist forces. He also financed armed groups in mainland China, such as Muslim soldiers of the ROC Army who had been left in Yunnan under Li Mi and continued to fight. It was not until the 1980s that those troops were finally airlifted to Taiwan. He promoted the Uyghur Yulbars Khan to governor during the Islamic insurgency on the mainland for resisting the Communists even though the government had already evacuated to Taiwan. He planned an invasion of the mainland in 1962. In the 1950s, Chiang's airplanes dropped supplies to Kuomintang Muslim insurgents in Qinghai, in the traditional Tibetan area of Amdo.

==== Regime in Taiwan ====
The democratic provisions of the constitution were suspended before the retreat in 1948 by the "Temporary Provisions Effective During the Period of Communist Rebellion". They gave the state emergency powers to fight the civil war. When the ROC relocated to Taiwan, the Temporary Provisions became permanent. Martial law was instituted to continue the war against the People's Republic of China and used to suppress political opposition to the KMT. This allowed Chiang to govern with a one-party state consisting almost completely of refugees from the mainland (waishengren). Elections were suspended on the pretext that legitimate results required the participation of constituencies in PRC-controlled mainland China; members of the government elected in 1947–1948 held their posts indefinitely in what became known as the "Eternal Parliament". The Temporary Provisions also allowed Chiang to circumvent the presidential two-term limit; he was reelected as president by the National Assembly to consecutive terms in 1954, 1960, 1966, and 1972.

Chiang's domestic policy promoted Chinese nationalism; local Taiwanese culture (benshengren) was ignored or suppressed, including restricting the use of local languages in mass media and schools. The marginalization of benshengren led to the February 28 incident, an anti-government uprising that the ROC violently suppressed; up to 30,000 Taiwanese intellectuals, activists, and suspected KMT opponents were killed or disappeared. The state's program of anti-Communist repression, the "White Terror", imprisoned about 140,000 Taiwanese for real or perceived opposition to the KMT; most were prosecuted as Chinese Communist Party (CCP) agents ("Communist bandit and spies" (匪諜)) or supporters of "Taiwanese Separatists" (台獨分子).

Chiang became increasingly disillusioned with the KMT, believing that rampant corruption, power-brokering, and factional struggles—particularly the CC Clique, which challenged Chiang's authority—had severely undermined the party's ability to govern effectively. At one point, he considered dissolving the KMT altogether and replacing it with a new party. However, in 1950, he ultimately chose reform. He created the Party Reform Program (國民黨改造方案) and the Central Reform Committee (中央改造委員會). The committee wanted to emulate aspects of CCP's organizational; this was to create a highly disciplined, centralized, and people-supporting party apparatus that could exert top-down authoritarian control while incorporating grassroots feedback. Another goal was to rapidly increase the part membership from 80,000 to 500,000 within five years, and implementing KMT branches within public institutions such as schools. Chiang wanted to replace corrupt officials and establish a meritocratic system, mandating that government positions be filled primarily by technocrats selected from top universities.

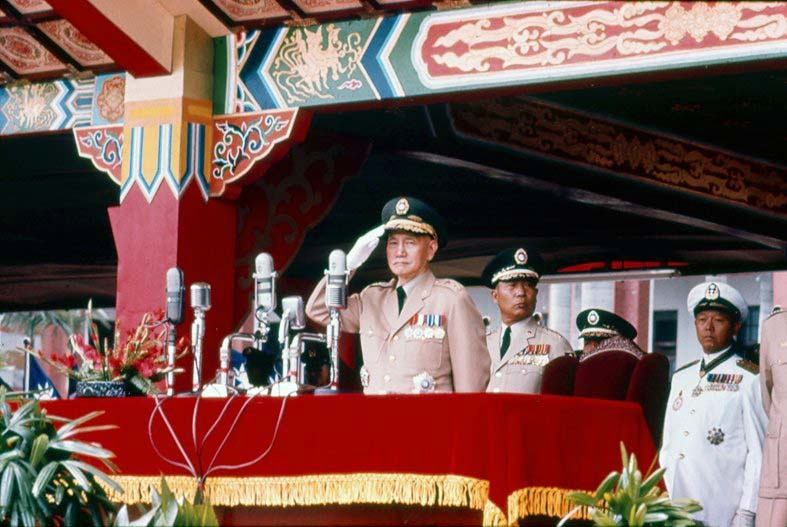
Chiang presiding over the 1966 Double Ten celebrations

Chiang believed that corruption and lack of morals were key reasons for the ROC's defeat in the civil war. He attempted to dismiss KMT members accused of corruption. Some major figures in the previous mainland Chinese government, such as Chiang's brothers-in-law H. H. Kung, T. V. Soong and nephew Chen Lifu, exiled themselves to the United States. Although politically authoritarian and, to some extent, dominated by government-owned industries, Chiang's new Taiwanese state also encouraged economic development, especially in the export sector. A popular sweeping Land Reform Act, as well as American foreign aid during the 1950s, laid the foundation for Taiwan's economic success to become one of the Four Asian Tigers. After retreating to Taiwan, Chiang learned from his mistakes and failures in the mainland and blamed them for failing to pursue Sun Yat-sen's ideals of the Three Principles of the People. Chiang's land reform more than doubled the land ownership of Taiwanese farmers. It removed the rent burdens on them, with former landowners using the government compensation to become the new capitalist class. He promoted a mixed economy of state and private ownership with economic planning, with a focus on export-oriented industrialization. Chiang also promoted a nine-year free education and the importance of science in Taiwanese education and values. Those measures generated great success, with consistent and strong growth and the stabilization of inflation.

After the government of the Republic of China had moved to Taiwan, Chiang Kai-shek's economic policy turned towards to economic liberalism and used Sho-Chieh Tsiang and other liberal economists to promote economic liberalization reforms in Taiwan.

However, Taylor has noted that the developmental model of Chiangism in Taiwan still had elements of socialism, and the Gini index of Taiwan was around 0.28 by the 1970s, which was lower than the relatively-egalitarian West Germany. ROC (Taiwan) was one of the most equal countries in the pro-western bloc. Those in the lower 40% of income doubled their share to 22% of the total income, with the upper 20% shrinking their share from 61% to 39%, from the time of Japanese rule. The Chiangist economic model can be seen as a form of dirigisme, with the state playing a crucial role in directing the market economy. Small businesses and state-owned enterprises in Taiwan flourished under the economic model, but the economy did not see the emergence of corporate monopolies, unlike in most other major capitalist countries.

After the democratization of Taiwan, it began to slowly drift away from the Chiangist economic policy to embrace a more free market system, as part of the economic globalization process under the context of neoliberalism.

Chiang had the personal power to review the rulings of all military tribunals, which during the martial law period tried civilians as well. In 1950, Lin Pang-chun and two other men were arrested on charges of financial crimes and sentenced to 3–10 years in prison. Chiang reviewed the sentences of all three and ordered them executed instead. In 1954, the Changhua monk Kao Chih-te and two others were sentenced to 12 years in prison for providing aid to accused communists. Chiang sentenced them to death after he had reviewed the case. That control over the decision of military tribunals violated the ROC constitution.

After Chiang's death, the next president, his son, Chiang Ching-kuo, and Chiang Ching-kuo's successor, Lee Teng-hui, a Taiwanese local, would in the 1980s and 1990s increase native Taiwanese representation in the government and loosen the many authoritarian controls of the early era of ROC control in Taiwan, paving way for the democratization process.

==== Relations with Japan ====
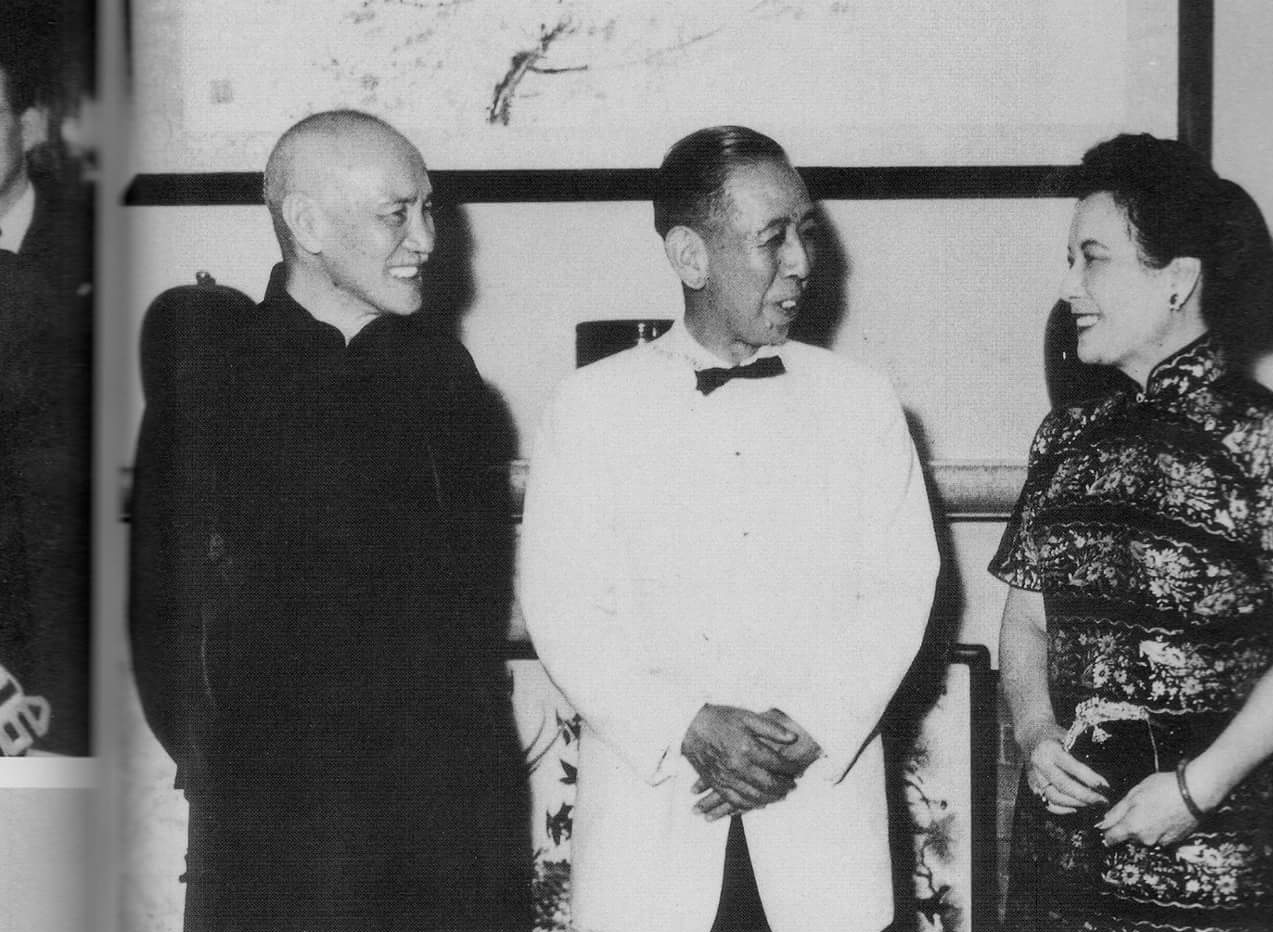
Chiang with Japanese politician (and former Manchukuo official) Nobusuke Kishi in 1957

Chiang's government and Japan maintained formal diplomatic relations under the framework of the Treaty of Taipei signed in 1952. Chiang pursued a policy of "repaying malice with virtue" (by waiving war reparations and allowing Japanese soldiers to safely return home), which helped forge a strong anti-communist partnership.

In 1971, the former Australian opposition leader Gough Whitlam (who became Prime Minister in 1972, and swiftly relocated the Australian mission from Taipei to Beijing) visited Japan. After meeting with Japanese Prime Minister Eisaku Sato Whitlam observed that the reason that Japan was hesitant to withdraw recognition from the Nationalist government was "the presence of a treaty between the Japanese government and that of Chiang Kai-shek." Sato explained that the continued recognition of Japan towards the Nationalist government was largely because of the personal relationship that various members of the Japanese government felt towards Chiang. This relationship was rooted largely in the generous and lenient treatment of Japanese prisoners-of-war by the Nationalist government in the years immediately after the Japanese surrender in 1945, and was felt especially strongly as a bond of personal obligation by the most senior members who were in power.

Although Japan recognized the People's Republic in 1972, shortly after Kakuei Tanaka had succeeded Sato as Prime Minister of Japan, the memory of the relationship was strong enough to be reported by The New York Times (15 April 1978) as a significant factor inhibiting trade between Japan and the mainland. There is speculation that a clash between Communist forces and a Japanese warship in 1978 was caused by Chinese anger by Japanese Prime Minister Takeo Fukuda attending Chiang's funeral. Historically, Japan's attempts to normalize its relationship with the People's Republic were met with accusations of ingratitude in Taiwan.

==== Relations with United States ====
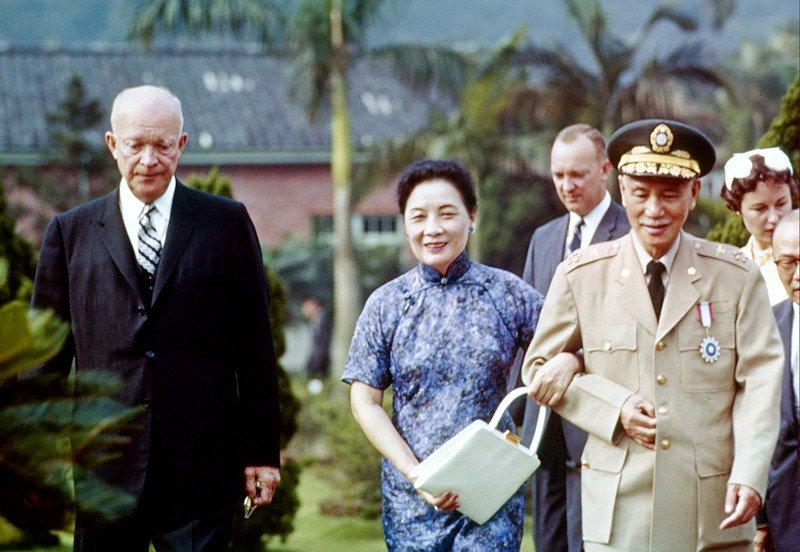
Chiang with US President Dwight D. Eisenhower in June 1960

Chiang was suspicious that covert operatives of the United States were plotting a coup against him.

In 1950, Chiang Ching-kuo became head of Bureau of Investigation and Statistics, which he remained until 1965. Chiang Kai-shek was also suspicious of politicians who were overly friendly to the United States and considered them to be attempting to leaking confidential news. After moved to United States the same year, Wu became a vocal critic of Chiang's family and government watch dog with US supported funds.

Chiang Ching-kuo, who had been educated in the Soviet Union, initiated Soviet-style military organization in the Republic of China Armed Forces. He reorganized and Sovietized the political officer corps and propagated Kuomintang ideology throughout the military. Sun Li-jen, who had been educated at the American Virginia Military Institute, opposed those practices.

Chiang Ching-kuo orchestrated the controversial court-martial and arrest of General Sun Li-jen in August 1955 for plotting a coup d'état with the CIA against his father, Chiang Kai-shek, and the Kuomintang. The CIA allegedly wanted to help Sun take control of Taiwan and declare its independence.

== Death ==
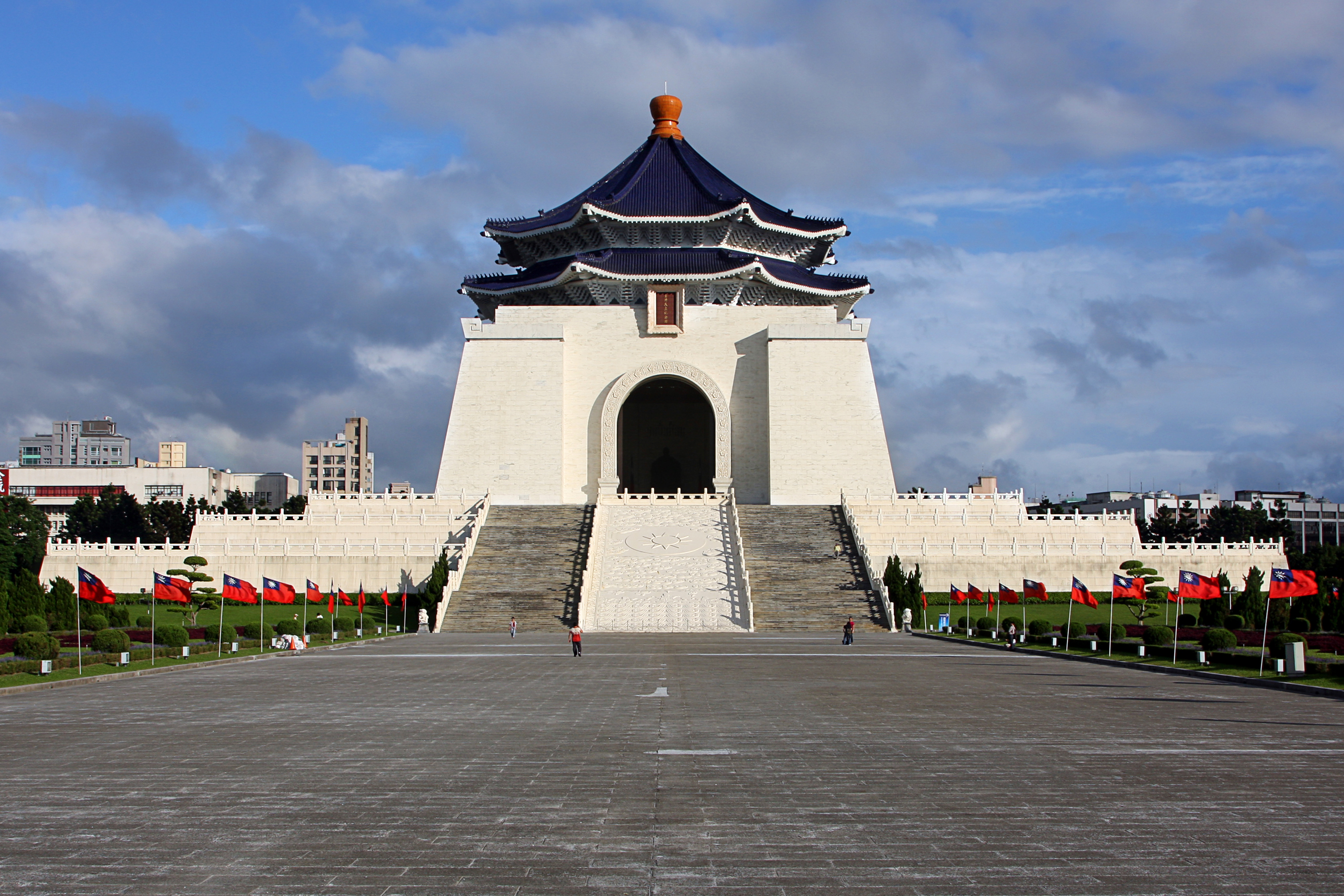
The Chiang Kai-shek Memorial Hall is a famous monument, landmark, and tourist attraction in Taipei, Taiwan.

In 1975, 26 years after Chiang had come to Taiwan, he died in Taipei at the age of 87. His wife and his eldest son, Premier Chiang Ching‐kuo, were at his bedside. He had suffered a heart attack and pneumonia in the foregoing months, and died from kidney failure aggravated by advanced heart failure on 5 April. Chiang's funeral was held on 16 April.

A month of mourning was declared. The response by Japanese media was swift and shaped by a respect for Chiang, who had been trained in Japanese military schools and shared a particular fondness for the Japanese Empire. The Chinese music composer Hwang Yau-tai wrote the "Chiang Kai-shek Memorial Song". In mainland China, however, Chiang's death was met with little apparent mourning, and Communist state-run newspapers gave the brief headline "Chiang Kai-shek Has Died". Chiang's body was put in a copper coffin and temporarily interred at his favorite residence in Cihu, Daxi, Taoyuan. His funeral was attended by dignitaries from many nations, including US Vice President Nelson Rockefeller, South Korean Prime Minister Kim Jong-pil, and two former Japanese prime ministers: Nobusuke Kishi and Eisaku Sato. Chiang Kai-shek Memorial Day was established on 5 April. The memorial day was disestablished in 2007.

When his son, Chiang Ching-kuo, died in 1988, he was entombed in a separate mausoleum in nearby Touliao. The hope was to have both of them buried at their birthplace in Fenghua when that would be possible. In 2004, Chiang Fang-liang, the widow of Chiang Ching-kuo, asked for both father and son to be buried at Wuzhi Mountain Military Cemetery in Xizhi, Taipei County (now New Taipei City). Chiang's ultimate funeral ceremony became a political battle between the wishes of the state and those of his family.

Chiang was succeeded as president by Vice President Yen Chia-kan and as Kuomintang party ruler by his son Chiang Ching-kuo, who retired Chiang Kai-shek's title of Director-General and instead assumed the position of chairman. Yen's presidency was interim; Chiang Ching-kuo, who was the Premier, became president after the end of Yen's term three years later.

== Cult of personality ==
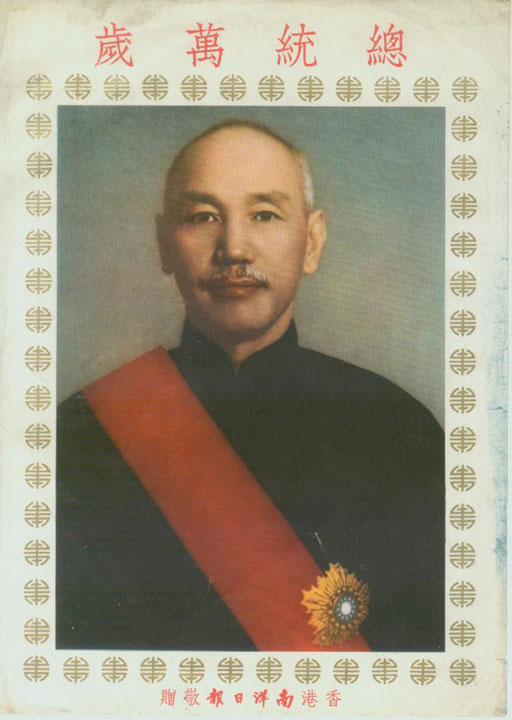
Chinese propaganda poster proclaiming "Long Live the President"

Chiang's portrait hung over Tiananmen Square until 1949, when it was displaced with Mao's portrait. Portraits of Chiang were common in private homes and in public on the streets. After his death, the Chiang Kai-shek Memorial Song was written in 1988 to commemorate Chiang Kai-shek. In Cihu, there are several statues of Chiang Kai-shek.

Chiang was popular among many people and dressed in plain, simple clothes, unlike contemporary Chinese warlords who dressed extravagantly.

Quotes from the Quran and hadith were used by Muslims in the Kuomintang-controlled Muslim publication, the Yuehua, to justify Chiang Kai-shek's rule over China. When the Muslim general and warlord Ma Lin was interviewed, he was described as having "high admiration for and unwavering loyalty to Chiang Kai-shek".

== Philosophy ==
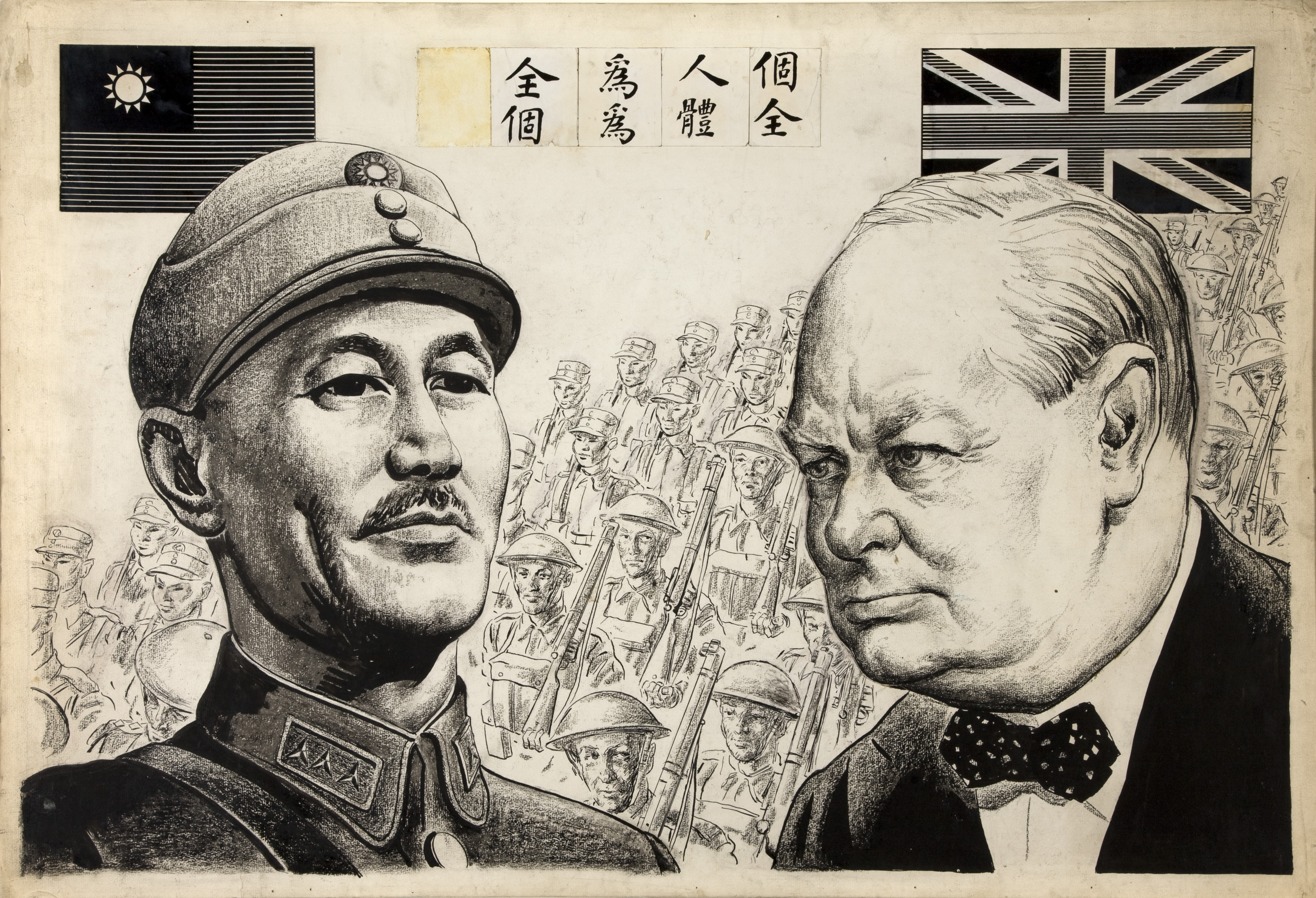
Chiang Kai-shek and Winston Churchill heads with Nationalist China flag and Union Jack

The Kuomintang used traditional Chinese religious ceremonies, and promulgated martyrdom. Kuomintang ideology subserved and promulgated the view that the souls of Party martyrs who died fighting for the Kuomintang, the revolution, and the party founder Sun Yat-sen were sent to heaven. Chiang Kai-shek believed that these martyrs witnessed events on Earth from heaven after their deaths.

Unlike Sun's Three Principles of the People which was heavily influenced by Western enlightenment theorists such as Henry George, Abraham Lincoln, Bertrand Russell, and John Stuart Mill, the traditional Chinese Confucian influence on Chiang's ideology is much stronger. Chiang rejected the Western progressive ideologies of individualism, liberalism, and the cultural aspects of Marxism. Therefore, Chiang is generally more culturally and socially conservative than Sun Yat-sen. Jay Taylor has described Chiang Kai-shek as a revolutionary nationalist and a "left-leaning Confucian-Jacobinist".

When the Northern Expedition was complete, Kuomintang Generals led by Chiang Kai-shek paid tribute to Sun's soul in heaven with a sacrificial ceremony at the Xiangshan Temple in Beijing in July 1928. Among the Kuomintang Generals present were the Muslim Generals Bai Chongxi and Ma Fuxiang.

Chiang Kai-shek considered both Han Chinese and all ethnic minorities of China, the Five Races Under One Union, as descendants of the Yellow Emperor, the mythical founder of the Chinese nation, and belonging to the Chinese Nation Zhonghua Minzu. He introduced this into Kuomintang ideology which was propagated into the educational system of the Republic of China.

Chiang, as a Chinese nationalist and a Confucian, was against the iconoclasm of the May Fourth Movement. Motivated by his sense of nationalism, he viewed some Western ideas as foreign and believed that the great introduction of Western ideas and literature, which the May Fourth Movement promoted, was not beneficial to China. He and Sun criticized the May Fourth intellectuals as corrupting the morals of China's youth.

Chiang Kai-shek once said:

If when I die, I am still a dictator, I will certainly go down into the oblivion of all dictators. If, on the other hand, I succeed in establishing a truly stable foundation for a democratic government, I will live forever in every home in China.

== Historical perception ==
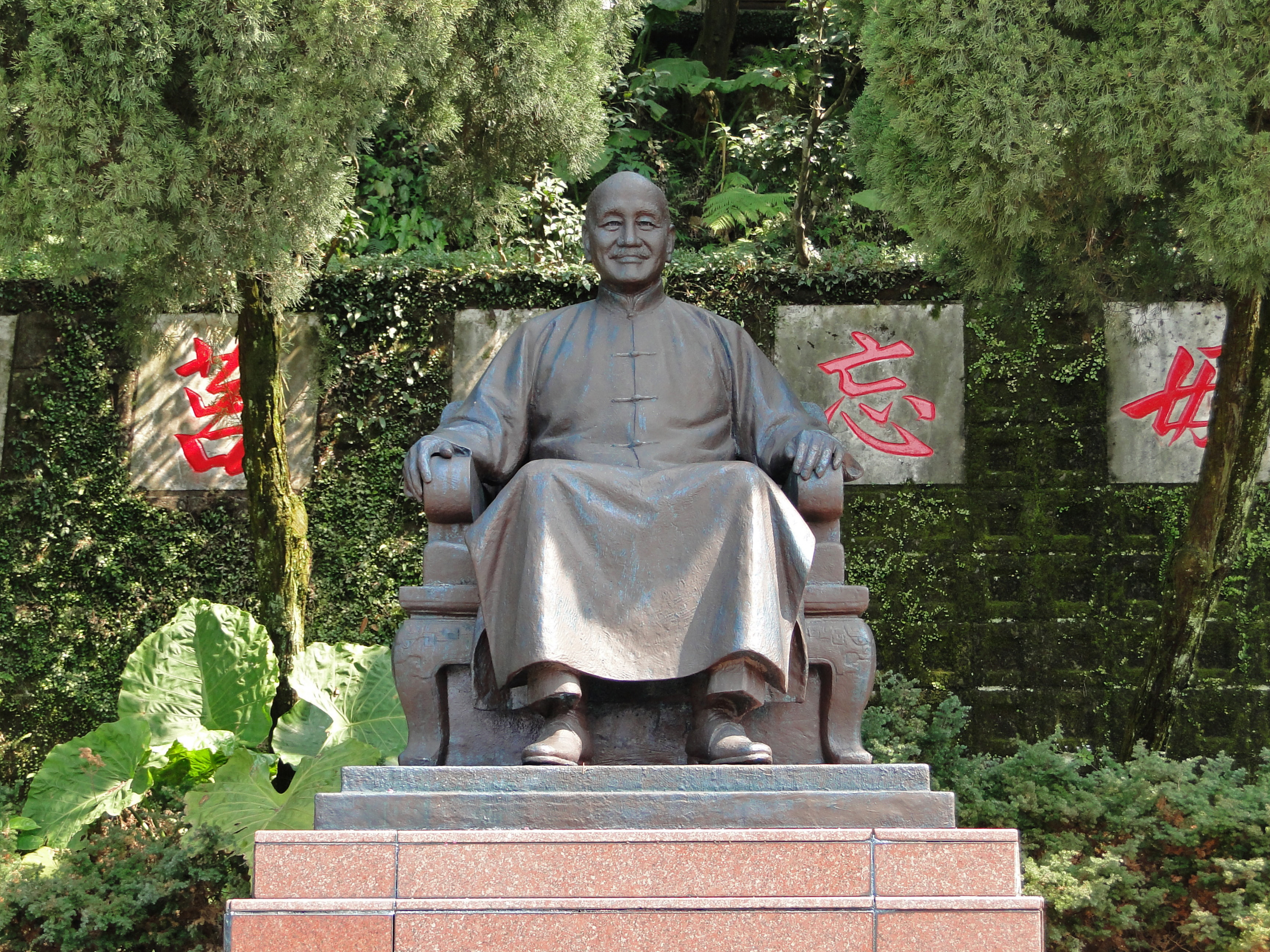
Statue of Chiang Kai-shek in Yangmingshan National Park, Taiwan

For some, Chiang's legacy was a national hero who achieved unification as leader of the Northern Expedition and as the leader against Japan's invasion, and for enduring without major aid, as Chiang called on his countrymen to fight to the "bitter end" until their ultimate victory against Japan in 1945. He was also champion of anti-communism during the formative years of the World Anti-Communist League. During the subsequent Cold War, he was seen as the leader who led Free China and the bulwark against a possible communist invasion.

Others see him in a darker light. Chiang was often perceived as "the man who lost China", criticized for his poor military skills, such as issuing unrealistic orders and persistently attempting to fight unwinnable battles, leading to the loss of his best troops. The historian Rudolph Rummel documented that Chiang's decisions led to millions of excess deaths from calamities such as persecution against actual or perceived communists and its conscription of soldiers, confiscation of food, and flooding of downstream regions of the Yellow River during the Second Sino-Japanese War. Within his lifetime, Chiang was derisively nicknamed "General Cash-My-Check" by American officials on account of his persistent requests for financial aid to fund his military efforts. His government was also accused of being corrupt and allying with known criminals such as Du Yuesheng for political and financial gains, and his critics often accuse him of fascism. In Taiwan, he ruled throughout a period of martial law. Some opponents charge that Chiang's efforts in developing the island were mostly to turn it into a strong base from which to recover mainland China and that he had little regard for the Taiwanese people.

Unlike Chiang's son Chiang Ching-kuo, who is respected across the political spectrum, Chiang Kai-shek's image is perceived rather negatively in Taiwan. He was rated the lowest in two opinion polls about the perception of former presidents. His popularity in Taiwan is divided along political lines, enjoying better support in the Kuomintang (KMT) while being widely unpopular among Democratic Progressive Party (DPP) voters and those who blame him for the thousands killed during the February 28 Incident and criticise his dictatorial rule. The DPP has actively pursued transitional justice regarding Chiang Kai-shek's authoritarian rule through landmark legislation such as the 2017 Act on Promoting Transitional Justice, which legally mandates the removal of symbols of authoritarianism that prompted the takedown of hundreds of Chiang Kai-shek statues and the rebranding of institutions across the island. The move sparked condemnation from the KMT, who argued that the move was a partisan act aimed at demonising Chiang Kai-shek and the KMT as well as pushing de-sinicization that erased Chiang's nuanced legacy and pushing a broader agenda of severing cultural and historical ties with mainland China as groundwork for eventual independence.

In contrast, his image has partially improved in mainland China. He had been portrayed as a villain and a "bourgeoisie reactionary lackey" who fought against the "liberation" of China by the Chinese Communist Party (CCP), but since the 2000s, state media and Chinese popular culture have depicted him in a less negative manner. For example, many praised the 2009 movie sponsored by the CCP, The Founding of a Republic, for moving away from casting Chiang as 'evil' versus Mao and emphasizing instead that the contingencies of war led the communists to victory. In the context of the Second Sino-Japanese War, aspects of Chiang's trip to India, or meeting with Roosevelt and Churchill in Cairo can be viewed positively according to the CCP. The shift also takes into account Chiang's commitment to a unified China and his stance against Taiwanese independence. Chiang's ancestral home in Fenghua, Zhejiang, has become a museum and tourist attraction. Historian Rana Mitter notes that the displays inside were very positive about Chiang's role during the Second Sino-Japanese War.

Mitter further observed that, ironically, today's China is closer to Chiang's vision than to Mao's and wrote, "One can imagine Chiang Kai-shek's ghost wandering round China today nodding in approval, while Mao's ghost follows behind him, moaning at the destruction of his vision". Liang Shuming opined that Chiang Kai-shek's "greatest contribution was to make the CCP successful. If he had been a bit more trustworthy, if his character was somewhat better, the CCP would have been unable to beat him". Some Chinese historians argue that the main determinants for Chiang's defeat were not corruption or the lack of US support, but his decision to start the civil war with 70% of government expenditures in the military, his overestimation of the Nationalist forces equipped with US arms, and the loss of popularity and morales of his soldiers. Other historians argue that his failure was largely caused by external factors outside of Chiang's control. They include the refusal of the Truman administration to support Chiang by withdrawing aid, the foisting of an arms embargo by George C. Marshall, the failed pursuit of a détente between the nationalists and the communists, the American push for a coalition government with the CCP, and the USSR's consistent aid and support for the CCP during the civil war.

== Family ==
=== Wives ===
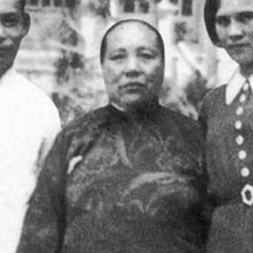
Mao Fumei (1882–1939), who died in the Second Sino-Japanese War during a bombardment, is the mother of his son and successor Chiang Ching-kuo.

Yao Yecheng (1889–1972), who came to Taiwan and died in Taipei

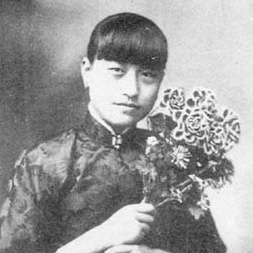
Chen Jieru ("Jennie", 1906–1971), who lived in Shanghai, but moved to Hong Kong later and died there

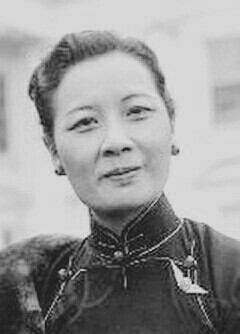
Soong Mei-ling (1898–2003), who moved to the United States after Chiang Kai-shek's death, is arguably his most famous wife even though they had no children together.

In 1901, in an arranged marriage at age 14, Chiang was married to Mao Fumei, an illiterate villager five years his senior. Chiang and Mao had one son, Ching-kuo. While married to Mao, Chiang adopted either one or two concubines (concubinage was still a common practice for well-to-do, non-Christian males in China): he took Yao Yecheng (姚冶誠, 1887–1966) as concubine in late 1912 and married Chen Jieru (1906–1971) in December 1921. While he was still living in Shanghai, Chiang and Yao adopted a son, Wei-kuo. Chen adopted a daughter in 1924, named Yaoguang, who later took her mother's surname. Chen's autobiography rejected the idea that she had been a concubine. Chen said that, by the time she married Chiang, he had already divorced Yao, and that Chen was therefore his wife.

According to the memoirs of Chen Jieru, Chiang's second wife, she contracted gonorrhea from Chiang soon after their marriage. He told her that he acquired this disease after separating from his first wife and living with his concubine Yao Yecheng, as well as with many other women he consorted with. His doctor explained to her that Chiang had sex with her before completing his treatment for the disease. As a result, both Chiang and Chen Jieru believed that they had become sterile; however, a purported miscarriage by Soong Mei-ling in August 1928 would, if it actually occurred, cast serious doubt on whether this was true.

=== Family tree ===
Chiang family tree

Soong May‑ling 宋美齡	Mao Fumei 毛福梅	Chiang Kai‑shek 蔣介石	Yao Yecheng 姚冶誠	Chen Jieru 陳潔如
Faina Chiang Fang‑liang 蔣方良	Chiang Ching-kuo 蔣經國	Chang Ya‑juo 章亞若 (mistress)	Shih Chin‑i 石靜宜	Chiang Wei‑kuo 蔣緯國 (adopted)	Chiu Ju‑hsüeh 丘如雪	Chen Yao‑kuang 陳瑶光 (adopted)
Alan Chiang Hsiao‑wen 蔣孝文	Amy Chiang Hsiao‑chang 蔣孝章	Alex Chiang Hsiao‑wu 蔣孝武	Eddie Chiang Hsiao‑yung 蔣孝勇	Winston Chang Hsiao‑tzu 章孝慈	John Chiang Hsiao‑yen 蔣孝嚴	Chiang Hsiao‑kang 蔣孝剛
Nancy Xu Nai‑jin 徐乃錦	Yu Yang‑ho 俞揚和	Wang Zhang‑shi 汪長詩	Michelle Tsai Hui‑mei 蔡惠媚	Elizabeth Fang Chi‑yi 方智怡	Chao Chung‑te 趙申德	Helen Huang Mei‑lun 黃美倫	Wang Yi‑hui 王倚惠
Theodore Yu Tsu‑sheng 俞祖聲	Chang Ching‑sung 章勁松	Chang Yo‑chu 章友菊	Vivian Chiang Hui‑lan 蔣惠蘭	Chiang Hui‑yün 蔣惠筠	Chiang Wan-an 蔣萬安
Chiang Yo‑mei 蔣友梅	Alexandra Chiang Yo‑lan 蔣友蘭	Johnathan Chiang Yo‑sung 蔣友松	Demos Chiang Yo‑bo 蔣友柏	Edward Chiang Yo‑chang 蔣友常	Andrew Chiang Yo‑ching 蔣友青	Chiang Yo‑chüan 蔣友娟	Chiang Yo‑chieh 蔣友捷

Notes
- Dashed lines represent marriages
- Dotted lines represent extra-marital relationships and adoptions
- Solid lines represent descendants

== Honours ==
Chiang Kai-shek's seal as Knight of the Royal Order of the Seraphim

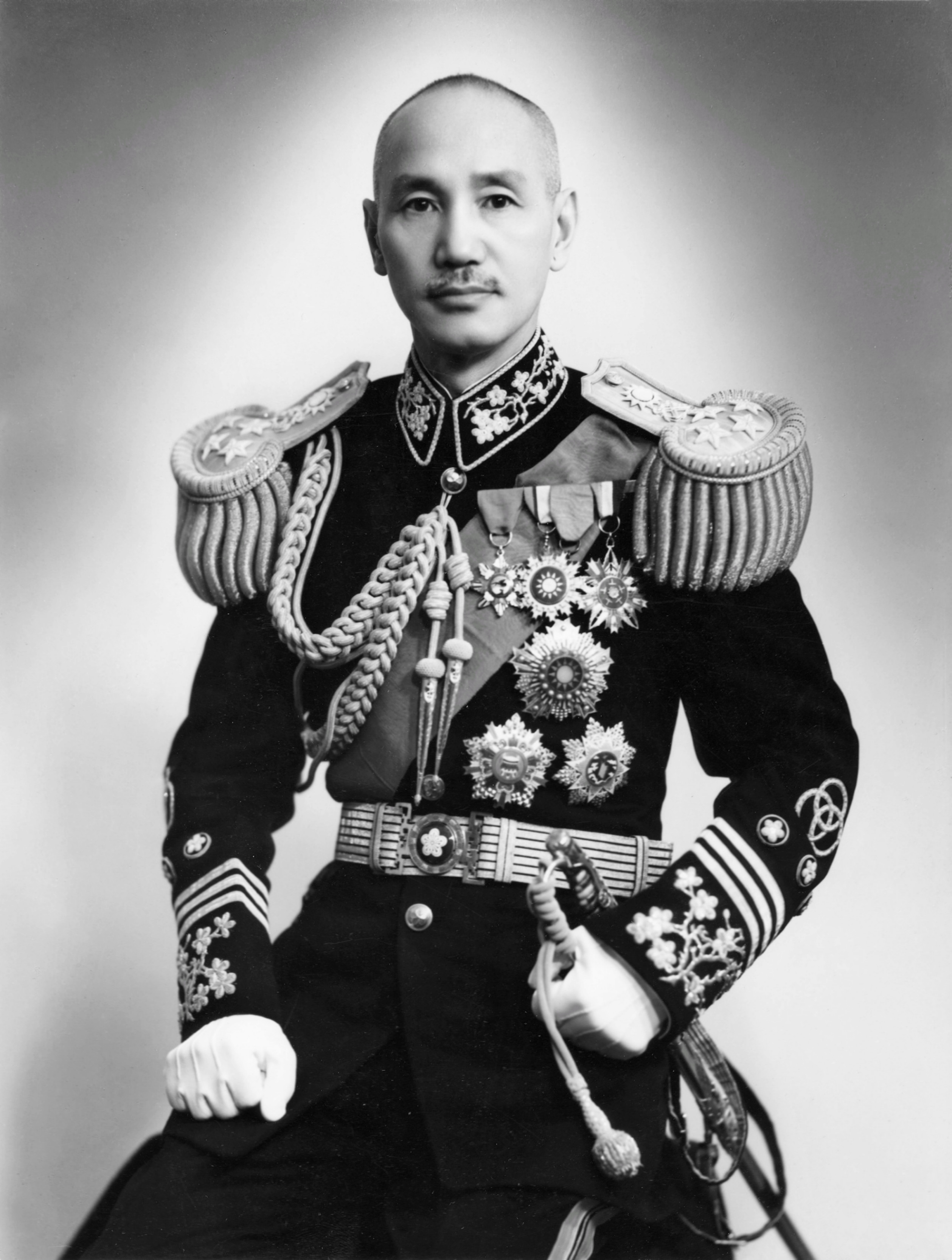
Chiang Kai-shek with his decorations, 10 October 1943

Republic of China national honours

- Order of National Glory
- Order of Blue Sky and White Sun
- Order of the Sacred Tripod
- Order of Brilliant Jade
- Order of Propitious Clouds
- Order of the Cloud and Banner
- Order of Brilliant Star
- Honour Sabre of the Awakened Lion

Foreign honours

- Dominican Republic:
  - Order of Merit of Duarte, Sánchez and Mella (January 1940)
  - Order of Christopher Columbus (July 1948)
  - Grand Cross of the Order of Christopher Columbus (October 1971)
- Philippines:
  - Chief Commander of the Philippine Legion of Honor (1949)
  - Grand Collar of the Ancient Order of Sikatuna (2 May 1960)
- United States:
  - Chief Commander of the Legion of Merit (9 July 1943)
  - Distinguished Service Medal (U.S. Army) (March 1946)
- South Korea:
  - Order of Merit for National Foundation (27 November 1953)
  - Grand Order of Mugunghwa (15 February 1966)
- Thailand: Order of the Rajamitrabhorn (5 June 1963)
- Colombia: Order of Boyaca (October 1963)
- United Kingdom: Order of the Bath (1941)
- Peru: Order of the Sun of Peru (October 1944)
- Czechoslovakia: Order of the White Lion (30 May 1945)
- France: Legion of Honour (9 January 1945)
- Chile: Order of Merit (Chile) (29 January 1944)
- Mexico: Order of the Aztec Eagle (April 1945)
- Greece: Order of the Redeemer (22 March 1957)
- Jordan: Supreme Order of the Renaissance (9 March 1959)
- Brazil: Order of the Southern Cross (1944)
- Italy: Order of Saints Maurice and Lazarus (April 1948)
- Sweden: Royal Order of the Seraphim (4 June 1948)
- Spain:
  - Order of Isabella the Catholic (May 1936)
  - Order of Civil Merit (1965)
- Venezuela: Order of the Liberator (July 1954)
- Vietnam (Nguyễn dynasty): Kim Khanh Medal (January 1960)
- Belgium: Order of Leopold (Belgium) (4 June 1946)
- Malawi: Order of the Lion (Malawi) (5 August 1967)
- Bolivia: Order of the Condor of the Andes (March 1966)
- Gambia: Order of the Republic of The Gambia (November 1972)
- Argentina: Order of the Liberator General San Martín (October 1960)
- Guatemala: Order of the Quetzal (7 December 1956)
- Nicaragua:
  - National Order of Miguel Larreynaga (November 1974)
  - Order of Ruben Dario (October 1958)
- Panama: Order of Vasco Núñez de Balboa (February 1960)
- Paraguay: Collar of Marshal Francisco Solano Lopez Grade of National Order of Merit (May 1962)

== Selected writings ==
- Chiang, May-ling Soong; Chiang, Kai- (1937). General Chiang Kai-shek; the Account of the Fortnight in Sian When the Fate of China Hung in the Balance. Garden City, New York: Doubleday, Doran. Includes foreword, by J. Leighton Stuart.—What China has faced, by Mme. Chiang Kai-shek.—Sian: a coup d'e´tat, by Mme. Chiang Kai-shek.—A fortnight in Sian: extracts from a diary, by Chiang Kai-shek.—The Generalissimo's admonition to Chiang Hsueh-liang (sic: i.e. Zhang Xueliang) and Yang Hu-chen (sic: i.e. Yang Hucheng) prior to his departure from Sian.—Names of Chinese persons and places mentioned in the story and diary.
- ———— (1947). China's Destiny. Translated by Wang Chung-hui. New York: The Macmillan Company. Authorized translation of 中国之命运 (Zhongguo zhi mingyun) (1943). . Introduction by Lin Yutang.
- ———— (1947). Chiang Kai-Shek: China's Destiny and Chinese Economic Theory. New York: Roy.. Unauthorized translation of 中国之命运 (Zhongguo zhi mingyun) (1943) by Philip Jaffe, with his notes and extensive critical commentary.
- The Collected Wartime Messages Of Generalissimo Chiang Kai Shek at Netarchive
- ——— (1957). Soviet Russia in China; a Summing-up at Seventy. New York: Farrar, Straus and Cudahy.
- —, Works at Internet Archive HERE

== See also ==
- Chiang Kai-shek International Airport
- Chiang Kai-shek Memorial Hall – National monument in Taipei, Taiwan
- Chiang Kai-shek Memorial Song
- Chiang Kai-shek statues – Statues of the President of the Republic of China
- Cihu Mausoleum
- Free area of the Republic of China
- Guesthouses of Chiang Kai-shek
- Nationalist government – Government led by the Kuomintang from 1925–1948 in mainland China
- Republic of China Armed Forces – Military forces of Taiwan
- Shilin Official Residence – Residence in Shilin, Taipei, Taiwan
- Timeline of Chiang Kai-shek

== Notes ==
Political offices
Preceded by Tan Yankai	Chairman of the National Government of China; 1928–1931	Succeeded by Lin Sen
Preceded by T. V. Soong	Premier of the Republic of China; 1930–1931	Succeeded by Chen Mingshu
New title	Chairman of the National Military Council; 1932–1946	Succeeded by Bai Chongxi as Ministerof National Defense
Preceded by Wang Jingwei	Premier of the Republic of China; 1935–1938	Succeeded by H. H. Kung
Preceded by H. H. Kung	Premier of the Republic of China; 1939–1945	Succeeded by T. V. Soong
Preceded by Lin Sen	Chairman of the National Government of the Republic of China; 1943–1948	Succeeded by Himself; As President of the Republic of China
Preceded by T. V. Soong	Premier of the Republic of China; 1947	Succeeded by Zhang Qun
Preceded by Himself as Chairman of the National Government of China	President of the Republic of China; 1948–1975; Li Zongren (Acting); 21 January 1949 to 1 March 1950	Succeeded by Yen Chia-kan
Party political offices
Preceded by Zhang Renjie	Chairman of the Central Executive Committee of the Kuomintang; 1926–1927	Succeeded by Woo Tsin-hang and Li Yuying
Preceded by Hu Hanmin	Chairman of the Central Executive Committee of the Kuomintang; 1936–1938	Succeeded by Himself as Director General of the Kuomintang
Preceded by Himself as Chairman of the Kuomintang	Director-General of the Kuomintang; 1938–1975	Succeeded by Chiang Ching-kuo as Chairman of the Kuomintang
Military offices
New title	Commander-in-chief of the National Revolutionary Army; 1925–1947	Office abolished
Academic offices
New title	Commandant of the Whampoa Military Academy; 1924–1947	Succeeded by Guan Linzheng
