= Memorial Park =

Memorial Park may refer to either a public park dedicated in memorial to an event, or a cemetery (modern term for such):

== Parks ==
=== Australia ===
- Bulimba Memorial Park, Bulimba, Brisbane, Queensland
- Toowong Memorial Park, Toowoong, Brisbane, Queensland
- Yeronga Memorial Park, Yeronga, Brisbane, Queensland
- Kangaroo Ground War Memorial Park, Melbourne, Victoria

=== Bosnia and Herzegovina ===
- Vraca Memorial Park, Sarajevo

=== Canada ===
- Memorial Provincial Park, Winnipeg, Manitoba

=== China ===
- King George V Memorial Park, Kowloon

=== Denmark ===
- Jutland Memorial Park; see Sea War Museum Jutland#War memorial

=== France ===
- Australian Memorial Park, near Fromelles

=== Hungary ===
- Memorial Park, Budapest also called Memento Park

=== India ===
- Ambedkar Memorial Park
- Saraighat War Memorial Park
- Smritivan Earthquake Memorial and Museum

=== Ireland ===
- Stardust Memorial Park, Coolock, Dublin

=== Japan ===
- Asahiyama Memorial Park, Chūō-ku, Sapporo, Hokkaidō
- Hiroshima Peace Memorial Park

=== Malaysia ===
- Sandakan Memorial Park, Sandakan, Sabah

=== Philippines ===
- MacArthur Landing Memorial National Park

=== Poland ===
- The Great Synagogue Memorial Park in Oświęcim

=== New Zealand ===
- Memorial Park, Hamilton
- Memorial Park, Lower Hutt, a stadium in New Zealand
- Memorial Park, Manurewa, a stadium in New Zealand
- Memorial Park, Masterton, a stadium in New Zealand
- Memorial Park, Mosgiel
- Memorial Park, Motueka, a stadium in Motueka, Tasman
- Memorial Park, Palmerston North, a stadium in New Zealand
- Memorial Park, Tauranga

=== Serbia ===
- Memorial Park Jajinci
- Šumarice Memorial Park

=== Taiwan ===
- Barclay Memorial Park, Tainan
- Chiang Wei-shui Memorial Park, Taipei
- Green Island White Terror Memorial Park, Taitung
- Kinmen Peace Memorial Park, Kinmen
- Military Memorial Park, Taichung
- Tang Te-chang Memorial Park, Tainan
- War and Peace Memorial Park and Theme Hall, Kaohsiung
- War and Peace Memorial Park Exhibition Center, Lienchiang
- Wushe Incident Memorial Park, Nantou
- Xiaolin Village Memorial Park, Kaohsiung
- Zhenge Daidan Memorial Park, Lienchiang

=== Trinidad and Tobago ===
- Memorial Park, Port of Spain

=== United Kingdom ===
- Forster Memorial Park, Lewisham, London
- War Memorial Park, Coventry

=== United States ===
==== Alaska ====
- Growden Memorial Park, Fairbanks
- Adair-Kennedy Memorial Park, Juneau

==== Arizona ====
- Wesley Bolin Memorial Plaza, Phoenix

==== California ====
- Memorial Park (San Mateo County, California)
- Memorial Park station, on the A Line of Los Angeles Metro Rail
- Memorial Park (Hayward, California)
- Sierra Madre Memorial Park in Sierra Madre, California
- Will Rogers Memorial Park, Beverly Hills
- Hart Memorial Park, Bakersfield
- Donner Memorial State Park California
- Leo J. Ryan Memorial Park, Foster City
- Santa Cruz Memorial Park, Santa Cruz

==== Colorado ====
- Memorial Park, Colorado Springs

==== Connecticut ====
- Harkness Memorial State Park, Waterford

==== Florida ====
- Memorial Park (Jacksonville)
- Ronnie Van Zant Memorial Park, Lake Asbury, Clay County

==== Georgia ====
- Hillcrest Memorial Park Cemetery, Augusta, Georgia
- Memorial Park (Athens, Georgia)
- Macon Memorial Park Cemetery, Macon, Georgia

==== Iowa ====
- Veterans Memorial Park (Davenport, Iowa)

==== Massachusetts ====
- Seekonk Veterans Memorial Park, Seekonk
- War Memorial Park (West Bridgewater, Massachusetts)
- Barnes Memorial Park, Dedham

==== Missouri ====
- Memorial Park (Raymore)

==== Nebraska ====
- Memorial Park (Omaha)

==== New York ====
- Theodore Roosevelt Memorial Park Oyster Bay

==== North Carolina ====
- Julian Price Memorial Park North Carolina

==== Northern Mariana Islands ====
- American Memorial Park, island of Saipan

==== Oklahoma ====
- Washington Irving Memorial Park and Arboretum, Bixby

==== Oregon ====
- Klamath Falls Veterans Memorial Park

==== Pennsylvania ====
- Memorial Park Site Pennsylvania

==== Rhode Island ====
- Miantonomi Memorial Park, Newport

==== Texas ====
- Memorial Park, Houston

==== West Virginia ====
- Memorial Park, Huntington

==== Wyoming ====
- George Washington Memorial Park (Jackson, Wyoming)

== Cemeteries ==
=== Australia ===
- Eastern Suburbs Memorial Park, Sydney, New South Wales
- Fawkner Crematorium and Memorial Park, Melbourne, Victoria
- Memorial Park Cemetery (Albany, Western Australia)

=== Canada ===
- Central Memorial Park, Calgary, Alberta

=== Denmark ===
- Ryvangen Memorial Park, Copenhagen

=== Malaysia ===
- Nirvana Memorial Park, Semenyih, Selangor
- Xiao En Memorial Park, Nilai, Negeri Sembilan

=== New Zealand ===
- Bolton Street Memorial Park, Wellington

=== Philippines ===
- Forest Lake Memorial Parks
- Loyola Memorial Park, Marikina
- Manila Memorial Park – Sucat, Parañaque

=== Taiwan ===
- Xiaolin Village Memorial Park, Kaohsiung

=== United Kingdom ===
- War Memorial Park, Coventry, England

=== United States ===
==== Alaska ====
- Anchorage Memorial Park

==== Arizona ====
- Pioneer and Military Memorial Park, Phoenix

==== California ====
- Forest Lawn Memorial Park (Glendale)
- Forest Lawn Memorial-Parks & Mortuaries (list)
- Grand View Memorial Park Cemetery, Glendale
- Hillside Memorial Park Cemetery, Culver City
- Mount Sinai Memorial Park Cemetery, Los Angeles
- Westwood Village Memorial Park Cemetery, Los Angeles
- Valhalla Memorial Park Cemetery, North Hollywood
- Desert Memorial Park, Cathedral City
- Memorial Park (San Mateo County, California)
- Eden Memorial Park Cemetery, San Fernando Valley of Los Angeles
- El Camino Memorial Park, San Diego
- Alta Mesa Memorial Park Palo Alto
- Oakwood Memorial Park Cemetery, Chatsworth
- Oakwood Memorial Park (Santa Cruz, California)
- Cypress Lawn Memorial Park Colma
- Greenwood Memorial Park (San Diego)
- Oak Hill Memorial Park, San Jose, Santa Clara County
- Skylawn Memorial Park (San Mateo, California)
- Woodlawn Memorial Park (Colma, California)
- Hills of Eternity Memorial Park, Colma

==== Hawaii ====
- Valley of the Temples Memorial Park, Hawaiian island of Oʻahu

==== Michigan ====
- Glen Eden Lutheran Memorial Park, Livonia

==== New Jersey ====
- George Washington Memorial Park (Paramus, New Jersey)

==== Ohio ====
- Memorial Park (Columbus)

==== Oklahoma ====
- Memorial Park Cemetery (Oklahoma City)

==== Tennessee ====
- Memorial Park Cemetery (Memphis, Tennessee)
- Woodlawn Memorial Park (Nashville, Tennessee)

==== Texas ====
- Greenwood Memorial Park (Fort Worth, Texas)

==== Washington ====
- Evergreen Washelli Memorial Park, Seattle
- Greenwood Memorial Park (Renton, Washington)

== Other ==
- Memorial Park (Los Angeles Metro station)

== See also ==
- Memorial Field (disambiguation)
