= Chiang Ching-kuo Memorial Hall =

Memorial hall in Jinning, Kinmen, Taiwan

- 蔣經國先生紀念館
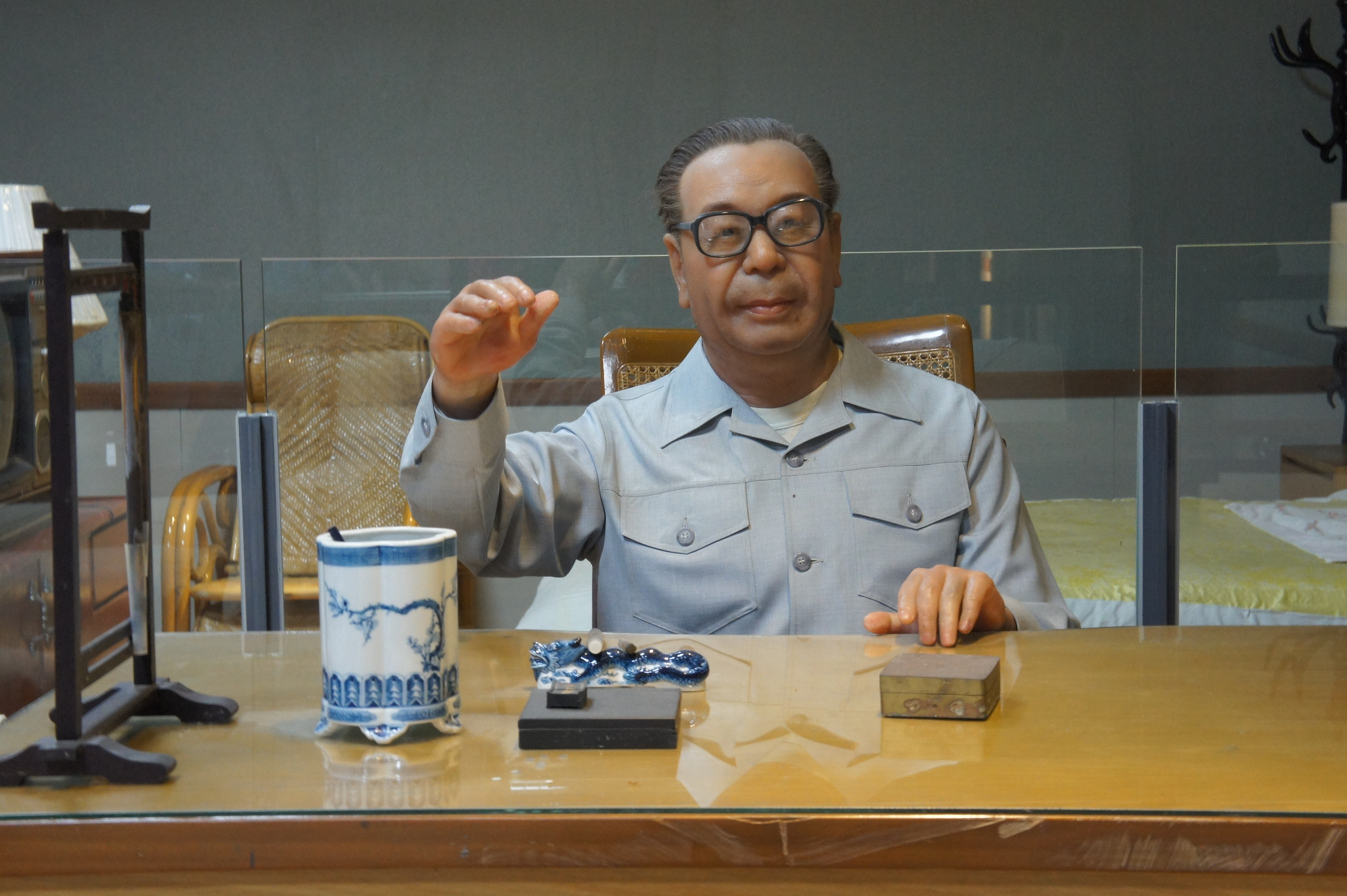
- Interactive map of the Chiang Ching-kuo Memorial Hall area

General information
- Type: memorial hall
- Location: Jinning, Kinmen, Taiwan
- Coordinates: 24°26′14.4″N 118°21′15.3″E
- Opened: 1989

The Chiang Ching-kuo Memorial Hall (traditional Chinese: 蔣經國先生紀念館; simplified Chinese: 蒋经国先生纪念馆; pinyin: Jiǎng Jīngguó Xiānshēng Jìniàn Guǎn) is a memorial hall dedicated to former President of the Republic of China Chiang Ching-kuo located in Jinning Township, Kinmen County, Taiwan.

== History ==
The memorial hall was built in 1989. On 6 July 2008, the memorial hall was reopened in a ceremony attended by legislator Chen Fu-hai, Fujian Province Governor Hsueh Hsiang-chuan, Magistrate Lee Chu-feng, local officials, elected representatives and Chiang Ching-kuo's friends. The memorial hall was closed for renovation from 20 June until 30 November 2019 and was reopened at the end of 2019.

== Exhibitions ==
The exhibition area of the memorial hall is divided into two part, which are the life of Chiang Ching-kuo and Chiang Ching-kuo's time in Kinmen.

== See also ==
- List of tourist attractions in Taiwan
- Touliao Mausoleum
