= Touliao Mausoleum =

Mausoleum of Chiang Ching-kuo

- 大溪陵寢
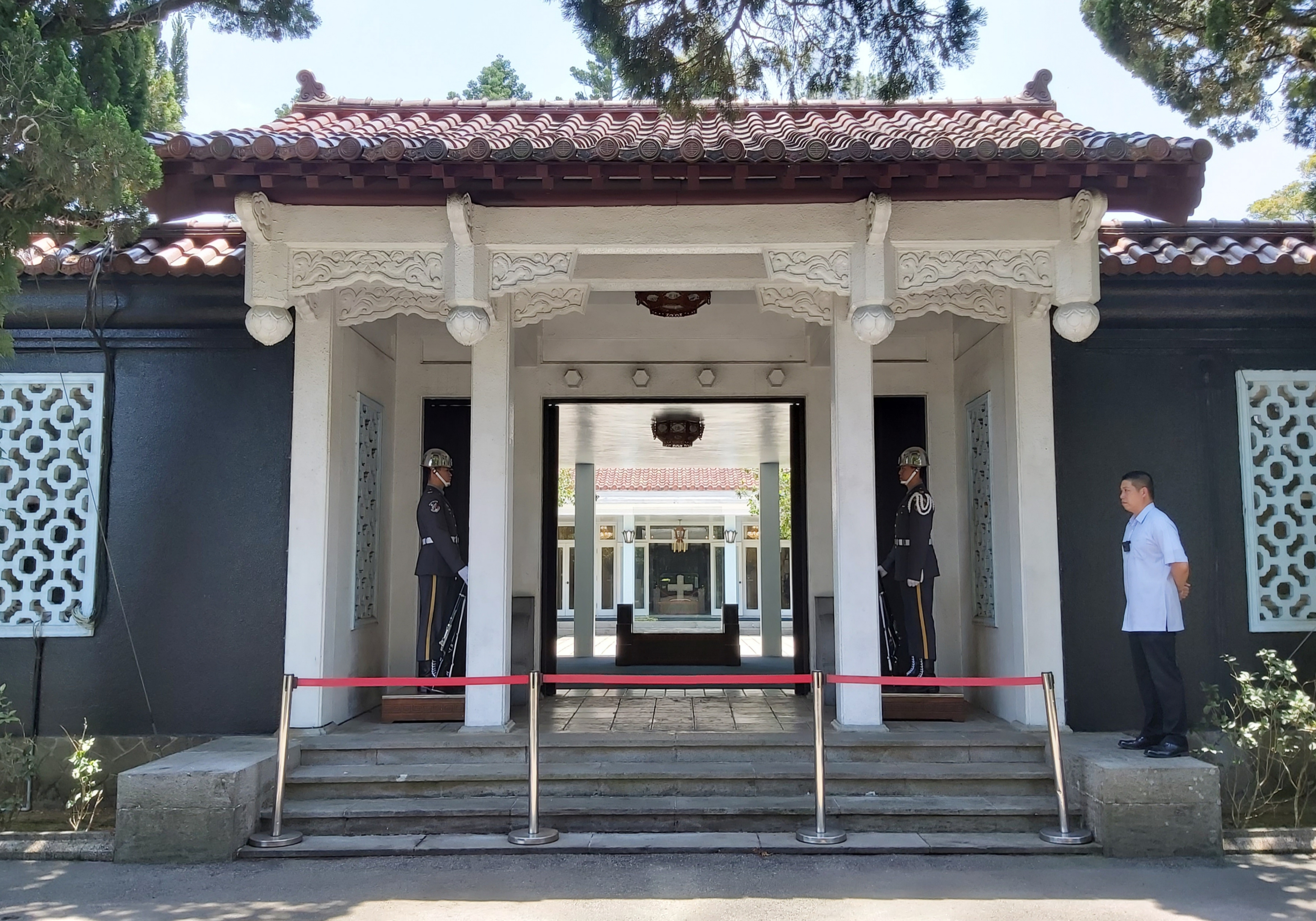
- Interactive map of Touliao Mausoleum

Details
- Established: 17 July 1966
- Location: Daxi, Taoyuan City, Taiwan
- Coordinates: 24°50′54″N 121°17′10″E
- Type: Mausoleum

Touliao Mausoleum or Daxi Mausoleum (Chinese: 大溪陵寢; pinyin: Dàxī Língqǐn) is the resting place for Republic of China President Chiang Ching-kuo located in Daxi District, Taoyuan City, Taiwan.

== History ==
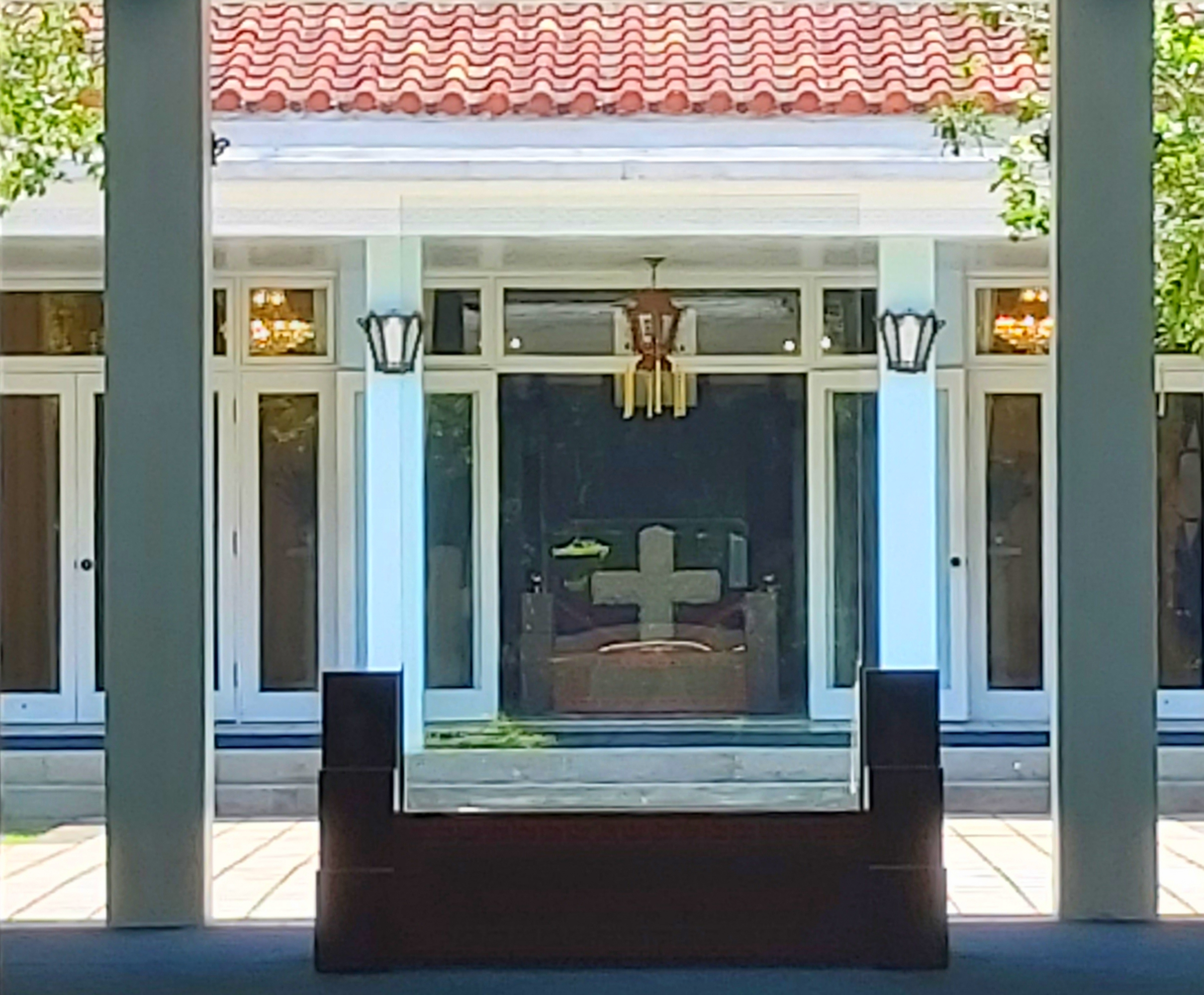
Main Hall.

Chiang Ching-kuo lies in state.

The Mausoleum building was originally known as the "Touliao guesthouse" and was constructed by RSEA Engineering and completed on July 17, 1966. The building's function was later changed to the presidential palace archives, and then to the Chiang family collection of information.

When Chiang Ching-kuo died on January 13, 1988, preparations were made to bring his body here for interment on January 30. The name of the building was subsequently renamed to Daxi Mausoleum.

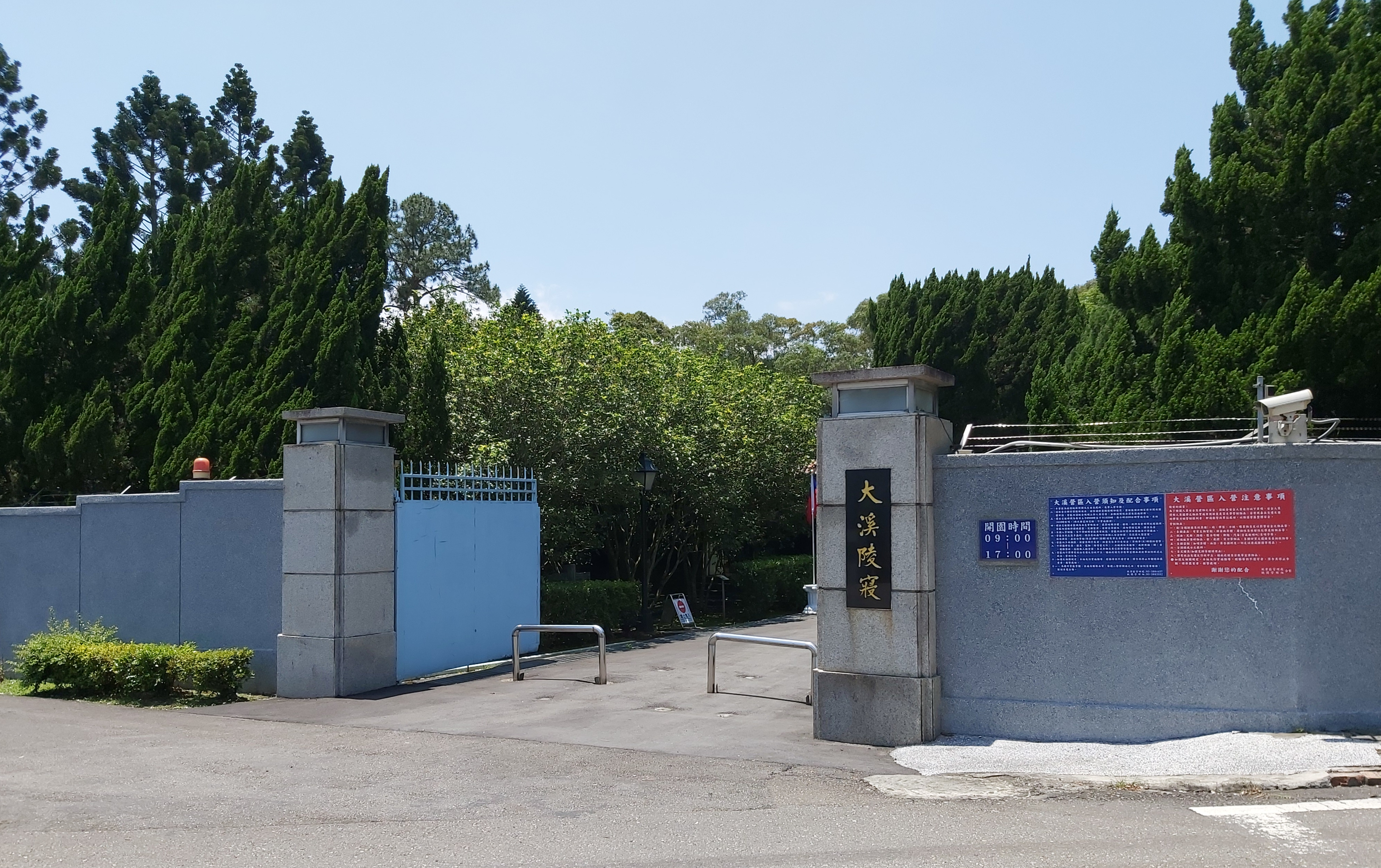
Entrance of the Mausoleum

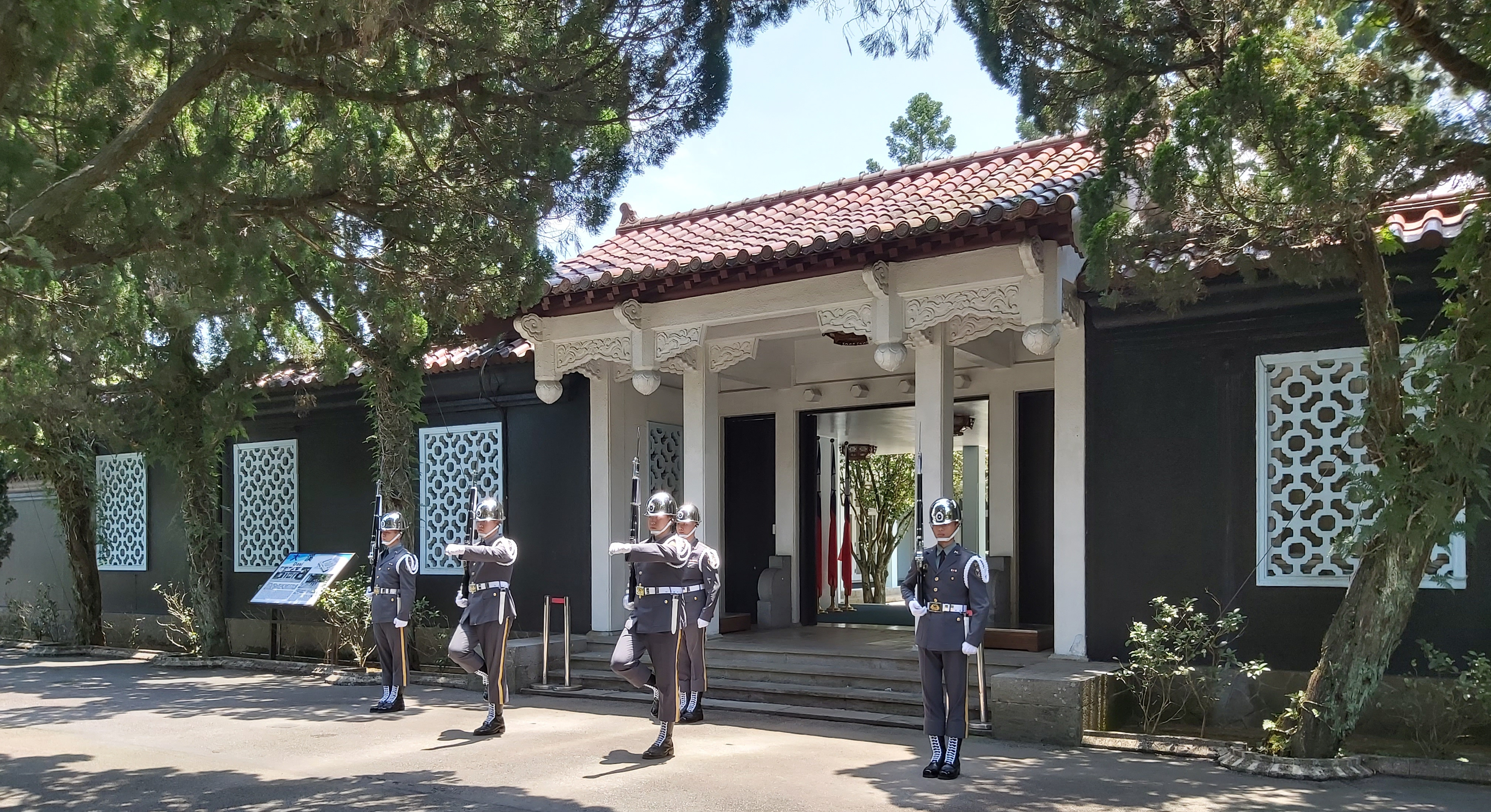
A guard mounting ceremony in front of the Mausoleum

On January 13, 2001, the Taoyuan County Cultural Affairs Bureau announced the Mausoleum as a regional historic building. In 2006, the Taoyuan County government combined the Jiaobanshan villa, Cihu Presidential Burial Place, and Touliao Mausoleum into the "Chiang's Cultural Park". The Touliao Mausoleum building is about one kilometer from the Cihu Presidential Burial Place building. The two places are now linked by a footpath.

In 2004, a request was made to move Chiang Ching-kuo's remains, along with those of his father, Chiang Kai-shek to Wuzhi Mountain Military Cemetery for interment in newly built tombs there. However, political disputes held up the reinterment process. As of 2016, the reinterment has not occurred.

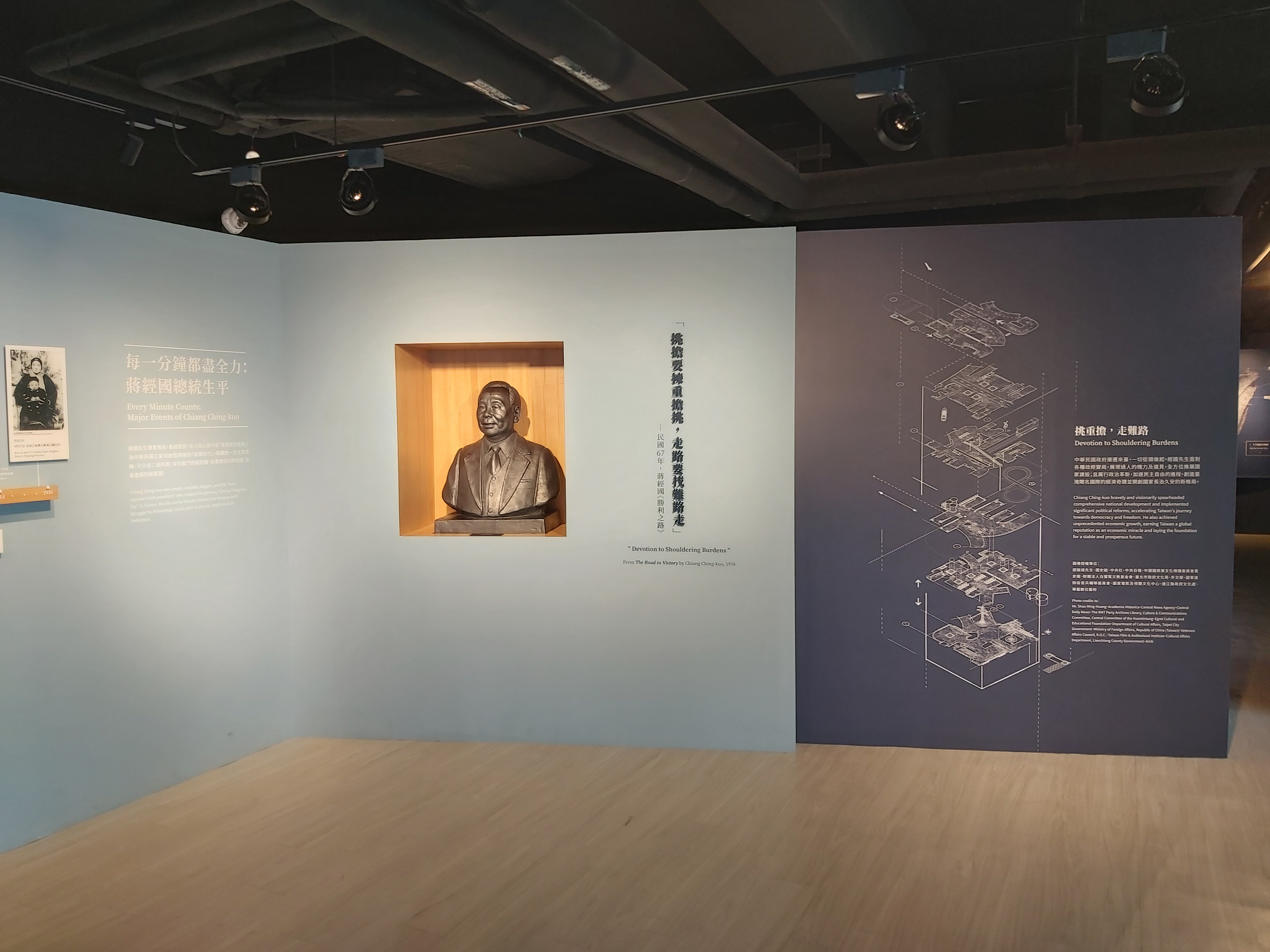
Chiang Ching-kuo Memorial Hall

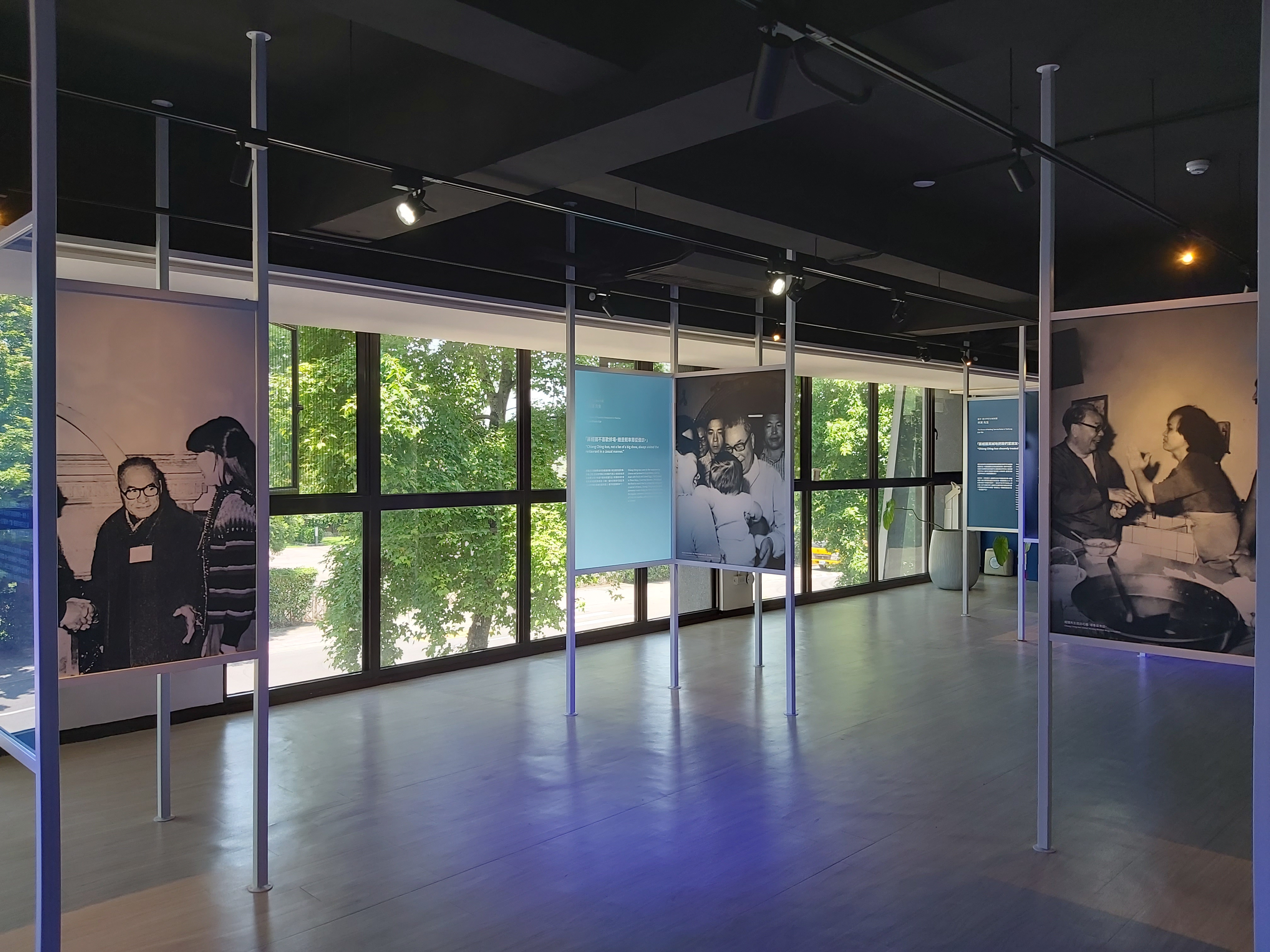
Interior of Chiang Ching-kuo Memorial Hall

== See also ==
- Ching-kuo Memorial Hall
- Chiang Ching-kuo Memorial Hall
- Sun Yat-sen Mausoleum
- Cihu Mausoleum
- Wuzhi Mountain Military Cemetery
- Chen Tsyr-shiou Memorial Park (Former Tomb and Memorial Museum of Chen Cheng, demolished in 1995)
- Mausoleum of Mao Zedong
