= Ci Lake =

Lake in Jinning, Kinmen, Taiwan

- 慈湖 (Chinese)

- Taiwan
- Location: Jinning, Kinmen, Taiwan
- Coordinates: 24°28′4.3″N 118°18′12.1″E
- Type: lake
- Built: 1969
- Surface area: 120 hectares (300 acres)

The Ci Lake (Chinese: 慈湖; pinyin: Cí Hú) is a lake in Jinning Township, Kinmen County, Taiwan.

== History ==
The lake was created in 1969 for military strategic purpose by constructing a levee.

== Geology ==
The lake spans over an area of 120 hectares and is primarily used for fish farming.

== See also ==
- Geography of Taiwan
