= Cihu Mausoleum =

Coordinates: 24.8422°N 121.2993°E

Cihu Mausoleum 慈湖陵寢
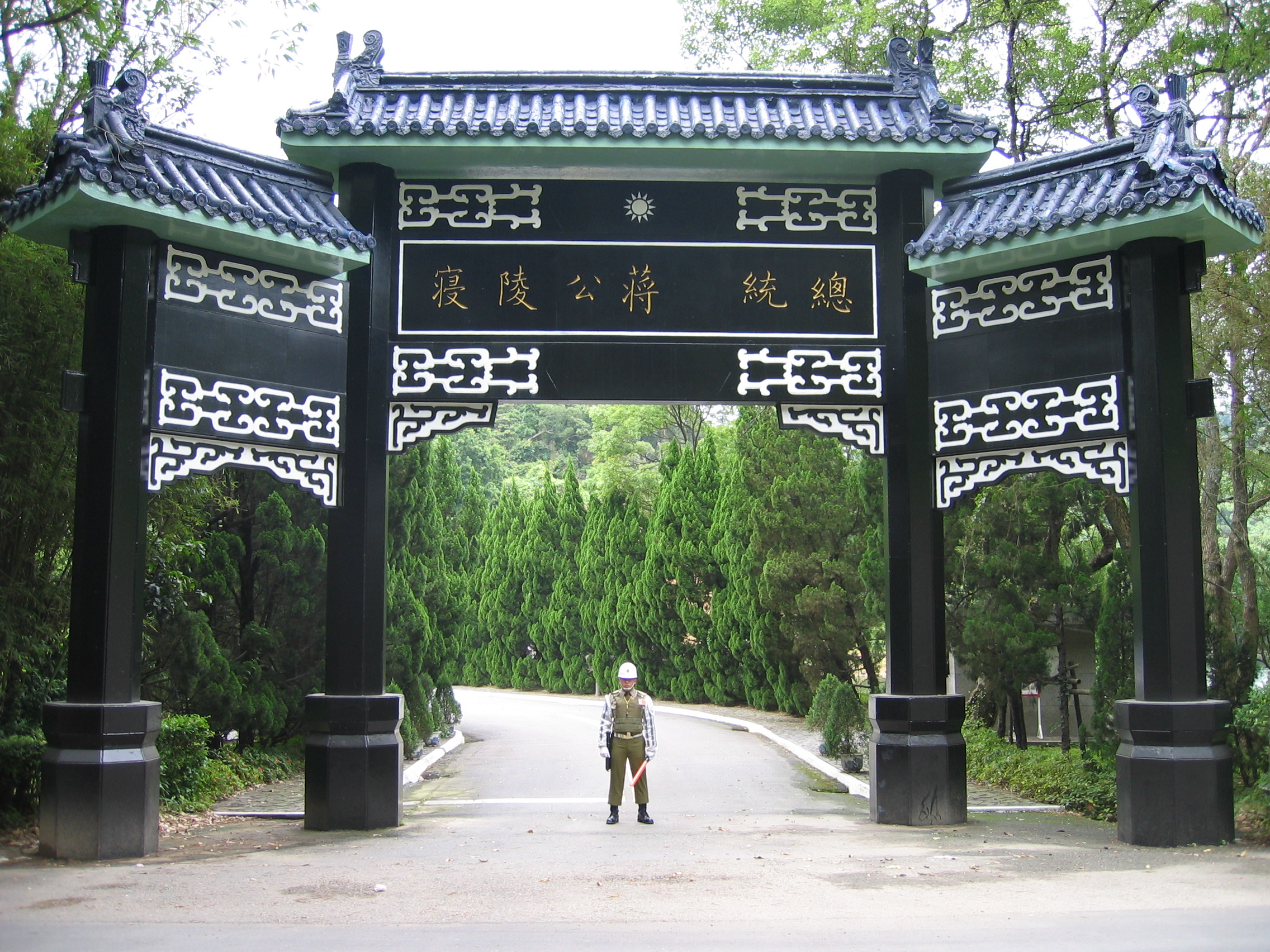
- An ROC military policeman guards the Cihu entrance paifang.
- Interactive map of Cihu Mausoleum 慈湖陵寢
- Location: Daxi, Taoyuan City, Taiwan

History
- Built: 1975
- Built for: President Chiang Kai-shek

Site notes
- Architect: Yang Cho-cheng

Cihu Mausoleum (Chinese: 慈湖陵寢; pinyin: Cíhú Língqǐn), officially known as the Mausoleum of Late President Chiang (Chinese: 先總統 蔣公陵寢; pinyin: Xiān Zǒngtǒng Jiǎnggōng Língqǐn) or President Chiang Kai-shek Mausoleum, is the temporary resting place of President Chiang Kai-shek. It is located in Daxi District, Taoyuan City, Taiwan. When Chiang Kai-shek died in 1975, he was not buried in the traditional Chinese fashion but entombed in a black marble sarcophagus, since he expressed the wish to be eventually buried in his native Fenghua in Zhejiang province once the Kuomintang (KMT) recovered mainland China from the Communists.

== Lake and residence ==
Cihu (慈湖) literally means "benevolence lake", and it refers to the eight acres (32,000 m^{2}) lake located near the tomb-site. The lake is divided into two smaller lakes, 5 and 3 acres (20,000 and 12,000 m^{2}) each with a canal connecting them together. It was formerly called "Green Water Lake" (Chinese: 碧水湖澤; pinyin: Bìshuǐ Húzé) until Chiang Kai-shek renamed it as "Cihu" in 1962 because the scenery reminded him of his benevolent mother and his home town, Fenghua. Chiang loved the lake so much that he had an official residence built nearby to architecturally resemble the houses in Fenghua. He also named his favorite residence Cihu, which was converted to his mausoleum upon his death in 1975. Chiang's body lies in the main hall of the residence. The residence was designed by architect Yang Cho-cheng.

The Cihu lake is part of the "Taoyuan Tableland and Ponds" potential heritage site identified by the Taiwan Bureau of Cultural Heritage.

== Tomb ==
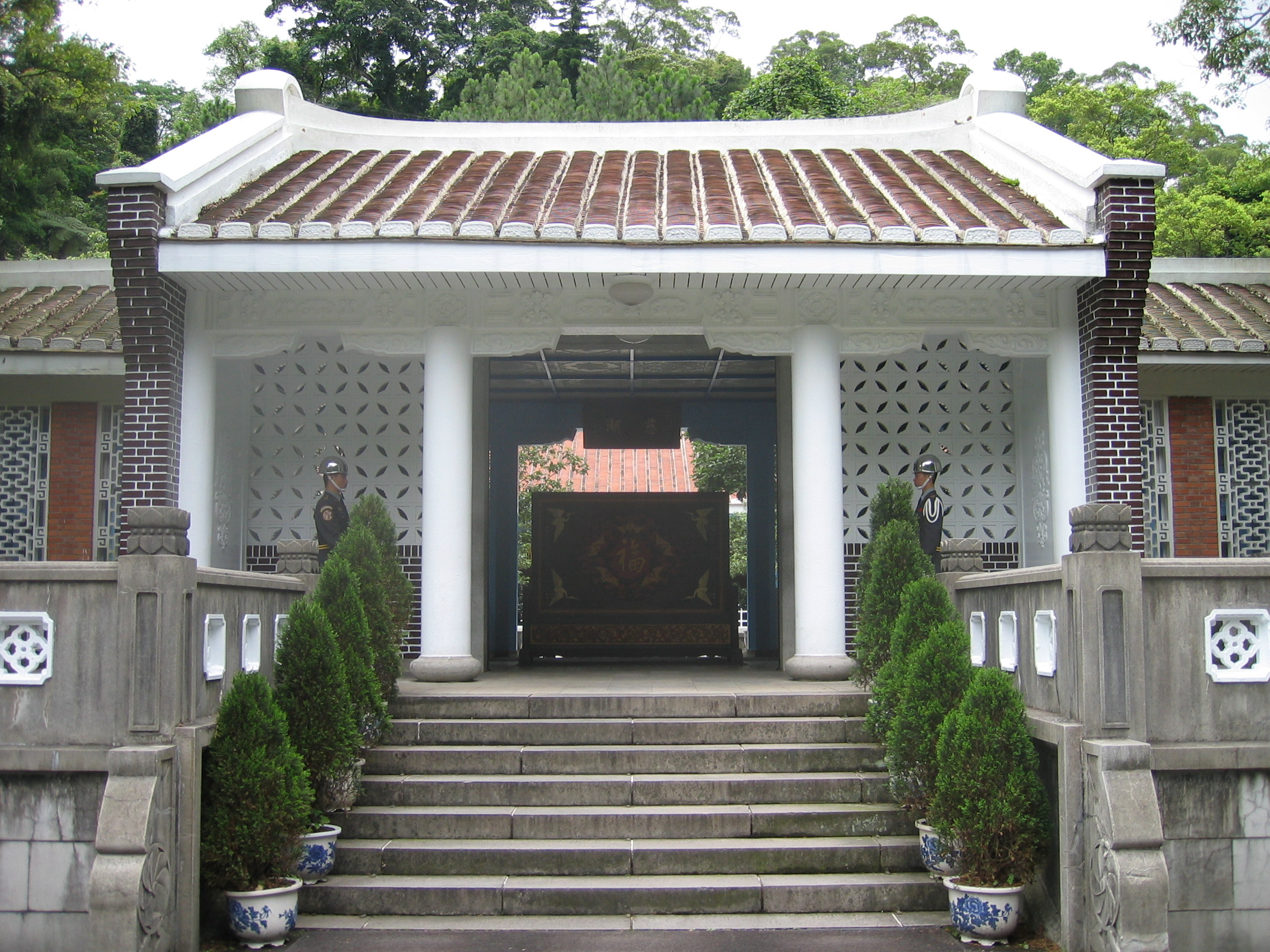
The entrance to the former Chiang residence is flanked by guards from the ROC Army.

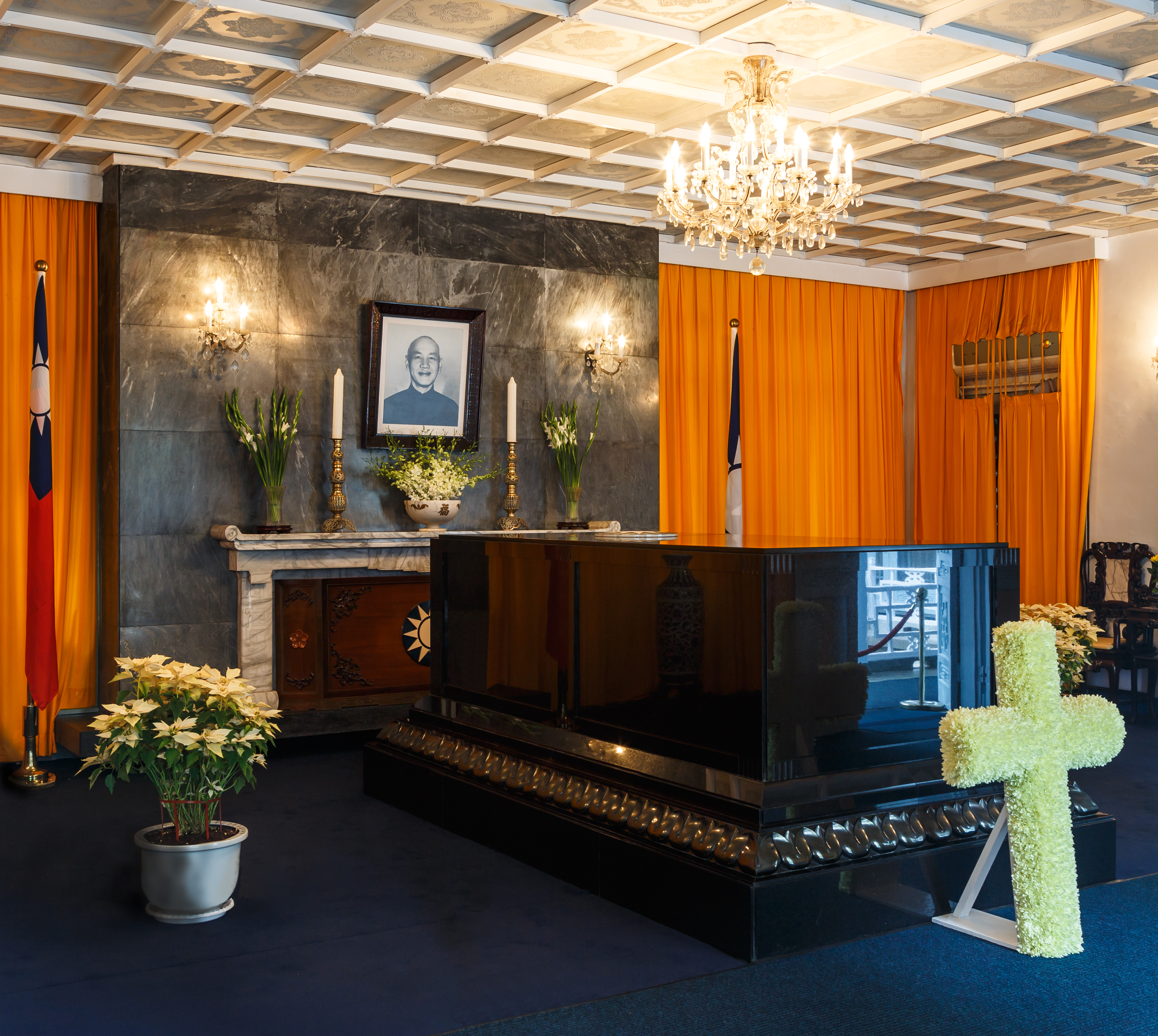
President Chiang Kai-shek's remains lie in a black marble sarcophagus in his former residence.

The Presidential Burial Place was formerly under the jurisdiction of the Republic of China Ministry of National Defense and guarded by the Republic of China Military Police. Management of the grounds was transferred to the Taoyuan County government in 2007, and the military police were removed. Two ceremonial guards from the armed forces stand at attention at the entrance to the former Chiang residence. It is customary to give a respectful bow. Visitors are not allowed to take photographs inside the mausoleum, a prohibition that doesn't apply to the outside.

Cihu is perennially open daily for visits from 8am to 4pm, though it was closed from December 2007 to May 2008 during the waning months of Chen Shui-bian's administration. Interest in the Burial Place was actually revived during these two years as it became embroiled in the then ruling Democratic Progressive Party's campaign to remove public vestiges of the man many see as a brutal dictator. At the same time, Chiang Kai-shek statues from around Taiwan were relocated to the hillside park near the mausoleum.

Prior to the late 1990s, visitors would line up hours for the chance to pay their respects to Chiang Kai-shek (either by bowing three times or saluting before the sarcophagus). Schoolchildren were often bussed in to do the same. At the anniversary of his death on April 5, high-ranking Kuomintang officials would pay homage to the late President in lavish ceremonies. Since democratization of Taiwan during the 1990s the visitors to Cihu have dwindled in their numbers, and the next generation of KMT officials have visited with less pomp and ceremony. Supporters of Taiwan independence (and pro-independence leaders such as Chen Shui-bian) do not visit the site due to their dislike for Chiang Kai-shek—a leader whom they viewed as one who imposed authoritarian rule on Taiwan.

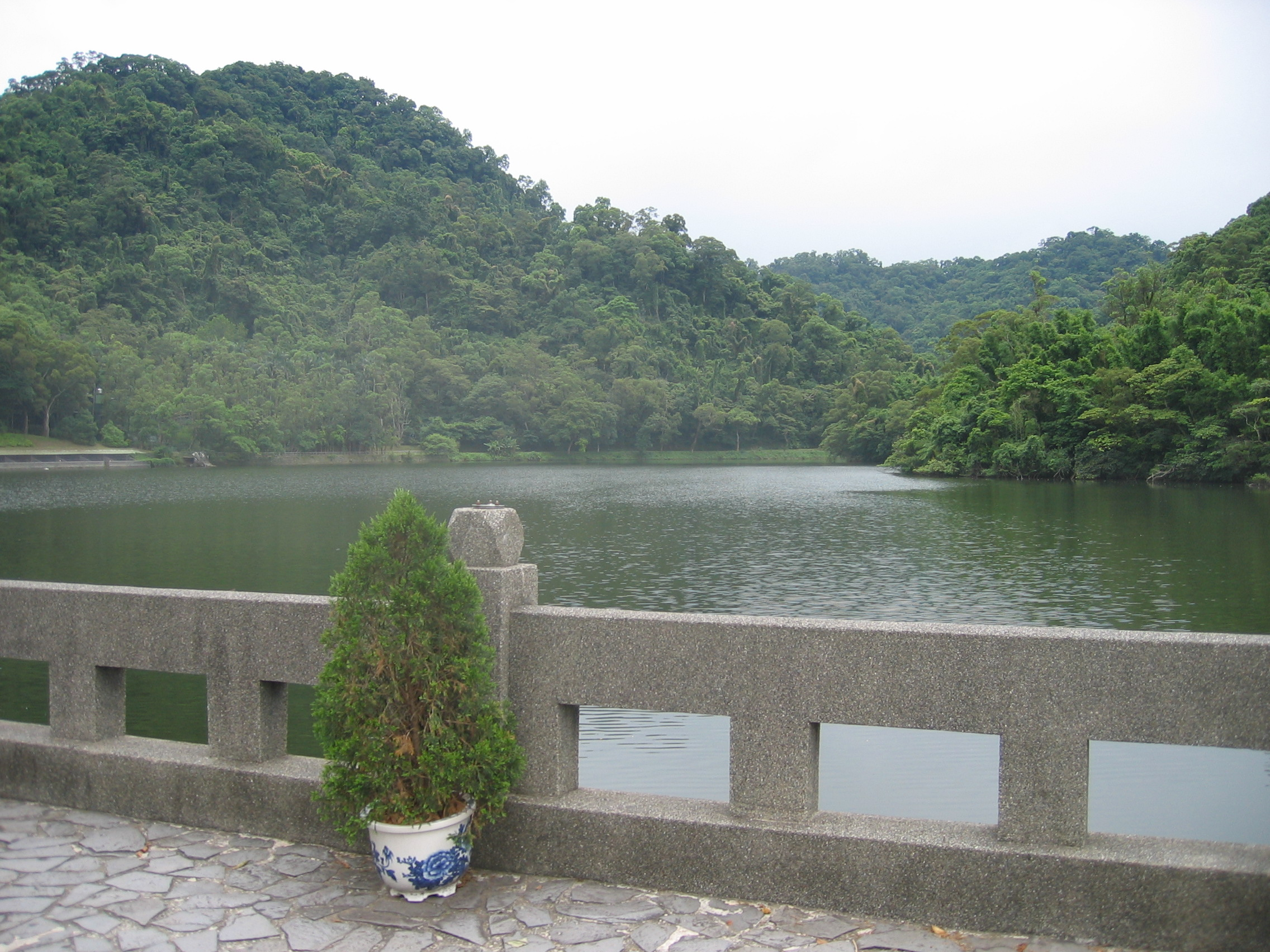
The Cihu lake remains well preserved.

When Chiang Kai-shek's son, President Chiang Ching-kuo, died in 1988 he was also entombed in a similar fashion in nearby Touliao Mausoleum, Daxi. This gained Daxi the reputation as the "township of the Presidents". In 2004, Chiang Fang-liang, the widow of Chiang Ching-kuo, asked that both father and son be buried at Wuchih Mountain Military Cemetery in Hsichih, Taipei County. The state funeral ceremony was planned for late 2006, but due to repeated delays, no ceremony was ever held or materialized. There was public debate if another national funeral should be held again for the burial in Wuchih Mountain Military Cemetery, with fervent supporters of Taiwan independence against granting honors to someone whom they view as a dictator. However, President Chen was inclined to hold another national funeral (the first to invoke the state funeral law) but limited it to one day. Chiang Fang-liang and Soong Mei-ling had agreed in 1997 that the former leaders be first buried but still be moved to mainland China in the event of reunification. Soong Mei-ling died in 2003 and was entombed at Ferncliff Cemetery in New York. Chiang Fang-liang died in 2004 and her cremated remains were placed next to her husband's tomb at Touliao.

With the election of Kuomintang candidate Ma Ying-jeou in the 2008 Republic of China presidential election, Taoyuan County officials hoped the mausoleum would be reopened and planned to give the public a glimpse of a previously restricted section of the park. The residence was converted into his temporary resting site after his death on 5 April 1975 and opened to visitors. But the mysterious grounds behind the mausoleum remained under the control of the Ministry of National Defense, making it impossible for the public to appreciate the beauty of the location or Chiang's security precautions. The trail into the lush woodlands of the restricted area is punctuated with blockhouses, stone-walled sentry posts and bomb shelters, reflecting the tensions between Chiang's government and its Chinese communist rival and his concern for his own safety. It has recently been revealed that the site was involved in the top secret plan to retake mainland China called Project National Glory (國光計劃). In April 1964, Chiang ordered the construction of air-raid shelters and five military offices at Cihu, which served as a secret command center for Project National Glory.

The tomb was vandalized by pro-independence activists on 28 February 2018, the 71st anniversary of the 228 incident, and the activists were later arrested. Because of the vandalism, the tomb is now separated by a glass panel for visitors to view the sarcophagus from the outside, therefore the room is no longer accessible to the general public.

== Gallery ==
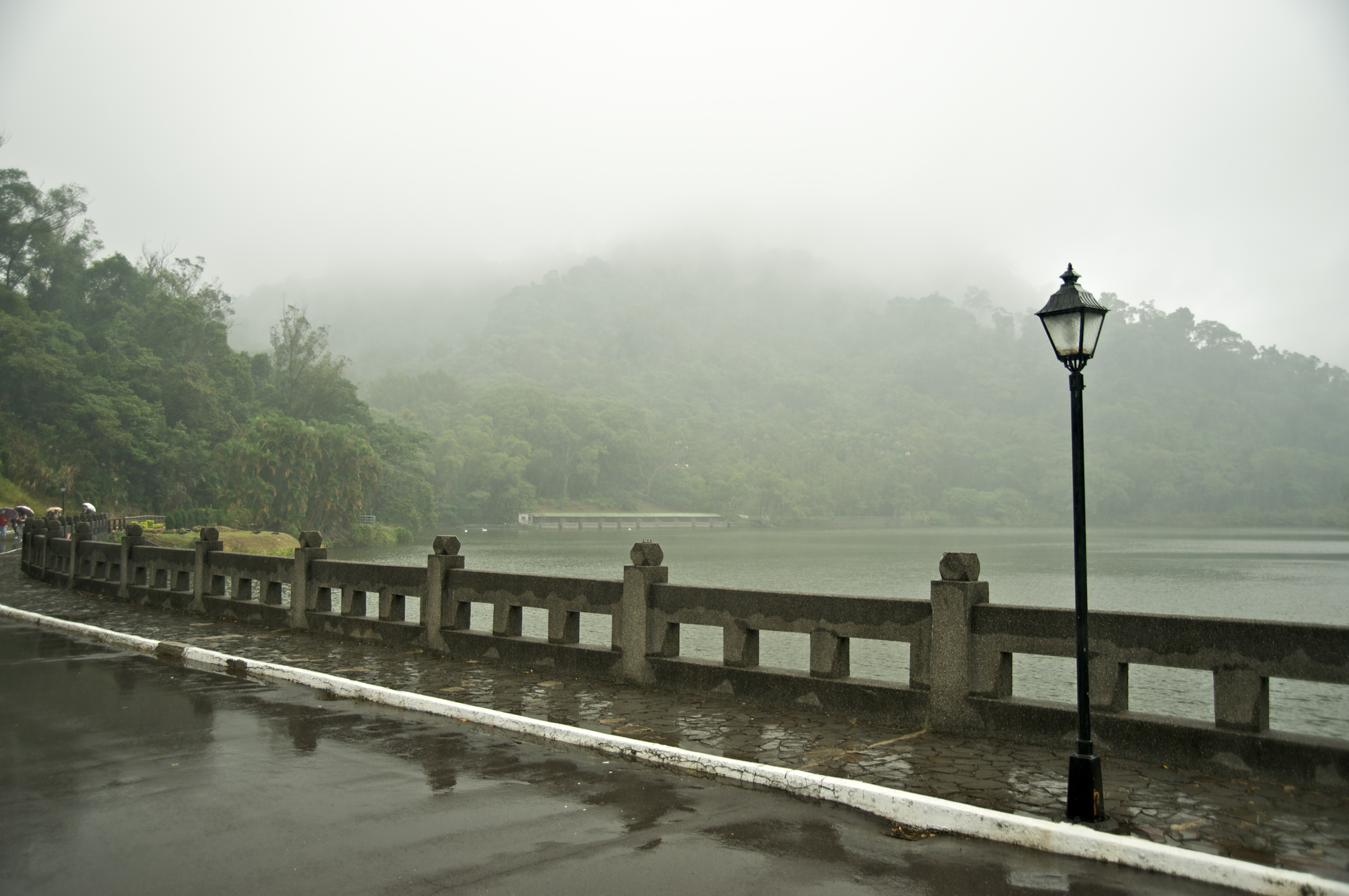

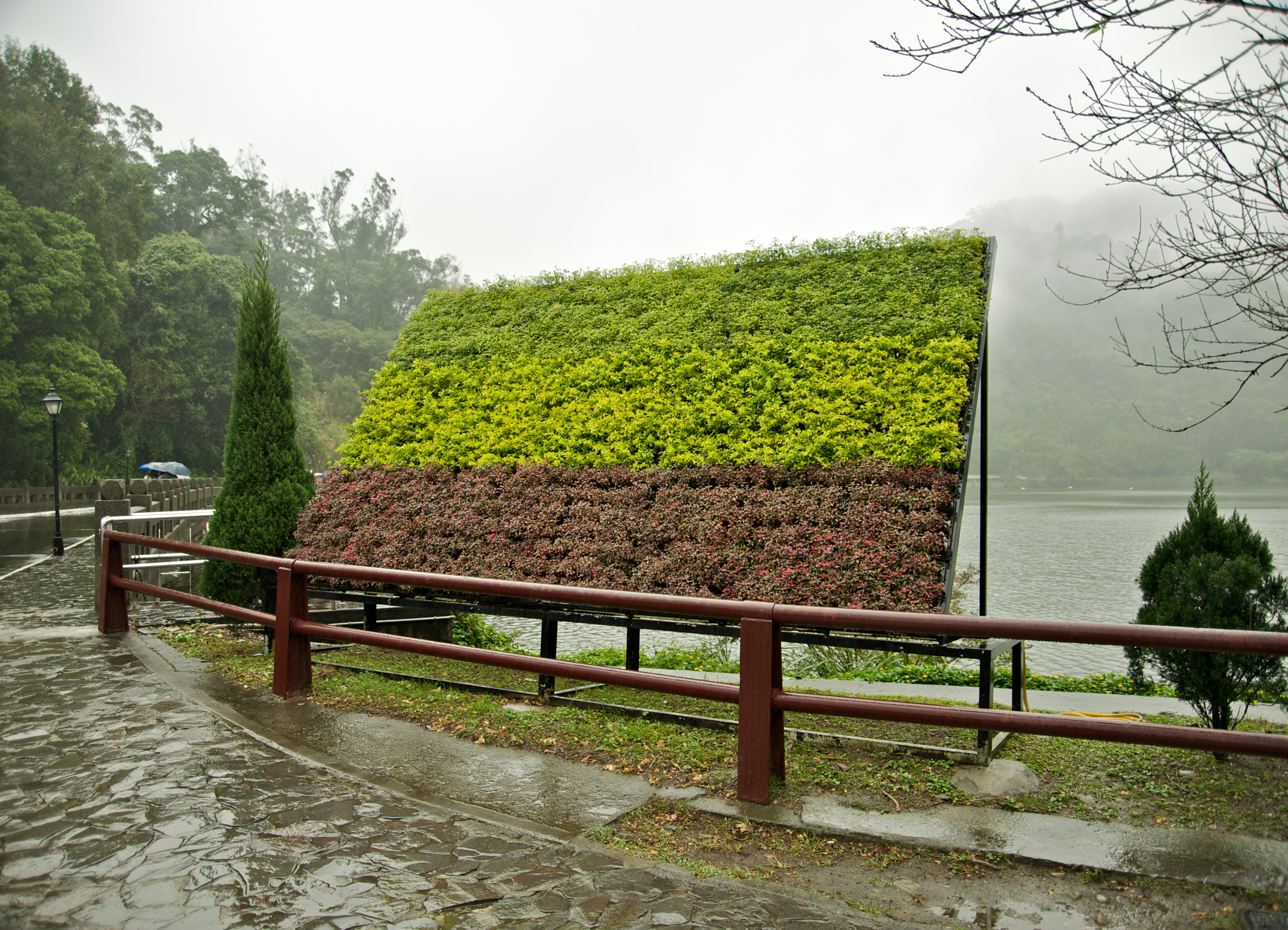

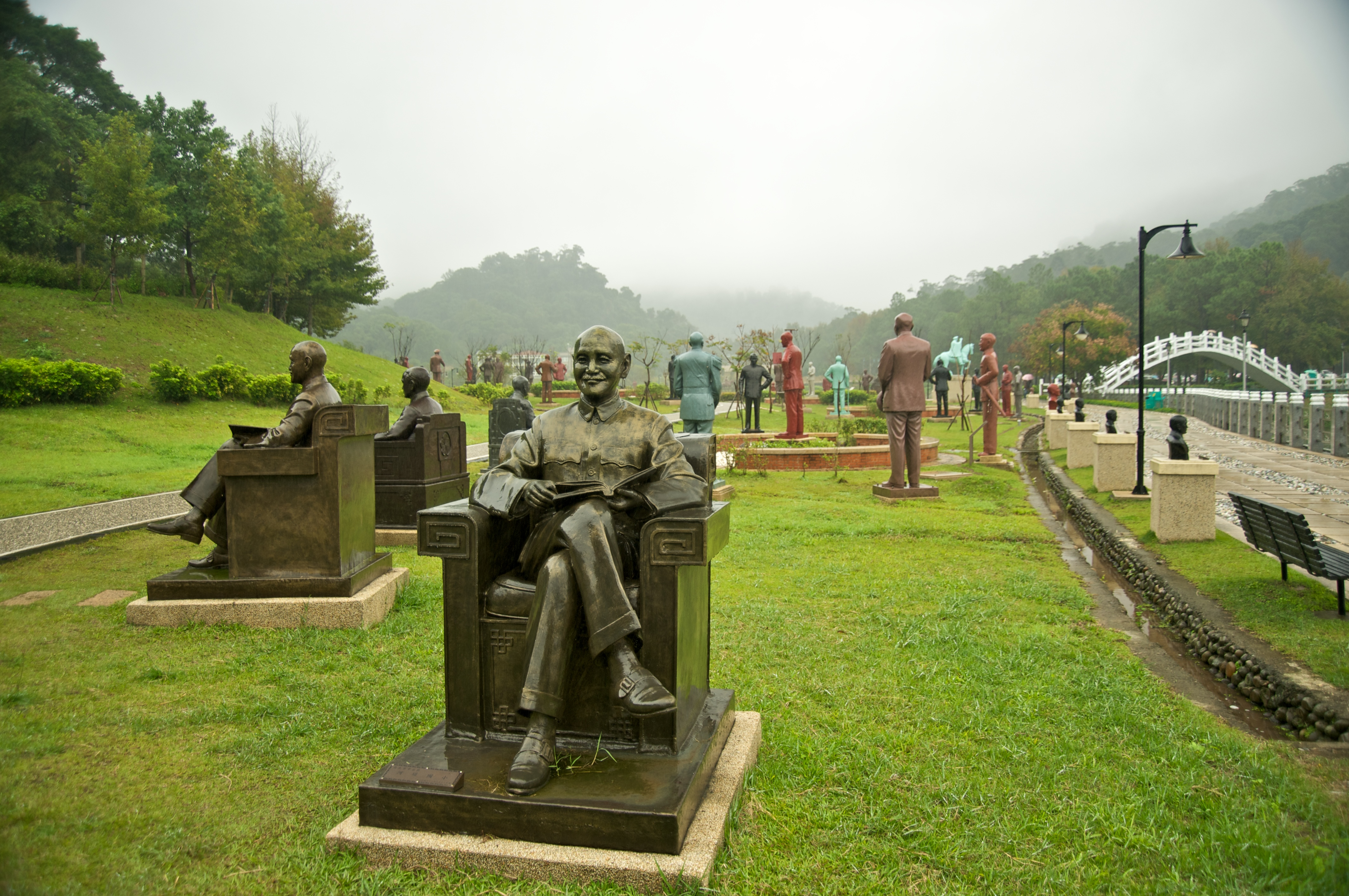

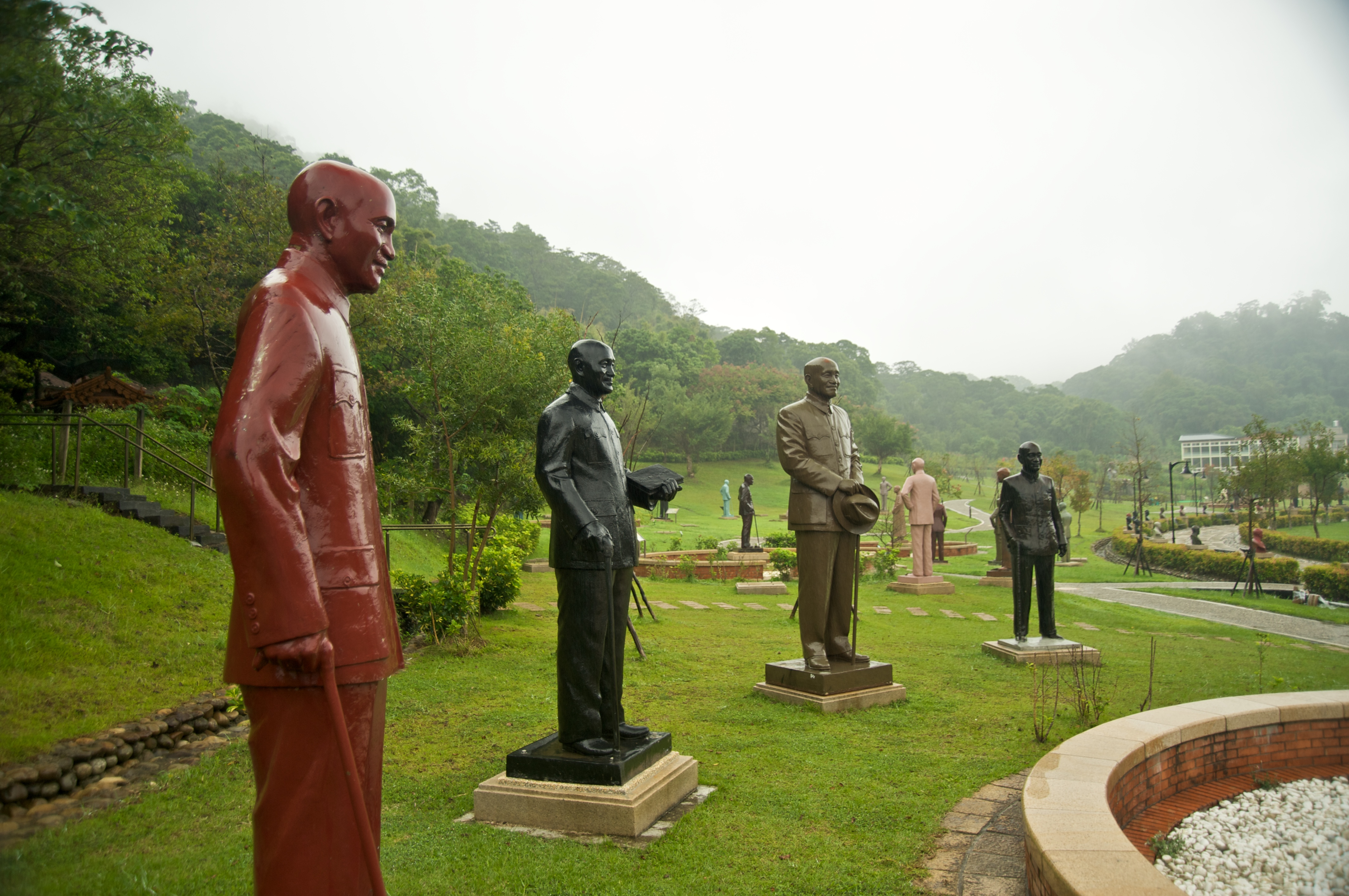

== See also ==
- Sun Yat-sen Mausoleum
- Touliao Mausoleum
- Shilin Official Residence
- Guesthouses of Chiang Kai-shek
- National Chiang Kai-shek Memorial Hall
- Chiang Kai-shek statues
- Wuzhi Mountain Military Cemetery
- Chen Tsyr-shiou Memorial Park (Former Tomb and Memorial Museum of Chen Cheng, demolished in 1995)
- Mausoleum of Mao Zedong
