= Ding Delong =

- 丁德隆
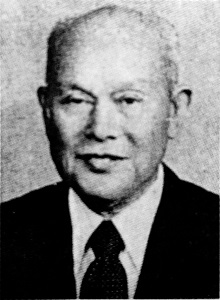
- Ding Delong
- Born: May 24, 1904; You County, Hunan Province, China
- Died: February 24, 1996 (aged 91); Taipei, Taiwan
- Military career
- Allegiance: Republic of China
- Branch: (Republic of China (1912–1949)) National Revolutionary Army
- Service years: 1931–1949
- Rank: Lieutenant general
- Commands: Senior Military Adviser

Ding Delong (Chinese: 丁德隆; 24 May 1904 – 24 February 1996) was a Chinese National Revolutionary Army general from Hunan.

== Biography ==
Ding Delong was born in 1904 in You County, Hunan Province, China. At the age of 20, he enrolled in a military academy, later in the same year, in November 1924, the school became one of the institutions that merged to become the Whampoa Military Academy. He was named the commanding officer of the 6th Regiment of the 1st Division of the Nationalist Chinese 1st Army. In 1931, he was named the commanding officer of the Independent Brigade in the 1st Division. In 1936, he was named the commanding officer of the 78th Division after the 1st Division was expanded to become the 1st Corps, in which role he participated in battles against local warlords and in actions against Chinese communists.

Ding remained with the 1st Corps as the war began in 1937, seeing action in Shanghai, Henan Province, and Wuhan. In 1940, he graduated from the war college at the head of his class and was personally named the commanding officer of the 1st Corps by Chiang Kai-shek. In 1942, he was given command of the 57th Corps, and later in the year, given the concurrent duty as the deputy commanding officer of the 38th Army. In 1944, he became the commanding officer of the 37th Army.

In March 1945, he was promoted to the rank of lieutenant general, in which rank he served as a senior military adviser to the government and oversaw units in training in Xi'an, China. In 1949, when the Nationalists lost the civil war to the Chinese communists, he fled to Taiwan with the Nationalist government. After retirement from the military, he became a member of the National Assembly representing Hunan Province and was a committee member for the liberation of China. He died of illness in Taipei, Taiwan, on 24 February 1996 and was buried in the Wuzhi Mountain Military Cemetery.
