= National Quemoy University =

Institution in Jinning, Kinmen, Taiwan

Coordinates: 24°26′56″N 118°19′19″E

- 國立金門大學
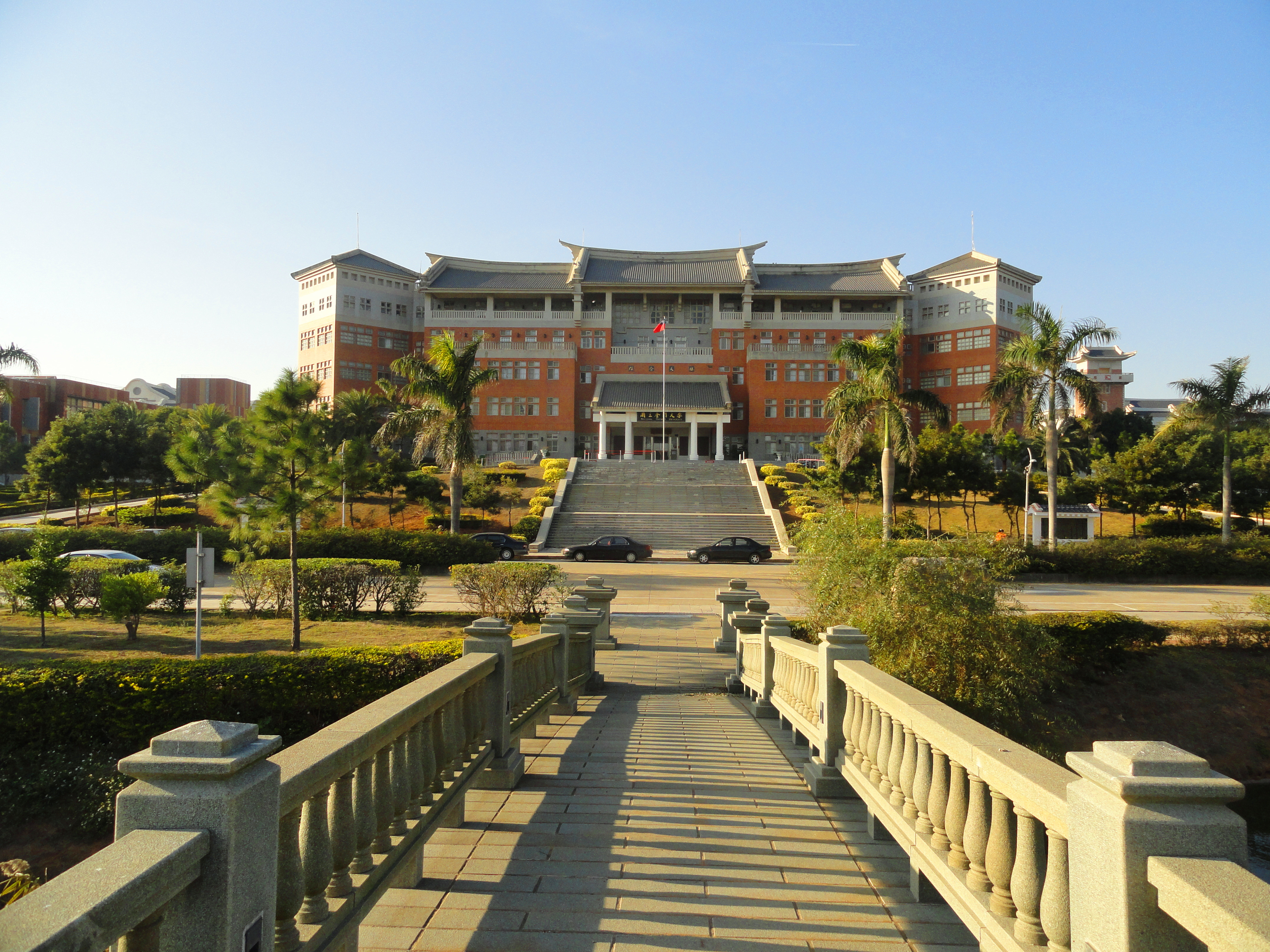
- Former names: National Kinmen Institute of Technology
- Motto: 真知、力行、兼善天下
- Motto in English: Real knowledge, strong performance, for the good of the world
- Type: National
- Established: 1997
- President: James Chen Chien-min (陳建民)
- Academic staff: 150
- Undergraduates: 3,700
- Postgraduates: 300
- Location: Jinning, Kinmen, Fujian Province, Republic of China
- Campus: Rural
- Website: www.nqu.edu.tw/eng/index.php (in English)

National Quemoy University
- Traditional Chinese: 國立金門大學
Transcriptions
Standard Mandarin
- Hanyu Pinyin: Guólì Jīnmén Dàxué
- Wade–Giles: Kuo²-li⁴ Chin¹-men² Ta⁴-hsüeh²
Southern Min
- Hokkien POJ: Kok-li̍p Kim-mn̂g Tōa-o̍h

National Quemoy University (NQU, Chinese: 國立金門大學; Pe̍h-ōe-jī: Kok-li̍p Kim-mn̂g Tōa-o̍h) is a national university, located in Jinning Township, Kinmen (Quemoy), Republic of China (Taiwan). NQU offers a variety of academic programs. They are divided into three categories: 1. undergraduate program, 2. graduate program, and 3. continuing education program.

NQU is known for its programs in marine science, engineering, and business, and it has a strong focus on research and innovation.

== History ==
NQU was founded in 1997 in Kinmen as the National Kaohsiung University of Applied Sciences, Kinmen Division. In 2003, it became the National Kinmen Institute of Technology. It was upgraded to National Quemoy University in 2010.

== Departments ==
- Department of Applied Foreign Languages
- Department of Architecture and Historic Preservation
- Department of Business Administration
- Department of Computer Science and Information Engineering
- Department of Construction Engineering
- Department of Electronic Engineering
- Department of Food Science
- Department of International Affairs
- Department of Sports and Leisure
- Department of Tourism Management
- Graduate Institute of Culture and History of South Fujian
- Graduate Institute of Disaster Prevention and Sustainability
- Graduate Institute of Electrical Engineering and Computer Science
- Graduate Institute of Island Recreation Resources Development
- Graduate Institute of Mainland China Studies
- Graduate Institute of Marine Affairs

== See also ==
- List of universities in Taiwan
