= Houhu Seashore Park =

Park in Jinning, Kinmen, Taiwan

- 后湖滨海公园
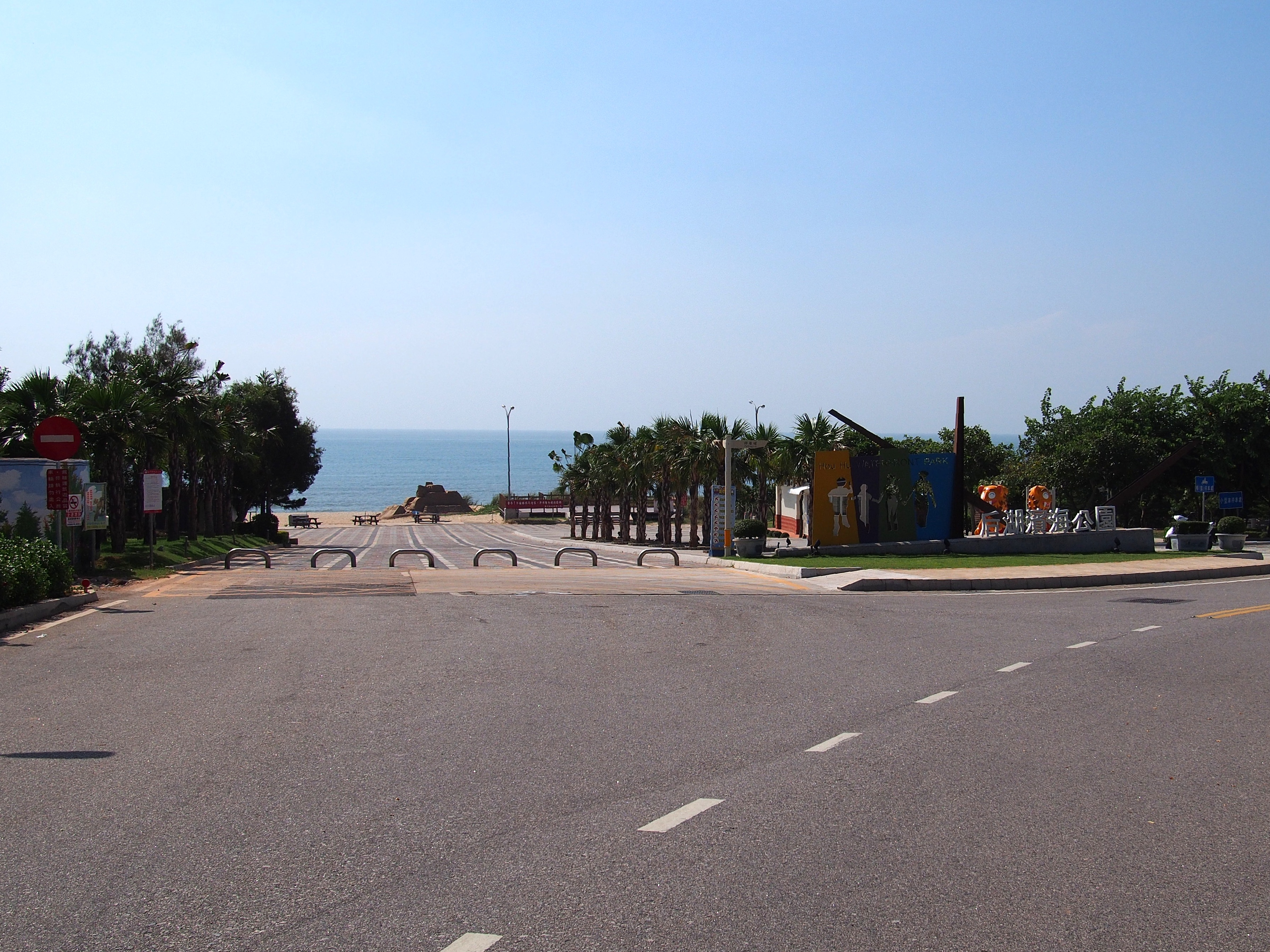
- Interactive map of Houhu Seashore Park
- Type: park
- Location: Jinning, Kinmen, Taiwan
- Coordinates: 24°24′57.5″N 118°20′45.8″E

The Houhu Seashore Park (traditional Chinese: 後湖濱海公園; simplified Chinese: 后湖滨海公园; pinyin: Hòuhú Bīnhǎi Gōngyuán) is a park in Jinning Township, Kinmen County, Taiwan.

== History ==
Due to the long presence of the Republic of China Armed Forces along the shoreline, the beach remains relatively clean all these times. Recently, more facilities have been constructed within the area.

== Activities ==
The beach is the venue for the once-in-12-years Houhu Sea Chau ancient ritual for the deceased fishermen. The ritual is registered as the intangible cultural assets of the county.

== See also ==
- List of parks in Taiwan
