= Wuzhi Mountain Military Cemetery =

Military cemetery in Xizhi, New Taipei, Taiwan

- 五指山國軍示範公墓
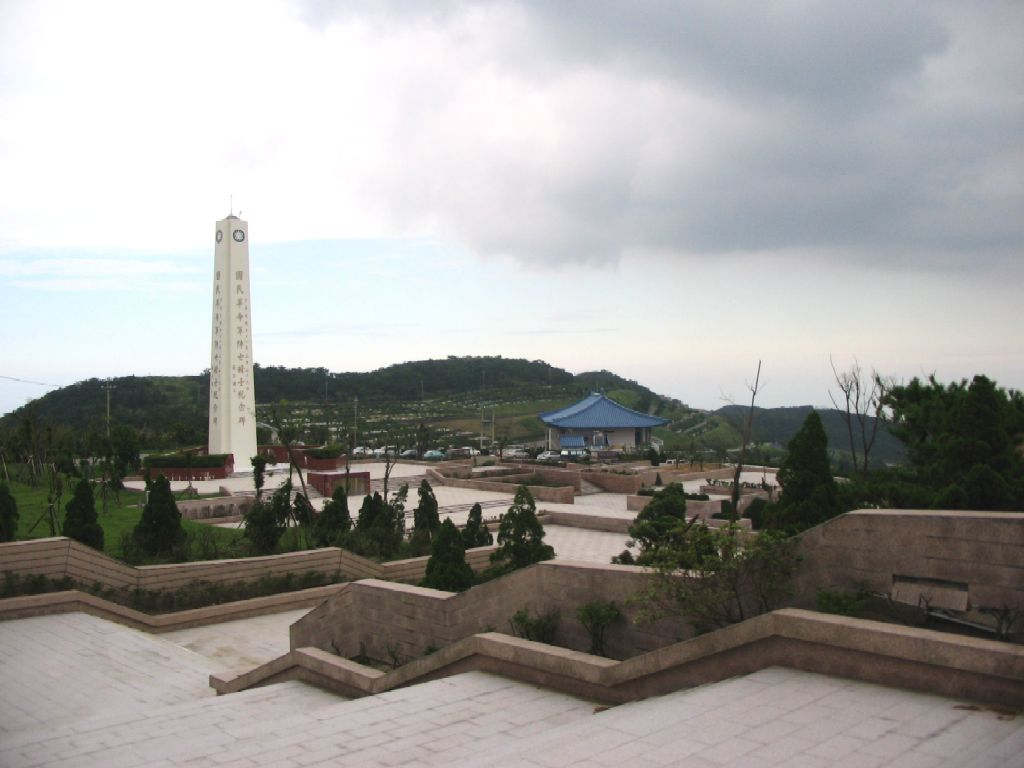
- Interactive map of Wuzhi Mountain Military Cemetery

Details
- Established: 1982
- Location: Xizhi, New Taipei, Taiwan
- Coordinates: 25°8′2.75″N 121°37′0.27″E
- Type: Military cemetery
- Owned by: Reserve Command; Republic of China Armed Forces
- Size: 225.7 ha (78 ha useable)
- No. of graves: 9,236
- Website: afrc.mnd.mil.tw/cemetery/default.aspx
- Find a Grave: Wuzhi Mountain Military Cemetery

The Wuzhi Mountain Military Cemetery (Chinese: 五指山國軍示範公墓; pinyin: Wǔzhǐ Shān Guójūn Shìfàn Gōngmù, sometimes romanized as Wuchih) is Taiwan's most prominent military cemetery. The cemetery is located on Wuzhi Mountain (五指山) at an elevation of 699 metres (2,293 ft) in Xizhi, New Taipei City and borders Taipei City's Neihu District and Yangmingshan National Park. The cemetery has a wide open view ranging from the Taipei 101 over at Taipei's Xinyi District to the Keelung Harbor.

== History ==
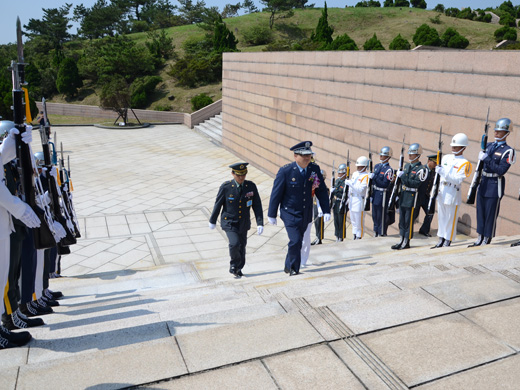
Honor Guards lined up at the Wuzhi Mountain Military Cemetery, 3 September 2014

General Chiang Wei-kuo, the adopted son of Chiang Kai-shek, conceived and designed the cemetery. Prior to the construction of the cemetery, the land was used as a golf course. Planning for the cemetery started in April 1980, with construction starting on March 20, 1981; the cemetery opened on March 29, 1982.

A four-story columbarium named the Memorial Palace (忠靈殿) was opened on January 20, 2002 after two years of construction. It has a total capacity of 19,537 niches on the four named floors:

1. 吉地廳; Jí De Tīng; 'Auspicious Hall'
2. 乾黃廳; Gān Huáng Tīng; 'Dry Yellow Hall'
3. 九玄廳; Jiǔ Xuán tīng; 'Nine Mysteries Hall'
4. 浩天廳; Hào Tiān tīng; 'Good Heaven Hall'

== Issues ==
=== Capacity ===
Although the cemetery has nearly 226 hectares total area, the terrain and building codes restrict interment to only 78 ha of the land. As of 2004, the cemetery, which has 9,236 grave plots, is nearly full; further deceased military officials will need to be cremated and their ashes stored in the columbarium.

=== Chiang family ===
In 2004, Chiang Fang-liang made a request to inter the bodies of Chiang Kai-shek and his son, Chiang Ching-kuo at Wuzhi. However, the plan did not receive universal support from the Chiang family, and despite the completion of their tombs at Wuzhi, Chiang Kai-shek and his son remain at Cihu and Touliao, respectively.

== Notable interments ==
Most are senior generals who served under KMT from mainland China or dignitaries

- Chiang Wei-kuo, general and adopted son of Chiang Kai-shek
- Huang Baitao
- Gu Zhutong, a senior general who followed Chiang from Shanghai
- He Yingqin, a senior KMT general who was chief staff and chief instructor from Whampoa Military Academy.
- Huang Chieh, general and former Taiwan Governor who brought servicemen from western Hunan Province.
- Liu Yuzhang, general from Tsingtao
- Tang Enbo
- Sun Zhen
- Sun Lianzhong
- Cheng Wei-yuan
- Yen Chia-kan, former President of the Republic of China
- Xue Yue, General from Kwangtung
- Wang Shuming
- Ding Delong, General from Hunan
- Wang Sheng
- Louie Yim-qun
- Chuang Ming-yao
- Nelson Ku
- Chiang Chung-ling
- Chen Hsing-ling
- Hau Pei-tsun, former Premier of the Republic of China
- Lee Teng-hui, former President of the Republic of China
- Tang Yao-ming
- Liu Ho-chien
- Hsu Li-nung

== See also ==
- Cihu Mausoleum
- Touliao Mausoleum
- Arlington National Cemetery
- Babaoshan Revolutionary Cemetery
- Revolutionary Martyrs' Cemetery
- Patriotic Martyrs' Cemetery
- Seoul National Cemetery
