= Kinmen Bridge =

Bridge in Kinmen, Taiwan

Kinmen Bridge 金門大橋
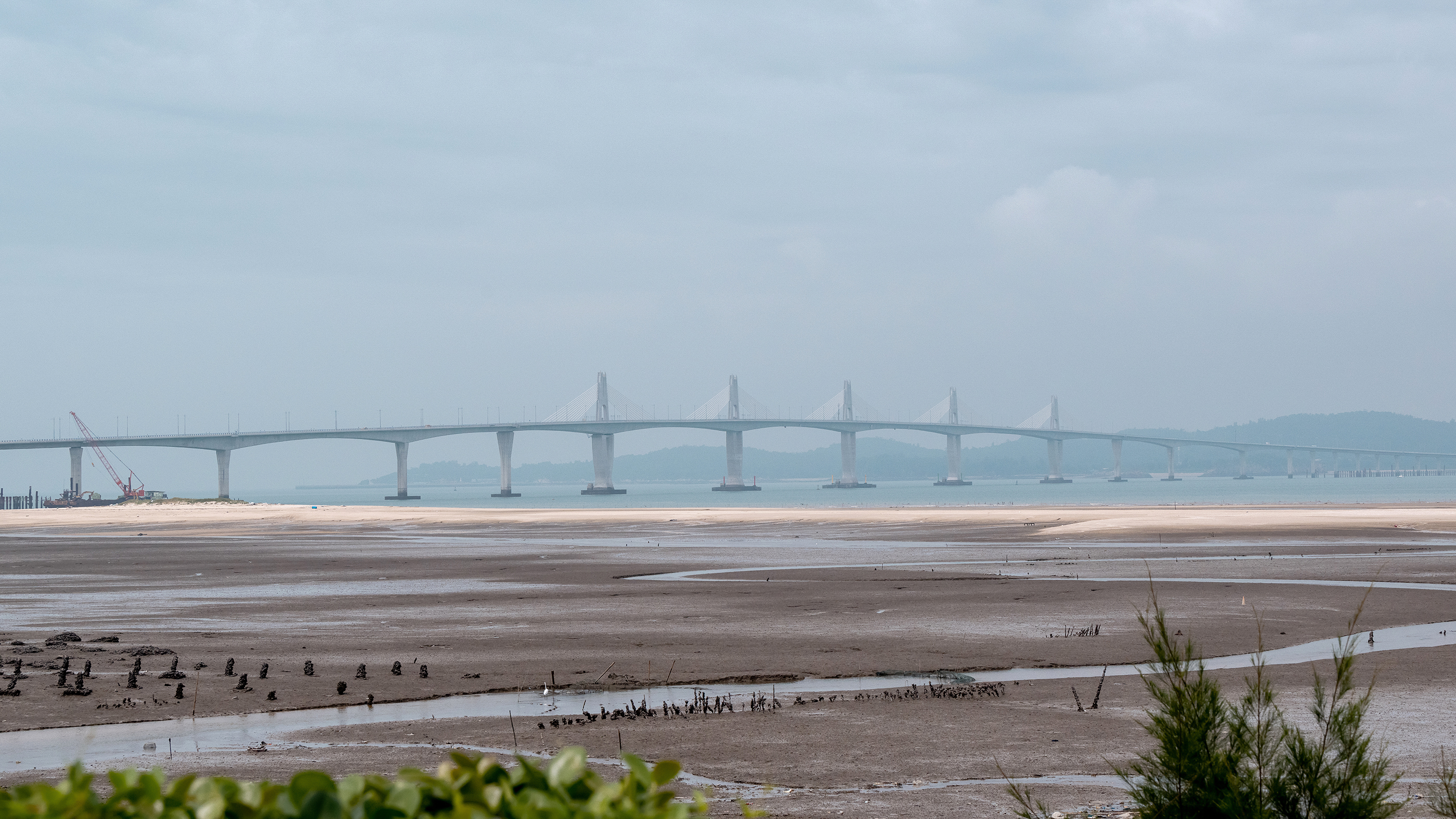
- Coordinates: 24°27′03″N 118°16′59″E
- Locale: Jinning and Lieyu in Kinmen, Fujian, Republic of China

Characteristics
- Design: bridge
- Total length: 5 km
- Width: 15 meters
- Longest span: 200 m
- No. of lanes: 4

History
- Construction start: 2013
- Construction end: 2022
- Construction cost: NT$9 billion
- Opened: October 30, 2022

Location
- Interactive map of Kinmen Bridge

The Kinmen Bridge (traditional Chinese: 金門大橋; simplified Chinese: 金门大桥; pinyin: Jīnmén Dàqiáo) is a cross-sea bridge in Kinmen, Fujian, Republic of China. It connects Greater Kinmen Island and Lieyu Island.

== History ==
On 28 February 2010, this project of constructing the bridge was approved by Council for Economic Planning and Development of the Republic of China. On 9 January 2011, President Ma Ying-jeou traveled to Kinmen to host the groundbreaking ceremony. The bridge construction commenced in 2013. However, on 29 June 2016, the construction work was suspended when the Government of the Republic of China terminated the contract with Kuo Teng Construction Co. (the construction company which had been building the bridge), due to the poor construction management that had caused the project to be seriously behind schedule.

During August 2016, the Taiwan Area National Expressway Engineering Bureau invited new contractor companies to complete the remaining project. The bureau announced the tender winner on 31 August 2016. Work resumed on 28 December 2016 and was at that point expected to be completed by 25 September 2020. However, in February 2017, Public Construction Commission Minister Wu Hong-mo requested the bridge completion date to be moved earlier to the end of 2019.

In August 2019, the last pile of the bridge was installed and was expected to be completed by mid-2021. The Kinmen Bridge was opened to the public on 30 October 2022.

== Architecture ==
The bridge links Jinning Township on Greater Kinmen Island and Lieyu Township on Lieyu Island. It spans over 5.4 kilometres (3.4 mi) in length and is supported by five towers separated 280 metres (920 ft) apart. The bridge surface is 15 metres (49 ft) wide, and consists of two lanes for vehicles, one lane for pedestrians, and one lane for bicycles.

== Budget ==
A total of NT$7.39 billion was originally budgeted for the bridge construction, of which NT$3.96 billion came from the central government and NT$3.43 billion came from Kinmen County Government. After repeated delays, the budget blew out to about NT$9 billion. Performance bond from Kuo Teng Construction Co. was taken to cover the extra cost incurred. However, there is still a shortfall of NT$500 million.

== See also ==
- List of bridges in Taiwan
- Transportation in Taiwan
