= Gulongtou Zhenwei Residence =

Historic house in Jinning, Kinmen, Taiwan

- 古龍頭振威第
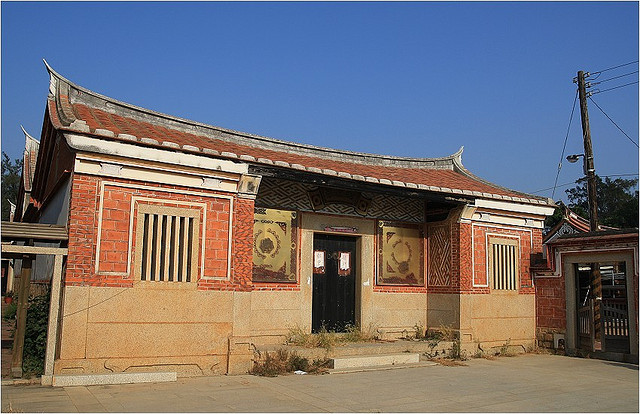
- Interactive map of the Gulongtou Zhenwei Residence area

General information
- Type: former residence
- Location: Jinning, Kinmen, Taiwan
- Coordinates: 24°28′42.3″N 118°18′43.1″E

The Gulongtou Zhenwei Residence (traditional Chinese: 古龍頭振威第; simplified Chinese: 古龙头振威第; pinyin: Gǔlóngtóu Zhènwēi Dì) is a historical building in Jinning Township, Kinmen, Fujian, Republic of China.

== History ==
The residence was built by the brother of Li Guang-hsien, a naval military personnel of the Qing Dynasty.

== See also ==
- List of tourist attractions in Taiwan
