= Beishan Old Western-style House =

Former residence in Jinning, Kinmen, Taiwan

- 北山古洋樓
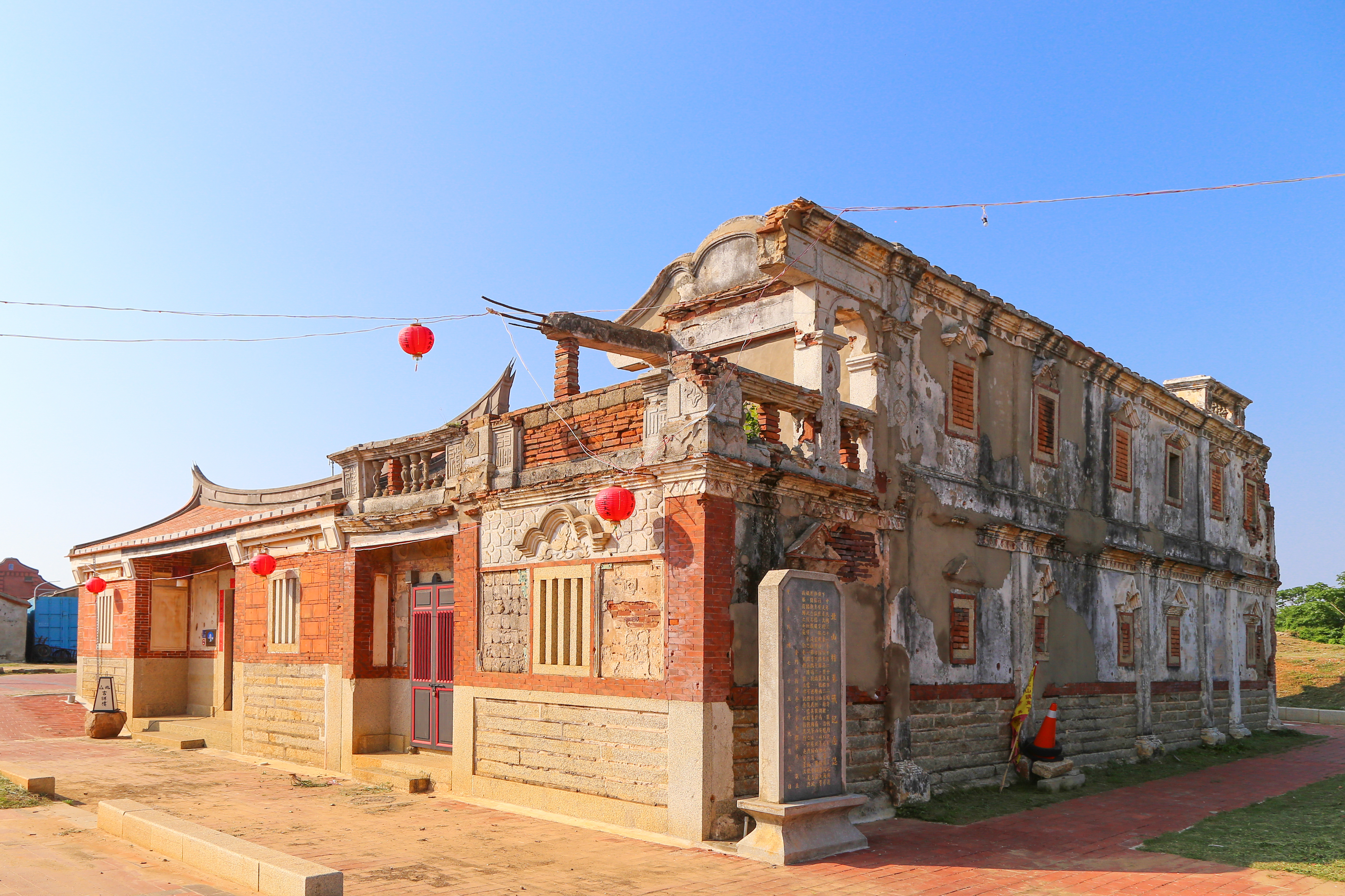
- Interactive map of the Beishan Old Western-style House area

General information
- Type: house
- Location: Jinning, Kinmen, Taiwan
- Coordinates: 24°28′45.18″N 118°18′37.34″E
- Completed: 1928

The Beishan Old Western-style House (traditional Chinese: 北山古洋樓; simplified Chinese: 北山古洋楼; pinyin: Běishān Gǔyánglóu) is a house in Jinning Township, Kinmen County, Taiwan.

== History ==
The house was established in 1928. During the Battle of Guningtou in 1949, the house was occupied by the People's Liberation Army and was turned into a command post.

== Architecture ==
The house was constructed in the Western architectural style. It consists of two courtyards.

== See also ==
- List of tourist attractions in Taiwan
