= Jinning, Kinmen =

Coordinates: 24.456720°N 118.334506°E

Jinning Township 金寧鄉 Kinning, Chinning, Chin-ning
- Rural township
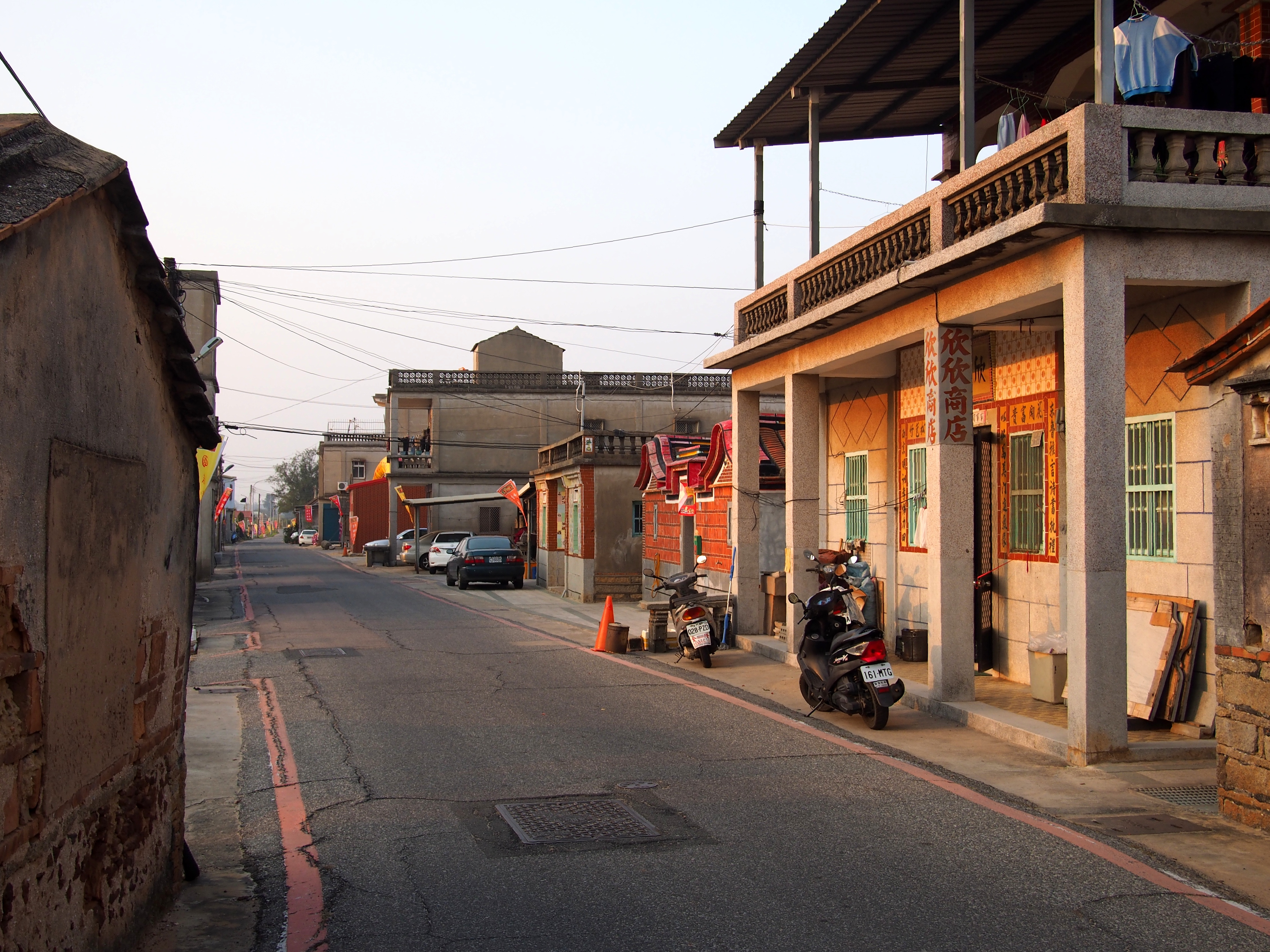

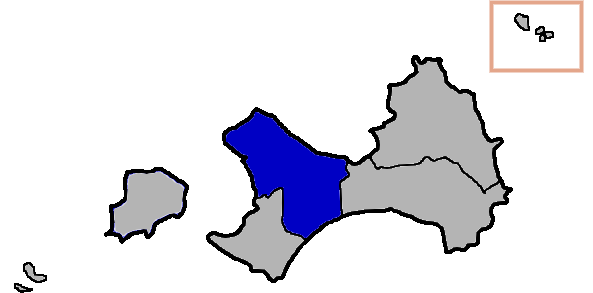
- Jinning Township (blue) in Kinmen County (grey)
- Country: Republic of China
- Province: Fuchien
- County: Kinmen
- Rural villages: 6

Government
  - Mayor: Yang Chung-Chun (楊忠俊)

Area
  - Total: 29.8540 km^{2} (11.5267 sq mi)

Population (February 2023)
  - Total: 34,569
  - Density: 1,157.9/km^{2} (2,999.0/sq mi)
- Postal code: 892
- Website: jinning.kinmen.gov.tw/en

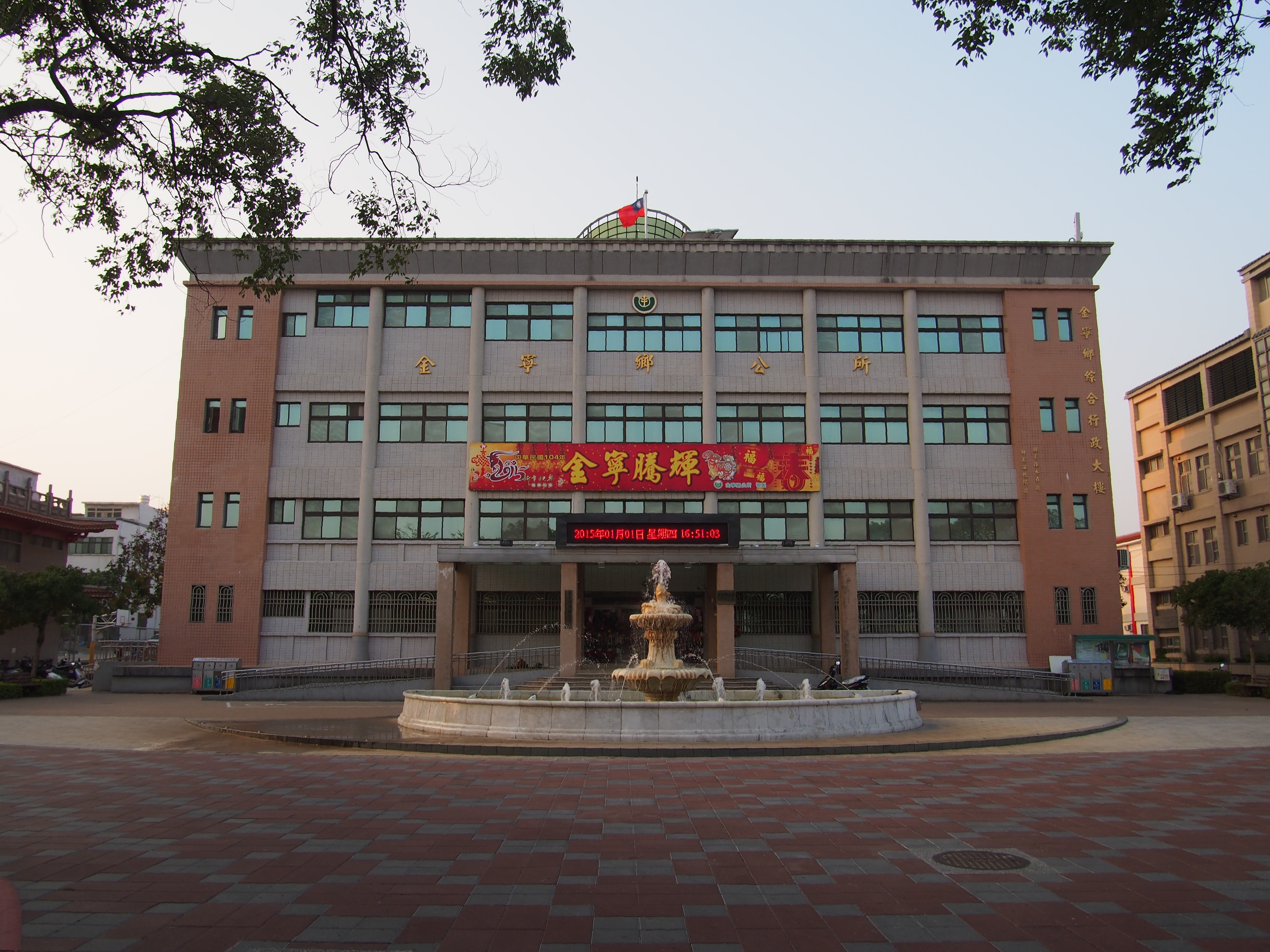
Jinning Township Office

Jinning Township (Chinese: 金寧鄉; pinyin: Jīnníng Xiāng; Wade–Giles: Chin¹-ning² Hsiang¹; Pe̍h-ōe-jī: Kim-lêng-hiong) is a rural township in Kinmen. It is in the Taiwan Strait, on the coast of mainland China. It has a population of 34,569 (February 2023) and an area of 29.8540 km^{2} (11.5267 sq mi).

== History ==
In 1913, Sen-you Li (李森佑) founded the Guning Advanced Elementary School (古寧高等小學).

In October 1949, today's Jinning Township was the site of the Battle of Kuningtou.

Jinning Township was established in 1953.

In 1999, the Kinmen County Government established a horseshoe crab conservation area of about 800 hectares in the tidal flat northwest of Guningtou (Ku-ning-t'ou, 古寧頭).

In August 2026, all shipments and sales of pork to Taiwan Area have been halted after one of the pig caracasses had been found in the shores of Wushajiao that was infected with African swine fever.

== Administrative divisions ==
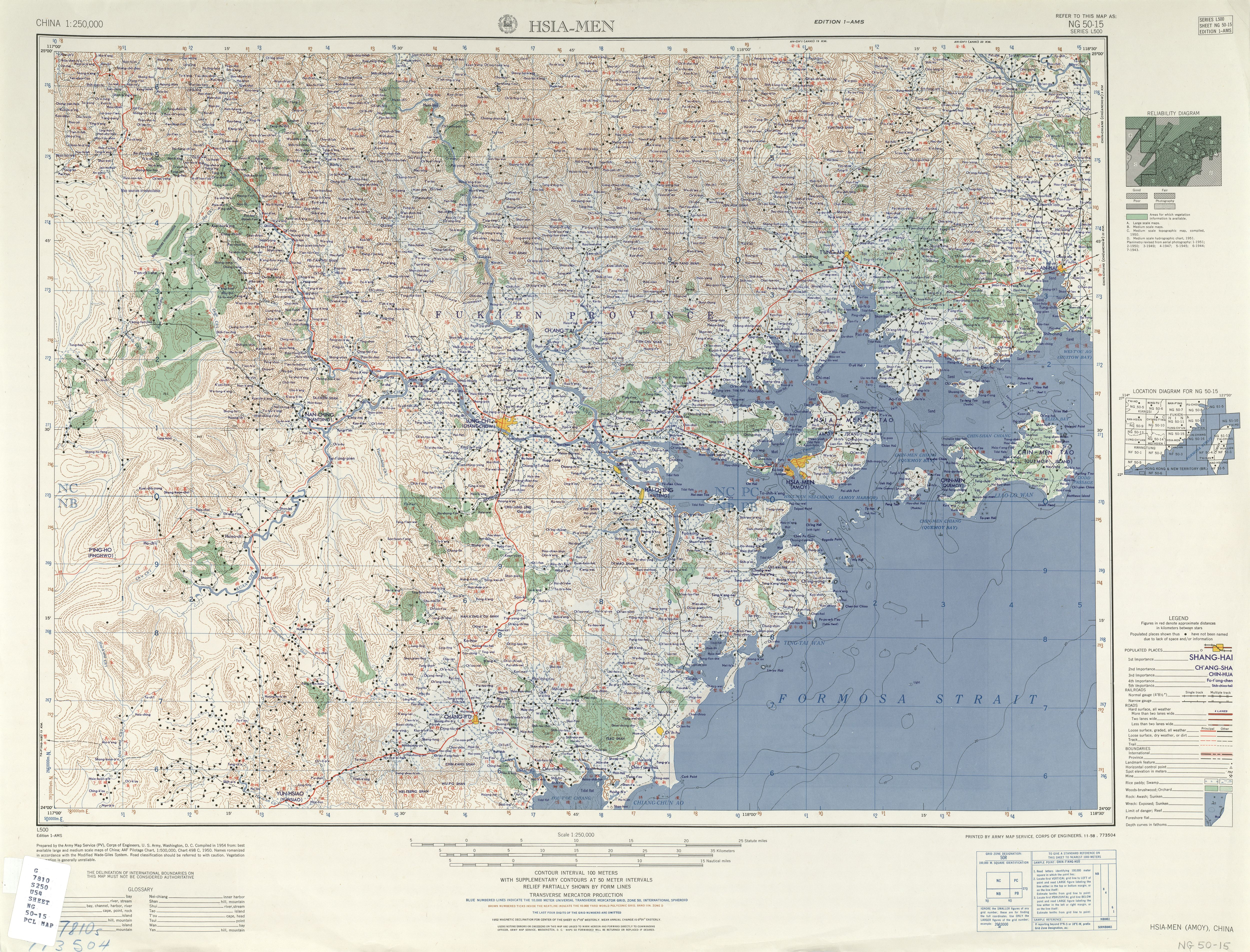
Map including the Jinning Township area (1954)

Jinning is divided into six rural villages:

- Anmei Village (安美村)
- Banglin Village (Pang-lin, 榜林村)
- Guning Village (古寧村)
- Houpan Village (后盤村)
- Hupu Village (湖埔村)
- Panshan Village (盤山村)

== Education ==
- National Quemoy University

== Tourist attractions ==
- Beishan Broadcasting Wall
- Beishan Old Western-style House
- Chiang Ching-kuo Memorial Hall
- Ci Lake
- Gulongtou Zhenwei Residence
- Guningtou Battle Museum
- Houhu Seashore Park
- Kinmen Peace Memorial Park

== Transportation ==
Jinning is connected to Lieyu by the Kinmen Bridge.

== See also ==
- List of islands of Taiwan
