= Guningtou Battle Museum =

Museum in Jinning, Kinmen, Taiwan

- 古寧頭戰史館
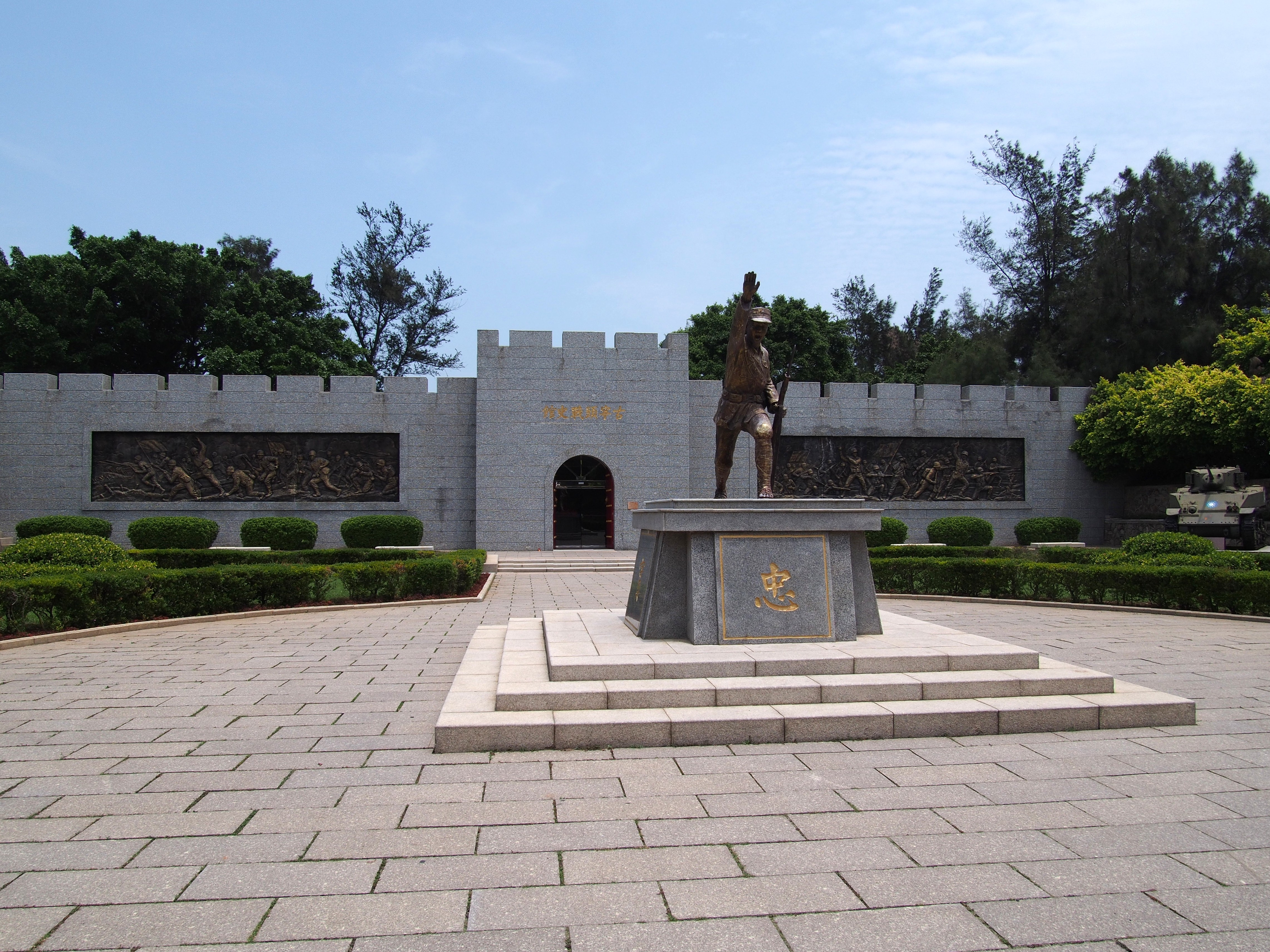
- Established: 1984
- Location: Jinning, Kinmen, Taiwan
- Coordinates: 24°28′58.89″N 118°19′15.88″E
- Type: museum

The Guningtou Battle Museum (traditional Chinese: 古寧頭戰史館; simplified Chinese: 古宁头战史馆; pinyin: Gǔníngtóu Zhànshǐguǎn) is located in the Kuningtou area of the Kinmen National Park, Jinning Township, Kinmen County, Taiwan.

== History ==
The museum was built in 1984 by local military and civilian population to commemorate the Battle of Guningtou (started in 1949 and continued throughout the 1950s) between Republic of China Armed Forces and People's Liberation Army.

== Exhibition ==
On the outside of museum, three bronze statues of soldiers ready for battle are displayed. On both sides are the M5A1 tanks used during the battle. Inside of the museum are the exhibition of military equipment, military weapons, battle-related documents, photos and paintings.

== See also ==
- List of museums in Taiwan
