= Saraighat War Memorial Park =

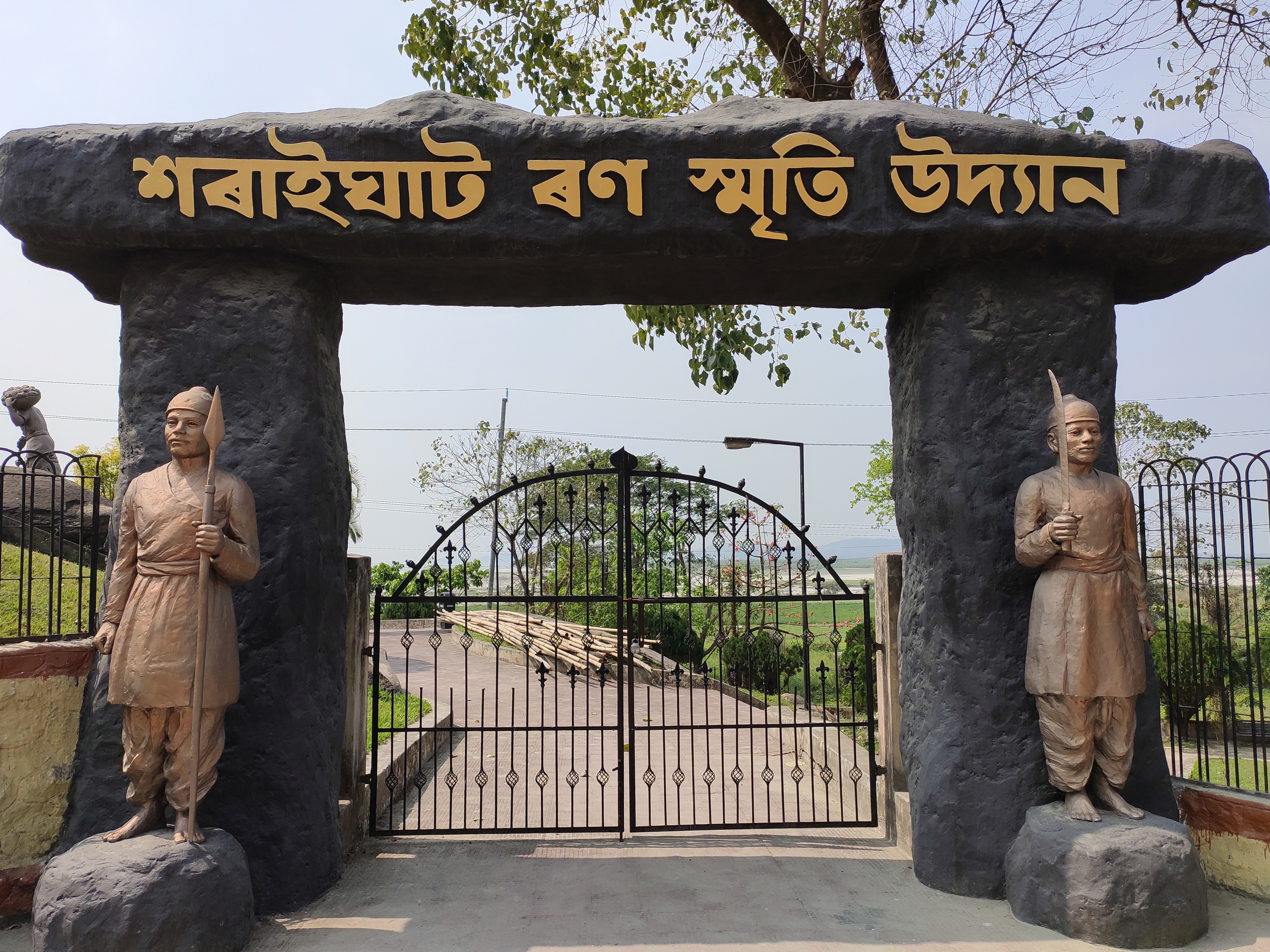
Entrance gate of Saraighat war memorial park

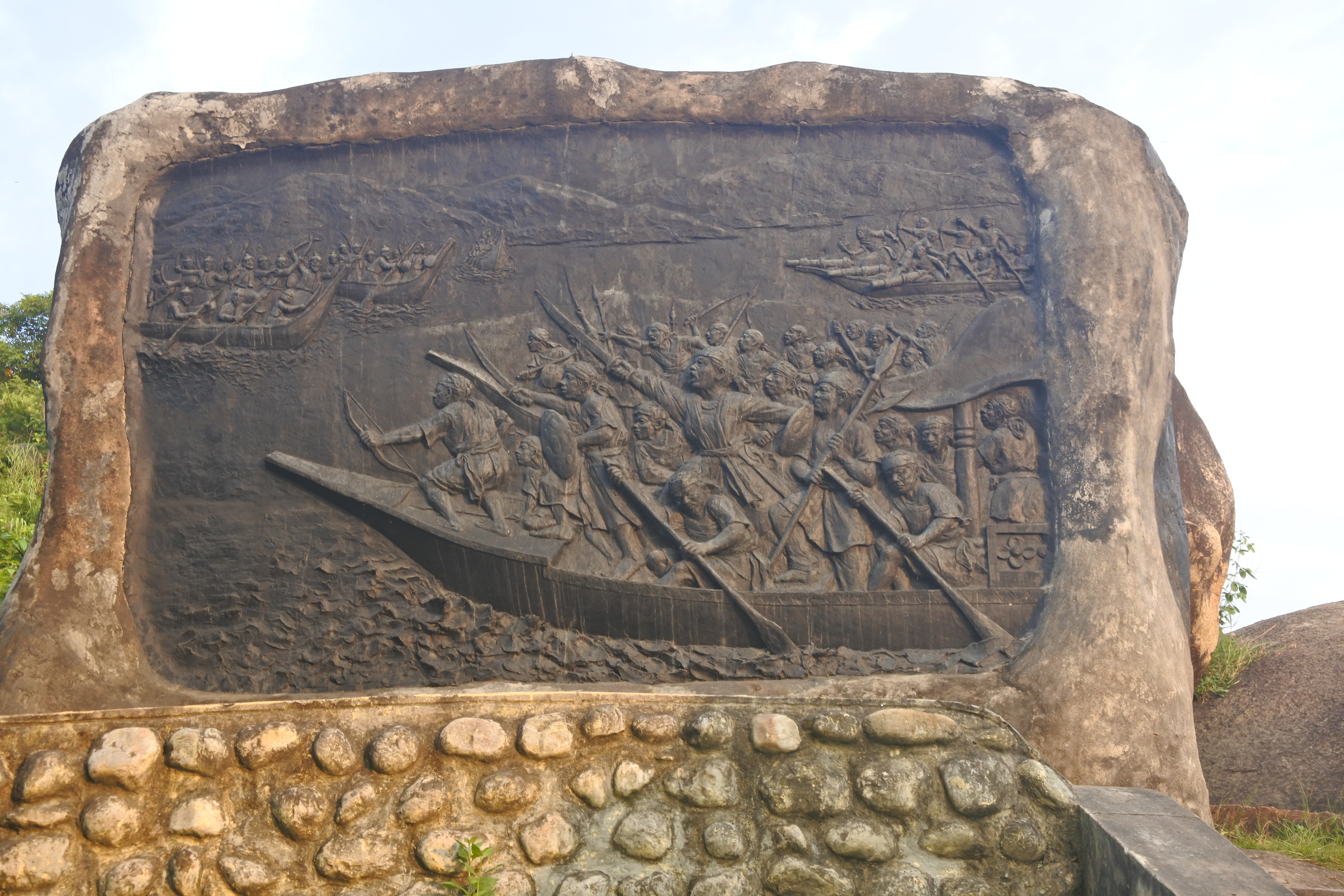
Saraighat war shown on the stone plate in Saraighat War Memorial Park

Saraighat War Memorial Park is a park at Agyathuri in North Guwahati, on the northern bank of river Brahmaputra, India. The park was constructed by Guwahati Metropolitan Development Authority, Assam. This park is constructed for preservation and promotion of the memories associated with the Battle of Saraighat.

== History ==
This battle took place between the Ahoms and the Mughals in the year 1671 A.D. The commander of the great Ahom army was Senapati, Lachit Barphukan. There are four bronze statues of Ahom warriors in battle postures in the park and a bronze plate is also there which describes a part of the battle. All these arts were created by sculptor Birendra Sinha and a team of experts from Shantiniketan.

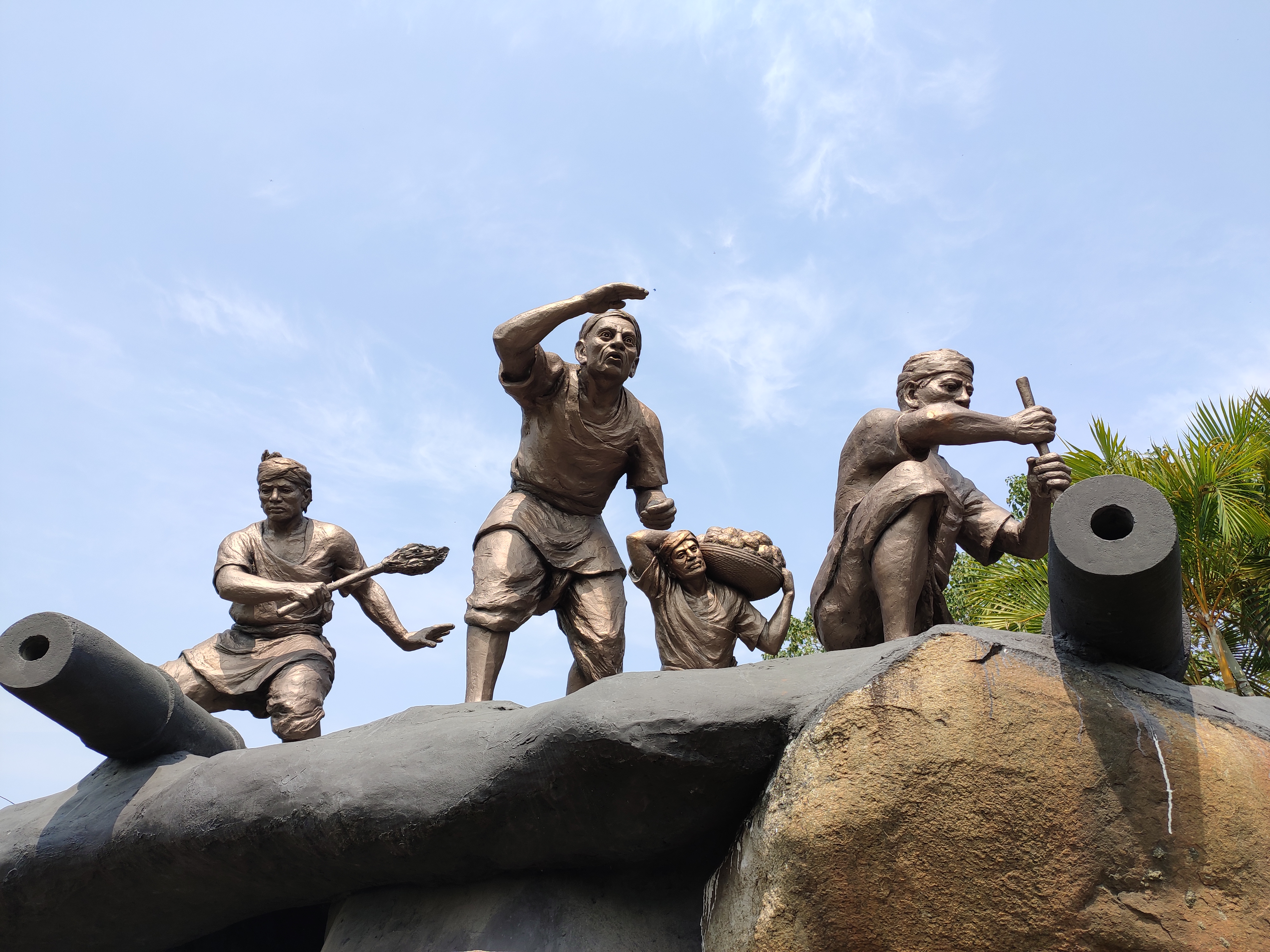
Statues of Ahom warriors in battle postures in Saraighat War Memorial Park

== See also ==
- Battle of Saraighat
