= Agyathuri =

- Town
- Location in Assam, India Agyathuri (India)
- Coordinates: 26.30°N 91.35°E
- Country: India
- State: Assam
- District: Kamrup

Languages
  - Official: Assamese
- Time zone: UTC+5:30 (IST)
- Vehicle registration: AS
- Website: kamrup.nic.in

Agyathuri is a town in Kamrup district, situated on the north bank of the Brahmaputra River near city of Guwahati. The North bank portion of the Lachit Borphukan's legendary "Momai-kata" Garh was built in this strategic location to block the Mughal army before the Battle of Saraighat. It no longer exists, maybe it became part of the public road. A Saraighat Battle Memorial was built at Agyathuri to commemorate it.

== Places of interest ==
- Ganesh Temple of Agyathuri
- Saraighat war memorial

== Transport ==
Agyathuri is at Guwahati Hajo road. All major modes of transportation are available in Agyathuri, including a railway junction.

== See also ==
- Hajo
- Rangiya
