= Memorial Park, Port of Spain =

Park in Trinidad and Tobago

Memorial Park (Port of Spain)
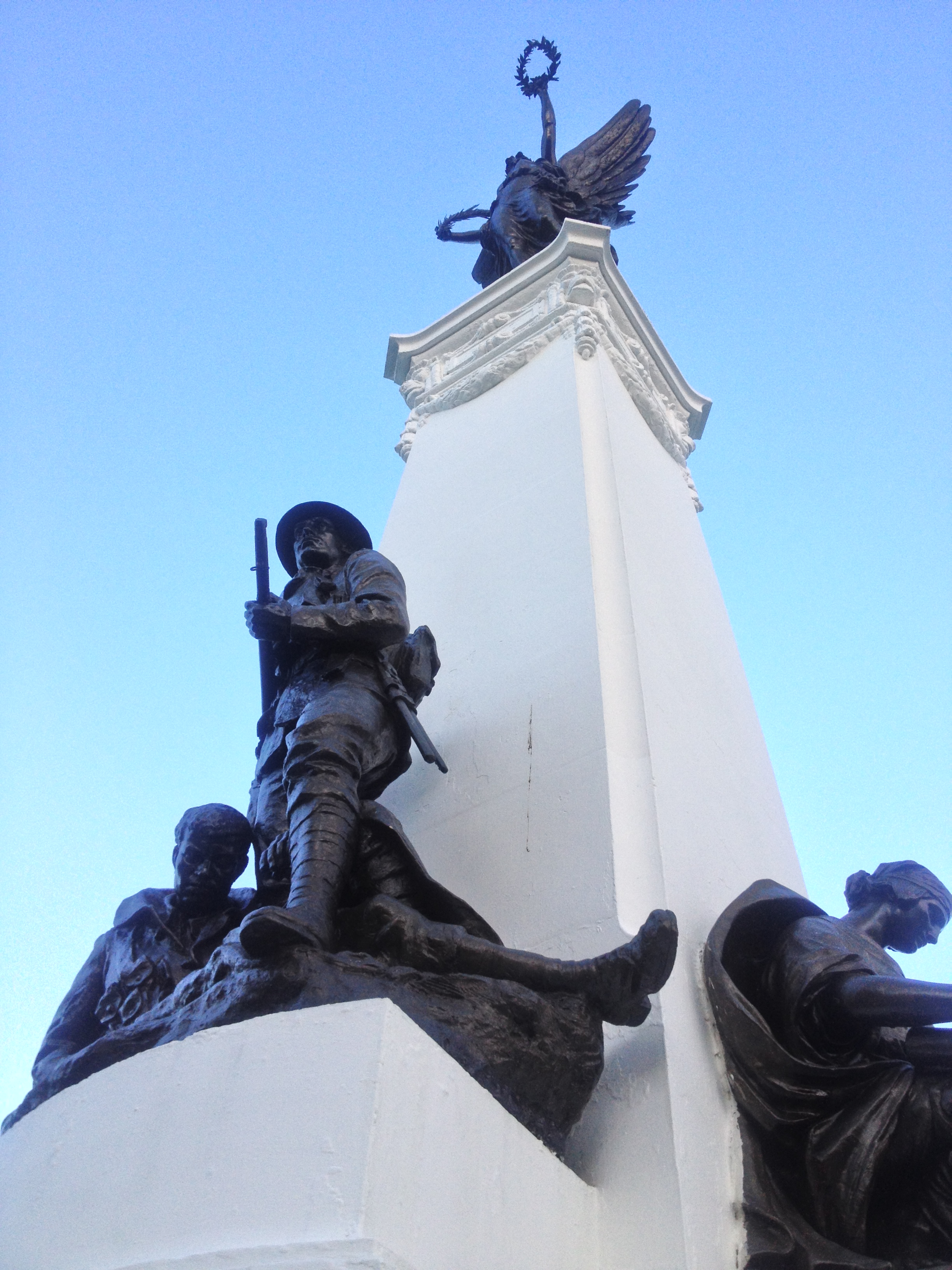
- Interactive map of Memorial Park (Port of Spain)
- Type: City park
- Location: Frederick Street, Downtown, Port of Spain, Trinidad and Tobago
- Coordinates: 10°39′49″N 61°30′35″W
- Created: 1945
- Operator: Port of Spain City Corporation
- Status: Open year round

Memorial Park is an urban park in upper Downtown, Port of Spain, Trinidad and Tobago. Memorial Park is a public city park in commemoration of the Trinidadian veterans that served in World War I and World War II. It is one of the most visited urban parks in the city.

== Location ==
Memorial Park is located south of the Queens Park Savannah, west of Charlotte Street, north of Keate Street, and adjacent to the National Academy for the Performing Arts and the National Museum and Art Gallery.
