= Zhenge Daidan Memorial Park =

Memorial park in Nangan, Lienchaing, Taiwan

- 枕戈待旦紀念公園
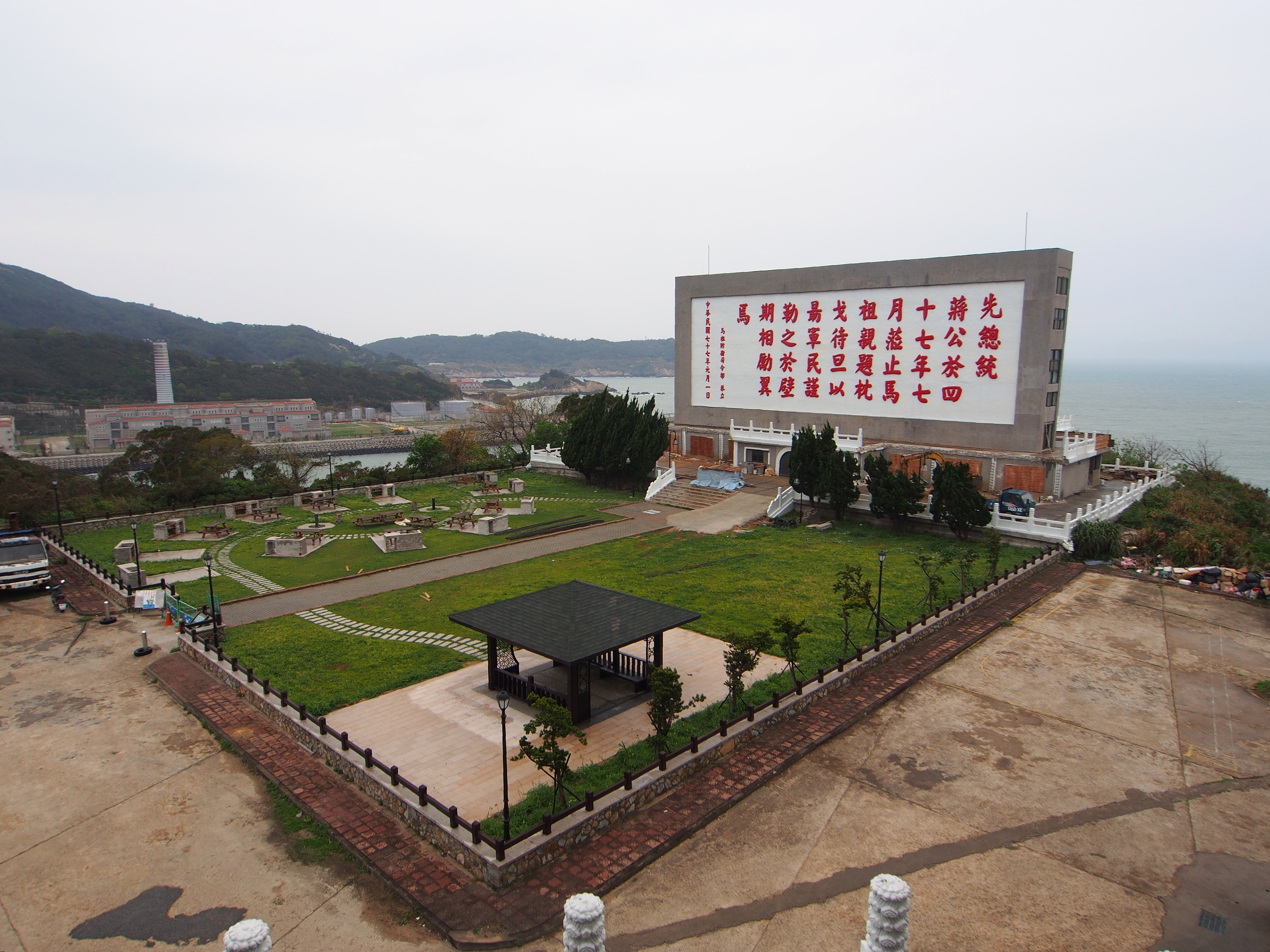
- Interactive map of Zhenge Daidan Memorial Park

Details
- Location: Nangan, Lienchiang, Taiwan
- Coordinates: 26°09′21.2″N 119°56′24.5″E
- Type: memorial park

The Zhenge Daidan Memorial Park (traditional Chinese: 枕戈待旦紀念公園; simplified Chinese: 枕戈待旦纪念公园; pinyin: Zhěngē Dàidàn jìniàn Gōngyuán) is a memorial park in Nangan Township, Lienchiang County, Taiwan.

== Architecture ==
The memorial park features a big wall with the writing Sleeping on Spears, Awaiting the Dawn (枕戈待旦). The wall forms a 4-story narrow building stands inside a park. The inscription was written by President Chiang Kai-shek during his visit in 1958 to encourage the armed forces to retake back the mainland. The memorial park is located on top of a hill which is connected by a series of steps.
