= Kinmen Peace Memorial Park =

Memorial park in Jinning, Kinmen, Taiwan

- 金門和平紀念園區
- {{{country}}}
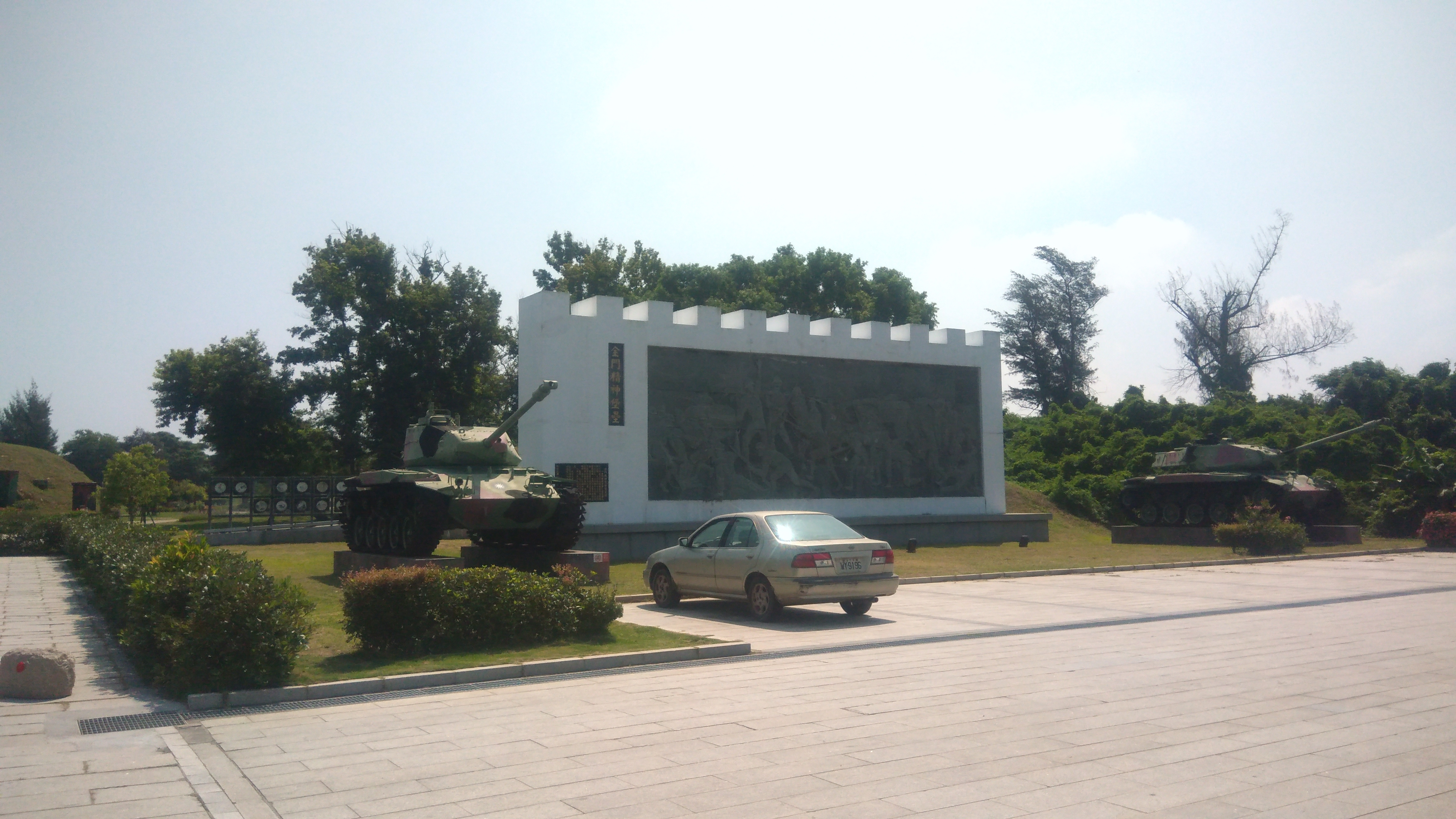
- For Battle of Guningtou
- Location: 24°28′34.8″N 118°19′01.5″E; Jinning, Kinmen, Taiwan

The Kinmen Peace Memorial Park (traditional Chinese: 金門和平紀念園區; simplified Chinese: 金门和平纪念园区; pinyin: Jīnmén Hépíng Jìniàn Yuánqū) is a memorial park in Jinning Township, Kinmen County, Taiwan.

== History ==
The memorial park was established to commemorate General Hu Lien in the victory of Battle of Guningtou.

== Architecture ==
The memorial park features a memorial hall which displays information and photos about the Battle of Guningtou and General Hu Lien. At its courtyard, lies a giant peace bell made of fragments of bombshells.
