= Memorial Park (Raymore) =

Urban park in Raymore, Missouri

- Interactive map of Memorial Park
- Type: Public park
- Location: Raymore, Missouri
- Coordinates: 38.7992°N 94.4614°W
- Area: 20 acres (8.1 ha)
- Operator: City of Raymore
- Status: Open all year

Memorial Park is a public, urban park in Raymore, Missouri. Located at 400 Park Lane in Raymore, Memorial Park is bordered by Raymore Elementary School on the East and Lucy Webb Road on the South. The park contains a pleasant mix of passive and active space. It is also home numerous community events and festivals.
