= Chiang family =

Republic of China political family

Chiang 蔣
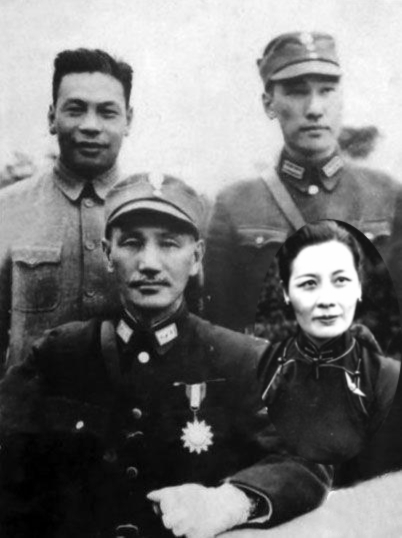
- Chiang Kai-shek, Soong May-ling, Chiang Ching-kuo, and Chiang Wei-guo.
- Country: Republic of China
- Current region: Taiwan
- Origin: Fenghua, Zhejiang
- Titles: President of the Republic of China; Premier of the Republic of China; Generalissimo
- Members: Chiang Chi-tseng; Chiang Ssu-chien; Chiang Chao-hai; Chiang Chao-tsung; Chiang Kai-shek; Chiang Ching-kuo; Chiang Fang-liang; Chiang Hsiao-yen; Chiang Hsiao-wu; Chiang Hsiao-yung; Chiang Hsiao-wen; Chiang Hsiao-chang; Chiang Wan-an; Chiang Hui-lan; Chiang Hui-yun; Demos Chiang; Yao Yecheng; Chiang Wei-kuo (adopted)
- Connected families: Soong family

The Chiang family (Chinese: 蔣中正家族／蔣介石家族) is a political family of the Republic of China with Wu Chinese background from Zhejiang province. Members of a prosperous family of salt merchants, the Chiang family held senior positions in Chinese politics first in mainland China and then in Taiwan after 1949.

Members include Chinese Nationalist politician, revolutionary and military leader Chiang Kai-shek, who served as the leader of the Republic of China from 1928 to 1975. Chiang Ching-kuo, President of the Republic of China (1978–1988), Chiang Hsiao-yen, Vice Chairman of the Kuomintang (2009–2014), and more.

Chiang Kai-shek and Chiang Ching-kuo, who have been presidents of the Republic of China, are often called collectively as “Two Chiangs” (兩蔣).

== Origin ==
The Chiang family ancestral home is in Heqiao (和橋鎮), a town in Yixing, Jiangsu, about 38 km (24 mi) southwest of central Wuxi and 10 km (6.2 mi) from the shores of Lake Tai. Eventually the clan settled in Xikou, a town in Fenghua, Zhejiang, about 30 kilometers (19 mi) west of central Ningbo, where Chiang Kai-shek was born.

== Offices held ==
Chiang Kai-shek (1887–1975)

- Chairman of the National Government of the Republic of China (1928–1931, 1943–1948)
- President of the Republic of China (1948–1949, 1950–1975)

Chiang Ching-kuo (1910–1988)

- Premier of the Republic of China (1972–1978)
- President of the Republic of China (1978–1988). Son of Chiang Kai-shek.

Chiang Hsiao-yen (1942–)

- Ministry of Foreign Affairs of the Republic of China (1996–1997)
- Member of the Legislative Yuan (2002–2012)
- Vice Chairman of the Kuomintang (2009–2014)

Chiang Hsiao-wu (1945–1991)

- President of the state-run Broadcasting Corporation of China (1980–1986)

Chiang Wan-an (1978–)

- Member of the Legislative Yuan (2016–2022)
- Mayor of Taipei (2022–)

Demos Chiang (1976–)

- Chairman, DEM Inc.

== Family tree ==
Chiang family tree

Soong May‑ling 宋美齡	Mao Fumei 毛福梅	Chiang Kai‑shek 蔣介石	Yao Yecheng 姚冶誠	Chen Jieru 陳潔如
Faina Chiang Fang‑liang 蔣方良	Chiang Ching-kuo 蔣經國	Chang Ya‑juo 章亞若 (mistress)	Shih Chin‑i 石靜宜	Chiang Wei‑kuo 蔣緯國 (adopted)	Chiu Ju‑hsüeh 丘如雪	Chen Yao‑kuang 陳瑶光 (adopted)
Alan Chiang Hsiao‑wen 蔣孝文	Amy Chiang Hsiao‑chang 蔣孝章	Alex Chiang Hsiao‑wu 蔣孝武	Eddie Chiang Hsiao‑yung 蔣孝勇	Winston Chang Hsiao‑tzu 章孝慈	John Chiang Hsiao‑yen 蔣孝嚴	Chiang Hsiao‑kang 蔣孝剛
Nancy Xu Nai‑jin 徐乃錦	Yu Yang‑ho 俞揚和	Wang Zhang‑shi 汪長詩	Michelle Tsai Hui‑mei 蔡惠媚	Elizabeth Fang Chi‑yi 方智怡	Chao Chung‑te 趙申德	Helen Huang Mei‑lun 黃美倫	Wang Yi‑hui 王倚惠
Theodore Yu Tsu‑sheng 俞祖聲	Chang Ching‑sung 章勁松	Chang Yo‑chu 章友菊	Vivian Chiang Hui‑lan 蔣惠蘭	Chiang Hui‑yün 蔣惠筠	Chiang Wan-an 蔣萬安
Chiang Yo‑mei 蔣友梅	Alexandra Chiang Yo‑lan 蔣友蘭	Johnathan Chiang Yo‑sung 蔣友松	Demos Chiang Yo‑bo 蔣友柏	Edward Chiang Yo‑chang 蔣友常	Andrew Chiang Yo‑ching 蔣友青	Chiang Yo‑chüan 蔣友娟	Chiang Yo‑chieh 蔣友捷

Notes
- Dashed lines represent marriages
- Dotted lines represent extra-marital relationships and adoptions
- Solid lines represent descendants

== See also ==
- Four big families of the Republic of China
