= Chiang Wei-kuo =

Adopted son of Chiang Kai-shek (1916–1997)

- 蔣緯國
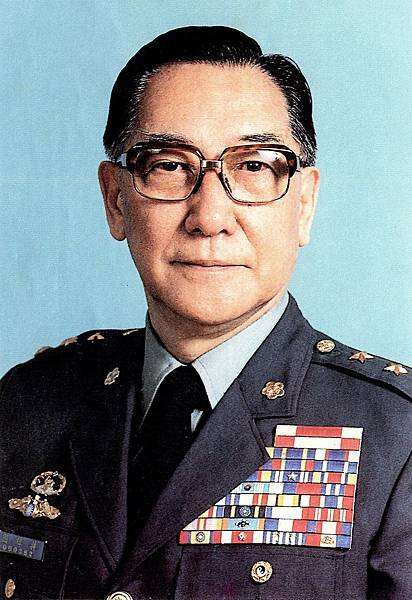
- Chiang as a general of the Republic of China Army, c. 1980s

4th Secretary-General of the National Security Council of the Republic of China
- In office 18 June 1986 – 28 February 1993
- President: Chiang Ching-kuo; Lee Tung-hui
- Preceded by: Wang Tao-yuan
- Succeeded by: Shih Chi-yang

12th Commander-in-Chief of the Combined Services Force of the Republic of China
- In office 7 April 1980 – 30 June 1984
- President: Chiang Ching-kuo
- Preceded by: Wang To-nien
- Succeeded by: Wen Ha-hsiung

2nd President of the Tri-service University
- In office 16 August 1975 – 6 June 1980
- President: Yen Chia-kan; Chiang Ching-kuo
- Preceded by: Yu Po-chuan
- Succeeded by: Wang To-nien

3rd President of the Republic of China Army Command and Staff University
- In office 1 September 1963 – 31 August 1968
- President: Chiang Kai-shek
- Preceded by: Wu Wen-chi
- Succeeded by: Lu Fu-ning

Personal details
- Born: 6 October 1916 Tokyo, Empire of Japan
- Died: 22 September 1997 (aged 80) Taipei Veterans General Hospital, Taipei, Taiwan
- Resting place: Wuzhi Mountain Military Cemetery
- Party: Kuomintang
- Spouses: Shih Chin-i (m. 1944; died 1953) Ellen Chiu (m. 1957–1997)
- Children: 1
- Parent(s): Tai Chi-tao (biological father); Shigematsu Kaneko (重松金子) (biological mother); Chiang Kai-shek (adoptive father); Yao Yecheng (adoptive mother)
- Education: Soochow University; Central Military Academy; Munich Kriegsschule; Command and Staff College
- Occupation: Politician
- Awards: Order of Blue Sky and White Sun

Military service
- Allegiance: Nazi Germany (1936–1939); Republic of China (1936, 1939–1997)
- Branch/service: German Army; National Revolutionary Army; Republic of China Army
- Years of service: 1936–1997
- Rank: Leutnant (Germany); General (Republic of China)
- Unit: 98. Mountain Infantry Regiment; 8. Infantry Division; First Infantry Division (China); First Armoured Regiment
- Commands: Commander-in-Chief of Armoured Forces
- Battles/wars: Anschluss; Annexation of the Sudetenland; Second Sino-Japanese War; Chinese Civil War

Chinese name
- Traditional Chinese: 蔣緯國
- Simplified Chinese: 蒋纬国
Transcriptions
Standard Mandarin
- Hanyu Pinyin: Jiǎng Wěiguó
- Wade–Giles: Chiang^{3} Wei^{3}-kuo^{2}

Chiang Wei-kuo (Chinese: 蔣緯國; 6 October 1916 – 22 September 1997), also known as Wego Chiang, was the adopted son of Republic of China President Chiang Kai-shek, the adoptive brother of President Chiang Ching-kuo, a retired Army general, and an important figure in the Kuomintang. His courtesy names were Jian'gao (建鎬) and Niantang (念堂). Chiang served in the Wehrmacht before fighting in the Second Sino-Japanese War and Chinese Civil War.

== Early life ==
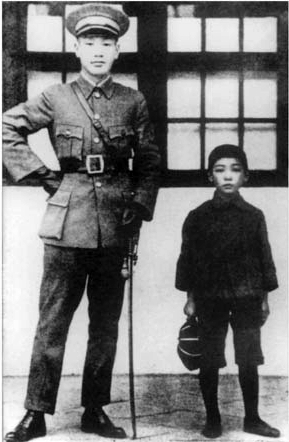
Chiang Wei-kuo (right), age 8, with father Chiang Kai-shek (left)

As one of two sons of Chiang Kai-shek, Chiang Wei-kuo's name has a particular meaning as intended by his father. Wei literally means "parallel (of latitude)" while kuo means "nation"; in his brother's name, Ching literally means "longitude". The names are inspired by the references in Chinese classics such as the Guoyu, in which "to draw the longitudes and latitudes of the world" is used as a metaphor for a person with great abilities, especially in managing a country.

Born in Tokyo when Chiang Kai-shek and the KMT were exiled to Japan by the Beiyang Government, Chiang Wei-kuo was the biological son of Dai Jitao and a Japanese woman, Shigematsu Kaneko (重松金子). Chiang Wei-kuo previously discredited any such claims and insisted he was a biological son of Chiang Kai-shek until his later years (1988), when he admitted that he was adopted.

According to reliable rumors, Dai believed knowledge of his Japanese tryst would destroy his marriage and his career, so he entrusted Wei-kuo to Chiang Kai-shek, after Yamada Juntarō (山田純太郎) brought the infant to Shanghai. Yao Yecheng, a concubine of Chiang Kai-shek at the time, raised Wei-kuo as his foster mother. The boy called Dai his "Dear Uncle" (親伯).

Chiang moved to the Chiang ancestral home in Xikou Town of Fenghua in 1920. Wei-kuo later studied physics at Soochow University.

== In the Wehrmacht ==
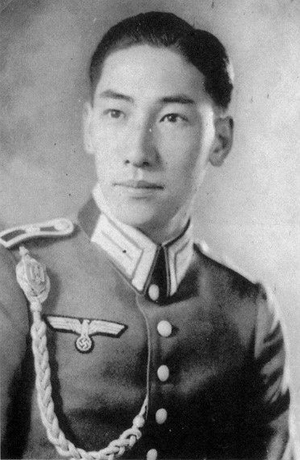
Chiang as a Wehrmacht officer candidate (Fahnenjunker), c.1938

His sibling, Chiang Ching-kuo, a student-turned-political-prisoner in Joseph Stalin's Soviet Union, served as the impetus behind Chiang's sending Wei-kuo to Nazi Germany for a military education at the Kriegsschule in Munich.

At the Kriegsschule, he studied the German army's advanced methods, structure, and weaponry. He was specifically drawn by the then-theoretical machine gun company, which would use the Maschinengewehr (i.e., a medium machine gun) as the main weapon. The Maschinengewehr was the MG 34 then: a fast and reliable gun. The machine gun company would cooperate with air and armored units to assist the infantry's attack. This would be called the Bewegungskrieg ("War of Movement"), and it would be very effective in the future World War II. After completing this training, Wei-kuo completed specialized training in Alpine warfare, thus earning him the coveted Gebirgsjäger Edelweiss sleeve insignia. Wei-kuo was promoted to Fahnenjunker ("Officer Candidate"), and received a Schützenschnur lanyard.

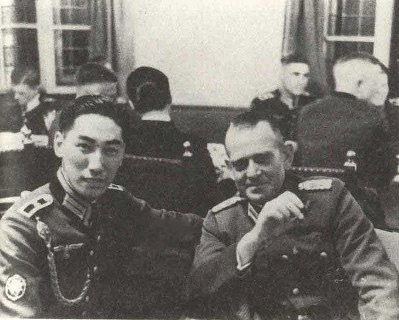
Chiang Wei-kuo with other Wehrmacht officers

Wei-kuo commanded a Panzer unit during the 1938 Austrian Anschluss as a Fähnrich, or "sergeant officer-candidate", leading a tank into that country. Subsequently, he was promoted to Lieutenant of a Panzer unit and awaited the Invasion of Poland. Before he was given the mobilization order, he was recalled to China to assist the war effort against the invading Japanese forces.

== Service during the Second Sino-Japanese War ==
Upon being recalled from Germany, Chiang Wei-kuo visited the United States as a distinguished guest of the US Army on behalf of his father and the Kuomintang. While in the United States, he gave lectures detailing German army organizations and tactics. During the war, Chiang Wei-kuo became acquainted with generals in Northwestern China and organized an armour mechanized battalion to formally take part in the National Revolutionary Army. Chiang Wei-kuo was stationed at a garrison in Xi'an in 1941. In addition, he spent some time at Fort Knox, Kentucky, studying tanks at the U.S. Army Armored School in 1940. Wei-kuo would become a Major at 28, a Lieutenant Colonel at 29, a Colonel at 32 whilst in charge of a tank battalion, and later in Taiwan, a Major General.

== Service during the Chinese Civil War ==
During the Chinese Civil War, Chiang Wei-kuo employed tactics he had learned whilst studying in the German Wehrmacht. He was in charge of a tank battalion of the 1st Tank Regiment (equipped with Soviet T-26 light tanks and Italian CV-33/35 tankettes) during the Huaihai Campaign against Mao Zedong's troops, scoring some early victories. While it was not enough to win the campaign, he was able to pull back without significant problems. Like many troops and refugees of the Kuomintang, he retreated from Shanghai to Taiwan and moved his tank regiment to Taiwan, becoming a divisional strength regiment commander of the armoured corps stationed outside of Taipei.

== Taiwan ==
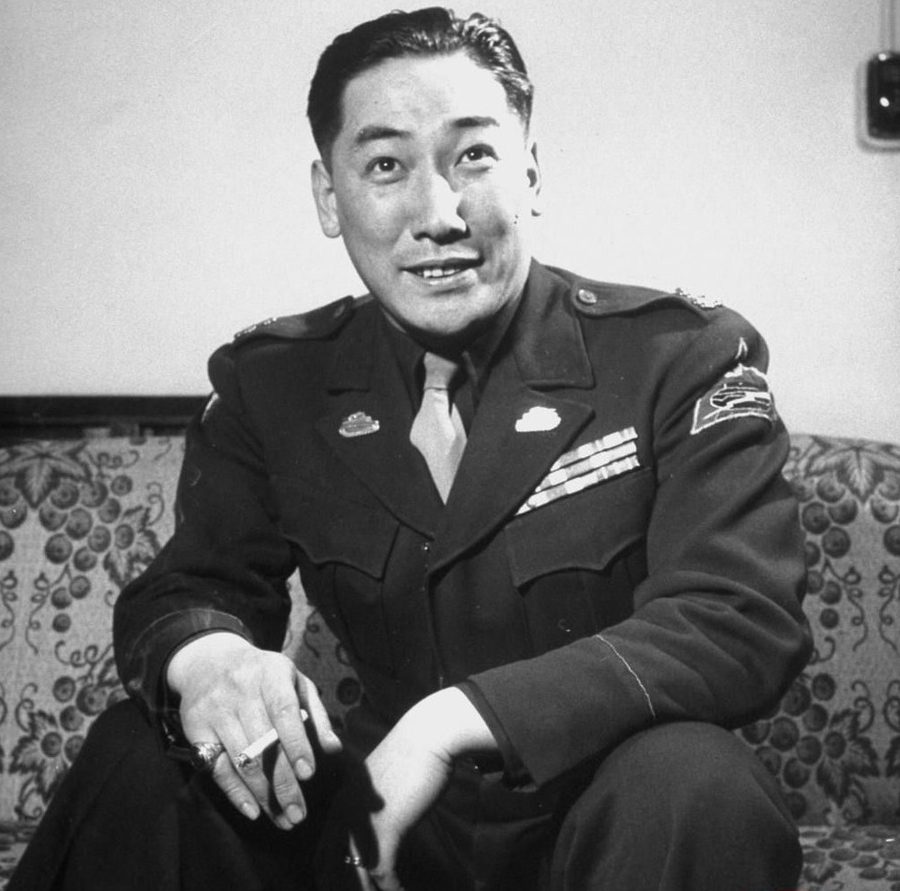
Chiang Wei-kuo in Taiwan, 1950

Chiang Wei-kuo continued to hold senior positions in the Republic of China Armed Forces following the ROC retreat to Taiwan. In 1964, following the Hukou Incident and his subordinate Chao Chih-hwa's attempted coup d'état, Chiang Wei-kuo was in the penalty box and never held any authority in the military.

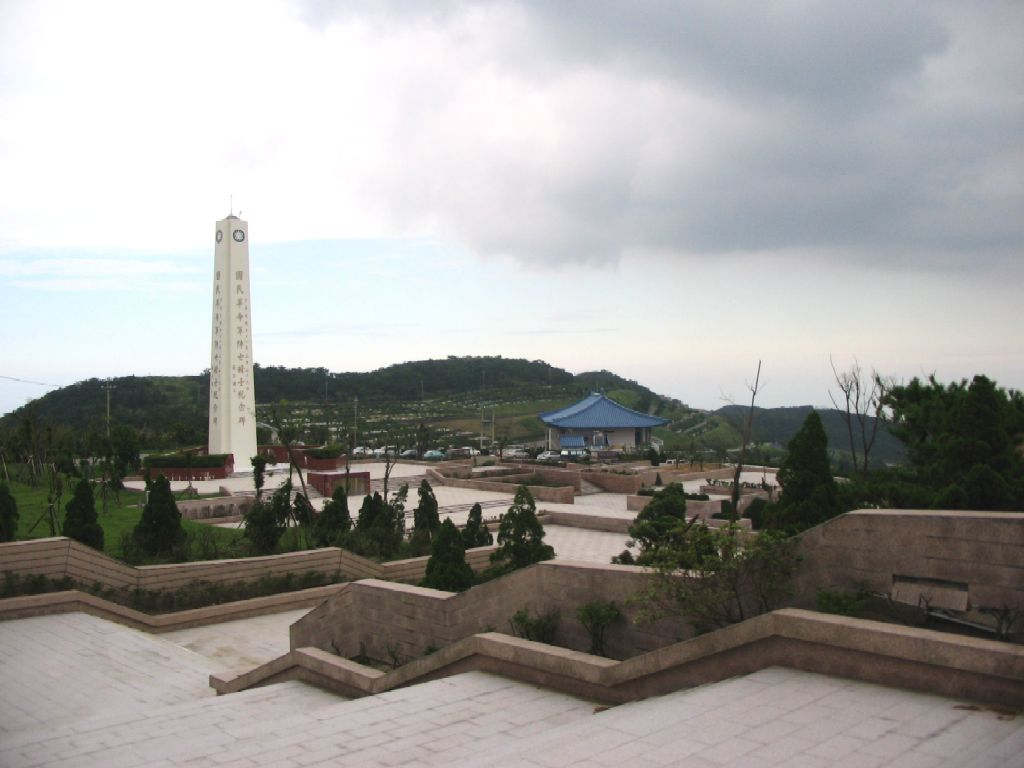
Chiang Wei-kuo is buried in Wuzhi Mountain Military Cemetery in New Taipei City

From 1964 onwards, Chiang Wei-kuo made preparations in establishing a school dedicated to teaching warfare strategy; such a school was established in 1969. In 1975, Chiang Wei-kuo was further promoted to the position of general, and served as president of the Armed Forces University. In 1980, Chiang served as joint logistics commander in chief; then in 1986, he retired from the army and became National Security Council Secretary-General.

After Chiang Ching-kuo's death, Chiang Wei-kuo was a political rival of native Taiwanese Lee Teng-hui, and he strongly opposed Lee's Taiwan localization movement. Chiang ran as vice-president with Taiwan Governor Lin Yang-kang in the 1990 ROC indirect presidential election. Lee ran as the KMT presidential candidate and defeated the Lin-Chiang ticket.

== Personal life ==
In 1944, he married Shih Chin-i (石靜宜), the daughter of Shih Feng-hsiang (石鳳翔), a textile tycoon from North West China. Shih died in 1953 during childbirth. Wei-kuo later established the Chingshin Elementary School (靜心小學) in Taipei to commemorate his late wife.

In 1957, Chiang remarried, to Ellen Chiu Ju-hsüeh (丘如雪), also known as Chiu Ai-lun (邱愛倫), a daughter of Chinese and German parents. Chiu gave birth to Chiang's only son, Chiang Hsiao-kang, (蔣孝剛) in 1962. Chiang Hsiao-kang is the youngest of the Hsiao generation of the Chiang family.

Chiang Wei-kuo was also quite active in civil society, where he was the founder of the Chinese Institute of Strategy and Sino-German Cultural and Economic Association, as well as the Chairman of the Republic of China Football Association. He was the first chairman of Chingshin Primary School (靜心小學) and served as the president of the United States Students Association of China.

Chiang was a Freemason, and was the Grand Master of the Grand Lodge of China from 1968 to 1969.

== Final years ==
In the early 1990s, Chiang Wei-kuo established an unofficial Spirit Relocation Committee (奉安移靈小組) to petition the Communist government to allow his adopted father Chiang Kai-shek and brother Chiang Ching-kuo to be interred in mainland China. His request was largely ignored by both the Nationalist and Communist governments, and he was persuaded to abandon the petition by his father's widow Soong Mei-ling in November 1996.

In 1991, Chiang's housemaid, Li Hung-mei (李洪美, or 李嫂) was found dead in Chiang's estate in Taipei City. The following police investigation discovered a stockpile of sixty guns on Chiang's estate. Chiang himself admitted the possibility of a link between the guns and his maid's death, which was later ruled a suicide by the police. The incident permanently tarnished Chiang Wei-kuo's name, at a time when the Chiang family was increasingly unpopular on Taiwan and even within the Nationalist Party.

In 1993, Chiang Wei-kuo was employed as a senior advisor to President Lee Teng-hui despite their previous political rivalry.

In 1994, a hospital was supposed to be named after him (蔣緯國醫療中心) in Sanchih, Taipei County (now New Taipei City), after an unnamed politician donated to Ruentex Financial Group (潤泰企業集團), whose founder was from Sanchih. Politicians questioned the motivation.

In 1996, the Chiang home on military land was finally demolished by the order of the Taipei municipal government under Chen Shui-bian. The estate had been constructed in 1971. After Chiang moved elsewhere in 1981, he deeded it to his son. The justification was that his son was not in military service and thus was not entitled to live there.

Chiang Wei-kuo died at the age of 80, on 22 September 1997, from kidney failure. He had been experiencing falling blood pressure complicated by diabetes after a 10-month stay at Taipei Veterans General Hospital, Taipei. He had wished to be buried in Suzhou on the mainland but was instead buried at Wuchih Mountain Military Cemetery.

Chiang family tree

Soong May‑ling 宋美齡	Mao Fumei 毛福梅	Chiang Kai‑shek 蔣介石	Yao Yecheng 姚冶誠	Chen Jieru 陳潔如
Faina Chiang Fang‑liang 蔣方良	Chiang Ching-kuo 蔣經國	Chang Ya‑juo 章亞若 (mistress)	Shih Chin‑i 石靜宜	Chiang Wei‑kuo 蔣緯國 (adopted)	Chiu Ju‑hsüeh 丘如雪	Chen Yao‑kuang 陳瑶光 (adopted)
Alan Chiang Hsiao‑wen 蔣孝文	Amy Chiang Hsiao‑chang 蔣孝章	Alex Chiang Hsiao‑wu 蔣孝武	Eddie Chiang Hsiao‑yung 蔣孝勇	Winston Chang Hsiao‑tzu 章孝慈	John Chiang Hsiao‑yen 蔣孝嚴	Chiang Hsiao‑kang 蔣孝剛
Nancy Xu Nai‑jin 徐乃錦	Yu Yang‑ho 俞揚和	Wang Zhang‑shi 汪長詩	Michelle Tsai Hui‑mei 蔡惠媚	Elizabeth Fang Chi‑yi 方智怡	Chao Chung‑te 趙申德	Helen Huang Mei‑lun 黃美倫	Wang Yi‑hui 王倚惠
Theodore Yu Tsu‑sheng 俞祖聲	Chang Ching‑sung 章勁松	Chang Yo‑chu 章友菊	Vivian Chiang Hui‑lan 蔣惠蘭	Chiang Hui‑yün 蔣惠筠	Chiang Wan-an 蔣萬安
Chiang Yo‑mei 蔣友梅	Alexandra Chiang Yo‑lan 蔣友蘭	Johnathan Chiang Yo‑sung 蔣友松	Demos Chiang Yo‑bo 蔣友柏	Edward Chiang Yo‑chang 蔣友常	Andrew Chiang Yo‑ching 蔣友青	Chiang Yo‑chüan 蔣友娟	Chiang Yo‑chieh 蔣友捷

Notes
- Dashed lines represent marriages
- Dotted lines represent extra-marital relationships and adoptions
- Solid lines represent descendants

== Political and military career ==
His positions in the Republic of China government included:

- Commander of the Army Armored Forces (陸軍裝甲兵司令)
- Commander-in-Chief of the Combined Services Force (聯勤總司令)
- President of the Army Command and Staff College (陸軍指揮参謀大學校長)
- President of the Tri-service University (三軍大學校長)
- Senior advisor of the Office of the President (中華民國總統府資政)
- Secretary-General of the National Security Council (國安會議秘書長)

Full list of military, and civil government positions held:

Military, civil and government positions held
- National Revolutionary Army officer Lieutenant attendant (1936)
- German Seventh Army trainee (In November 1936 -1937)
- German Army Mountain Division soldiers, 98th Regiment, 2nd Battalion, 5th Company (November 1937 – 1938)
- German Army Mountain Division soldiers eighth lieutenant (1938–1939)
- NRA First Division Army 3rd Regiment, 2nd Battalion, 5th Company platoon leader (1941)
- NRA First Division Army 3rd Regiment, 2nd Battalion, 5th Company Commander (1941)
- NRA First Division Army 3rd Regiment, 2nd Battalion deputy battalion commander (1942–1944)
- NRA First Division Army 3rd Regiment, 2nd Battalion battalion commander (1944–1945)
- Youth Expedition 206 Division, 616 Battalion, 2nd Regiment (1945)
- Third Department of the Army armored corps training Director (1945)
- Army Corps armored fighting vehicles training, fourth regiment group leader (1945–1946)
- Army Corps armored fighting vehicles training, first regiment group leader (1946–1947)
- Army Corps armored fighting vehicles training, first regiment commander (1947-?)
- Nanjing Private Secondary School in Yining founder (1948)
- Armored Force Command Chief of Staff (1948–1949)
- Armored Force Command deputy commander (1949 – 1 March 1950)
- Armored brigade (1st term) Brigadier (1 March 1950 – 1 June 1953)
- Yi Ning, chairman of private secondary school, Taichung City (November 1951 – June 1953)
- Jingxin Primary School chairman (1956–1968)
- Fifth Department of Defense Director of the Office (1958–unknown)
- Armored Force Command (4th term) Commander (1 August 1958 – 1 August 1963)
- Department of Defense senior staff
- Defense Planning Committee, deputy director of joint operations
- Dean of the Army Command and Staff College (1 September 1963 – 1 September 1968)
- Sino-German Cultural and Economic Association (1963–1986)
- Armed Forces University Vice-Chancellor (1968 – 16 August 1975)
- Armed Forces War College University of Institutionalized Persons (1 December 1969)
- Armed Forces University, Dean of war (1 December 1969 – 7 April 1980)
- Armed Forces University President (16 August 1975 – 7 April 1980)
- Central Consultative Committee of the Kuomintang (1976–unknown)
- Founder of the Chinese Institute of Strategy (1979)
- Taipei Football Association (29 April 1980 – 25 March 1982)
- Chief of the General Command of the Joint Duty (7 April 1980 – July 1984)
- Meihua Sports Promotion Campaign Committee vice chairman (1980 – 22 September 1997)
- Joint Operations Training Officer (1 July 1984 – 18 June 1986)
- National Security Council Secretary-General (18 June 1986 – 28 February 1993)
- Bureau of the Kuomintang Chairman of the Central Consultative Committee (1988–unknown)
- Chairman of the Chinese Institute of Strategy (1990–unknown)
- National Unity Committee
- Presidential advisor (28 February 1993 – 22 September 1997)
- Rotary Club of Taipei

== Education history ==
- Department of Physics, Soochow University
- Tenth Central Military Academy
- Munich Military Academy (1938)
- U.S. Army Air Corps Tactical School (1940)
- U.S. Armored School in India (1943)
- Round Mountain Academy advanced officer corps training (1951),
- U.S. Army Command and Staff College formal training classes (1953)
- School of Social Practice Class III combat training (1955)
- Practical Advanced Military Studies Research Society training classes (1963)

== Written works ==
- Grand Strategy Summary 《大戰略概說》
- A Summary of National Strategy 《國家戰略概說》
- The strategic value of Taiwan in the world 《臺灣在世局中的戰略價值》(1977)
- The Middle Way and Life 《中道與人生》 (1979)
- Soft military offensive 《柔性攻勢》
- The basic principles of the military system 《軍制基本原理》(1974)
- The Z that creates this age 《創造這個時代的Z》

== Gallery ==
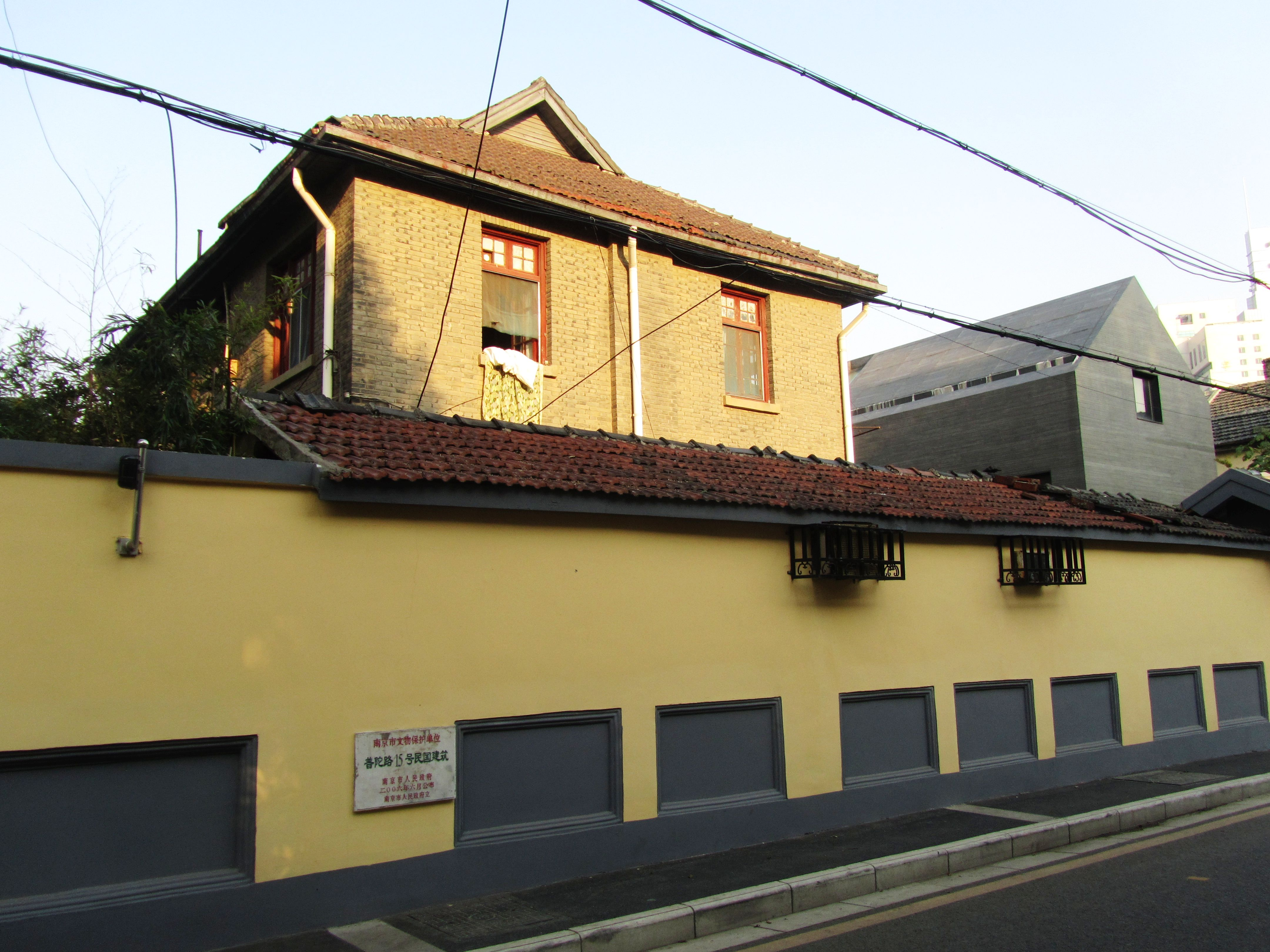
Former residence of Chiang Wei-kuo in Nanjing

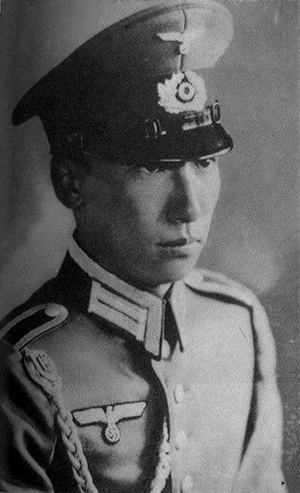
Chiang Wei-Kuo as an officer candidate in the German Army, 1938

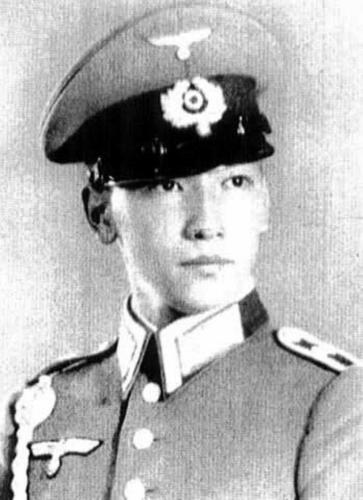
Chiang Wei-kuo as a Fanhnenjunker (cadet) in the Wehrmacht prior to 1939

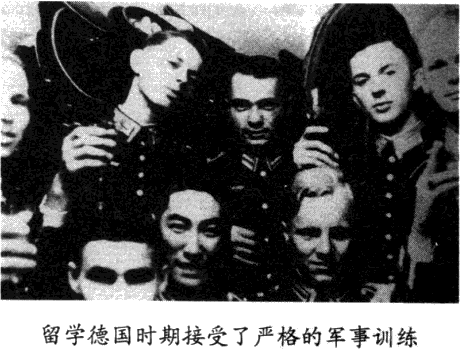
Chiang Wei-kuo in Germany with other Wehrmacht officer candidates, prior to 1939

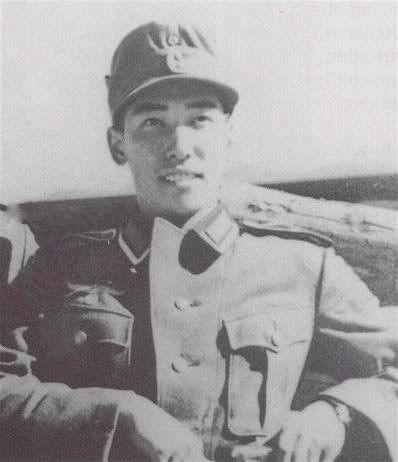
Chiang Wei-kuo in German Army mountain troop (Gebirgsjager) field attire with the characteristic 'Bergmutze' field cap

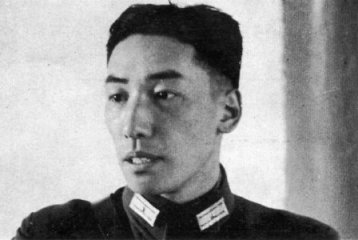
Chiang Wei-kuo in the National Revolutionary Army in 1941, as a second lieutenant stationed in Xi'an

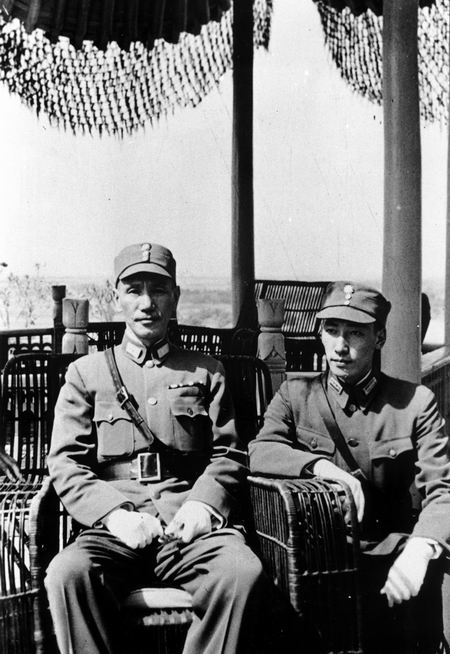
Chiang Wei-kuo (right), with father Chiang Kai-shek (left), 1941

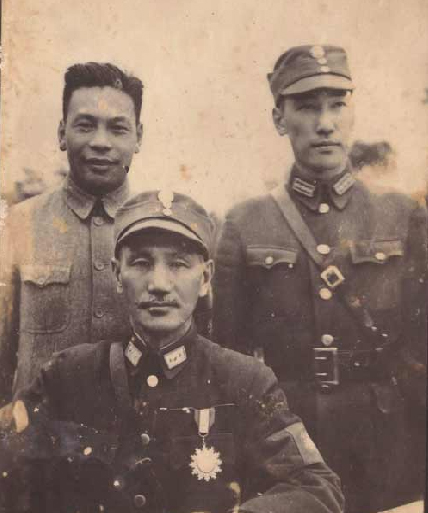
Chiang Kai-shek (front) with his sons Chiang Ching-kuo (rear, left) and Chiang Wei-kuo (rear, right)

== See also ==
- Sino-German cooperation
- History of the Republic of China
- Military of the Republic of China
