= Chiang Fang-liang =

First Lady of the Republic of China, wife of Chiang Ching-kuo (1916–2004)

- 蔣方良; Фаина Вахрева
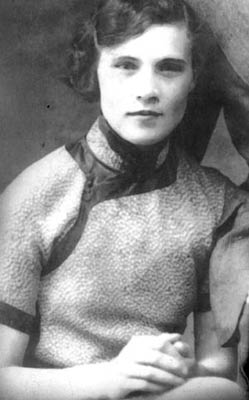
- Chiang in 1944

3rd First Lady of the Republic of China
- In role 20 May 1978 – 13 January 1988
- President: Chiang Ching-kuo
- Preceded by: Liu Chi-chun
- Succeeded by: Tseng Wen-hui

Spouse of the Premier of the Republic of China
- In role 1 June 1972 – 20 May 1978
- Prime Minister: Chiang Ching-kuo
- Preceded by: Liu Chi-chun
- Succeeded by: Hsu Huang-chen (acting)

Personal details
- Born: Faina Ipatyevna Vakhreva; 15 May 1916 Gavrilov-Yam, Russia
- Died: 15 December 2004 (aged 88) Taipei Veterans General Hospital, Taipei, Taiwan
- Resting place: Daxi Presidential Burial Place; Touliao, Taiwan
- Spouse: Chiang Ching-kuo (m. 1935; died 1988)
- Children: Chiang Hsiao-wen; Chiang Hsiao-wu; Chiang Hsiao-yung; Chiang Hsiao-chang

Chiang Fang-liang

Chinese name
- Traditional Chinese: 蔣方良
Transcriptions
Standard Mandarin
- Hanyu Pinyin: Jiǎng Fāngliáng
Hakka
- Pha̍k-fa-sṳ: Chióng Fong-liòng
Southern Min
- Hokkien POJ: Chiúⁿ Png-liông

Russian name
- Russian: Фаина Ипатьевна Вахрева
- Romanization: Faina Ipatyevna Vakhreva

Faina Chiang Fang-liang, (Note: Chinese: 蔣方良; pinyin: Jiǎng Fāngliáng.) born Faina Ipatyevna Vakhreva (Note: Russian: Фаина Ипатьевна Вахрева; Belarusian: Фаіна Іпацьеўна Вахрава, romanized: Faina Ipatsyewna Vakhrava.) (15 May 1916 – 15 December 2004), was the First Lady of the Republic of China on Taiwan from 1978 to 1988 as the wife of President Chiang Ching-kuo.

== Early life ==
Faina Ipatyevna Vakhreva was born on 15 May 1916 in Gavrilov-Yam, situated near Yaroslavl in Russia. Her father, Ipaty, was an ethnic Belarusian who had moved to central Russia from Orsha in present-day Belarus, according to several sources. After moving, he changed his surname to make it sound Russian. Faina's father and mother worked in a linen spinning mill.

Faina was orphaned at a young age and raised by her older sister, Anna. As Faina's sister was 17 years older than her, Anna became known as her "sister-mother".

== Career ==
At age 16, as a member of the Soviet Union's Communist Youth League, Faina worked at the Ural Heavy Machinery Plant in Sverdlovsk, Russia, where she met Chiang Ching-kuo, her supervisor. On 15 March 1935, aged 18, Faina married him.

== Move to China ==
In December 1936, Joseph Stalin granted Chiang's return to China. After the couple was received by Chiang Kai-shek and his wife Soong Mei-ling in Hangzhou, they traveled to the Chiang home in Xikou, Zhejiang, where they held a second marriage ceremony. Fang-liang stayed behind to live with Chiang Ching-kuo's mother, Mao Fumei. She was assigned a tutor to learn Mandarin Chinese, but she learned the local Ningbo dialect of Wu Chinese instead. She reportedly got along well with Mao Fumei and did her own housework.

=== As first lady ===
When Chiang Ching-kuo became president, Fang-liang rarely performed the traditional roles of first lady, partly due to her lack of formal education; her husband also encouraged her not to get into politics. She occasionally taught Russian to Kuomintang cadets. She largely stayed out of the public spotlight, and little was ever known of her in an anti-communist atmosphere in the government. She never returned to Russia and travelled abroad only three times in the last 50 years of her life, all to visit her children and their families. In 1992, she received a visit from a Belarusian delegation.

== Children ==
On 14 December 1935, their first son Chiang Hsiao-wen was born in the Soviet Union. Each of her three younger children was born in different parts of China, reflecting turbulent years as an official of the country. Faina had four children:

- Chiang Hsiao-wen (b. 1935 in Sverdlovsk);
- Chiang Hsiao-chang (b. 1938 in Nanchang);
- Chiang Hsiao-wu (b. 1945 in Chekiang);
- Chiang Hsiao-yung (b. 1948 in Shanghai).

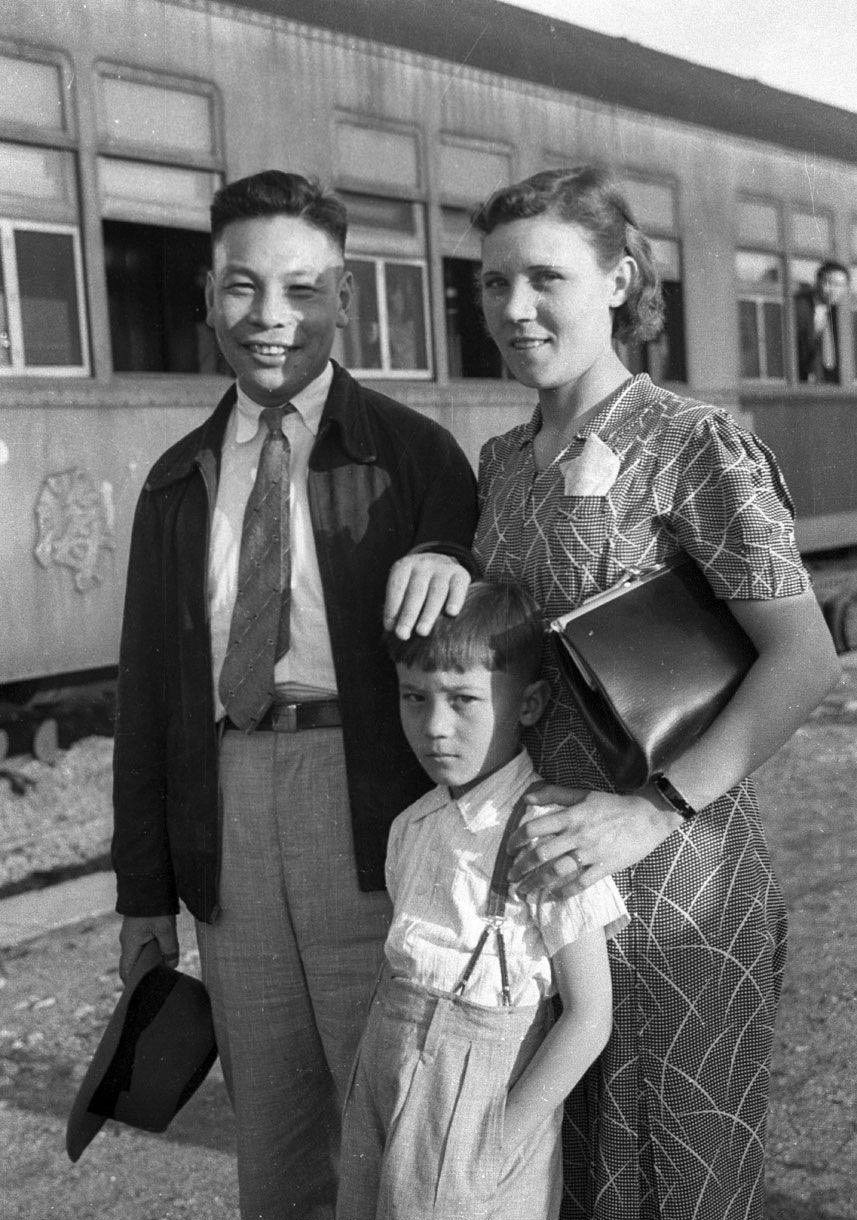
With Chiang Ching-kuo and Chiang Hsiao-wen in Gannan Prefecture, where Ching-kuo was serving as commissioner (c.1940s)

All her children were sent to study in foreign universities – Hsiao-wu to West Germany and the remaining children to the United States. All three sons died shortly after Ching-kuo's death in 1988: Hsiao-wen in 1989, Hsiao-wu in 1991, and Hsiao-yung in 1996. Fang-liang then lived in the suburbs of Taipei. She received occasional visitors, such as some prominent politicians who went to pay their respects every few years. In the Taiwanese media, if she ever received coverage, she was depicted as a virtuous wife who never complained and endured her loneliness with dignity.

=== Death and funeral ===
Chiang died of respiratory and cardiac failure stemming from lung cancer at the Taipei Veterans General Hospital on 15 December 2004, at the age of 88 (or 89 according to East Asian age reckoning).

Chiang's funeral was held on 27 December 2004, with President Chen Shui-bian and Vice President Annette Lu in attendance. Kuomintang politicians Wang Jin-pyng, Lin Cheng-chih, P. K. Chiang, and Ma Ying-jeou draped her casket with the Kuomintang party flag, and Kuomintang party elders Lee Huan, Hau Pei-tsun, Chiu Chuang-huan, and Shih Chi-yang draped her casket with the ROC national flag. Chiang was cremated and her ashes taken to her husband's temporary mausoleum in Touliao, Taoyuan County (now Taoyuan City). They were buried together in the Wuchih Mountain Military Cemetery.

Chiang family tree

Soong May‑ling 宋美齡	Mao Fumei 毛福梅	Chiang Kai‑shek 蔣介石	Yao Yecheng 姚冶誠	Chen Jieru 陳潔如
Faina Chiang Fang‑liang 蔣方良	Chiang Ching-kuo 蔣經國	Chang Ya‑juo 章亞若 (mistress)	Shih Chin‑i 石靜宜	Chiang Wei‑kuo 蔣緯國 (adopted)	Chiu Ju‑hsüeh 丘如雪	Chen Yao‑kuang 陳瑶光 (adopted)
Alan Chiang Hsiao‑wen 蔣孝文	Amy Chiang Hsiao‑chang 蔣孝章	Alex Chiang Hsiao‑wu 蔣孝武	Eddie Chiang Hsiao‑yung 蔣孝勇	Winston Chang Hsiao‑tzu 章孝慈	John Chiang Hsiao‑yen 蔣孝嚴	Chiang Hsiao‑kang 蔣孝剛
Nancy Xu Nai‑jin 徐乃錦	Yu Yang‑ho 俞揚和	Wang Zhang‑shi 汪長詩	Michelle Tsai Hui‑mei 蔡惠媚	Elizabeth Fang Chi‑yi 方智怡	Chao Chung‑te 趙申德	Helen Huang Mei‑lun 黃美倫	Wang Yi‑hui 王倚惠
Theodore Yu Tsu‑sheng 俞祖聲	Chang Ching‑sung 章勁松	Chang Yo‑chu 章友菊	Vivian Chiang Hui‑lan 蔣惠蘭	Chiang Hui‑yün 蔣惠筠	Chiang Wan-an 蔣萬安
Chiang Yo‑mei 蔣友梅	Alexandra Chiang Yo‑lan 蔣友蘭	Johnathan Chiang Yo‑sung 蔣友松	Demos Chiang Yo‑bo 蔣友柏	Edward Chiang Yo‑chang 蔣友常	Andrew Chiang Yo‑ching 蔣友青	Chiang Yo‑chüan 蔣友娟	Chiang Yo‑chieh 蔣友捷

Notes
- Dashed lines represent marriages
- Dotted lines represent extra-marital relationships and adoptions
- Solid lines represent descendants

== See also ==
- Cafe Astoria
- Franziska Donner
