= Winston Chang =

Taiwanese educator (1942–1996)

- 章孝慈

President of Soochow University
- In office 1992 – 24 February 1996

Personal details
- Born: March 1, 1942 Guilin, Guangxi, Republic of China
- Died: February 24, 1996 (aged 53) Taipei Veterans General Hospital, Taipei, Taiwan
- Party: Kuomintang
- Spouse: Chao Chung-te
- Relations: John Chiang (twin brother)
- Children: 2
- Parents: Disputed: Chiang Ching-kuo Guo Libo Wang Jichun (father); Chang Ya-juo (mother)
- Education: Soochow University (BA, LLB); Southern Methodist University (MA); Tulane University (LLM, JD)

Winston Hsiao-tzu Chang (Chinese: 章孝慈; pinyin: Zhāng Xiàocí; 1 March 1942 – 24 February 1996) was a Taiwanese legal scholar who served as the president of Soochow University in Taipei.

== Early life and education ==
He and his identical twin brother, John Chang, were born the sons of Chiang Ching-kuo and Chang Ya-juo maybe at what is now Second People's Hospital in Guilin. As they were born out of wedlock, they took their mother's surname (although both were given the generation name of Hsiao shared by all of Chiang Ching-kuo's children, (legitimate or otherwise). Chang Ya-juo died when the brothers were infants in August 1942, and they were raised by Chang Ya-juo's younger brother, Chang Hau-juo (章浩若) and his wife Chi Chen (紀琛). Their uncle and aunt were listed as their parents on official documents until December 2002.

The brothers fled to Hsinchu, Taiwan, in 1949 and both studied law at Soochow University, where Winston graduated with a bachelor's degree in Chinese language and literature and received his Bachelor of Laws (LL.B.) in 1971. He then completed graduate studies in the United States at Southern Methodist University, where he earned a Master of Arts (M.A.) in political science in 1974, and at Tulane University. Chang earned his Master of Laws (LL.B.) degree in 1975 and his Juris Doctor (J.D.) in 1978 from the Tulane University Law School.

== Career ==
After returning to Taiwan, he was mostly involved in teaching and research. He later became the chairman of the Soochow University College of Law as well as the president in 1992.

On 20 August 1993, Chang visited his mother's tomb in Guilin and attended a cross-straits Buddhist conference. In late 1994, Chang suffered a stroke (eventually causing his death) in Beijing and entered into a coma. He was flown back to Taiwan via Hong Kong in his comatose condition. Despite the fact that he never recovered from the coma, he continued to officially serve as president on medical leave until his death two years later.

With Chao Chung-te (趙申德), Chang had a son, Ching-sung (勁松), and a daughter, Yu-chu (友菊).

== Family tree ==
Chiang family tree

Soong May‑ling 宋美齡 | Mao Fumei 毛福梅 | Chiang Kai‑shek 蔣介石 | Yao Yecheng 姚冶誠 | Chen Jieru 陳潔如
Faina Chiang Fang‑liang 蔣方良 | Chiang Ching-kuo 蔣經國 | Chang Ya‑juo 章亞若 (mistress) | Shih Chin‑i 石靜宜 | Chiang Wei‑kuo 蔣緯國 (adopted) | Chiu Ju‑hsüeh 丘如雪 | Chen Yao‑kuang 陳瑶光 (adopted)
Alan Chiang Hsiao‑wen 蔣孝文 | Amy Chiang Hsiao‑chang 蔣孝章 | Alex Chiang Hsiao‑wu 蔣孝武 | Eddie Chiang Hsiao‑yung 蔣孝勇 | Winston Chang Hsiao‑tzu 章孝慈 | John Chiang Hsiao‑yen 蔣孝嚴 | Chiang Hsiao‑kang 蔣孝剛
Nancy Xu Nai‑jin 徐乃錦 | Yu Yang‑ho 俞揚和 | Wang Zhang‑shi 汪長詩 | Michelle Tsai Hui‑mei 蔡惠媚 | Elizabeth Fang Chi‑yi 方智怡 | Chao Chung‑te 趙申德 | Helen Huang Mei‑lun 黃美倫 | Wang Yi‑hui 王倚惠
Theodore Yu Tsu‑sheng 俞祖聲 | Chang Ching‑sung 章勁松 | Chang Yo‑chu 章友菊 | Vivian Chiang Hui‑lan 蔣惠蘭 | Chiang Hui‑yün 蔣惠筠 | Chiang Wan-an 蔣萬安
Chiang Yo‑mei 蔣友梅 | Alexandra Chiang Yo‑lan 蔣友蘭 | Johnathan Chiang Yo‑sung 蔣友松 | Demos Chiang Yo‑bo 蔣友柏 | Edward Chiang Yo‑chang 蔣友常 | Andrew Chiang Yo‑ching 蔣友青 | Chiang Yo‑chüan 蔣友娟 | Chiang Yo‑chieh 蔣友捷

Notes
- Dashed lines represent marriages
- Dotted lines represent extra-marital relationships and adoptions
- Solid lines represent descendants
