= Chiang Hsiao-yen =

Taiwanese politician (born 1942)

- 蔣孝嚴
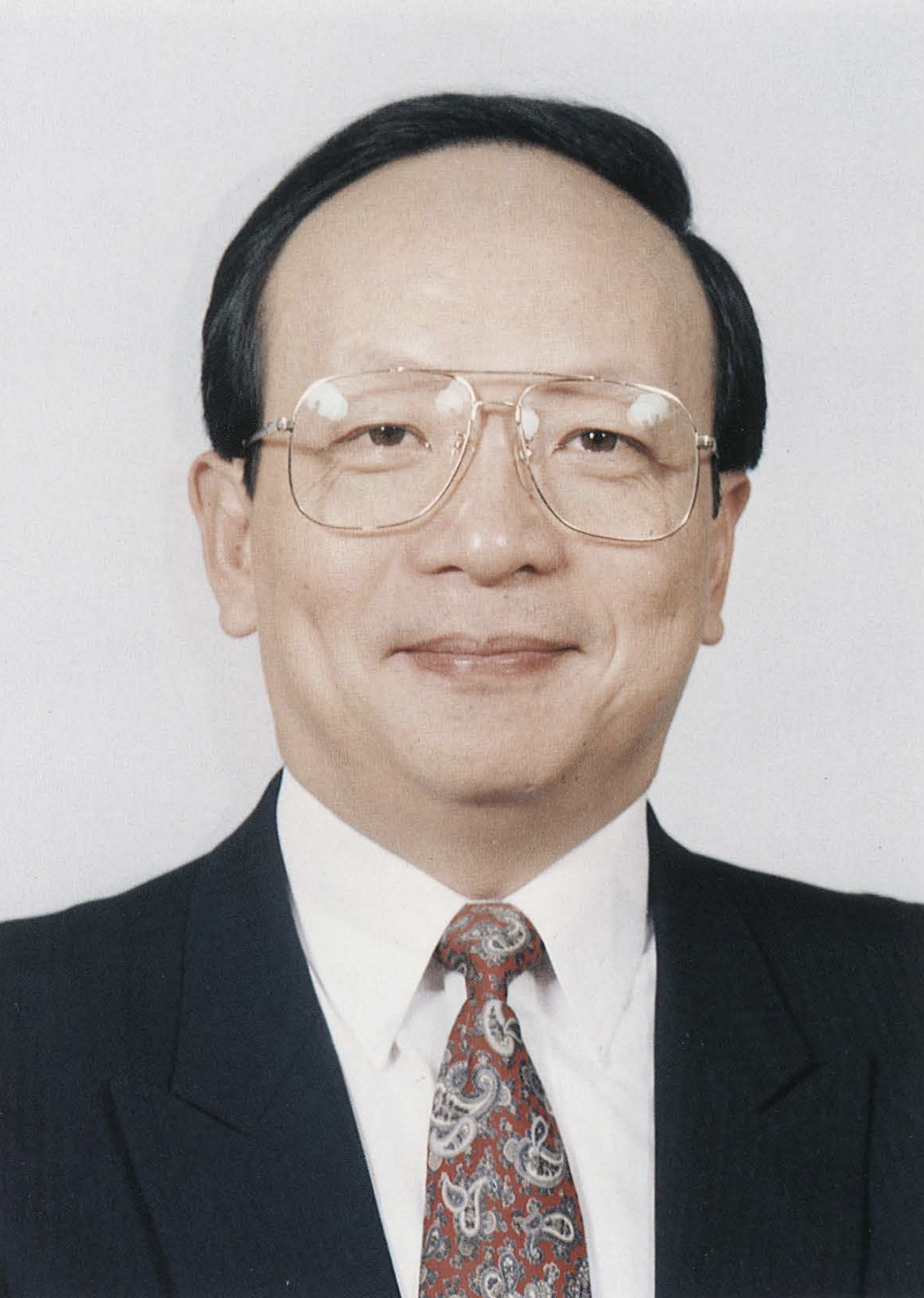
- Official portrait, 1985

Vice Chairman of the Kuomintang
- In office 22 November 2008 – 30 April 2014
- Chairman: Wu Po-hsiung; Ma Ying-jeou

Member of the Legislative Yuan
- In office 1 February 2002 – 31 January 2012
- Succeeded by: Lo Shu-lei (TPI 3rd)
- Constituency: Taipei; Taipei 3rd

12th Secretary-General of the Kuomintang
- In office 11 December 1997 – 18 November 1999
- Chairman: Lee Teng-hui
- Preceded by: Wu Po-hsiung
- Succeeded by: Huang Kun-huei

16th Secretary-General to the President
- In office 18 November 1999 – 22 December 1999
- President: Lee Teng-hui
- Preceded by: Huang Kun-huei
- Succeeded by: Ting Mao-shih

18th Vice Premier of the Republic of China
- In office 1 September 1997 – 11 December 1997
- Prime Minister: Vincent Siew
- Preceded by: Hsu Li-teh
- Succeeded by: Liu Chao-shiuan

12th Minister of Foreign Affairs
- In office 10 June 1996 – 20 October 1997
- Prime Minister: Lien Chan; Vincent Siew
- Preceded by: Fredrick Chien
- Succeeded by: Jason Hu

Personal details
- Born: Chang Hsiao-yen; 1 March 1942 (age 84) Guilin, Guangxi, Republic of China
- Party: Kuomintang
- Spouse: Helen Huang
- Children: Chiang Hui-lan; Chiang Hui-yun; Chiang Wan-an
- Parents: Disputed: Chiang Ching-kuo Guo Libo Wang Jichun (father); Chang Ya-juo (mother)
- Education: Soochow University (BS); Georgetown University (MS)

Chiang Hsiao-yen
- Traditional Chinese: 蔣孝嚴
- Simplified Chinese: 蒋孝严
Transcriptions
Standard Mandarin
- Hanyu Pinyin: Jiǎng Xiaòyán
- Wade–Giles: Chiang³ Hsiao⁴-yen²

Original Name
- Traditional Chinese: 章孝嚴
- Simplified Chinese: 章孝严
Transcriptions
Standard Mandarin
- Hanyu Pinyin: Zhāng Xiaòyán
- Wade–Giles: Chang¹ Hsiao⁴-yen²

Chiang Hsiao-yen (Chinese: 蔣孝嚴; pinyin: Jiǎng Xiàoyán; Wade–Giles: Chiang^{3} Hsiao^{4}-yen^{2}; born 1 March 1942), also known by his English name John Chiang, formerly surnamed Chang (章; Zhāng), is a Taiwanese politician affiliated with the Kuomintang. He is the speculated illegitimate son of Chiang Ching-kuo, former leader of the Republic of China, which would make him the grandson of Chiang Kai-shek.

== Early life and education ==
He and his identical twin brother, Winston Chang, both illegitimate, are believed to have been born the sons of Chiang Ching-kuo and his mistress Chang Ya-juo at the Second People's Hospital of Guilian, a public hospital in Guilin. Since they were born out of wedlock, the twins took their mother's surname, Chang, though they were given the Chiang generation name (孝; Xiào; Hsiaò) shared by all the grandchildren of Chiang Kai-shek, including Chiang Ching-kuo's legitimate children.

Chang Ya-juo died when the brothers were one year old in August 1942, and they were raised by Chang Ya-juo's younger brother, Chang Hau-juo (章浩若) and his wife Chi Chen (紀琛). Their uncle and aunt were listed as their natural parents on official documents until December 2002, when the true parents were listed. Chou Chin-hua (周錦華), the boys' maternal grandmother, and the 7-year-old brothers moved to Taiwan amid the Chinese Civil War. They were not informed that Chiang Ching-kuo was their father until they were in high school. The Chang brothers went to Soochow University at the same time. John later obtained an M.S. from Georgetown University.

With Helen H. Huang (黃美倫), he has two daughters, Hui-lan (惠蘭) and Hui-yun (惠筠), and a son, Wan-an (萬安). In March 2005, he officially changed his surname to "Chiang", saying, "The change represents a respect for history, a return to the facts, and a realization of my parents' wishes." He also announced that his children would follow suit.

== Political career ==
Chiang began his career in the foreign service, serving in the ROC embassy in Washington, D.C., from 1974 to 1977. In the 1980s, he held various administrative posts in the ROC Foreign Ministry specializing in North American Affairs. He was Administrative Vice Minister from 1986 to 1990, Director General, of the Overseas Affairs Department in 1990, and Political Vice Minister from 1990 to 1993. In 1993 he was appointed to the cabinet-level post of Chairman of the Overseas Chinese Affairs Commission and served as a member of the KMT Central Standing Committee. He was selected a member of the National Assembly in 1996.

He was Foreign Minister from 1996 to 1997, vice premier in 1997, and Secretary-General of the presidential office in 1999. He was speculated as a potential running mate for Lien Chan on the KMT ticket in the 2000 presidential elections until a sex scandal involving a mistress caused him to resign on 22 December 1999. His alleged mistress strenuously denied the allegations, filing suit against the newspaper which had named her.

Chang announced his candidacy for the December 2001 legislative elections in March 2001. One of his opponents in the December 2001 elections was his alleged 1999 mistress, but she received only a fraction of his eventual winning vote count. From 2002 through 2012, he was a member of the Legislative Yuan, first representing the constituency of Taipei City South from 2002 to 2005 and then representing Taipei City North from 2005 through 2012. He served as the Chairman of Interior Affairs Committee while in the legislature.

In January 2006, Chiang declared his candidacy as a KMT candidate for the Taipei Mayor, but withdrew from the race in April, stating he did so for party solidarity.

At the end of March 2007, Chiang staged a rally at the Chiang Kai-shek Memorial Hall in support of his grandfather, late President Chiang Kai-shek. The Memorial hall was later renamed, in a hotly controversial move, by the Executive Yuan, to the National Taiwan Democracy Memorial Hall, striking out the name of Chiang Kai-shek temporarily; the Memorial's name was restored on 21 August 2008.

In the 2008 Republic of China legislative election, John Chiang won re-election in his district of Taipei City North. In 2009, he met Kong Dongmei, the granddaughter of Chinese leader Mao Zedong, who was part of a delegation from China to promote cultural and educational ties between China and Taiwan. The meeting was then seen as a sign of the improvement of Cross-Strait relations.

In April 2011, Chiang lost a poll for the Kuomintang legislative candidacy to Lo Shu-lei, a fellow Kuomintang legislator, in the Taipei Zhongshan-Songshan electoral district by a margin of 0.58 percent. The poll was made binding for the KMT nomination and Lo Shu-lei was later elected to the Legislative Yuan.

In March 2015, Chiang's son Wan-an announced his candidacy for the Legislative Yuan in the KMT primary for Taipei's Zhongshan-Songshan district, which put him against Lo Shu-lei and Wang Hung-wei for the KMT nomination. Chiang Wan-an subsequently won the KMT primary in May 2015, quickly gaining name recognition thanks in part to his chats with prospective voters as they waited for garbage trucks. John Chiang's participation in his son's campaign was limited to moral support and babysitting his son's children.

== Family tree ==
Chiang family tree

Soong May‑ling 宋美齡	Mao Fumei 毛福梅	Chiang Kai‑shek 蔣介石	Yao Yecheng 姚冶誠	Chen Jieru 陳潔如
Faina Chiang Fang‑liang 蔣方良	Chiang Ching-kuo 蔣經國	Chang Ya‑juo 章亞若 (mistress)	Shih Chin‑i 石靜宜	Chiang Wei‑kuo 蔣緯國 (adopted)	Chiu Ju‑hsüeh 丘如雪	Chen Yao‑kuang 陳瑶光 (adopted)
Alan Chiang Hsiao‑wen 蔣孝文	Amy Chiang Hsiao‑chang 蔣孝章	Alex Chiang Hsiao‑wu 蔣孝武	Eddie Chiang Hsiao‑yung 蔣孝勇	Winston Chang Hsiao‑tzu 章孝慈	John Chiang Hsiao‑yen 蔣孝嚴	Chiang Hsiao‑kang 蔣孝剛
Nancy Xu Nai‑jin 徐乃錦	Yu Yang‑ho 俞揚和	Wang Zhang‑shi 汪長詩	Michelle Tsai Hui‑mei 蔡惠媚	Elizabeth Fang Chi‑yi 方智怡	Chao Chung‑te 趙申德	Helen Huang Mei‑lun 黃美倫	Wang Yi‑hui 王倚惠
Theodore Yu Tsu‑sheng 俞祖聲	Chang Ching‑sung 章勁松	Chang Yo‑chu 章友菊	Vivian Chiang Hui‑lan 蔣惠蘭	Chiang Hui‑yün 蔣惠筠	Chiang Wan-an 蔣萬安
Chiang Yo‑mei 蔣友梅	Alexandra Chiang Yo‑lan 蔣友蘭	Johnathan Chiang Yo‑sung 蔣友松	Demos Chiang Yo‑bo 蔣友柏	Edward Chiang Yo‑chang 蔣友常	Andrew Chiang Yo‑ching 蔣友青	Chiang Yo‑chüan 蔣友娟	Chiang Yo‑chieh 蔣友捷

Notes
- Dashed lines represent marriages
- Dotted lines represent extra-marital relationships and adoptions
- Solid lines represent descendants

Government offices
Preceded by Fredrick Chien	ROC Foreign Minister; 1996–1997	Succeeded by Jason C. Hu
