= Chiang Ching-kuo =

President of the Republic of China from 1978 to 1988

- 蔣經國
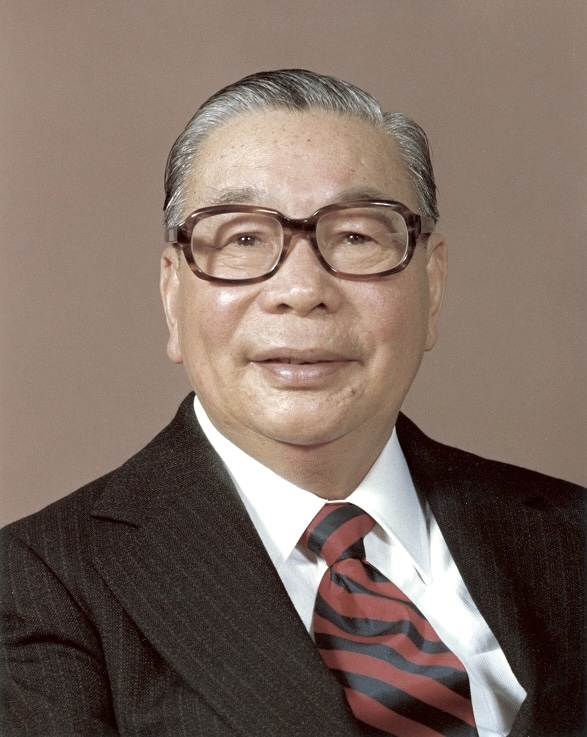
- Official portrait, 1985

3rd President of the Republic of China
- In office 20 May 1978 – 13 January 1988
- Premier: See list: Hsu Ching-chung (acting) Sun Yun-suan Yu Kuo-hwa
- Vice President: Hsieh Tung-min; Lee Teng-hui
- Preceded by: Yen Chia-kan
- Succeeded by: Lee Teng-hui

1st Chairman of the Kuomintang
- In office 5 April 1975 – 13 January 1988
- Preceded by: Chiang Kai-shek (Director-General of the Kuomintang)
- Succeeded by: Lee Teng-hui

9th Premier of the Republic of China
- In office 1 June 1972 – 20 May 1978
- President: Chiang Kai-shek; Yen Chia-kan
- Vice Premier: Hsu Ching-chung
- Preceded by: Yen Chia-kan
- Succeeded by: Hsu Ching-chung (acting)

11th Vice Premier of the Republic of China
- In office 1 July 1969 – 1 June 1972
- Premier: Yen Chia-kan
- Preceded by: Huang Shao-ku
- Succeeded by: Hsu Ching-chung

9th Minister of National Defense
- In office 14 January 1965 – 30 June 1969
- Premier: Yen Chia-kan
- Preceded by: Yu Da-wei
- Succeeded by: Huang Chieh

Minister without Portfolio
- In office 15 July 1958 – 13 January 1965
- Premier: Chen Cheng; Yen Chia-kan

2nd Minister of Vocational Assistance Commission for Retired Servicemen
- In office 25 April 1956 – 1 July 1964
- Premier: Yu Hung-chun; Chen Cheng; Yen Chia-kan
- Preceded by: Yen Chia-kan
- Succeeded by: Chau Chu-yue

Personal details
- Born: 27 April 1910 (Note: Many sources, even Taiwanese official ones, give 18 March 1910 as his birthday, but this actually refers to the lunisolar traditional Chinese calendar.) Fenghua, Zhejiang, China
- Died: 13 January 1988 (aged 77) Taipei, Taiwan
- Resting place: Touliao Mausoleum, Taoyuan, Taiwan
- Party: Kuomintang
- Other political affiliations: Communist Party of the Soviet Union
- Spouse: Faina Vakhreva (m. 1935)
- Children: Chiang Hsiao-wen; Chiang Hsiao-chang; Chiang Hsiao-yen (illegitimate, disputed); Winston Chang (illegitimate, disputed); Chiang Hsiao-wu; Chiang Hsiao-yung
- Parent(s): Chiang Kai-shek (father); Mao Fumei (mother)
- Education: Moscow Sun Yat-sen University

Military service
- Allegiance: Republic of China
- Branch: Republic of China Army
- Service years: 1937–1968
- Rank: General

Chiang Ching-kuo
- "Chiang Ching-kuo" in Traditional (top) and Simplified (bottom) Chinese characters
- Traditional Chinese: 蔣經國
- Simplified Chinese: 蒋经国
Transcriptions
Standard Mandarin
- Hanyu Pinyin: Jiǎng Jīngguó
- Wade–Giles: Chiang^{3} Ching^{1}-kuo^{2}
- IPA: [tɕjàŋ tɕíŋ.kwǒ]
Wu
- Wugniu: tsian^{3} cin^{1} koq^{7}
- IPA: Shanghainese: [tɕiã˧ tɕiŋ˦ koʔ˧]
Yue: Cantonese
- Yale Romanization: Jéung Gīng-gwok
- Jyutping: Zoeng^{2} Ging^{1}-gwok^{3}
- IPA: [tsœŋ˧˥ kɪŋ˥.kʷɔk̚˧]
Southern Min
- Hokkien POJ: Chiúⁿ Keng-kok
- Tâi-lô: Tsiúnn King-kok

Chiang Ching-kuo (/ˈtʃæŋtʃɪŋˈkwoʊ/, 27 April 1910 – 13 January 1988) was a Chinese and Taiwanese statesman and diplomat. He served as the president of the Republic of China from 1978 until his death in 1988, and acted as a de facto leader of the country by serving as Premier from 1972 to 1978. He was also the chairman of the ruling Kuomintang (KMT) party from 1975. During his presidency, Taiwan ended martial law and began political liberalization.

Chiang was born in Fenghwa, Chekiang as the eldest and only biological son of Chiang Kai-shek, the commander of National Revolutionary Army and KMT leader. He attended school in Shanghai and Beijing, where he became interested in socialism and communism. As a teenager in 1925, when the KMT and the Chinese Communist Party (CCP) were allied in the First United Front, he was sent to the Soviet Union (USSR) to attend university; he spoke Russian fluently. In 1927, due to the KMT's White Terror against the CCP, the Soviets sent Chiang to work in a steel factory in the Ural Mountains where he met and married Faina Vakhreva. In 1937, the Soviets returned the couple back to China shortly before the Second Sino-Japanese War. He entered the Nationalist government and served as the administrative commissioner of Gannan Prefecture in Jiangxi province from 1939 to 1945 during World War II. In 1948, Chiang went to Shanghai to enforce strict economic controls and fight inflation. He tried to freeze prices and force wealthy merchants to turn in Chinese gold yuan, but the campaign ultimately failed amid severe economic collapse. In 1949, he moved to Taiwan when the KMT lost the Chinese Civil War.

Chiang held successively powerful government posts on Taiwan. Initially he was director of Taiwan Garrison Command, the military secret police organization which used arbitrary arrests and torture to support the White Terror. He became Minister of Defense in 1965, vice-premier in 1969, premier in 1972, and then president for two terms starting in 1978 and 1984 respectively. He became KMT chairman after Chiang Kai-shek died in 1975. As president, the authoritarian state became more tolerant of political dissent, eventually relaxing restrictions to media and speech and permitting Democratic Progressive Party candidates to stand for election. Chiang increased the political representation and participation of local Taiwanese (benshengren) over post-World War II migrants from the mainland (waishengren) who had typically been favored; his successor, Lee Teng-hui, was benshengren. Chiang is credited with Soviet-inspired city planning policies, economic development with the Ten Major Construction Projects, anti-corruption efforts and Taiwan's democratic transition.

== Early life ==
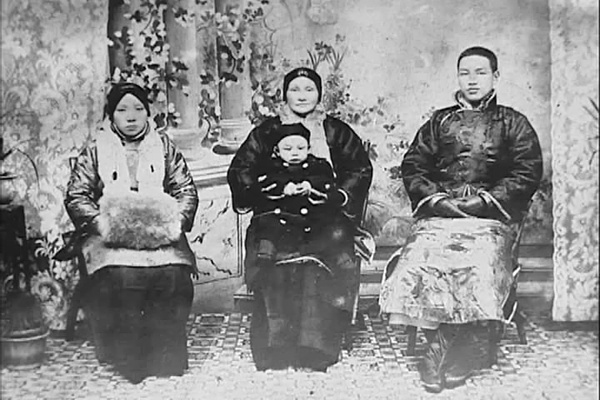
Chiang Ching-kuo in the arms of his grandmother Wang Caiyu (middle), with his mother Mao Fumei (left) and father Chiang Kai-shek (right), 1910

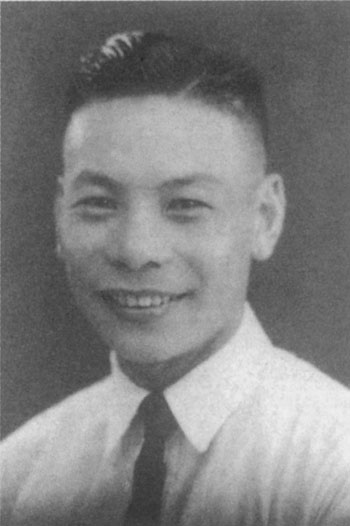
Chiang Ching-kuo in the 1920s

The son of Chiang Kai-shek and his first wife, Mao Fumei, Chiang Ching-kuo was born in Fenghua, Zhejiang, with the courtesy name Chien-feng. His relationship with his father was strict and often distant, and in letters Chiang Kai-shek sternly told his son to improve his Chinese calligraphy. As a youth, Chiang Ching-kuo was arrested several times for revolutionary activity.

In early 1925, Chiang entered Shanghai's Pudong College, but his father sent him to Beijing because of warlord fighting and student protests in Shanghai. In Beijing he attended a school run by his father's friend Wu Zhihui, where he began to see himself as a progressive revolutionary and became drawn to the idea of studying in Moscow. Li Dazhao and others in Beijing encouraged him to go. The Soviet Union had set up a school for Chinese students that became Moscow Sun Yat-sen University, and its students were selected by members of the Soviet Communist Party and the Kuomintang (KMT), with the participation of the Central Committee of the Chinese Communist Party (CCP). Chiang Kai-shek wrote in his diary on 1 October 1925 that he had decided to let his son study in the Soviet Union.

== Political career ==
=== Moscow ===
Chiang arrived in Moscow in late November 1925, aged 15, with 21 other Chinese students, including Liao Chengzhi. The university president Karl Radek met the group at the station, and Chiang was given the Russian name Nikolai Vladimirovich Elizarov (Николай Владимирович Елизаров). He was placed in the same study group as Deng Xiaoping, the future leader of the CCP. About a month after his arrival, Chiang joined the Communist Youth League. He studied the works of Leon Trotsky in a secret study circle and later admitted that his views had matched Trotsky's, though he played this down after returning to China.

Chiang graduated from Sun Yat-sen University in 1927. After his father broke with the Communists that year, Chiang Ching-kuo publicly denounced his father's action and was selected for the Central Tolmachev Military and Political Institute in Leningrad, from which he graduated. The Communist Wang Ming accused him of organizing a counter-revolutionary "Zhejiang association", and the university held a three-day meeting to purge its alleged members. In autumn 1931, after Chiang criticized Wang Ming at a university meeting, the Soviet authorities removed him from his post in the Chinese student delegation and sent him to a village near Moscow. His repeated requests to return to China were refused, and he became the Chinese student who stayed longest in the Soviet Union.

Chiang went on to work as an apprentice at a Moscow electrical plant, a laborer at a gold mine in the Urals, and a technician and assistant director at the Ural Heavy Machinery Plant (Uralmash), and he edited the newspaper Heavy Industry Daily. At the plant he met Faina Ipat'evna Vakhreva in 1933, and they married in March 1935. She later took the Chinese name Chiang Fang-liang. In 1936 Chiang denounced his father again, though he later said he had been forced to do so and to remain in the Soviet Union.

Chiang Kai-shek refused to negotiate a prisoner exchange in which his son would be released in return for a CCP leader. He wrote in his diary, "It is not worth it to sacrifice the interest of the country for the sake of my son." In 1937 he wrote that he "would rather have no offspring than sacrifice our nation's interests". The writers Jung Chang and Jon Halliday have argued that Chiang Kai-shek allowed the Communists to escape on the Long March of 1934–1935 in the hope that Joseph Stalin would return his son, and that Chiang Ching-kuo had been "kidnapped". Chiang Kai-shek's diary, however, records his own decision to send his son to Moscow.

=== Return to China and the Second Sino-Japanese War ===
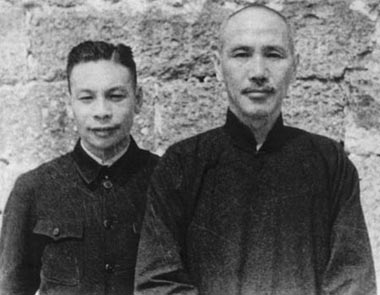
Chiang Ching-kuo with his father in the 1940s

Stalin allowed Chiang to return to China in 1937 with his Belarusian wife and their son Hsiao-wen. His father had by then formed a new united front with the CCP, and Chiang arrived in Shanghai on 25 March 1937.

During the war with Japan, Chiang held a series of military and administrative posts, and after 1941 his father increasingly relied on his advice. Before he turned 30, he became administrative inspector and security commander of the Fourth District of Jiangxi, centered on Gannan. There he proposed a "New Gannan" campaign, under which local officials promoted education and worked to eliminate opium, gambling, prostitution and banditry. He left Gannan in early 1944 to become education director of the Central Cadre School in Chongqing. In the late 1930s he met Wang Sheng, who remained close to him for the next 50 years.

The paramilitary Sanmin Zhuyi Youth Corps was under Chiang's control. He used the term "big bourgeoisie" disparagingly to describe H. H. Kung and T. V. Soong. Chiang was a member of the delegation led by Soong that arrived in Moscow on 30 June 1945 to negotiate a treaty of alliance with the Soviet Union. On 30 December 1945, he flew to Moscow again as his father's personal envoy and held talks with Stalin that night and on 3 January 1946.

While in mainland China, Chiang and his wife had a daughter, Hsiao-chang, born in Nanchang in 1938, and two more sons, Hsiao-wu, born in Chongqing in 1945, and Hsiao-yung, born in Shanghai in 1948.

=== Shanghai currency reform ===
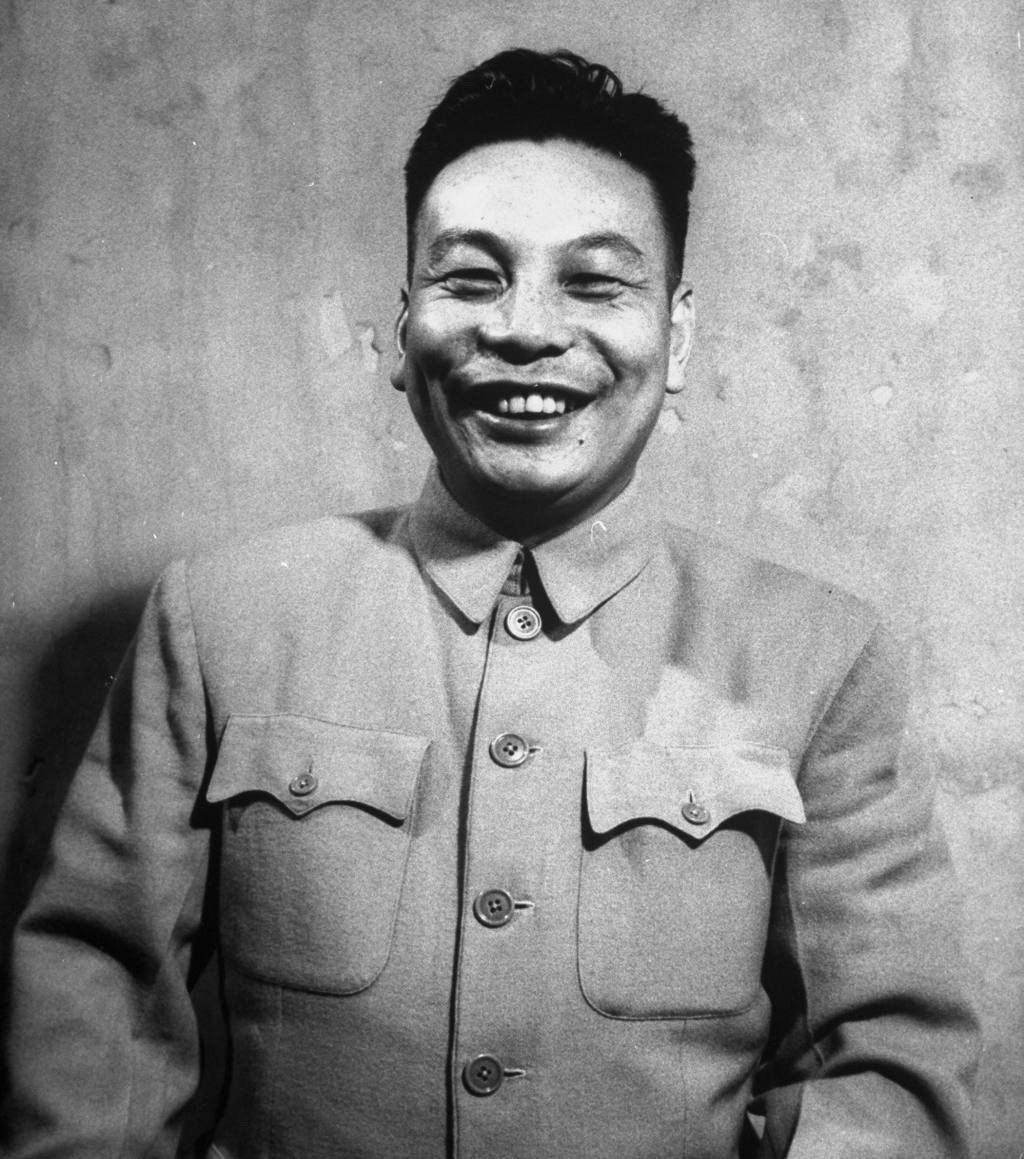
Chiang Ching-kuo in 1948

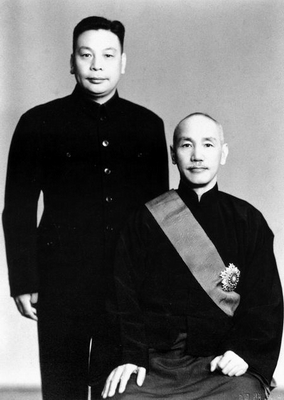
Chiang Ching-kuo (left) with his father in 1948

During the Chinese Civil War, the Nationalist government announced the gold yuan currency reform on 19 August 1948. Chiang was sent to Shanghai as an assistant to Yu Hung-chun and was put at the forefront of pressing those who resisted to hand over their funds. The historian Wu Jingping has said that Chiang had no real voice in designing the reform. The biographer Jonathan Fenby writes that Chiang copied methods he had learned in the Soviet Union, attacking middle-class merchants and enforcing low prices on all goods to win support from the working class.

Chiang used his own agents to make arrests in Shanghai rather than the city police. He relied on two relatively new organizations that answered directly to him. He used the Sixth Battalion of the Bandit-Suppression National-Reconstruction Corps to search warehouses for hoarded goods and to place secret report boxes around the city where people could anonymously report violators. He also used the Shanghai Youth Service Corps for enforcement.

Chiang had H. H. Kung's son David Kung and several employees of Kung's Yangtze Development Corporation arrested on allegations of holding foreign exchange. Soong Mei-ling complained to Chiang Kai-shek and also called Chiang Ching-kuo directly. David Kung was freed after negotiations, and Chiang Ching-kuo resigned. Wu Jingping argues that Chiang's failure to deal with the Yangtze company was not directly tied to the reform's collapse, which he attributes to rules that were unreasonable and hard to enforce, and to prices that quickly ran out of control. Wu described the campaign as a farce, though a tragedy for Chiang personally. According to the historian Parks M. Coble, its main effect was the flight of prominent capitalists from Shanghai to Hong Kong and elsewhere.

=== Political career in Taiwan ===
After the Communists took control of mainland China in 1949, Chiang and his father moved to Taiwan, where they re-established the government of the Republic of China. From late 1949, Chiang took charge of security, intelligence and military affairs. In March 1950 he became director of the General Political Department of the Ministry of National Defense. Chiang reorganized the military along Soviet lines, rebuilding the political officer corps and extending surveillance and KMT party activity throughout the armed forces. General Sun Li-jen, a graduate of the American Virginia Military Institute, opposed these changes. The China Youth Corps was established under Chiang's direction in October 1952, with Chiang as its first head.

Wu Kuo-chen, the governor of Taiwan and a rival of the Chiang family, was forced out of his post by Chiang Ching-kuo and left for the United States in 1953. Chiang orchestrated the controversial arrest of General Sun in August 1955, on allegations that Sun had plotted a coup with the American Central Intelligence Agency against Chiang Kai-shek. Chiang Kai-shek placed Sun under house arrest. His detention continued after Chiang Ching-kuo became president, and he was released on the orders of President Lee Teng-hui a few months after Chiang Ching-kuo's death. The Control Yuan cleared Sun in 2001. The historian John W. Garver writes that Chiang also approved the arbitrary arrest and torture of prisoners.

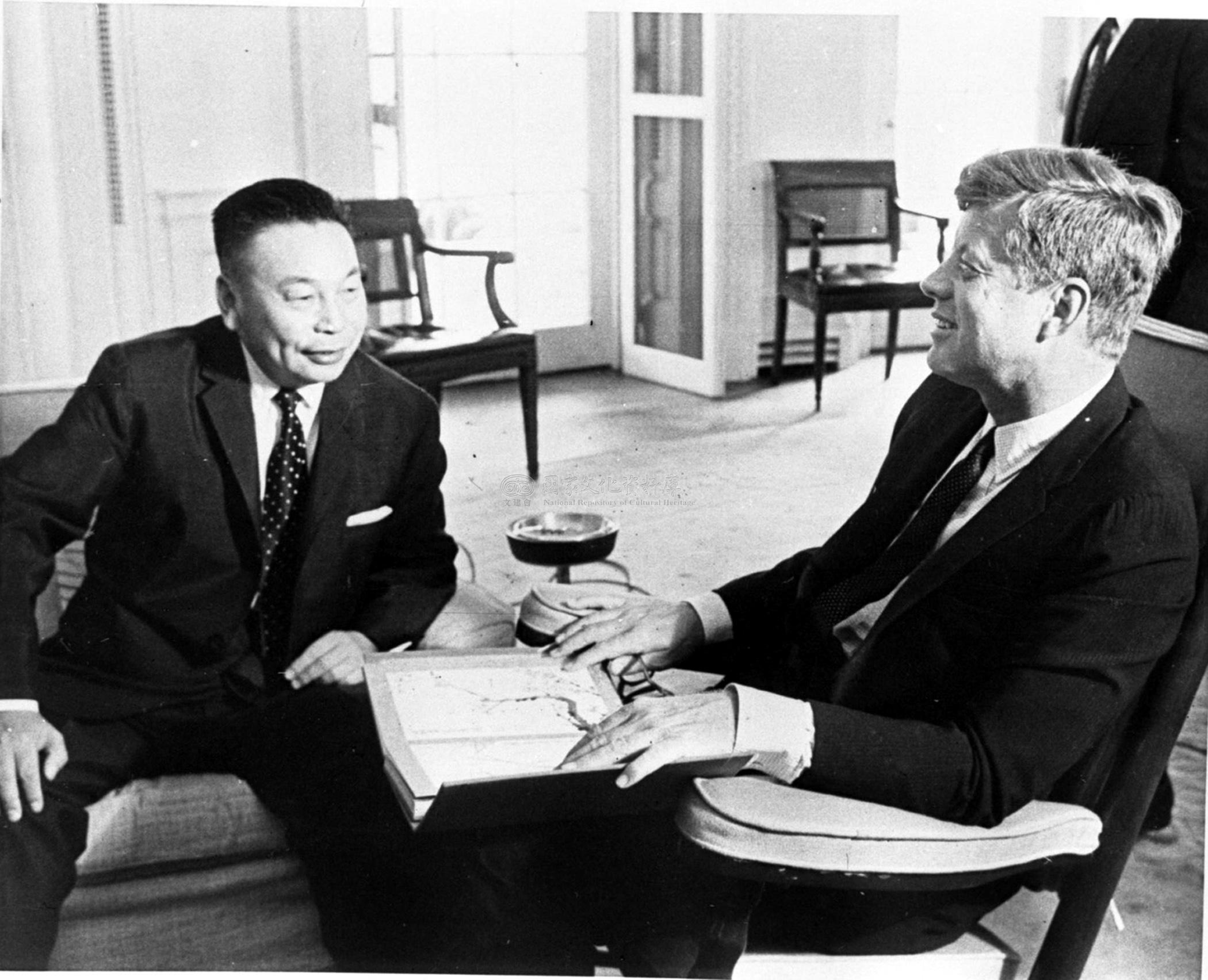
General Chiang Ching-kuo with U.S. President John F. Kennedy at the White House, 11 September 1963

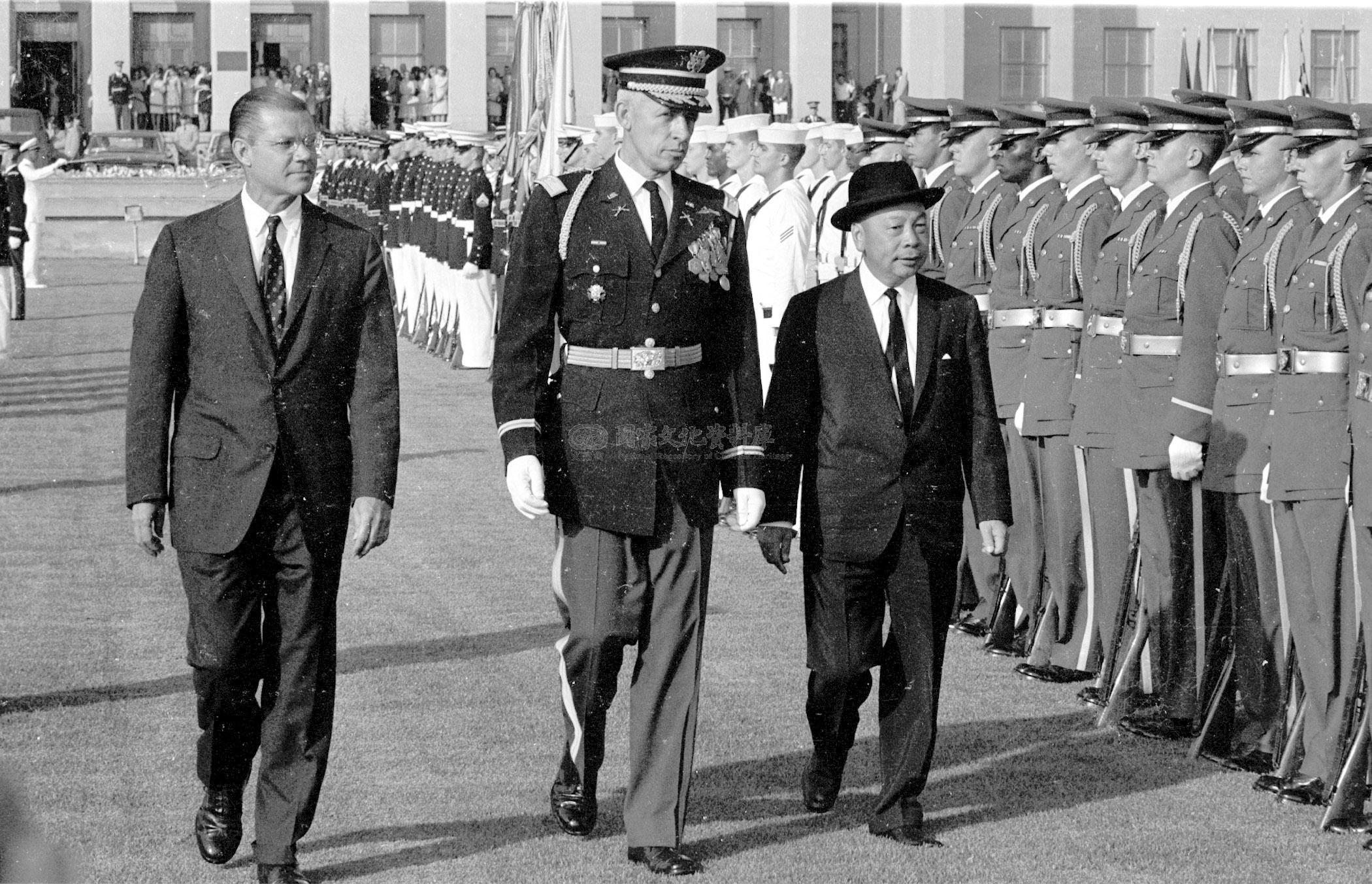
Defense Minister Chiang Ching-kuo at the Pentagon with U.S. Defense Secretary Robert McNamara, 23 September 1965

In 1956 Chiang became head of the Executive Yuan's Veterans Affairs Commission. He was promoted to minister of national defense in January 1965, became vice premier in 1969, and was appointed premier in 1972. In 1970 he was the target of an assassination attempt in New York City by Peter Huang.

As premier, Chiang organized a people's diplomacy campaign in the United States to mobilize American opposition to the People's Republic of China (PRC) through mass demonstrations and petitions. As part of these efforts, the KMT worked with the John Birch Society on a letter-writing campaign that urged Americans to ask their local officials to "Cut the Red China connection".

When Chiang Kai-shek died in April 1975, Vice President Yen Chia-kan completed his term as president, while Chiang Ching-kuo became leader of the KMT.

=== Presidency ===
The National Assembly elected Chiang president on 21 March 1978 for a six-year term, and he was sworn in on 20 May. He was re-elected in 1984 with Lee Teng-hui as his running mate. During his father's illness from 1973 to 1975 and after 1978, he worked to reduce corruption and favoritism and to bring more native-born Taiwanese into the legislative and executive branches, which had been dominated by officials from the mainland. He jailed some senior officials, including relatives, in an anticorruption campaign, imposed austerity, and introduced rules to make government more transparent.

Chiang is credited with the Ten Major Construction Projects. The writer Wu Feng-shan states that Taiwan's GDP grew nearly 16-fold during Chiang's 17 years as premier and president. Chiang also reformed labor rights in the 1970s and 1980s, covering child labor, women's employment, working hours, pensions, paid leave and employment contracts, through laws including the 1974 Labor Safety and Hygiene Law and the 1975 Factory Law. The average salary of Taiwanese workers tripled under his rule. Anti-strike laws and union-busting practices were relaxed, strengthening workers' bargaining power as martial law provisions were lifted.

After the United States ended formal diplomatic relations with the ROC in December 1978, Chiang kept Taiwan from overreacting and supported the Taiwan Relations Act, which preserved unofficial ties. He sought to protect Taiwan's foreign trade and political independence as many countries switched recognition to the PRC. He also adopted the Three Noes policy of no contact, no negotiation and no compromise with the CCP. In October 1981, the CCP leader Hu Yaobang publicly invited Chiang and other Taiwanese leaders to visit the mainland, an overture that Taipei rejected as a political maneuver aimed at eventual Communist rule over Taiwan. Chiang also rejected Deng Xiaoping's 1982 proposal of "one country, two systems", arguing that it would reduce the Republic of China to a local government. In the 1980s he opposed both recognizing the Communist government and negotiating reunification with the mainland.

After the August 1982 US–PRC joint communiqué, in which Washington agreed to gradually reduce arms sales to Taiwan, the administration of US President Ronald Reagan privately assured Chiang that it had not set a date to end arms sales, would not consult Beijing in advance on arms sales, and would not pressure Taipei to negotiate with the PRC, commitments known as the Six Assurances. Chiang also pursued a policy of military self-reliance to reduce Taiwan's dependence on the United States. As part of this effort, he launched the Indigenous Defense Fighter program, whose first aircraft was completed in 1988. Relations were strained after Taiwanese military intelligence operatives arranged the October 1984 murder of the Taiwanese-American dissident journalist Henry Liu in the garage of his home in California.

Chiang had a close personal friendship and political alliance with the Singapore prime minister Lee Kuan Yew, which laid the foundation for close cooperation between the two countries. Under an agreement codenamed Project Starlight, the Singapore Armed Forces trained troops and held military exercises in Taiwan, and Lee occasionally acted as a discreet go-between for mainland China and Taiwan.

In February 1985, Cathay Group, one of Taiwan's largest private conglomerates, and the Tenth Credit Cooperative, a major savings and loan institution, collapsed after violations of financial regulations, illegal self-dealing and unauthorized deposit collection. The failure caused panic and runs on local credit cooperatives, led to the resignations of senior officials, and weakened Chiang's political authority.

=== Political liberalization and succession ===
On 10 December 1979, a pro-democracy rally in Kaohsiung organized by the Tangwai opposition's Formosa Magazine turned violent after troops and police surrounded the protesters, in what became known as the Kaohsiung Incident. Opposition leaders including Annette Lu, Chen Chu and Lin Yi-hsiung were tried for sedition by a military court and received sentences ranging from 12 years to life imprisonment. Chiang later negotiated with the opposition, which led to Taiwan's first competitive national elections in 1980, and he oversaw the legislative election of 1983. When the Democratic Progressive Party (DPP) was founded on 28 September 1986, Chiang decided against dissolving the party or persecuting its leaders. That year saw Taiwan's first two-party election.

On 15 July 1987, Chiang ended martial law, which had been in force for 39 years. Military trials of civilians were abolished, but new national security laws kept bans on gatherings that promoted communism or independence. In the same year he ended the ban on travel to mainland China, opening personal and economic contact across the Taiwan Strait for the first time since 1949. The ban on new newspapers, in force since 1952, ended on 1 January 1988, and the number of newspapers rose from 31 to 126 by the end of that year. As premier in 1974, Chiang had defended the press environment by citing Taiwan's 31 newspapers and more than 1,900 publishing houses.

As premier, Chiang had recruited the agricultural economist Lee Teng-hui, who left academia, joined the KMT and became a minister without portfolio at the age of 49. Within a decade, Lee rose to become Mayor of Taipei and governor of Taiwan Province. Lee had built a reputation as an effective technocrat, and he had no power base of his own within the KMT. Chiang placed Lee and other Taiwanese in important positions in the party and government. In November 1983, he sidelined Wang Sheng, the head of the General Political Warfare Department, by sending him to Paraguay as ambassador. Lee became vice president in May 1984, which placed him first in line to succeed Chiang.

None of Chiang's three sons was considered a suitable successor, because of lack of interest, scandals and poor health. On 25 December 1985, Constitution Day in Taiwan, Chiang said that no member of his family would be a candidate in the next presidential election. In February 1990, after a group of National Assembly members proposed Lin Yang-kang for president, Chiang's brother Chiang Wei-kuo denied that Chiang had said members of the family could not run for president.

== Death ==
Chiang Ching-kuo lying in state

Chiang died of a heart attack at Taipei Veterans General Hospital on 13 January 1988, aged 77. The Office of the President records the time of death as 3:50 pm. He had used a wheelchair in the last months of his life and had diabetes, as well as problems with his eyesight and heart. Lee Teng-hui succeeded him as president under the constitution and became acting chairman of the KMT. Mainland-born party elders distrusted Lee, but he was elected party chairman at the KMT's 13th Congress in July 1988.

== Diaries ==
Chiang kept a diary from 1937 until 31 December 1979. The entries for 1937 to 1940 and 1945 to 1949 survive as transcripts, the diary for 1948 is lost, and the rest are handwritten originals. The diaries were deposited at Stanford University's Hoover Institution at the end of 2004 by Chiang's daughter-in-law Chiang Fang Chih-yi. Hoover opened copies of the diaries to researchers on 3 February 2020. Wu Feng-shan writes that the diaries show Chiang suffering from long-term insomnia, regarding the United States as an imperialist power, and living frugally. He also writes that the diaries ended because of Chiang's poor health and failing eyesight.

=== Legacy ===
Writing in Encyclopædia Britannica, the international studies scholar John F. Copper credits him with integrity and with democratizing Taiwan, launching a "political miracle" alongside its economic growth. Copper adds that polls into the 21st century found that most people regarded him as Taiwan's best president. In a 2019 Global Views poll, 38.7 percent of respondents named Chiang as the president who had contributed most to Taiwan, and a 2020 poll gave him a rating of 84.8 out of 100.

Wu Feng-shan acknowledges that Chiang was harsh toward political rivals and critics, and that many who suffered in his era still resent him, but judges that he did more good than harm. A 2022 editorial published in the Taipei Times credited Chiang with the Ten Major Construction Projects, localization, and the lifting of martial law and of the bans on new newspapers and political parties. The editorial also cited his role in the White Terror of the 1950s and 1960s, the Kaohsiung Incident and the murder of Henry Liu, and argued that his late reforms came mainly in response to pressure from Taiwanese citizens, the United States and diplomatic setbacks.

== Memorials ==
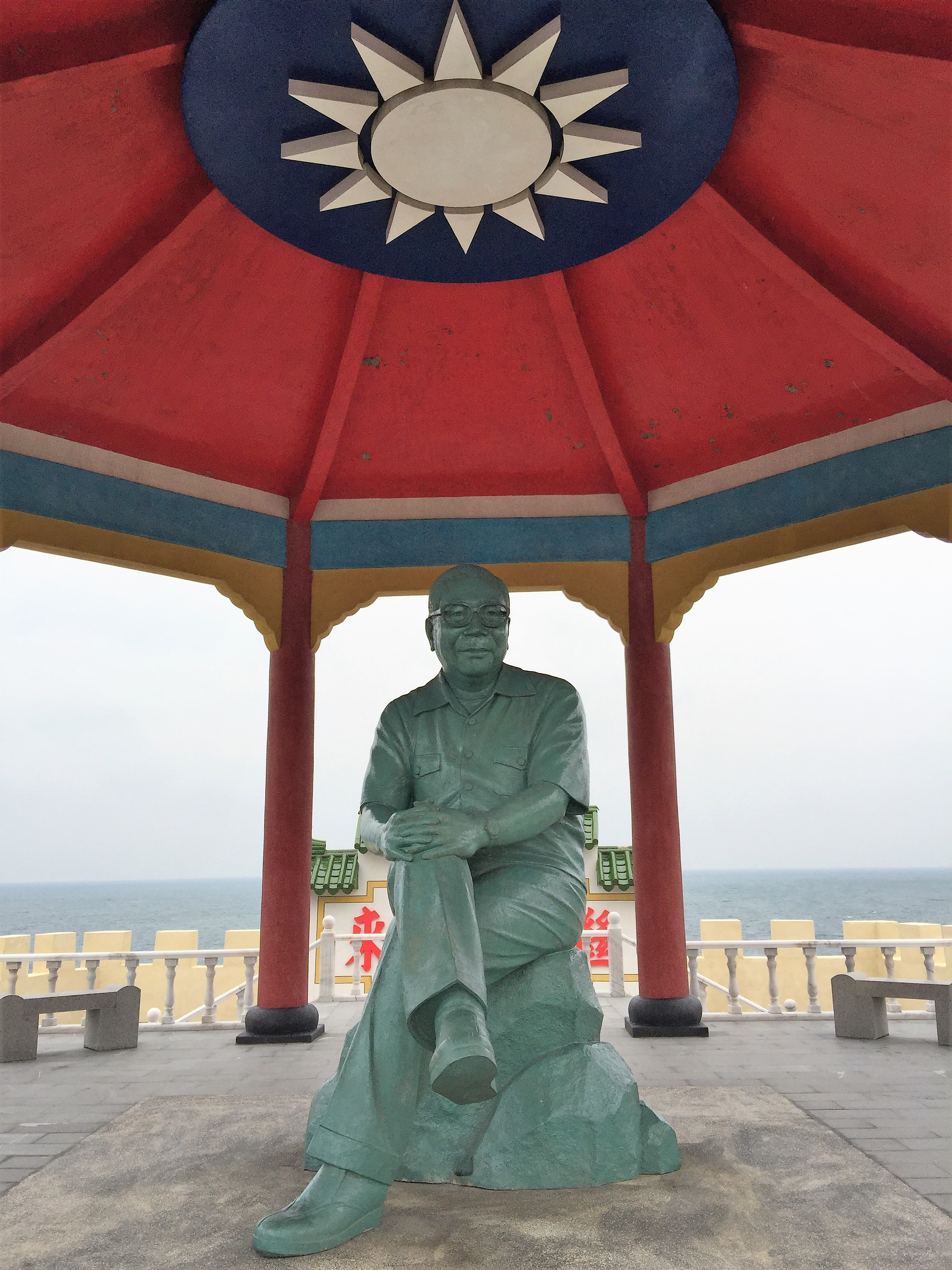
Statue of Chiang Ching-kuo in Dongyin Township, Lienchiang County

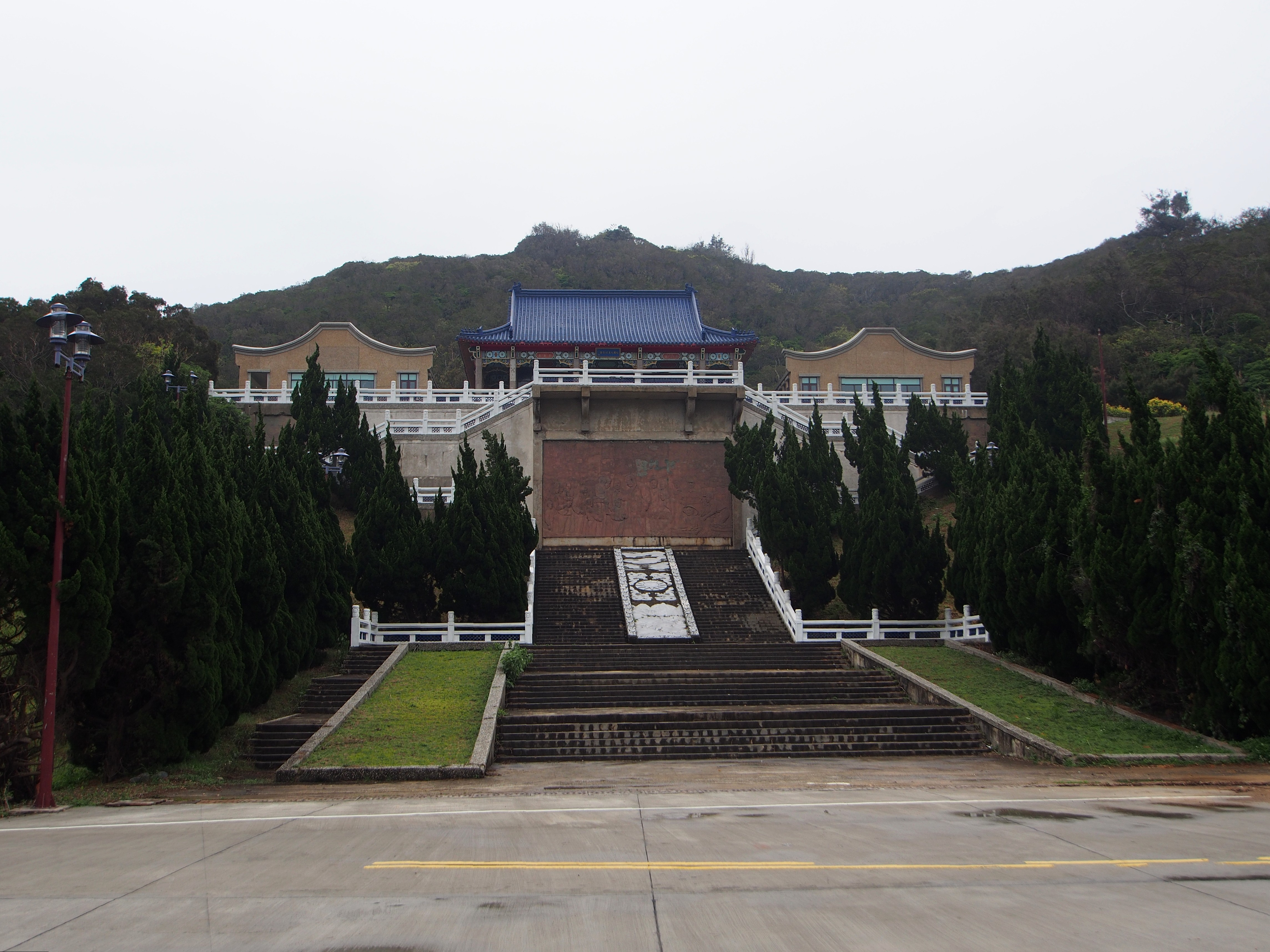
Ching-kuo Memorial Hall in Nangan Township, Lienchiang County

In March 2016, the Presidential Office under Ma Ying-jeou announced plans to name an auditorium "Ching-kuo Hall" in honor of Chiang's work with young people. The New Power Party legislator Freddy Lim said it was inappropriate to use public buildings to deify Chiang, and his colleague Hsu Yung-ming said the plan was politically motivated and would set back transitional justice.

The Ching-kuo Chi-hai Cultural Park, which includes the Chiang Ching-kuo Presidential Library, opened in Taipei's Dazhi area on 22 January 2022. It was built and is run jointly by the Chiang Ching-kuo Foundation for International Scholarly Exchange and the Taipei City Government. A day before the opening, the Transitional Justice Commission said that the park glorified authoritarianism and did not address Chiang's role in the White Terror. Speaking at the opening, President Tsai Ing-wen said that Chiang's defense of Taiwan united much of society and that the library would help people form a fair judgment of him.

== Family ==
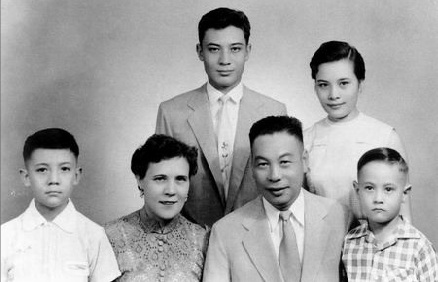
Chiang Ching-kuo's family. Front, from left: Alex (Hsiao-wu), Faina, Chiang Ching-kuo and Eddie (Hsiao-yung). Rear: Alan (Hsiao-wen) and Hsiao-chang.

Chiang married Faina Vakhreva, later known as Chiang Fang-liang, in 1935. They had three sons, Hsiao-wen, Hsiao-wu and Hsiao-yung, and a daughter, Hsiao-chang. He was also reported to be the father of Chang Ya-juo's twin sons, Chang Hsiao-tzu and Chang Hsiao-yen, although his 1954 diary entry denied this.

=== Relationship with Chang Ya-juo ===
Chiang met Chang Ya-juo when she was working at a training camp for enlistees and he was head of Gannan. The two had a relationship, and Chang gave birth to twin sons, Chang Hsiao-tzu and Chang Hsiao-yen, in 1942. In August 1942, Chang fell ill at a dinner party and died the next day in a hospital in Guilin. The circumstances of her death led to speculation that she had been murdered, and some of her relatives, including her sons, and former security officers said that the KMT security apparatus arranged her death to protect Chiang's career.

Chiang never spoke publicly about the twins. In a diary entry of 30 October 1954, he wrote that the twins' father was his late friend Wang Chi-chun, that he had acted as guarantor at the hospital, and that he supported the boys out of friendship for Wang. In a 2020 book on the diaries, the author Huang Ching-lung questioned this entry. He pointed to a 1942 entry in which Chiang was overjoyed at news of the twins' birth, and noted that the diary pages for 9 to 20 August 1942 are missing. Soong Mei-ling said that Chiang had denied being the father when she asked him.

=== Family tree ===
Chiang family tree

Soong May‑ling 宋美齡	Mao Fumei 毛福梅	Chiang Kai‑shek 蔣介石	Yao Yecheng 姚冶誠	Chen Jieru 陳潔如
Faina Chiang Fang‑liang 蔣方良	Chiang Ching-kuo 蔣經國	Chang Ya‑juo 章亞若 (mistress)	Shih Chin‑i 石靜宜	Chiang Wei‑kuo 蔣緯國 (adopted)	Chiu Ju‑hsüeh 丘如雪	Chen Yao‑kuang 陳瑶光 (adopted)
Alan Chiang Hsiao‑wen 蔣孝文	Amy Chiang Hsiao‑chang 蔣孝章	Alex Chiang Hsiao‑wu 蔣孝武	Eddie Chiang Hsiao‑yung 蔣孝勇	Winston Chang Hsiao‑tzu 章孝慈	John Chiang Hsiao‑yen 蔣孝嚴	Chiang Hsiao‑kang 蔣孝剛
Nancy Xu Nai‑jin 徐乃錦	Yu Yang‑ho 俞揚和	Wang Zhang‑shi 汪長詩	Michelle Tsai Hui‑mei 蔡惠媚	Elizabeth Fang Chi‑yi 方智怡	Chao Chung‑te 趙申德	Helen Huang Mei‑lun 黃美倫	Wang Yi‑hui 王倚惠
Theodore Yu Tsu‑sheng 俞祖聲	Chang Ching‑sung 章勁松	Chang Yo‑chu 章友菊	Vivian Chiang Hui‑lan 蔣惠蘭	Chiang Hui‑yün 蔣惠筠	Chiang Wan-an 蔣萬安
Chiang Yo‑mei 蔣友梅	Alexandra Chiang Yo‑lan 蔣友蘭	Johnathan Chiang Yo‑sung 蔣友松	Demos Chiang Yo‑bo 蔣友柏	Edward Chiang Yo‑chang 蔣友常	Andrew Chiang Yo‑ching 蔣友青	Chiang Yo‑chüan 蔣友娟	Chiang Yo‑chieh 蔣友捷

Notes
- Dashed lines represent marriages
- Dotted lines represent extra-marital relationships and adoptions
- Solid lines represent descendants

== See also ==
- List of presidents of the Republic of China
- Anti-communism in China
- Chiang Ching-kuo Foundation
- Conservatism in China
- Conservatism in Taiwan
- Cross-Strait relations
- Views on Chiang Ching-kuo
- History of the Republic of China
- Military of the Republic of China
- National Revolutionary Army
- Politics of the Republic of China
- Republic of China nationalism
- Seven Seas Residence
- Sino-Soviet relations
- Taiwan–United States relations
- Chiang family

== Notes ==
Government offices
Preceded by Yu Ta-wei	Minister of National Defence of the Republic of China; 1965–1969	Succeeded by Huang Chieh
Preceded by Yen Chia-kan	Premier of the Republic of China; 1972–1978	Succeeded by Sun Yun-suan
Political offices
Preceded by Yen Chia-kan	Acting Vice President of the Republic of China; 1975–1978	Succeeded by Hsieh Tung-ming
Preceded by Yen Chia-kan	President of the Republic of China; 1978–1988	Succeeded by Lee Teng-hui
Party political offices
Preceded by Chiang Kai-shek; Director-General of the Kuomintang	Chairman of the Kuomintang; 1975–1988	Succeeded by Lee Teng-hui
