= Chiang Hsiao-yung =

Taiwanese politician (1948–1996)

Eddie Chiang Hsiao-yung
- 蔣孝勇
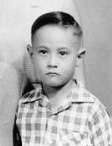
- Born: 1 October 1948; Shanghai, Republic of China
- Died: 22 December 1996 (aged 48); Taipei, Taiwan
- Education: National Taiwan University
- Political party: Kuomintang
- Spouse: Chiang Fang Chih-yi
- Children: Demos Chiang Yo-bo, Edward Chiang Yo-chang, Andrew Chiang Yo-ching
- Parent(s): Chiang Ching-kuo; Chiang Fang-liang

Chiang Hsiao-yung (traditional Chinese: 蔣孝勇; simplified Chinese: 蒋孝勇; pinyin: Jiǎng Xiàoyǒng; also known as Eddie Chiang; October, 1948 – December 22, 1996) was a politician of the Republic of China.

== Biography ==
Chiang was born in Shanghai, Republic of China in 1948. He was the third son of Chiang Ching-kuo, the President of the Republic of China in Taiwan from 1978 to 1988. His mother was Faina Ipatyevna Vakhreva, also known as Chiang Fang-liang. He had two older brothers, Hsiao-wen and Hsiao-wu, and one older sister, Hsiao-chang. He also had two half-brothers, Winston Chang and John Chiang, with whom he shared the same father.

After a brief political career in the Kuomintang in 1988, he emigrated to Canada with his family. In 1996, he died in Taiwan at the Taipei Veterans General Hospital as a result of esophageal cancer, aged 48. He was survived by his wife Chiang Fang Chi-yi and three sons.

As of November 2013, Chiang Fang Chi-yi is a member of the Kuomintang Central Committee while his eldest son Demos Chiang is a successful designer and businessman. Andrew Chiang, his youngest son, was charged with making threatening comments against the faculty of the Taipei American School through email and Facebook in 2013. He was convicted in 2015, and fined NT$183,000.
