= Chiang Hsiao-wen =

Eldest son of Chiang Ching-Kuo (1935–1989)

Alan Chiang Hsiao-wen
- 蔣孝文
- Born: Erik Nikolayevich Elizarov (Russian: Эрик Николаевич Елизаров); 14 December 1935; Sverdlovsk, Sverdlovsk Oblast, Soviet Union
- Died: 14 April 1989 (aged 53); Taipei Veterans General Hospital, Taipei, Taiwan
- Education: University of California, Berkeley
- Spouse: Nancy Xu (m.1960-1989)
- Children: 1
- Parent(s): Chiang Ching-kuo; Chiang Fang-liang

Chiang Hsiao-wen (Chinese: 蔣孝文, also known as Alan Chiang; né Erik Nikolayevich Elizarov (Note: Russian: Эрик Николаевич Елизаров); 14 December 1935 – 14 April 1989) was the eldest son of Chiang Ching-kuo, the President of the Republic of China in Taiwan from 1978 to 1988. His mother was Faina Ipatyevna Vakhreva, also known as Chiang Fang-liang. He had one younger sister, Hsiao-chang, and two younger brothers, Hsiao-wu and Hsiao-yung. He had two half-brothers, Winston Chang and John Chiang, with whom he shared the same father.

He married Xu Nai Jin (Nancy) (Chinese: 蔣徐乃錦) in 1960 and had a daughter, Yomei, in 1961. He served as chairman of the Taiwan Power Co. for two years and briefly served as the vice president of a petrochemical firm before suffering severe brain damage in 1970 while being treated for diabetes and was subsequently hidden from the public. He died of throat cancer on April 14, 1989.
