= Hukou incident =

Taiwanese coup attempt

The Hukou incident (Chinese: 湖口兵變) also known as the Hukou Mutiny was an attempted coup d'état in Taiwan initiated by the deputy commander of the 1st Armor Division headquarters, General Chao Chih-hwa, on January 21, 1964.

== Events of the coup ==
The incident took place on January 21, 1964, in Hukou, Hsinchu, Taiwan. During a staff meeting at the 1st Armor Division headquarters, General Chao Chih-hwa (趙志華), then deputy commander of the armored battle group, criticized General Chou Chih-jo (周至柔), the Chief of the General Staff on charges of corruption and encouraged fellow officers at the meeting to revolt. He was reported as saying "Our leader is being deceived by treacherous people, we must move our forces to Taipei to remove them." ("當今主上為小人所蒙蔽，我們要把部隊開到台北勤王清君側"). He was quickly arrested by two political warfare officers, but the Army nonetheless received erroneous information that the 1st Armor Division was on the move, and deployed troops to intercept the "rebel forces" that did not exist.

Chao was court-martialed and sentenced to death, but the sentence was never carried out. His sentence was later reduced to life in prison after the death of Chiang Kai-shek, and Chao died in 1983. Chao's superior Chiang Wei-kuo, who was Chiang Kai-shek's adopted son, was also punished and never held any real power in the military again.
