= Xikou =

Xikou 溪口镇 Chikow/Hsikow/Kikow
- Town
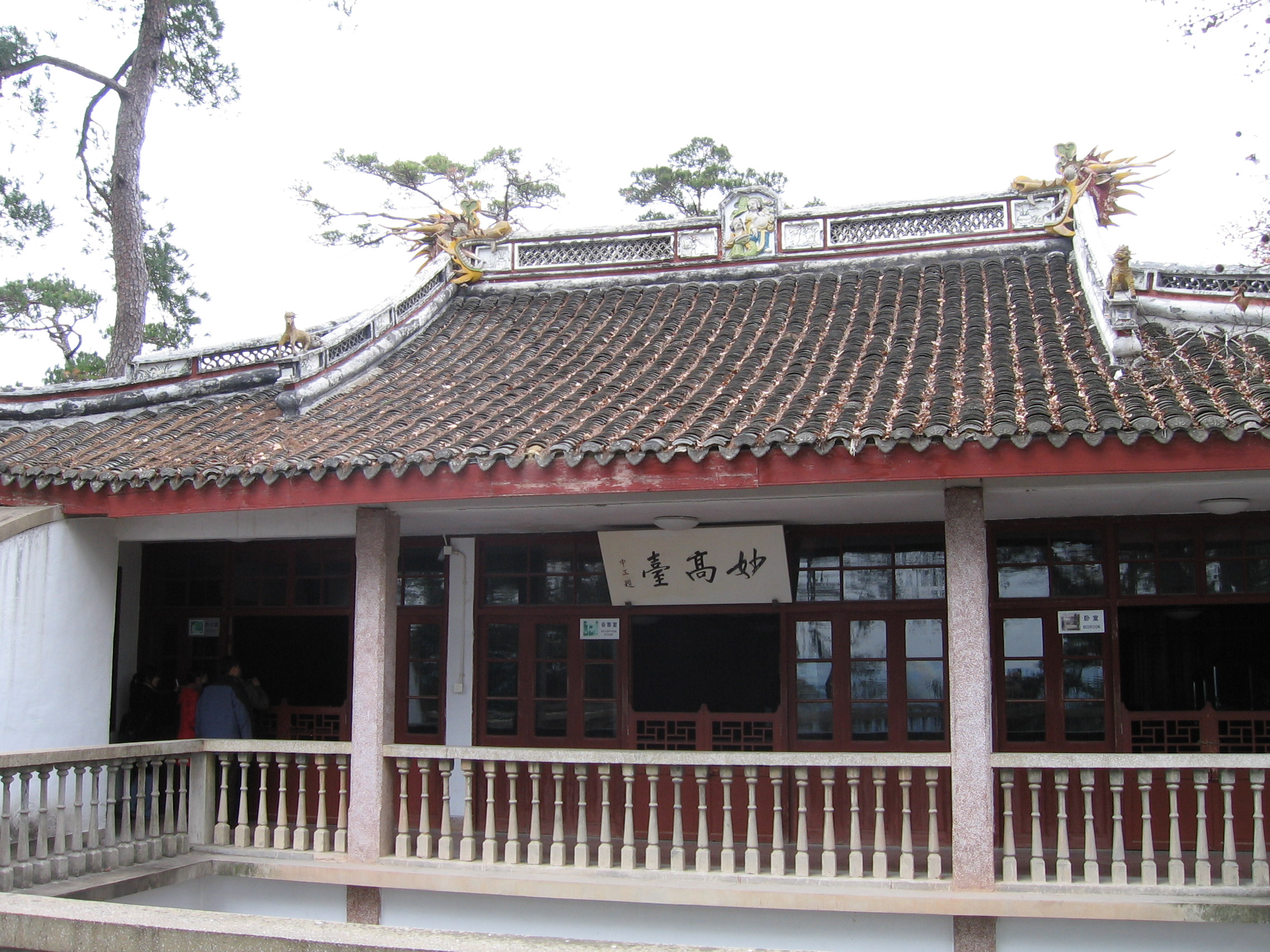
- The second story of Chiang Kai-shek's home

- Location in Zhejiang Xikou (Zhejiang)
- Coordinates: 29°41′23″N 121°16′34″E
- Country: China
- Province: Zhejiang
- Sub-provincial city: Ningbo
- District: Fenghua

Area
  - Total: 381 km^{2} (147 sq mi)

Population
  - Total: 84,000
  - Density: 220/km^{2} (570/sq mi)
- Time zone: UTC+8 (China Standard)
- Postal code: 315500

Xikou (the town when Fenghua was a county)
- Chinese: 溪口
- Postal: Chikow/Hsikow/Kikow
Transcriptions
Standard Mandarin
- Hanyu Pinyin: Xīkǒu
- Wade–Giles: Hsi^{1}-k'ou^{3}

Xikou (simplified Chinese: 溪口镇; traditional Chinese: 溪口鎮; pinyin: Xīkǒu Zhèn; Wade–Giles: Hsi^{1}-k'ou^{3} Chen^{4}) is a town of 84,000 in northeastern Zhejiang province, People's Republic of China. It is located 39 kilometers (24 mi) west of Ningbo and covers 381 square kilometers (147 sq mi). It is under the administration of Fenghua District, and is the birthplace and ancestral home of the former President of the Republic of China Chiang Kai-shek. Mao Fumei, divorced wife of ROC President Chiang Kai-shek and mother of ROC President Chiang Ching-kuo, was killed during the Japanese bombing of Xikou on December 12, 1939.
