= Chiang Hsiao-wu =

Taiwanese diplomat (1945–1991)

Alex Chiang Hsiao-wu DUBC
- 蔣孝武
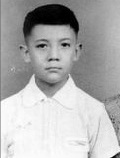

ROC Representative to Japan
- In office January 1990 – June 1991
- Succeeded by: Hsu Shui-teh

Personal details
- Born: 25 April 1945 Chekiang, Republic of China
- Died: 1 July 1991 (aged 46) Taipei Veterans General Hospital, Taipei, Taiwan
- Party: Kuomintang
- Spouse: Michelle Chiang Tsai Hui-mei
- Children: Alexandra Chiang Yo-lan, Johnathan Chiang Yo-sung
- Education: Chinese Culture University; Munich School of Political Science

Chiang Hsiao-wu DUBC (Chinese: 蔣孝武; pinyin: Jiǎng Xiàowǔ; also known as Alex Chiang; April 25, 1945 – July 1, 1991) was the second son of Chiang Ching-kuo, the President of the Republic of China in Taiwan from 1978 to 1988. His mother is Faina Ipatyevna Vakhreva, also known as Chiang Fang-liang. He had one older brother, Hsiao-wen, one older sister, Hsiao-chang, and one younger brother, Hsiao-yung. He also had two half-brothers, Winston Chang and John Chiang, with whom he shared the same father.

He was president of the state-run Broadcasting Corporation of China from 1980 to 1986, and later headed the Republic of China mission to Singapore for two years, starting in April 1986 as the deputy trade representative before being transferred to the mission to Japan in 1990. In a December 1985 speech, Hsiao-wu's father Chiang Ching-kuo declared "If someone asks me whether anyone in my family would run for the next presidential term, my reply is, 'It can't be and it won't be.'" Prior to the speech, Chiang Hsiao-wu was the only one of Chiang Ching-kuo's sons mentioned as a potential successor.

He died at the age of 46, on July 1, 1991, at the Taipei Veterans General Hospital in Taiwan as a result of congestive heart failure brought on by chronic inflammation of the pancreas. He was survived by his wife and two children.

== Awards and decorations ==
- Distinguished Service Order, in 1990.
