= Chiang Hsiao-chang =

Daughter of Chiang Ching-kuo

Amy Chiang Hsiao-chang
- 蔣孝章
- Born: February 15, 1938 (age 88); Nanchang, Republic of China
- Education: Mills College
- Spouse: Yu Yang-ho
- Children: Theodore Yu Tsu-sheng
- Parent(s): Chiang Ching-kuo; Chiang Fang-liang

Chiang Hsiao-chang (Chinese: 蔣孝章; pinyin: Jiǎng Xiàozhāng, also known as Amy Chiang; born 1938) is the only daughter of Chiang Ching-kuo, the President of the Republic of China in Taiwan from 1978 to 1988. Her mother was Chiang Fang-liang. She had one older brother, Hsiao-wen, and two younger brothers, Hsiao-wu and Hsiao-yung. She is the only living member of Chiang Ching-kuo's legitimate children, and was the only one among the siblings who could converse in Russian with their mother. She also has twin half-brothers, Winston Chang and John Chiang, with whom she shares the same father. She attended Mills College and was featured in LIFE during her college years. She was married to Yu Yang-ho (俞揚和; Yú Yánghé) until his death in 2010; he was the son of former Taiwan defense minister Yu Ta-wei (俞大維; Yú Dàwéi). She and Yu have one son, Theodore Yu Tsu-sheng (俞祖聲; Yú Zǔshēng).

== Personal life ==
Chiang Hsiao-chang's husband, Yu Yang-ho, is the eldest son of Yu Ta-wei, the Minister of National Defense of the Republic of China, and his German-Italian wife. Chiang and Yu met and married while studying in the United States. In the spring of 1961, they had a son. The newborn's maternal grandfather, Chiang Ching-kuo, named his first grandson Yu Tsu-sheng using the ancient poem "克紹祖裘，聲望遠播" ("Inherit the ancestors' robes, and let their fame be widely spread").
