= Yao Yecheng =

Concubine of Chiang Kai-shek

- Born: 26 August 1887; Wu County, Jiangsu, China
- Died: September 7, 1967 (aged 80); Taichung, Taiwan
- Spouse: Chiang Kai-shek (m. 1913–1927)
- Children: Chiang Wei-kuo (adopted)

Yao Yecheng (姚冶誠, 26 August 1887 – 7 September 1967), along with Chen Jieru (also known as "Jennie"), was among the two concubines of Kuomintang leader Chiang Kai-shek, during the time when Chiang was also in an arranged marriage to Mao Fumei. In 1921, Chiang married Jennie. In 1927, Chiang divorced Mao and exiled Jennie—denying any association with the latter. In the same year, Chiang also dropped Yao and married Soong Mei-ling.

Yao was a sing-song girl whom Chiang "took as his concubine" though at the time she "belonged to an elderly man who became jealous of her relationship" with Chiang. Once as she was serving bubbling-hot soup at a meal with both Chiang and the elderly patron present, the elder seized the bowl and emptied it onto her head while chiding her about the contacts with Chiang—an assault in which "the boiling liquid disfigured her, and ruined her career of entertaining men in teahouses."

Yao lived with Chiang for a time at a villa at 99 Daichengqiao Road in Suzhou. The spacious villa, later renamed Garden Hotel Suzhou, still stands and was used by the Communist Chinese government as an "official state guest house for leaders of the Party, the State and foreign countries" and visiting celebrities. It is now a hotel open to the general public.

Chiang entrusted Yao with the parenting of his adopted son Chiang Wei-kuo (蔣緯國, "Wego", 1916–1997). Young "Wego" grew up to study military tactics in Nazi Germany where he commanded a Panzer unit before being recalled to China in 1938 where he was quickly promoted through ranks up to major general in the Kuomintang's National Revolutionary Army; he later was a senior officer in the Taiwanese Republic of China Armed Forces (until 1964 when he was moved to figurehead status after the Hukou Incident).

Yao died in Taichung on 7 September 1967.
