= Demos Chiang =

Taiwanese-Canadian businessman

- 蔣友柏
- Born: Chiang Yu-bou; September 10, 1976 (age 50); Taipei, Taiwan
- Citizenship: Taiwan; Canada
- Education: New York University (BS)
- Occupation: Businessman
- Spouse: Lin Heng-yi (m. 2003; div. 2018)
- Children: 2
- Parents: Chiang Hsiao-yung; Chiang Fang Chi-yi
- Relatives: Chiang Kai-shek; (great-grandfather); Chiang Ching-kuo; (grandfather)

Chinese name
- Traditional Chinese: 蔣友柏
- Simplified Chinese: 蒋友柏
Transcriptions
Standard Mandarin
- Hanyu Pinyin: Jiǎng You-bo
- Wade–Giles: Chiang Yu-bou

Demos Yu-bou Chiang (Chinese: 蔣友柏; born 10 September 1976) is a Taiwanese and Canadian businessman. He founded DEM Inc. (橙果設計), a popular design studio in Taiwan in July 2003 and has served as its chairman since then. He is also known for being the great-grandson of the late Republic of China (ROC) President Chiang Kai-shek and the grandson of late President Chiang Ching-kuo. His grandmother was Faina Ipatyevna Vakhreva, also known as Chiang Fang-liang.

== Biography ==
Born to Chiang Ching-kuo's third son Chiang Hsiao-yung and his wife Chiang Fang Chi-yi, he is the eldest of three sons. Demos Chiang was born and raised in Taipei until his grandfather's death in 1988. After his grandfather's death, Chiang's parents sent him to live in Canada and later the United States, though he still retained his ROC nationality, it also started the departure from politics for Demos' parents. Chiang received a bachelor's degree in Information Management from New York University in late 1990s. After graduating, Chiang worked in the entertainment and fashion industries in Taiwan, Hong Kong and Singapore, until founding DEM Inc. in 2003.

In Spring 2001, Chiang began a relationship with local starlet Lin Heng-yi, the daughter of Buddhist Tzu Chi General Hospital's then president Lin Hsin-jung. The couple married in February 2003; a daughter was born in 2003 and a son born in 2005. They divorced in July 2018.

Despite his pedigree and celebrity identity, Demos Chiang has repeatedly announced in recent years that he is not interested in politics. He has also accused both the Kuomintang and the Democratic Progressive Party for "poor political tactics", especially for utilizing Chiang Kai-shek and Chiang Ching-kuo as figures of worship or denigration. In contrast to other prominent members of the Chiang family, such as John Chiang and his mother Chiang Fang Chi-yi, Demos Chiang has expressed his belief that the controversies of his ancestors should be faced fairly and left to history. He started a personal blog in January 2008 to further explain his beliefs.
