= Chen Jieru =

Second wife of Chiang Kai-shek

- 陳潔如
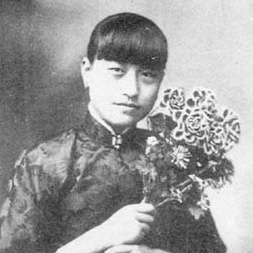
- Born: 26 August 1906; Shanghai, Jiangsu, Qing Dynasty
- Died: 21 January 1971 (aged 64); British Hong Kong
- Resting place: Fushou Park, Qingpu, Shanghai; 31°06′32.7″N 121°07′46.6″E
- Political party: Kuomintang
- Spouse: Chiang Kai-shek (m. 1921–1927)
- Children: Chiang Yao-kuang (adopted)

Chen Jieru
- Traditional Chinese: 陳潔如
- Simplified Chinese: 陈洁如
Transcriptions
Standard Mandarin
- Hanyu Pinyin: Chén Jiérú
- Wade–Giles: Ch'en2 Chieh2-ju2

Chen Jieru (Chinese: 陳潔如; 26 August 1906 – 21 January 1971), also romanized Ch'en Chieh-ju, was the second wife of Chiang Kai-shek. She was nicknamed Jennie.

Chen's ancestral hometown was Ningbo, Zhejiang Province, but she was born in Shanghai. She wrote a memoir which Chiang successfully suppressed during his lifetime.

It was finally published in 1993. In the memoir, Chen details how she and Chiang Kai-shek met at the home of a mutual friend in 1918 and how he pursued her, finally convincing her to marry him on 5 December 1921 by stating that his arranged marriage with Mao Fumei was unhappy and celibate, and his liaison with Yao Yecheng was a social courtesy following her disfigurement. The couple held their wedding at East Hotel in Shanghai.

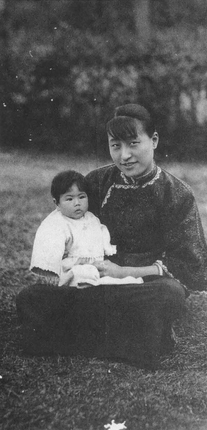
Chen Jieru with daughter Chiang Yao-kuang at Whampoa Military Academy in 1926

Chiang promised Chen that he was marrying Soong Meiling ("Madame Chiang") for political convenience before a Buddhist shrine, saying "Should I break my promise and fail to take her back, may the Great Buddha smite me and my Nanjing government.", and arranged for her to go to the United States on a five-year "study tour"; after this she was meant to return and married life would resume. However, once there, Chen learned from press articles that Chiang denied their marriage and said that he had paid for a "concubine" to move to the United States, which deeply aggrieved Chen.

== Death ==
Chen died on 21 January 1971 in British Hong Kong. In 2002, her remains were moved to Shanghai by her sole heir, fulfilling her last wish to be returned to her native place, making her the first in Chiang Kai-shek's family to be buried in Mainland China after the end of Chinese Civil War in 1949. Her remains were then laid at Fushou Park in Qingpu District, Shanghai.

The Kuomintang asked Jennie Chen for all copies of her diaries and memoirs, but in 1971 American author Ginny Connor took notes from Chen's memoirs. In 1993, Connor stated that she planned to write her own book based on the notes since Chiang Kai-shek's Secret Past, another memoir based on notes from Jennie Chen, had been published.

== Works ==
- Chiang Kai-shek's Secret Past - A memoir
