= Taipei Veterans General Hospital =

Hospital in Beitou, Taipei, Taiwan

Taipei Veterans General Hospital 台北榮民總醫院
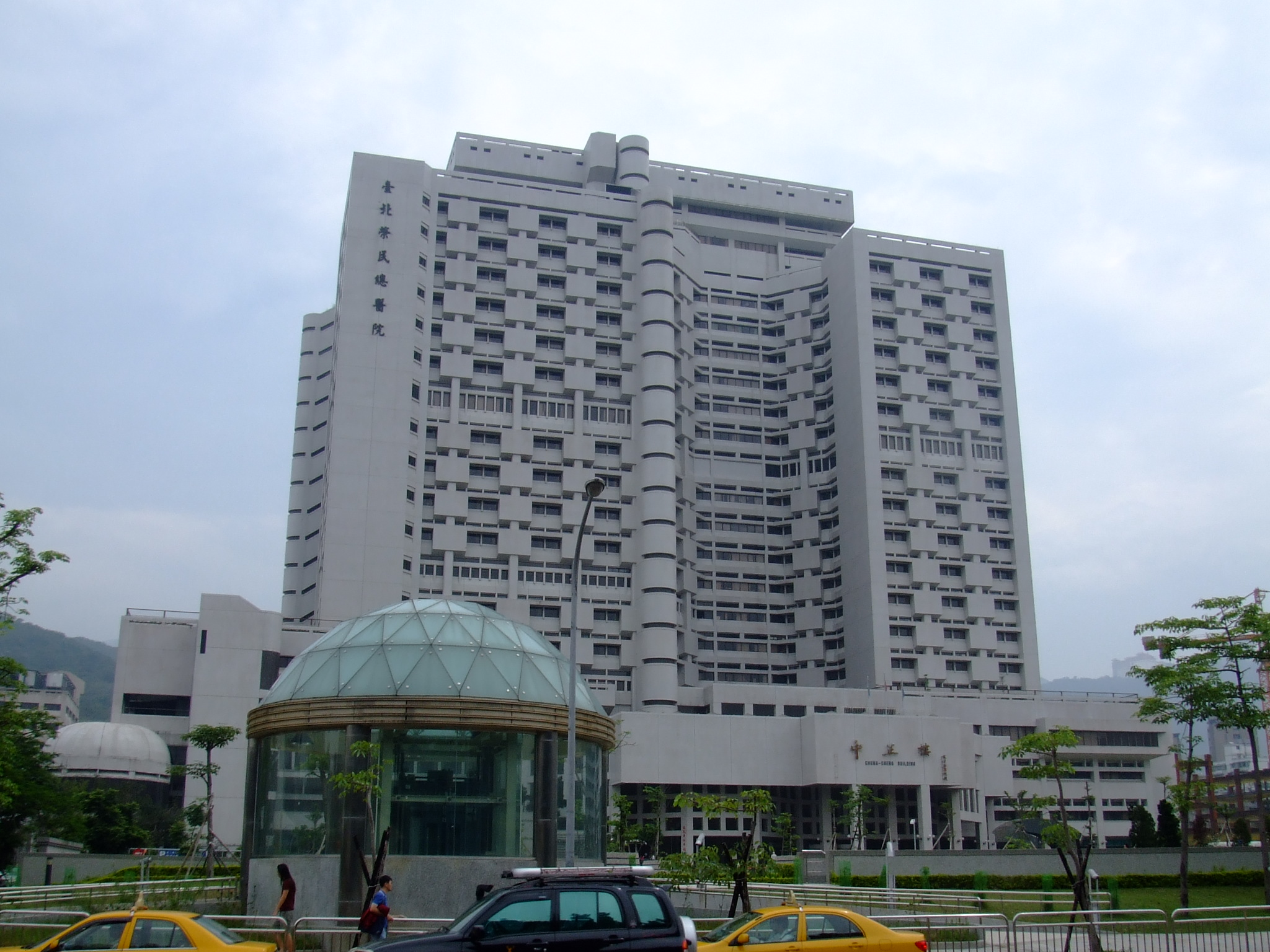

Geography
- Location: Beitou, Taipei, Taiwan
- Coordinates: 25°7′8.9″N 121°31′10.4″E

Organisation
- Type: Military, Teaching

Services
- Beds: 3,000

History
- Opened: 1958

Links
- Website: www.vghtpe.gov.tw

Taipei Veterans General Hospital (Chinese: 台北榮民總醫院; pinyin: Táiběi Róngmín Zǒngyī Yuàn) is a national first-class medical center and a teaching hospital that provides tertiary patient care, undergraduate medical education programs and residency programs in Taiwan. It was founded in 1958 and administered by the Veterans Affairs Council. It is in Beitou District, Taipei and mainly serves patients in northern Taipei and New Taipei. Three branches, Taoyuan Veterans Hospital, Yuanshan Veterans Hospital, and Suao Veterans Hospital, were established.

== Achievements ==
=== Medical research ===
- First Gamma-knife radiosurgery in Taiwan. (January 1993)
- First Neurological Institute (Department of Neurology and Department of Neurosurgery) in Taiwan (1989) has been pioneering in neurocritical medicine, headache, cerebellar ataxia, dementia, neural regeneration and repair, and epilepsy research and patient care of the nation.
- Established National PET/Cyclotron Center (first in Taiwan and second in Asia), leading the country into a new era of "In vivo Biochemical Imaging." (1992)
- First AIDS virus harvested in Asia. (1986)
- First IVF baby in Taiwan. (1985)
- First percutaneous transluminal coronary angioplasty (PTCA) in Taiwan. (July 1983)
- The computer-monitored resectoscope for transurethral prostatectomy was invented in 1983.
- First successfully detected Down syndrome baby through amniocentesis in Taiwan. (1981)

=== Medical care ===
- Founded 16-bed Hospice and Palliative Care Unit. (1997)
- Established therapeutic networks between County Hospital to deliver better health-care services to people in remote areas. (1996)
- Established the first tele-medical consultation with Kinmen County Hospital to make diagnosis for remote island residents. (1996)
- Established the Laminar Air Flow Room and the Bone Marrow Transplantation Center. (1995)

== Transportation ==
The hospital is in walking distance northeast from Shipai Station of the Taipei Metro.

== Controversy ==
There was a union strike against the hospital in June 2026, citing the deliberately difficult process of getting overtime pay and many restrictions imposed on it. The hospital superindendent, Chen Wei-ming, responded and said it had implemented a sistem to calculate overtime pay since 2024 and any remaining overdue overtime pay in the past five years will be retroactively paid.

== See also ==
- List of hospitals in Taiwan
