= Mao Fumei =

First wife of Chiang Kai-shek (1882–1939)

- 毛福梅
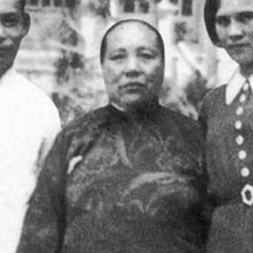
- Born: 9 November 1882; Fenghua, Zhejiang, Qing China
- Died: 12 December 1939 (aged 57); Xikou, Zhejiang, Republic of China
- Spouse: Chiang Kai-shek (m. 1901; div. 1921)
- Children: Chiang Ching-kuo
- Father: Mao Dinghe (毛鼎和)

Mao Fumei
- Chinese: 毛福梅
Transcriptions
Standard Mandarin
- Hanyu Pinyin: Máo Fúméi
- Wade–Giles: Mao2 Fu2-mei2

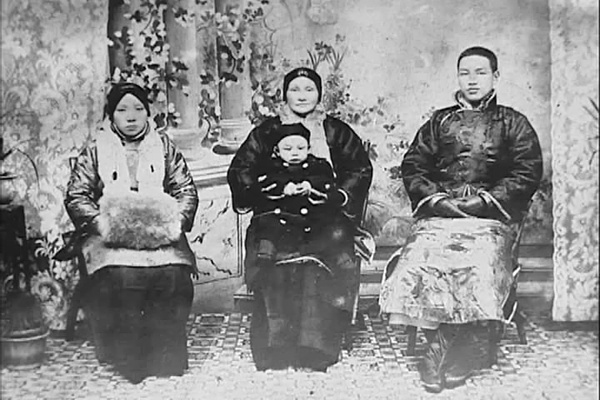
Family picture of Mao (left), her mother-in-law Wang Caiyu (middle) holding her son Chiang Ching-kuo (front), and her husband Chiang Kai-Shek (right), taken in 1910

Mao Fumei (Chinese: 毛福梅; pinyin: Máo Fúméi, 9 November 1882 – 12 December 1939) was the first wife of Chiang Kai-shek, and the biological mother of Chiang Ching-Kuo.

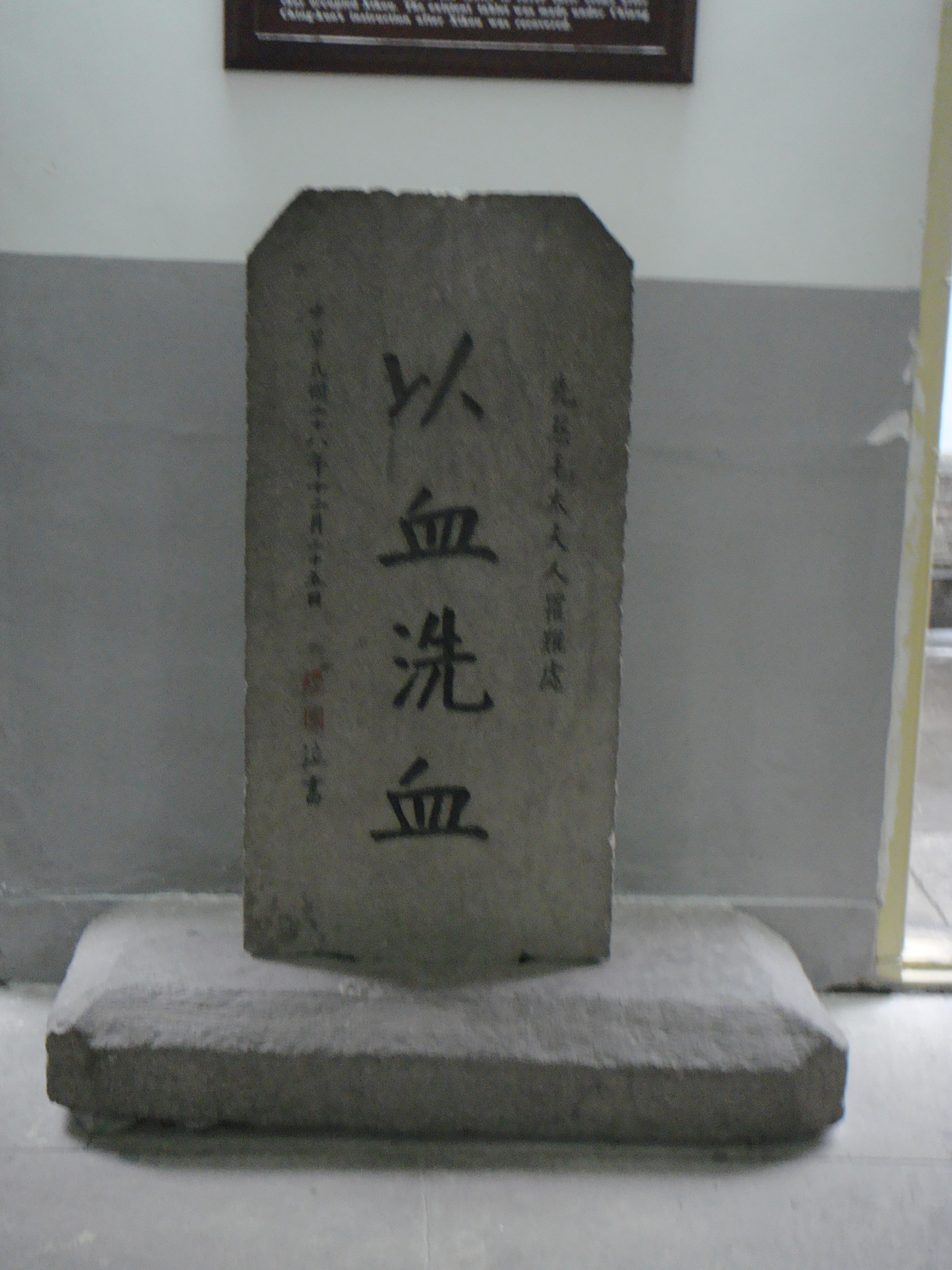
Tablet of Returning Blood with Blood- Promising to avenge his mother's death, Chiang Ching-Kuo had the words "以血洗血" ('wash away blood with blood') carved on a tablet

Mao was born in Fenghua, Ningbo, Zhejiang Province, and, like most women of the era, she was illiterate. She married Chiang Kai-shek in an arranged marriage in 1901. When Chiang came back from Japan, he divorced her in 1921. She was killed in 1939 in a Japanese air raid on the Chiang family home in Xikou.
