= Graduate School of Chinese Academy of Social Sciences =

- 中国社会科学院研究生院
- Logo of the School
- Motto: 笃学 慎思 明辨 尚行 (Chinese)
- Motto in English: 'Inquire for truth, inspect to thoughts; inherit by scepticisms, involve with virtues'
- Type: Public
- Established: 1978; 48 years ago
- Affiliations: CASS
- President: Wang Xinqing (王新清)
- Academic staff: >900
- Students: 1600
- Location: Beijing, China
- Campus: 6.1 acres (25,000 m^{2})
- Website: www.gscass.cn

Chinese name
- Simplified Chinese: 中国社会科学院研究生院
- Traditional Chinese: 中國社會科學院研究生院
Transcriptions
Standard Mandarin
- Hanyu Pinyin: Zhōngguó Shèhuì Kēxuéyuàn Yánjiūshēngyuàn

The Graduate School of Chinese Academy of Social Sciences (中国社会科学院研究生院) was a public graduate school headquartered in Beijing, China. It was affiliated with the Chinese Academy of Social Sciences. The school was reconstructed to form the University of Chinese Academy of Social Sciences in 2017.

== History ==
Founded in 1978, the Graduate School of Chinese Academy of Social Sciences was approved by the top leaders of the People's Republic of China in the form of an Executive Order. Different from other graduate schools run by university or college, the Graduate School of Chinese Academy of Social Sciences functions under the authority of China's main organ of research in the social sciences — the Chinese Academy of Social Sciences (CASS) — one of the largest state-run research organizations that provide policy-making suggestions in social, national and international domains.

Originally, the purpose of GSCASS was to construct a Prospect Research Faculty Incubator, in order to provide qualified first-class research candidates to aid the Chinese Academy of Social Sciences. Over time, the Graduate School has emerged as a general institution for higher learning. A high percentage of GSCASS graduates enter the Legislative, Executive and Judicial branches of Chinese government and research organizations. As such, it plays a leading role in academic research, policy-making, and social movement. The establishment of GSCASS made a huge impact on Chinese education and training in the humanities and social sciences, at the dawn of the reform and opening up.

== List of presidents ==
1. Zhou Yang (周扬) 1978-1982
2. Wen Jize (温济泽) 1982-1985
3. Hu Sheng (胡绳) 1985-1990
4. Jiang Liu (江流) 1990-1991
5. Pu Shan (浦山) 1991-1994
6. Fang Keli (方克立) 1994-2000
7. Li Tieying (李铁映) 2000-2002
8. Wu Yin (武寅) 2002-2007
9. Liu Yingqiu (刘迎秋) 2007–present

== Campus life ==
The campus was in Wangjing area, northeast of the Beijing city, adjacent to Central Academy of Fine Arts, Beijing Youth Politics College and China Medical University. Small in scale, it was well integrated and fully equipped, exuding a kind of 1980s’ spirit and confidence which is rare today.

By the end of 2009, the new advanced campus site in the Beijing Liangxiang University Park of Higher Education was to come into service. The former campus site functions as an auxiliary facility till then.

== Notable faculty ==
=== Committee members and senior professors of DPSS, CAS (1955) ===
1. Yu Guangyuan (于光远), Economics, Sociology, and Philosophy
2. Ji Xianlin (季羡林), Indology (Sanskrit, Pali, Tocharian)
3. Chen Hansheng (陈翰笙), History of Asia
4. Liu Danian (刘大年), Modern History of China
5. Lü Shuxiang (吕叔湘), Chinese Grammar Studies
6. Luo Gengmo (骆耕漠), Economics
7. Qian Junrui (钱俊瑞), Rural Economics
8. Xia Nai (夏鼐), Archeology and Field Excavation
9. Xu Dixin (许涤新), Economics
10. Feng Zhi (冯至), Chinese Classical Literature and German Philosophy
11. He Lin (贺麟), Philosophy
12. Yin Da (尹达), NeolithicArcheology
13. Zhang Youyu (张友渔), Law

=== Committee members emeritus, CASS (2006) ===
Yu Zuyao (于祖尧)

Qiu Shihua (仇士华)

Kong Fan (孔繁)

Wang Zhongshu (王仲殊)

Wang Qingcheng (王庆成)

Wang Guichen (王贵宸)

Wang Gengjin (王耕今)

Deng Shaoji (邓绍基)

Liu Shide (刘世德)

Liu Keming (刘克明)

Liu Nanlai (刘楠来)

Liu Kuili (刘魁立)

Lu Daji (吕大吉)

Zhu Zhai (朱寨)

Zhu Shaowen (朱绍文)

He Zhenyi (何振一)

Yu Shengwu (余绳武)

Yu Dunkang (余敦康)

Tong Zhuchen (佟柱臣)

Wu Yuanmai (吴元迈)

Wu Chengming (吴承明)

Wu Jiajun (吴家骏)

Zhang Jiong (张炯)

Zhang Changshou (张长寿)

Zhang Shouyi (张守一)

Zhang Zexian (张泽咸)

Zhang Chunnian (张椿年)

Li Cong (李琮)

Li Daokui (李道揆)

Li Buyun (李步云)

Du Jiwen (杜继文)

Yang Tianshi (杨天石)

Yang Zengwen (杨曾文)

Wang Haibo (汪海波)

Wang Jingyu (汪敬虞)

Gu Yuanyang (谷源洋)

Chen Shen (陈燊)

Chen Dongsheng (陈栋生)

Chen Zhihua (陈之骅)

Chen Leming (陈乐民)

Chen Qineng (陈启能)

Chen Yunquan (陈筠泉)

Chen Yupi (陈毓罴)

Jin Yijiu (金宜久)

Zhao Renwei (赵人伟)

Zhao Fengqi (赵凤岐)

Luo Gengmo (洛耕漠)

Xu Pingfang (徐苹芳)

Xu Chongwen (徐崇温)

Tu Jiliang (涂纪亮)

Zi Zhongyun (资中筠)

Guo Songyi (郭松义)

Qian Zhongwen (钱中文)

Gao Dichen (高涤陈)

Liang Cunxiu (梁存秀)

Huang Xinchuan (黄心川)

Huang Shaoxiang (黄绍湘)

Dong Hengxun (董衡巽)

Dao Bu (道布)

Han Yanlong (韩延龙)

Cai Meibiao (蔡美彪)

Dai Yuanchen (戴园晨)

Qu Tongzu (瞿同祖)

=== Committee members, CASS (2006) ===
Fang Keli (方克立)

Wang Shuwen (王叔文)

Wang Jiafu (王家福)

Shi Jinbo (史金波)

Ye Xiushan (叶秀山)

Tian Xueyuan (田雪原)

Liu Qingzhu (刘庆柱)

Liu Guoguang (刘国光)

Liu Shucheng (刘树成)

Lu Zheng (吕政)

Ru Xin (汝信)

Jiang Lansheng (江蓝生)

Yu Yongding (余永定)

Leng Rong (冷溶)

Zhang Zhuoyuan (张卓远)

Zhang Xiaoshan (张晓山)

Zhang Haipeng (张海鹏)

Zhang Yunling (张蕴岭)

Li Yang (李扬)

Li Jingwen (李京文)

Li Chongfu (李崇富)

Li Jingyuan (李景源)

Li Jingjie (李静杰)

Yang Yi (杨义)

Yang Shengming (杨圣明)

Wang Tongsan (汪同三)

Shen Jiaxuan (沈家煊)

Su Zhenxing (苏振兴)

Chen Jiagui (陈佳贵)

Chen Zuwu (陈祖武)

Chen Gaohua (陈高华)

Zhuo Xinping (卓新平)

Zhou Hong (周弘)

Zhou Shulian (周叔莲)

Lin Ganquan (林甘泉)

Zheng Chengsi (郑成思)

Hao Shiyuan (郝时远)

Geng Yunzhi (耿云志)

Liang Huixing (梁慧星)

Huang Baosheng (黄宝生)

Jing Tiankui (景天魁)

Qiu Yuanlun (裘元伦)

Jin Huiming (靳辉明)

Liao Xuesheng (廖学盛)

== Notable alumni ==
=== Party and state leaders ===
- Bo Xilai (薄熙来)
- Chen Yuan (陈元)

=== Governors and state officials ===
- Liu Binjie (柳斌杰)
- Wang Chen (王晨)
- Zhu Weiqun (朱维群)
- Li Zhanshu (栗战书)
- Yang Jing (杨晶)
- Yang Chuantang (杨传堂)
- Xin Chunying (信春鹰)
- He Jiacheng (何家成)
- Ye Xiaowen (叶小文)
- Huang Xiaoxiang (黄小祥)
- Li Jiheng (李纪恒)
- Jiang Zelin (江泽林)
- Yang Xiong (杨雄)
- Ma Jiantang (马建堂)
- Wu Lan (乌兰)
- Han Zhiran (韩志然)
- Xing Yun (邢云)
- Jin Daoming (金道铭)

=== Scholars ===
- Shen Jiaxuan (沈家煊)
- Xiaokai Yang (杨小凯)
- Fan Gang (樊纲)
- Gu Hailiang (顾海良)
- Wang Chaohua (王超华)

=== Writers ===
- Xu Kun (徐坤)
- Jiang Rong (姜戎)
- Zhang Chengzhi (张承志)

=== Entrepreneurs ===
- Kong Dan (孔丹)

== Events ==
1. August 21, 1978: Top leaders of the Central Government of China, Ye Jianying, Deng Xiaoping, Wu Lanfu and Wang Dongxing, etc. signed the bill of The Graduate School of Chinese Academy of Social Sciences into executive order. The first humanity and social science graduate school of China was thence established.
2. Sept. 21st, 1981- the 1st Commencement of the Graduate School of Chinese Academy of Social Sciences was held at the National Museum of Chinese History.
3. July 17, 1982: The 1st Degree Conferring Ceremony of the Graduate School of Chinese Academy of Social Sciences was held at the Great Hall of the People.
4. August 15, 1984: Construction of Chaoyang campus (the campus currently in use) broke earth.
5. October 8, 1988: The Ten Year Anniversary of the Graduate School of Chinese Academy of Social Sciences was held at the Hall of Chinese People's Political Consultative Conference.
6. 1989: The Political Unrest of 1989 in Beijing made great impact to the Graduate School of Chinese Academy of Social Sciences. The GSCASS was suspended from enrolling for three years which resulted in a roughly nine-year depression to the school.
7. Sept. 1st, 1998: General Sectary, President Jiang Zemin addressed to the Twenty Year Anniversary of the Graduate School of Chinese Academy of Social Sciences, “To Build the Graduate School of Chinese Academy of Social Sciences a Prominent Incubator for Talents of Humanity and Social Sciences.”
8. Sept. 25, 1998: The Twenty Year Anniversary of the Graduate School of Chinese Academy of Social Sciences was held at the Great Hall of the People.
9. July 6, 2000: The 1st Commencement for International Students of the Graduate School of Chinese Academy of Social Sciences.
10. April 26, 2005: The 1st Opening Ceremony for MPA Graduate Students.
11. April 26, 2008: New campus site in Beijing Liangxiang University Park (University) of Higher Education broke earth.
12. Sept. 27, 2008: The Thirty Year Anniversary of the Graduate School of Chinese Academy of Social Sciences.
