= Jiang Lansheng =

Chinese professor and academician

Jiang Lansheng (Chinese: 江藍生) is a Chinese professor, academician, and director of the Department of Literature and Philosophy at the Chinese Academy of Social Sciences (CASS). She is also a member of the Academic Degrees Committee of the State Council and president of the China Association for Lexicography. Jiang presided over the revision of Xinhua Dictionary (11th edition), and the Contemporary Chinese Dictionary (6th edition).

== Early life and education ==
Jiang Lansheng, female, was born in Mianyang (now Xiantao City), Hubei Province of China in November 1943.

From 1962 to 1968, Jiang Lansheng studied linguistics at the Department of Chinese Language and Literature, Peking University. After graduation from Peking University, she worked as a middle school teacher in Shanxi Province and later at the High School Affiliated to Peking University.

== Career ==
From 1978 to 1981, she studied Modern Chinese under the tutelage of Professors Lü Shuxiang and Liu Jian at the Institute of Linguistics, Chinese Academy of Social Sciences. After graduation with a Master of Arts degree, Jiang worked in the Institute, specializing in Modern Chinese Studies. From 1985, she served successively as deputy director and director of the Modern Chinese Language Research Office, and as Deputy Director and Director of the Institute.

In 1993, Jiang was promoted to research fellow and professor of the Graduate School of Chinese Academy of Social Sciences. From October 1998 to October 2006, Jiang served as Vice President of the Chinese Academy of Social Sciences.

In August 2006, she was elected as a member of the Chinese Academy of Social Sciences. From March 2003 to February 2013, she was elected member and later standing committee member of the Chinese People's Political Consultative Conference (CPPCC). In 2008, with the approval of the French government, Jiang Lansheng was awarded an honorary doctorate by the École Normale Supérieure de Lyon, France.

In recent years, Jiang Lansheng's work is mainly on leading the "Comprehensive Dictionary of Modern Chinese" project.

== Academic contributions ==
Jiang Lansheng's academic expertise lies in Chinese historical vocabulary and grammar, grammaticalization theory, language contact theory, and lexicography. She has published over 100 academic papers, 15 monographs and reference books, and 4 translations.

She presided over the revision for the 11th edition of Xinhua Dictionary and the 6th edition of Contemporary Chinese Dictionary. She also served as the deputy chief editor of The Comprehensive Dictionary of Modern Chinese (现代语大词典, the Commercial Press, 2021), a major project of the Chinese Academy of Social Sciences. Jiang Lansheng is a standing director of the Chinese Linguistic Society, and former president of the Chinese Lexicographical Society.

== See also ==
- Institute of Linguistics, Chinese Academy of Social Sciences
- Chinese Language Society
- Members of the Chinese Academy of Social Sciences
