= Chinese Language Society =

Chinese academic organization

The Chinese Language Society, or Chinese Linguistic Society (simplified Chinese: 中国语言学会; traditional Chinese: 中國語言學會; pinyin: Zhōngguó Yǔyán Xuéhuì), shortly CLS, is a national academic organization of linguists in the People's Republic of China. It was established in Wuhan, Hubei Province, in October 1980, and is supervised by the Chinese Academy of Social Sciences. The mission of the society is to "promote linguistic science research, carry out national academic activities, and organize academic exchanges at home and abroad."

It is located at the Institute of Linguistics, Chinese Academy of Social Sciences.

== Annual conference ==
The Chinese Language Society holds a national academic conference every two years. So far, 22 academic annual conferences have been held. In addition, the society holds special academic conferences, seminars and training courses from time to time according to needs and possibilities.

== Publishing ==
The Chinese Language Society edits and compiles the Journal of Chinese Linguistics (annual conference papers). A total of 21 issues have been published. In addition, the society also edits and publishes other academic works.

== Subordinate institutions ==
There are four academic divisions in the society, including

- Phonetics Division of the Chinese Language Society,
- Language Policy and Planning Professional Committee of the Chinese Language Society,
- Historical Linguistics Division of the Chinese Language Society,
- Sociolinguistics Division of the Chinese Language Society.

== Presidents ==
The presidents of the society includes:

- Lü Shuxiang (1980—1984)
- Ji Xianlin (1985—1988)
- Zhu Dexi (1989—1992)
- Liu Jian (1993—1996)
- Hou Jingyi (1997—2009)
- Shen Jiaxuan (2010—2018)
- Wang Hongjun（2019-2021）
- Zhang Bojiang（2021—2026)

== See also ==
- Institute of Linguistics (CASS)
- Chinese Academy of Social Sciences
