= Four Noes =

Chinese Communist Party slogan

Four Noes (Chinese: 四个“不是”) is a political term put forth by Xi Jinping, general secretary of the Chinese Communist Party, at a symposium on philosophy and social sciences on May 17, 2016. They are: "The great social transformation in contemporary China is not a simple continuation of the master version of our country's history and culture, nor is it a simple application of the template envisioned by classical Marxist writers, nor is it a reprint of the socialist practices of other countries, nor is it a copy of foreign modernization development."

== History ==
On 4 February 2016, Xi Jinping stated that the path of socialism with Chinese characteristics is "neither 'traditional', nor 'foreign', nor 'Westernized', but rather 'original' and the right path for mankind."

On 17 May 2016, Xi Jinping said in his speech at the Symposium on Philosophy and Social Sciences:

The great social changes in contemporary China are not a simple continuation of the master version of our country's history and culture, not a simple application of the template envisioned by the classical Marxist writers, not a reprint of the socialist practices of other countries, nor a copy of foreign modernization development. It is impossible to find a ready-made textbook.

On 4 May 2018, Xi Jinping said in his speech at the conference commemorating the 200th birth anniversary of Karl Marx:

The great social changes in contemporary China are not a simple continuation of the master version of our country's history and culture, not a simple application of the template envisioned by the classical Marxist writers, not a reprint of the socialist practices of other countries, nor a copy of foreign modernization development.

== Interpretation ==
Lin Jianhua, deputy director of the Academy of Marxism at the Chinese Academy of Social Sciences, believes that China's social transformation is not a "reprint" or "copy" but an "original" one. Ouyang Song, former director of the Central Party History Research Office, believes that this is a "new leap forward in the Sinicization of Marxism" and an important part of Xi Jinping Thought.

== See also ==
- Ideology of the Chinese Communist Party
