= Jianying Zha =

Chinese-American journalist and writer

Jianying Zha or Zha Jianying (Chinese: 查建英; born 1959) is a Chinese American writer, journliast, and media critic. She writes and publishes in both English and Chinese.

Born in Beijing, Jianying Zha was educated in China and the United States. She is a contributor to The New Yorker and The New York Times.

== Life and career ==
Zha was born in Beijing in 1959 to a family of intellectuals; her father, Zha Ruqiang, was a philosophy professor at the Chinese Academy of Social Sciences, specilising in the studies of Engels. She grew up during the Cultural Revolution, experienced home ransack of her own, and saw families torn apart. At the age of six, she recalls participating in kindergarten activities involving the pasting of Big-character posters, a common tool of political struggle at the time.

In 1978, Zha enrolled in the first class of students at the newly reopened Peking University. She left China in 1981 to study in the United States, earning a master's degree in English from the University of South Carolina in 1984 and a second master's degree in comparative literature from Columbia University in 1986.

=== Career ===
Zha is a writer, journalist, and cultural commentator in both English and Chinese. Her work has appeared widely in publications such as The New Yorker, The New York Times, Dushu (读书), and Wanxiang (万象). She has also been a regular commentator on current events on Chinese television, and worked at the India China Institute at The New School in New York.

Her work is distinguished by what critics have described as an "insider-outsider" perspective. Writing for a foreign-language audience, she has noted, "forced me to be at once more rigorous and more patient, which has been crucial for my intellectual maturity."

She wrote the introduction to the English version of The Cowshed: Memories of the Chinese Cultural Revolution upon its publication in 1996, and considered it "a devastatingly direct and detailed testimony on the physical and mental abuse an entire imprisoned intellectual community suffered."

Zha has described navigating China's censorship as a "complicated and tough terrain," with decisions varying by individual circumstances and moral considerations. In 1995, after the publication of her English-language book China Pop, Beijing publishers sought a Chinese edition but required excisions of Tiananmen Square-related content central to its analysis of post-1989 cultural shifts; Zha refused, resulting in no mainland version. Similarly, for Tide Players (2011), mainland publishers proposed an abridged edition, but Zha rejected demands to remove chapters on her dissident brother Zha Jianguo and Liu Xiaobo, leading to a full Hong Kong release; the excised sections had previously appeared in The New Yorker and circulated briefly online in China before deletion.

== Works ==
=== Books written in English ===
- China pop: how soap operas, tabloids, and bestsellers are transforming a culture. New York: New Press, 1995.
- Tide players: the movers and shakers of a rising China. New York: New Press, 2011.

=== Books written in Chinese ===
- 到美国去，到美国去！(Dào Měiguó qù, dào Měiguó qù!; ''Going to America, Going to America!'') Beijing: Zuojia chubanshe (作家出版社), 1991.
- 留美故事（Liú Měi Gùshì; Stories of Studying in America) Shijiazhuang: Huashan wenyi chubanshe 花山文艺出版社，2003
- 八十年代访谈录 (Ba shi nian dai fang tan lu; The Eighties) Hong Kong: Oxford University Press, 2006.
