= China Journalism Yearbook =

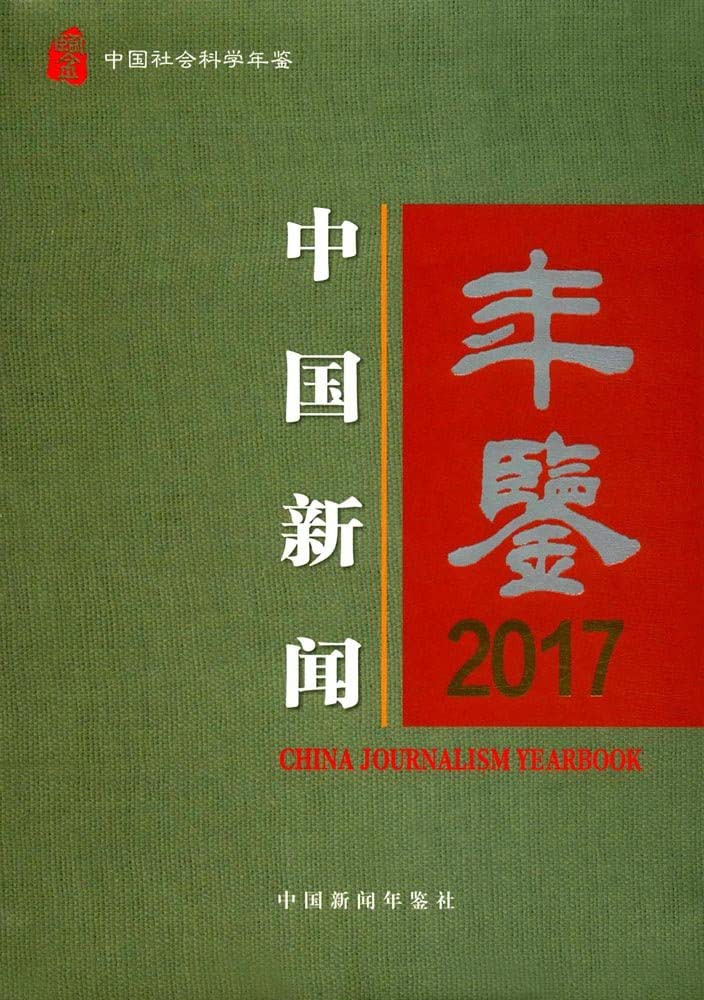
- China Journalism Yearbook, front cover 2017
- Language: Chinese
- Genre: Journalism yearbook
- Publisher: People's Daily Press; China Social Sciences Press; China Journalism Yearbook Press
- Publication date: 1982–present
- Publication place: China

The China Journalism Yearbook (traditional Chinese: 中國新聞年鑑; simplified Chinese: 中国新闻年鉴), also spelled as Chinese Press Almanac or China News Annual or Yearbook of Chinese Journalism, is a large-scale annual statistical yearbook reflecting the basic situation and development of news dissemination industry in the People's Republic of China. It was inaugurated in 1982, and is published one volume annually.

The China Journalism Yearbook, compiled and sponsored by the Journalism and Media of Chinese Academy of Social Sciences (中国社会科学院新闻与传播研究所), records the work performance, major events, reform initiatives, typical experiences, outstanding achievements, institutional settings, and major personnel changes in news, press, radio and television, and online communication industries over the past year of China.

China Journalism Yearbook is mainly published by China Journalism Yearbook Press (中国新闻年鉴社), but its first volume was published by China Social Sciences Press in 1982. And its 1984 volume was published by People's Daily Press.
