= Zhu Hengpeng =

Chinese economist

- Occupation: Economist
- Known for: Deputy director of the Institute of Economics at the Chinese Academy of Social Sciences

Zhu Hengpeng (born 1968/1969) is a Chinese economist, who was deputy director of the Institute of Economics of the Chinese Academy of Social Sciences (CASS) for a decade.

== Biography ==
In 2024, he reportedly criticized Xi Jinping and the state of the Chinese economy in a private chat on WeChat. According to the Wall Street Journal, he was detained and removed from his positions. In September 2024 there were reports that he had not been seen in public since April 2024, when he had spoken at an event organized by the media outlet Caixin. On 6 April 2025, the CASS announced that the Public Policy Research Center of the Institute of Economics, which was headed by Zhu, would close down.
