= He Jiacheng =

Chinese academic and public official

- 何家成

Executive Vice-President of China National School of Administration
- In office March 2013 – October 2014
- President: Yang Jing

Vice-President of China National School of Administration
- In office September 2009 – March 2013
- President: Ma Kai

Personal details
- Born: May 1956 (age 70) Nanjing, Jiangsu, China
- Party: Chinese Communist Party (1981–2015; expelled)
- Education: Nanjing University; Graduate School of Chinese Academy of Social Sciences; John F. Kennedy School of Government

He Jiacheng (Chinese: 何家成; pinyin: Hé Jiāchéng; born May 1956) is a former Chinese academic and public official. Between March 2013 and October 2014 he served as the executive vice president of China National School of Administration. He was dismissed from his position in October 2014, suspected of corruption.

He won the Sun Yefang Economics Prize (孙冶方经济学奖) in 1985 and Chinese Book Award in 1990.

== Early life ==
He was born and raised in Nanjing, Jiangsu. He earned his bachelor of economics degree from Nanjing University in 1981 and received his master of economics degree from Graduate School of Chinese Academy of Social Sciences in 1984. After graduating from Graduate School of Chinese Academy of Social Sciences with a Ph.D. in 1986. He was appointed as the director of Development Economics Research of Chinese Academy of Social Sciences. At the same year, he also was elected a member of All-China Youth Federation. From September 1999 to 2000, he studied at John F. Kennedy School of Government.

== Career ==
From 1986 to 1987, he worked in Information Research Unit of General Office of the Chinese Communist Party. In 1987, he was elected vice-president of China Youth Entrepreneurs Association (中国青年企业家协会).

In 1990, he served as the deputy director of the General Office of the State Department of Materials (国家物资部), and Minister Office Director, China Institute of Economic Research Materials Institute, he remained in that position until 1992, when he was transferred to Wuxi and appointed the Vice-Mayor.

In 1991, he was elected executive vice-president of the Chinese Society of Material Flow (中国物资流通学会). In 1992, he was elected a member of National Youth Standing Committee.

From 1993 to 1995, he worked in State Internal Trade Policy Regime and Regulation Department (国家国内贸易部). In 1994 he was elected vice-president of the China State-owned Assets Management Society (中国国有资产管理学会).

From 1995 to 1998, he worked as president and CPC Party Chief of China Huaxing Group (中国华星集团). In 1997 he was elected vice-president of the China Logistics Association (中国物流协会).

From 1998 to 2000, he was a member and Deputy CPC Party Chief of State Internal Trade Bureau (国家国内贸易局).

From 2000 to 2009, he worked as the chairman of State-owned Large Enterprises Focus (国务院国有重点大型企业监事会). In 2000 he elected chairman of John F. Kennedy School of Government of Chinese Student Association, vice-chairman of China Information Infrastructure, and vice-president of the National Information Technology Committee of Experts. He also is a former guest researcher at Peking University, Tsinghua University, and Chinese Academy of Social Sciences.

In September 2009, he was promoted to become the vice-president of the China National School of Administration, then became the executive vice-president in March 2013.

== Downfall ==
In October 2014, the state media reported that he was being investigated by the Central Commission for Discipline Inspection for "serious violations of laws and regulations". On October 13, 2014, he was removed from office by the Organization Department of the Chinese Communist Party.

On November 11, 2015, He Jiacheng was expelled from the Communist Party. The investigation concluded Yu had gone to private clubs and accepted bribes.

On February 28, 2017, he was sentenced to 9 years in prison for taking bribes by the Intermediate People's Court in Ningbo.
