= Zhou Zumo =

Chinese linguist

Zhou Zumo (simplified Chinese: 周祖谟; traditional Chinese: 周祖謨; pinyin: Zhōu Zǔmó; Wade–Giles: Chou Tsu-mo; in a French form: Tcheou Tsou-mo; November 19, 1914 – January 14, 1995), courtesy name Yansun (燕孙 Yānsūn), was a Chinese linguist regarded as one of the leading phonologists in modern China. He also carried out research in paleography, exegesis, and philology.

== Biography ==
Zhou was a native of Beijing (Peking), with family roots in Hangzhou, Zhejiang province.

In 1932 he entered the Department of Chinese Language and Literature at the National Peking University and studied phonology under Luo Changpei (1899–1958). His graduation thesis was entitled "The Sound System of the Original Yupian (玉篇) within the Tenrei Banshō Meigi (篆隶万象名义)".

During his youth, Zhou attended the elementary and middle schools affiliated with Beijing Normal University. Later, he taught for a considerable period in the Department of Chinese Literature (Guówén xì 国文系) at Fu Jen Catholic University, which at the time was one of the predecessor institutions of the Faculty of Humanities of Beijing Normal University.

In 1936 he passed the entrance examination to the Language Division of the Institute of History and Philology (of Academia Sinica). Even before graduating from Peking University, he was commissioned by this institute to collate the Song edition of the Guangyun (广韵). In 1938, the collated edition, Guangyun jiaoben (广韵校本), was published by the Commercial Press in Beijing.

In 1958 the first volume of Studies on the Development of Rime Categories from the Han to the Southern and Northern Dynasties (Hàn Wèi Jìn Nánběi Cháo yùnbù yǎnbiàn yánjiū 汉魏晋南北朝韵部演变研究), co-authored with Luo Changpei, was published by the Science Press.

In issue no. 7 of the journal Zhongguo Yuwen in 1952, Zhou published the article "Some Problems Concerning the Learning of Chinese by Non-Han Students" (Jiào fēi Hànzú xuéshēng xuéxí Hànyǔ de yīxiē wèntí 教非汉族学生学习汉语的一些问题). This is considered the first academic article on the didactics of teaching Chinese as a foreign language in China.

In particular, his publications on phonology are held in high esteem. The Hanyu da zidian, for example, makes use of Zhou’s publications on Fangyan (方言), Luoyang qielan ji (洛阳伽蓝记, by Yang Xuanzhi), Tang Wudai yunshu jicun (唐五代韵书集存, Extant Rhyme Dictionaries from the Tang and Five Dynasties Periods), and Da Song chongxiu guangyun (大宋重修广韵; abbreviated Guangyun 广韵).

== Publications ==
According to the Research Center for Chinese Poetry, Capital Normal University, his major works include:

- Wènxuéjí (问学集) – collection of studies and essays
- Hàn Wèi Jìn Nánběi Cháo yùnbù yǎnbiàn yánjiū (汉魏晋南北朝韵部演变研究) – study of the development of rime categories from the Han, Wei, and Jin to the Northern and Southern Dynasties
- Guǎngyùn jiàoběn (广韵校本) – collated edition of the Guangyun
- Guǎngyùn jiàoběn Fāngyán jiàojiān (广韵校本方言校笺) – notes on dialects in the collated Guangyun edition
- Luòyáng Qiélán Jì jiāoshì (洛阳伽蓝记校释) – collated and annotated edition of the Luoyang Qielan Ji
- Ěryǎ jiàojiān (尔雅校笺) – collated and annotated edition of the Erya
- Fāngyán jiàojiān (方言校笺) – collated and annotated edition of the Fangyan
- Shìmíng jiàojiān (释名校笺) – collated and annotated edition of the Shiming
- Táng Wǔdài yùnshū jí cún (唐五代韵书集存) – collection of rhyme books from the Tang and Five Dynasties period
- Guǎngyùn sìshēng yùn zì jīn yīn biǎo (广韵四声韵字今音表) – modern pronunciations of rime characters in the four tones of the Guangyun
- Hànyǔ yīnyùn lùnwén jí (汉语音韵论文集) – collection of papers on Chinese phonology
- Hànyǔ cíhuì jiǎnghuà (汉语词汇讲话) – lectures on Chinese vocabulary
- Zhōu Zǔmó xuéshù lùnzhuó zìxuǎn jí (周祖谟学术论著自选集) – selected academic writings of Zhou Zumo
- Zhōu Zǔmó yǔyán wénzì lùnjí (周祖谟语言文字论集) – collection of essays on language and script
- Zhōu Zǔmó yǔyánxué lùnwén jí (周祖谟语言学论文集) – collection of linguistic essays by Zhou Zumo

== See also ==
- Glossary of Historical Chinese Phonology (in German)
