= Chiang Kai-shek diaries =

Private diary of Chiang Kai-shek

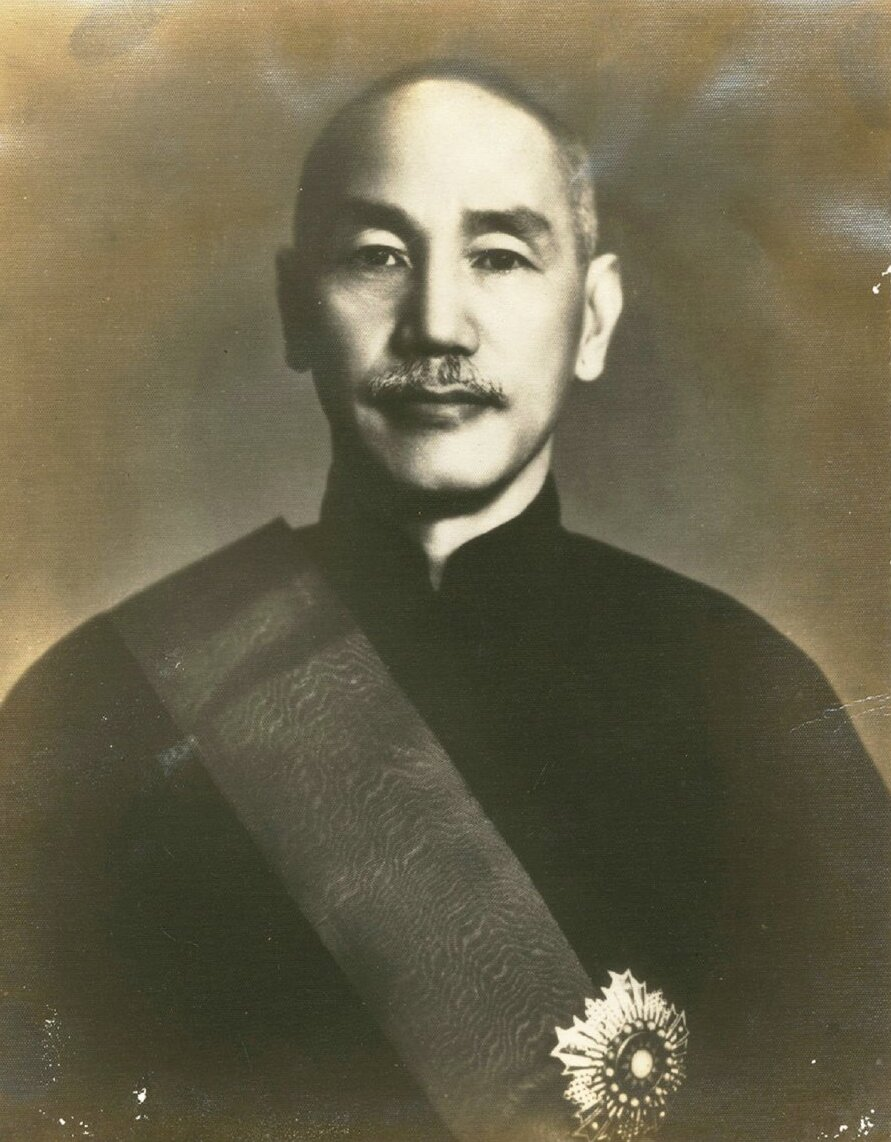
Chiang Kai-shek in 1948

The Chiang Kai-shek diaries (Chinese: 蔣中正日記) contain entries written by Republic of China leader Chiang Kai-shek, spanning from 1915 to 21 July 1972, when he was unable to continue writing due to muscular dystrophy in his hands. Covering a total of 57 years, it is the most complete and detailed diary of any Chinese leader in history. However, the diaries from 1915, 1916, and 1917 were lost during a retreat following an attack by Beiyang Army forces in Yongtai County, Fujian Province, at the end of 1918. Only 13 days of the 1915 diary remain. Chiang later wrote A Brief Account of the Six Preceding Years of the Republic of China to recount his personal history before 1917. Although frequently cited by scholars, this work is not part of the diary. The 1924 diary is believed to have been lost during his time at the Whampoa Military Academy. Both Mainland Chinese and Taiwanese scholars regard this diary as highly authentic and authoritative, challenging the official narratives previously upheld by both the Kuomintang and the Chinese Communist Party.

After Chiang's death, the diary was passed to his son Chiang Ching-kuo for safekeeping. Following Chiang Ching-kuo's death, the diary was entrusted to Chiang Hsiao-yung, and after his passing, it was handed over to Chiang Fang Zhiyi. In late 2004, Chiang Fang Zhiyi entrusted the diary to the Hoover Institution Library and Archives at Stanford University. The Hoover Institution made the diary available to researchers in microform, with a small portion redacted at the request of the Chiang family. This portion is scheduled to be fully disclosed in 2035. On 14 September 2023, following prolonged legal disputes over the diary’s ownership, it was transported from Stanford University to the National Museum of History in Taiwan for preservation.

== Versions ==
There are many versions of the diary:

- Manuscript Version: The original handwritten manuscript.
- Copied Version: A replica created under Chiang Kai-shek's orders, copied exactly from the original. This version spans from 1920 to 1970, but the years 1924, 1948, and 1949 are missing.
- Categorized Copies:

- Type 1: Compiled by Mao Sicheng, who categorized and copied sections of Chiang's diary. During the Cultural Revolution, the Mao family was targeted by the Red Guards, and the documents were discovered hidden within a wall. These eventually ended up in the Second Historical Archives of China in Nanjing.
- Type 2: During the Second Sino-Japanese War, Chiang instructed Wang Yugao and Wang Yuzheng to classify and excerpt his diary into five categories: "Records of Hardships and Efforts", "Self-Reflection Notes", "Study Notes", "Love Notes", and "Travel Notes". The editors supplemented gaps in Chiang's diary with historical materials and polished the text. This version has since been published by the National History Museum.
- Quoted Version: Known as "Draft of Historical Briefs," edited by Sun Yi. This includes Chiang's proclamations and correspondence from 1927 to 1949, alongside selected and refined portions of his diary. Other works citing Chiang's diary also exist but are not listed here.

== History ==
Starting in 1919 and continuing until his illness in 1972, Chiang wrote his diary in notebooks using an ink brush. The original text contained no punctuation, which was added by later generations. However, the sheer volume of the diary makes it a challenging and time-consuming task to interpret.

=== Hoover Institution ===
At the end of 2004, Chiang Fang Zhiyi transferred the original private diaries of Chiang Kai-shek and Chiang Ching-kuo (collectively referred to as the "Two Chiang Diaries") to the Hoover Institution at Stanford University in the United States for temporary storage for 50 years. Elena Danielson, Director of the Hoover Institution Archives, stated that they currently hold over 100 manuscript collections from figures in modern Chinese history, and the Two Chiang Diaries are only temporarily deposited for safekeeping. Guo Daijun, who served as Deputy Director of the First Bureau of the Presidential Office during the Lee Teng-hui administration, had been hired by the Hoover Institution five years earlier. According to Guo, the agreement between the Hoover Institution and the Chiang family specifies that the Two Chiang Diaries are "deposited" at the Hoover Institution, but the institution does not "own" them. There remains the possibility that the diaries may eventually be returned to "Chinese territory.".

On 25 March 2006, Ma Ying-jeou (then Chairman of the Kuomintang) and Chiang Fang Zhiyi visited Stanford University, where the original Chiang Kai-shek diaries (covering 1917 to 1931) were made public for the first time.

The "Modern China Archives and Special Collections" established by the Hoover Institution include materials such as the archives of the Kuomintang, the diaries of the two Chiangs, and the archives of the Chinese Women's Federation. Chen Cheng donated original documents captured during his campaign to suppress the Communist Party in Jiangxi, including those seized from the Communist stronghold in Ruijin, to the Hoover Institution. Chang Kia-ngau, a key figure in the administration of Northeast China during the post-World War II era, also contributed his personal documents to the Hoover Institution. Additionally, T. V. Soong's documents and the diaries of the two Chiangs are now part of the Hoover Institution's collection. Prominent figures such as Hau Pei-tsun (former Premier of the Republic of China), Tang Fei, and Wang Tso-jung (former President of the Control Yuan), along with other senior Kuomintang leaders, have also entrusted their personal documents and archives to the Hoover Institution for safekeeping.

=== Court protection order ===
On 25 September 2013, Stanford University filed a lawsuit regarding Chiang Kai-shek's diaries in the California court where it is located. The university's appointed attorney stated that the purpose of the lawsuit was to request the court to determine whether Chiang's diaries should continue to be held by Stanford University or returned to the descendants of the Chiang family, rather than to adjudicate the ownership of the diaries. Only Chiang Fang Zhiyi had signed an agreement with the university to deposit Chiang's diaries, but the ownership of the diaries belongs collectively to the descendants of the Chiang family. Therefore, the university's current authorization to hold the diaries is incomplete.

The joint heirs to the ownership of Chiang's diaries are: Chiang Hsiao-chang, Chiang Tsai Hui-mei, Chiang Fang Zhiyi, Chiang Yo-mei, Chiang Yo-lan, Chiang Yo-song, Demos Chiang, Chiang Yo-chang, and Chiang Yo-ching.

On 19 June 2020, the Taipei District Court in Taiwan ruled that portions of Chiang Kai-shek's diaries created during his tenure as President constitute state-owned cultural artifacts of the Republic of China and should be managed by the National History Museum. The remaining portions were ruled to be jointly owned by the descendants of the Chiang family.

On 11 July 2023, following a series of legal rulings and a settlement between the National History Museum and the Chiang family, the Federal District Court in San Jose, California, USA, ruled that the ownership of these documents would be transferred to the National History Museum.

=== National History Museum ===
According to the U.S. court ruling on 11 July 2023, Stanford University was required to transfer the complete documents to the National History Museum within 60 days. On 14 September of the same year, 59 boxes of diaries belonging to Chiang Kai-shek and his son, Chiang Ching-kuo, were transported to the National History Museum, Taiwan.

== Influence ==
Lu Fang, a professor in the Department of History at Tunghai University, reported that the diaries provided new insight into Chiang's character and, in turn, enriched the study of the history of the Republic of China. Academic China-Taiwan conferences in the early 2010s discussed Chiang in a human context, rather than as a larger-than-life figure.

Guo Daijun stated that Chiang Kai-shek's diary often includes text analyzing current international affairs as well as newspaper clippings. Chiang’s diary demonstrates that he had a broad perspective, often approaching problems from multiple angles, which contributed to his accomplishments. His diary also describes the tragic scenes of ruined farmhouses and displaced people, expressing his heartbreak for those suffering in dire circumstances. He was deeply concerned with national issues—not only military affairs but also the livelihoods of the people.

Yang Tianshi, a researcher at the Institute of Modern History of the Chinese Academy of Social Sciences, noted that Chiang Kai-shek's diary, spanning over 50 years, provides valuable insights into his inner world and many unknown historical secrets. The diary was primarily written for Chiang's personal use rather than for posterity. It is characterized by its authenticity and expressiveness, serving as a tool for memoranda, organizing work and life, moral self-cultivation, summarizing life experiences, or venting emotions.
