= Qiance =

Archeological term

Qiance, i.e., qiǎncè (Chinese traditional: 遣冊; Chinese simplified: 遣册), is a term for funerary-furnishing inventory list documents excavated from Chinese archaeological sites.

== Description ==
Qiance were usually written on bamboo and wooden slips. According to Professor Qiu Xigui of Fudan University, most of the bamboo and wooden slips unearthed from ancient tombs and frontier fortress sites in China are ancient books and qiance. According to archaeological discoveries and ancient textual evidence, scholars believe that shorter funerary inventory lists, usually with less than one hundred item names, were written on fengfang, a wooden tablet, instead.

== Purpose ==
It has been argued that qiance, together with the other tomb objects, were meant to guarantee the tomb owner's social status in the world beyond.
