= David Daokui Li =

Chinese economist (born 1963)

Li Daokui
- 李稻葵
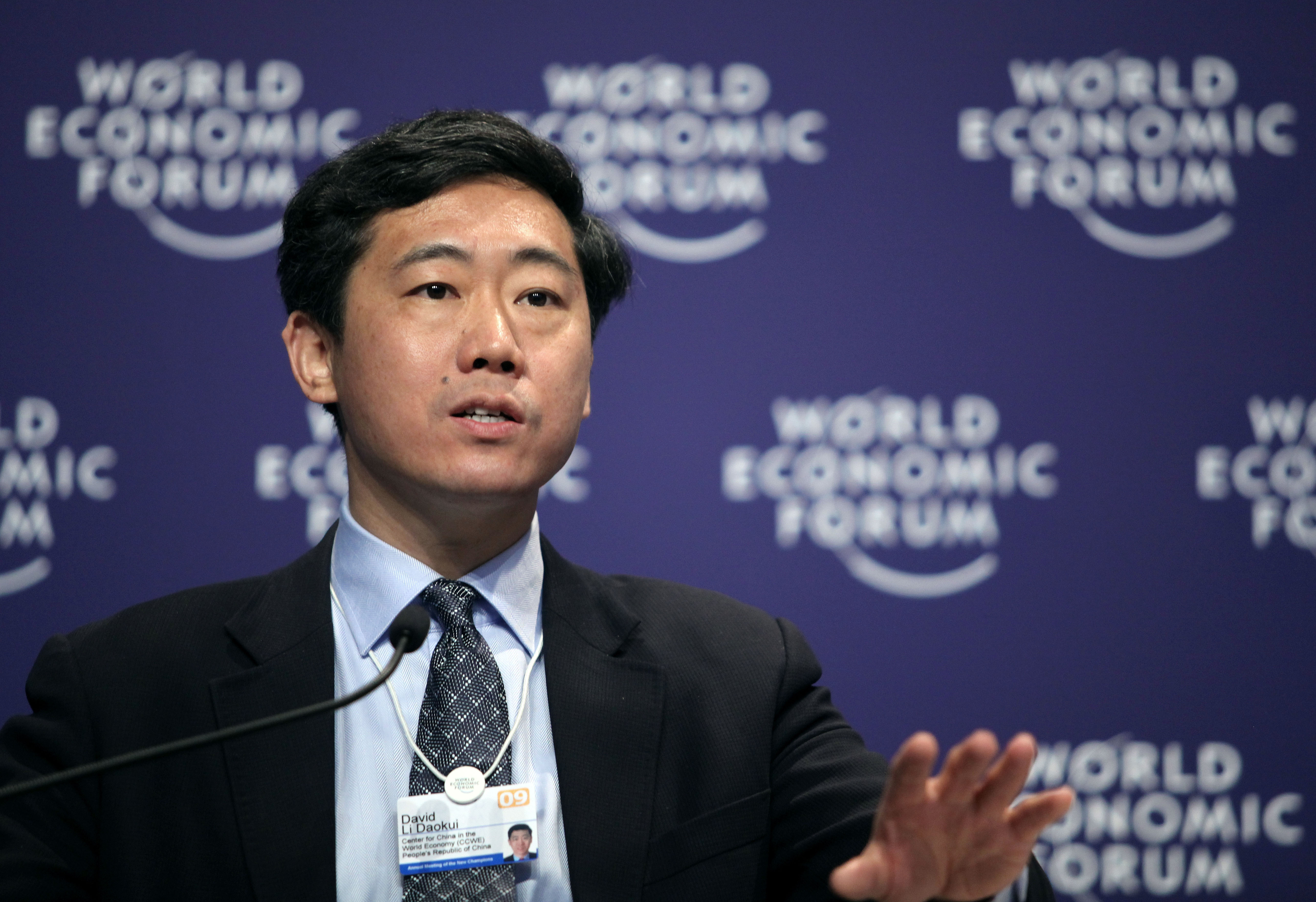
- Born: December 22, 1963 (age 62); Beijing, China
- Education: Harvard University (PhD - Economics)

Li Daokui (Chinese: 李稻葵; pinyin: Lǐ Dàokúi; born 22 December 1963) is a Chinese economist and the Mansfield Freeman Professor of Economics and director of the Center for China in the World Economy (CCWE) at Tsinghua University's School of Economics and Management, where he teaches courses on economic transition, corporate finance, international economics, and China's economy. In 2013, Li was appointed the founding dean of the Schwarzman Scholars program at Tsinghua University.

Li Daokui is a part of an academic trio that replaced Fan Gang to the Monetary Policy Committee of the People's Bank of China (PBOC), China's central bank. He is a former member of the Chinese People's Political Consultative Conference (CPPCC). He is the author of China's World View: Demystifying China to Prevent Global Conflict.

== Career ==
Li has held numerous positions in academia. These include a visiting scholarship at the Center for International Development (CID) of the Harvard Kennedy School (1986), assistant professor at the University of Michigan-Ann Arbor, research fellow at the Hoover Institute of Stanford University, and professor and deputy director of the Economic Development Research Center of Hong Kong University of Science and Technology.

Li has also served as the editor for the Journal of Comparative Economics from 2000 to 2003 and the Economics Bulletin. He returned to China in 2004 to teach at his alma mater, Tsinghua, and to serve as head of the Center for China in the World Economy research center.

From 2016 to 2018, Li was a member of the monetary policy committee of China's central bank. He was succeeded by Dingo Xu on the board of JD.com in 2018.

In August 2020, Li stated China could restrict exports of medicine to the U.S. in response to American technology export restrictions on China.

In 2023, a study by Li concluded that local government debt in China was 50% higher than previously estimated by the IMF and World Bank. The study found that the majority of debts were for infrastructure, and the level of debt was unsustainable without central government support.
