= Institute of Economics, Chinese Academy of Social Sciences =

Chinese government research institute

- 中国社会科学院经济研究所
- Formation: 1929; 97 years ago
- Type: National-level academic research institution on economic studies
- Headquarters: No. 2 Yuetan North Street, Xicheng District, Beijing
- Director: Gao Peiyong
- Parent organization: Chinese Academy of Social Sciences
- Website: ie.cass.cn

Institute of Economics, Chinese Academy of Social Sciences
- Simplified Chinese: 中国社会科学院经济研究所
- Traditional Chinese: 中國社會科學院經濟研究所
Transcriptions
Standard Mandarin
- Hanyu Pinyin: Zhōngguó Shèhuì Kēxuéyuàn Jīngjì Yánjiūsuǒ

The Institute of Economics, Chinese Academy of Social Sciences is an institute under the Chinese Academy of Social Sciences that conducts research economics.

== History ==
In 1929, the Social Survey Department of the China Education and Culture Foundation was reorganized into the Institute of Social Survey. In 1934, it was merged with the Institute of Social Sciences of the Academia Sinica to form the Institute of Social Sciences of the Academia Sinica. In 1945, it was renamed the Institute of Social Sciences of the Academia Sinica. In 1950, it was renamed the Institute of Social Sciences of the Chinese Academy of Sciences. In 1953, it was renamed the Institute of Economics of the Chinese Academy of Sciences. In 1977, it was renamed the Institute of Economics of the Chinese Academy of Social Sciences.

As of July 2017, there were 141 people employed in the economy.

In 2024, The Wall Street Journal reported that a deputy director of the Institute of Economics, Zhu Hengpeng, was detained and removed from his position after criticizing Xi Jinping's management of the national economy in a private WeChat group. On 6 April 2025, the CASS announced that the Public Policy Research Center of the Institute of Economics, which was headed by Zhu, would close down.
