= Han Zhiran =

Chinese politician

- 韩志然

Member of the Standing Committee of the 12th Chinese People's Political Consultative Conference
- In office March 2013 – June 2015
- Chairman: Yu Zhengsheng

Vice-Chairman of the Inner Mongolia Autonomous Region of the Chinese People's Political Consultative Conference
- In office February 2012 – June 2015

Communist Party Secretary of Hohhot
- In office September 2004 – December 2011
- Preceded by: Niu Yuru (牛玉儒)
- Succeeded by: Nashun Menghe (那顺孟和)

Communist Party Secretary of Ulanqab
- In office January 2003 – September 2004
- Preceded by: Han Zhenxiang (韩振祥)
- Succeeded by: Wu Yongxin (吴永新)

Mayor of Baotou
- In office September 2001 – January 2003
- Preceded by: Niu Yuru
- Succeeded by: Su Qing (苏青)

Personal details
- Born: February 1952 (age 74) Naiman Banner, Tongliao, Inner Mongolia, China
- Party: Chinese Communist Party
- Education: Gansu Agricultural University; Chinese Academy of Social Sciences; Central Party School of the Chinese Communist Party

Han Zhiran (simplified Chinese: 韩志然; traditional Chinese: 韓志然; pinyin: Hán Zhìrán; born February 1952) is a Chinese politician who spent most of his career in north China's Inner Mongolia Autonomous Region. At the height of his career, he served as vice-chairman of the Inner Mongolia Autonomous Region of the Chinese People's Political Consultative Conference (CPPCC). He was a delegate to the 10th National People's Congress. He was a Standing Committee member of the 12th Chinese People's Political Consultative Conference. He was investigated by the Chinese Communist Party's anti-graft agency in June 2015. Then he was placed on two-year probation within the Party and was demoted to less responsible jobs.

== Biography ==
Han was born in Naiman Banner, Tongliao, Inner Mongolia in February 1952. He graduated from Gansu Agricultural University. He entered the workforce in June 1976, and joined the Chinese Communist Party in March 1978. He spent 10 years working at Bairin Left Banner before serving as deputy party chief and magistrate of Ar Horqin Banner. He became vice-mayor of Chifeng in March 1989, and was re-elected in February 1990. He was elevated to deputy party chief and mayor of Bayannur in January 1995, and held that offices until April 1998. In April 1998, he was appointed secretary-general of Inner Mongolia, he remained in that position until September 2001, when he was transferred to Baotou and appointed deputy party chief and mayor. During his term in office, he accompanied Yun Bulong, the then Chairman of Inner Mongolia Autonomous Region, to inspect the Xilingol League's sandstorm prevention work, but Yun Bulong was killed in a traffic accident. He became party chief of Ulanqab in January 2003, and served until September 2004, then he was transferred to Hohhot, capital of Inner Mongolia Autonomous Region, as party chief, the top political position in the city. In this position, he made great efforts to promote urban construction. In February 2012 he was promoted again to become vice-chairman of the Inner Mongolia Autonomous Region of the Chinese People's Political Consultative Conference (CPPCC). In March 2013, he was elected a Standing Committee member of the 12th Chinese People's Political Consultative Conference.

On June 17, 2015, he was removed from membership of China's top political advisory body, the Chinese People's Political Consultative Conference, at the 11th Session of the Standing Committee of the 12th National Committee of the Chinese People's Political Consultative Conference. On June 23, he has been stripped of his post. Then he was placed on two-year probation within the Party (留党察看二年) and was downgraded to deputy department director level (副厅级).

Government offices
Preceded by Niu Yuru (牛玉儒)	Mayor of Baotou; 2001–2003	Succeeded by Su Qing (苏青)
Party political offices
Preceded by Han Zhenxiang (韩振祥)	Communist Party Secretary of Ulanqab; 2003–2004	Succeeded by Wu Yongxin (吴永新)
Preceded by Niu Yuru (牛玉儒)	Communist Party Secretary of Hohhot; 2004–2011	Succeeded by Nashun Menghe (那顺孟和)
