= Zhongguo Yuwen (journal) =

Zhongguo Yuwen (simplified Chinese: 中国语文; traditional Chinese: 中國語文; pinyin: Zhōngguó Yǔwén; lit. 'Chinese Language'), also called "Studies of the Chinese Language", is a bimonthly academic journal published by the Commercial Press in the People's Republic of China. It was founded in 1952 and is hosted by the Institute of Linguistics of the Chinese Academy of Social Sciences. Zhongguo Yuwen is a top journal in linguistics in China.

== History ==
In 1952, Zhongguo Yuwen was founded as a monthly journal jointly by the Chinese Character Reform Committee and the Institute of Linguistics of the Chinese Academy of Social Sciences.

In 1956, the editorial work started to be solely undertaken by the Institute of Linguistics.

In 1963, the journal turned bimonthly.

During the Cultural Revolution (July 1966 - April 1978), the journal was suspended.

In May 1978, Zhongguo Yuwen resumed publication.

In 2014, the journal became one of the first academic journals endorsed by the former State Administration of Press, Publication, Radio, Film and Television.

== Coverage ==
The research papers published by Zhongguo Yuwen covers various aspects of Chinese linguistics, including Chinese historical linguistics, cross-linguistic studies, comparative studies on Chinese dialects, applied linguistics, sociolinguistics, language acquisition, Chinese language information processing, language policy, etc.

== Contribution ==
Many important academic achievements in Chinese linguistics have been firstly published in Zhongguo Yuwen, and have made far-reaching influences on the development of Chinese language studies. According to CNKI, the performances of the journal include:

Number of published articles: 3762

Total downloads: 3686796

Total citations: 108995

Evaluation information (2024 edition) Composite impact factor: 1.292

(2024 edition) Comprehensive impact factor: 0.767

== Ranking ==
Zhongguo Yuwen is among the Chinese Social Sciences Citation Index (CSSCI, 2021-2022) Source Journals and the Peking University "Overview of Chinese Core Journals" Source Journals.

In the "Chinese Humanities and Social Sciences Journal AMI Comprehensive Evaluation Report", Zhongguo Yuwen is ranked class "authority" at the 2018 edition, and "top" at the 2022 edition.

== Editorial office ==
Correspondence address: No. 5 Jianguomennei Street, Beijing

Tel: 010-85195391 010-65125849

E-mail: zgyw_yys@cass.org.cn

ISSN 0578-1949 CN 11-1053/H

Editor-in-Chief: WANG Feng

Associate Editors: LIU Xiangbo, CHEN Li

== See also ==
- Institute of Linguistics (CASS)
- Chinese Language Society
