= Ji Xianlin =

Chinese academic

- 季羨林
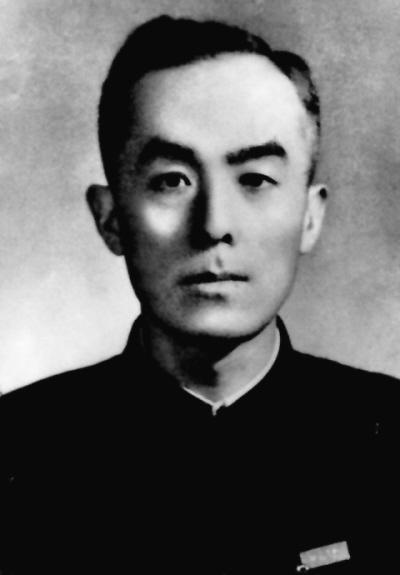
- Ji Xianlin in 1952
- Born: August 6, 1911; Linqing, Shandong, China
- Died: July 11, 2009 (aged 97); Beijing, People's Republic of China
- Occupations: linguist, paleographer, historian, writer
- Children: Ji Wanru, Ji Cheng

Ji Xianlin (Chinese: 季羨林; pinyin: Jì Xiànlín; August 6, 1911 – July 11, 2009) was a Chinese Indologist, linguist, paleographer, historian and writer who has been honored by the governments of both India and China. Ji was proficient in many languages including Chinese, Sanskrit, Arabic, English, German, French, Russian, Pali and Tocharian, and translated many works. He published a memoir, The Cowshed: Memories of the Chinese Cultural Revolution, about his persecution during the Cultural Revolution.

== Biography ==
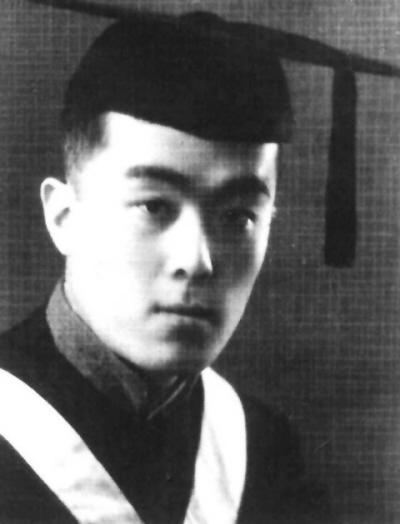
Ji Xianlin at his graduation from Tsinghua University in 1934

He was born in Linqing, Shandong in 1911. He attended Sanhejie Primary School and the No. 1 Middle School in Jinan, then Shandong University. In 1930, he was admitted to Tsinghua University as a major in Western literature. In 1935, he went to University of Göttingen as an exchange student, choosing in 1936 to major in Sanskrit and less well known ancient languages, such as Pali, under Professor Ernst Waldschmidt.

Ji received his PhD in 1941, and then studied Tocharian under Emil Sieg. In 1946, he returned to China, becoming a professor at Peking University under the recommendation of Chen Yinke, and began a long career as one of China's most well-known scholars of ancient Indian languages and culture.

During his career, Ji made discoveries about Buddhism's migration from India to China, and mundane cultural changes such as the spread of paper from China to India.

Ji was the founding director of the Department of Eastern Languages at Peking University. He became dean of the department and pioneered the field of Eastern studies in China, authoring 40 articles and 13 academic papers in the next three years. In 1956, he was elected commissioner of the Chinese Academy of Sciences' Department of Social Science. Before he was actually persecuted himself, Ji had "joined the Party in the 1950s and actively participated in the ceaseless campaigns," which including suppressing and denouncing intellectuals who espoused views that ran counter to the Communist Party.

During the Cultural Revolution (1966–1976), he secretly translated the Ramayana from Sanskrit into Chinese retaining the poetic format, risking the punishment which befell those convicted as "intellectuals".

In 1978, Ji became vice president of Peking University and director of the Chinese Academy of Science's Research Institute on South Asia. He also served as chairman of various professional organizations, including the Chinese Foreign Literature Association, the Chinese South Asian Association and the Chinese Language Society. During this period of his career, Ji published 11 academic books and over 200 papers in more than ten academic fields, including Chinese cultural research, comparative literature, and Sanskrit.

In 1998, he published a translation and analysis of fragments of a Tocharian Maitreyasamiti-Nataka discovered in 1974 in Yanqi.

In addition to his translation of the Ramayana, Ji wrote seven books, including a short history of India and a history of Chinese cane sugar. The Ji Xianlin Collection consists of 24 volumes containing articles on ancient Indian languages, Sino-Indian cultural relations, Buddhism, comparative and folk literature, essays, translations of literary works, and more.

Despite deteriorating health and eyesight, Ji continued to work. In the summer of 2002, he was hospitalized for a dermatological condition. He died on July 11, 2009, in the No. 301 Hospital, Beijing. His son, Ji Cheng, said that Ji died of a heart attack.

== Cultural work ==
Ji maintained that "Cultural exchange is the main drive for humankind's progress. Only by learning from each other's strong points to make up for shortcomings can people constantly progress, the ultimate target of which is to achieve a kind of Great Harmony."

Ji's philosophy divides human culture into four parts: an Eastern group consisting of Chinese, Indian, and Arabic–Islamic culture, and Western culture, consisting of European–American culture. He advocated a greater degree of cultural exchange between East and West, in order to rejuvenate both cultures, and from the mid-1990s, he actively participated in discussions on the cultural problems between the East and West, based on the same ideology. This differs from the Eurocentrism predominant in China, as elsewhere.

He is quoted as saying,

The river of Chinese civilization has kept alternating between rising and falling, but it has never dried up, because there was always fresh water flowing into it. It has over history been joined by fresh water many times, the two largest inflows coming from India and the West, both of which owed their success to translation. It is translation that has preserved the perpetual youth of Chinese civilization. Translation is hugely useful!

Ji cultivated the appearance of a farmer or worker rather than a scholar, wearing bleached khaki suits and cloth shoes, and carrying an old leather schoolbag; he is also similarly reputed as treating people of all walks of life with equal respect and sincerity. He has opined that the meaning of life lies in work, and he avoided distractions which would have detracted from his working time; in order to do one's work, however, he believed that one must stay healthy, so he exercised for his health. He is reported as having got up at 4:30 am, breakfasting at 5:00 am, and then beginning to write. He once said that he often felt compelled to get up at this early hour to work. Nevertheless, he wrote with great speed and efficiency, completing his famous essay "Forever Regret" within a few hours.

Often cited as fearless in his pursuit of academic truth, shown not only by daring to translate Ramayana during the Cultural Revolution, but also by his 1986 article, written against the advice of his friends, "A Few Words for Hu Shih", who at that time was in disrepute and whose work was shunned by most scholars. Ji, however, felt that academic progress required acknowledging not only Hu Shih's mistakes, but also his contributions to modern Chinese literature. His article was sufficiently convincing to many scholars that it caused a re-evaluation of the development of modern Chinese literature and the role of Hu Shih.

== Memoir ==
In 1998, Ji published a book about his experiences during the Cultural Revolution, titled The Cowshed: Memories of the Chinese Cultural Revolution. According to Ji, he had refrained from publishing the memoir earlier because he did not want to take revenge on those who persecuted him, but was disturbed by what he viewed as the failure of his generation to express guilt or remorse for the violence of the Cultural Revolution. The book, published by a state press, gained great popularity in China and a widespread readership. Ji limited himself to his own experiences, suffering, and guilt during the period, and refrained from speculating on the broader political context of the Communist Party's mass campaign, or the role of Mao Zedong in it. The book was translated into English by Jiang Chenxin in 2016 and published by The New York Review of Books.

During the Cultural Revolution, Ji was denounced by Nie Yuanzi, the militant leader of Peking University's Red Guards, as a "hidden counterrevolutionary". Ji was betrayed by students and colleagues, hauled through screaming rallies where he was beaten and spat upon, and was forced to move bricks around morning to night. Attempts he made to commit suicide were changed at the last minute. Ji was sent to a "cowshed", a makeshift prison on the university campus, for nine months.

== Awards and legacy ==
On Ji's 94th birthday, August 6, 2005, the China Confucius Foundation opened the Ji Xianlin Research Institute in Beijing, as a special institution for the research on The Studies of Ji Xianlin, with notable scholars such as Tang Yijie, Le Daiyun, and Liu Mengxi as senior consultants.

In 2006, Ji received a lifetime achievement award from the government of China for his contributions to the field of translation; accepting the award, he stated: "The reason our Chinese culture has been able to remain consistent and rich throughout its 5,000 years of history is closely linked to translation. Translations from other cultures have helped infuse new blood into our culture".

On January 26, 2008, the government of India announced that Ji had been awarded the Padma Bhushan, the first time it was awarded to a Chinese person. According to Xu Keqiao, an expert on Sino-Indian cultural communication at the Chinese Academy of Social Sciences, "A lot of what Chinese know about India's tradition and culture has come from Ji. He translated from the original Sanskrit and rendered them in poetry in Chinese. It is a tremendous achievement covering most of his life." This has been cited as an example of growing friendship between the two nations. Indian External Affairs Minister Pranab Mukherjee personally presented the Padma Bhushan to Ji on June 6, 2008. Mukherjee paid a visit to the ailing 97-year-old Ji, who is the first Chinese to receive the honour, at a military hospital where he has been staying and presented the medallion and award certificate.

Ji was a patriot, and is quoted saying "Even when I am burned down to ashes, my love for China will not change." As a student at Tsinghua University, he signed a petition to Chiang Kai-shek to oppose the Japanese invaders in Nanjing. As an impoverished but brilliant student, he said, "I haven't disgraced my country; my scores are the only comfort that I can give to my motherland."

Ji was also highly regarded for his moral values, character, and personality. Chinese premier Wen Jiabao is reported to have told Indian Prime Minister Manmohan Singh that Ji was his mentor.
