= Qiu Xigui =

Chinese historian and paleographer (1935–2025)

Qiu Xigui; 裘锡圭
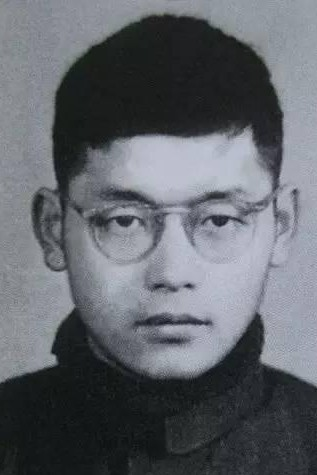
- Born: 13 July 1935; Shanghai, China
- Died: 8 May 2025 (aged 89); Shanghai, China
- Education: Fudan University
- Known for: Chinese Writing; Collected Papers on Palaeography
- Scientific career
- Fields: Ancient Chinese history, palaeography, graphemics
- Workplaces: Peking University; Fudan University

Qiu Xigui (simplified Chinese: 裘锡圭; traditional Chinese: 裘錫圭; Wade–Giles: Ch'iu Hsi-kuei; 13 July 1935 – 8 May 2025) was a Chinese historian, palaeographer and professor of Fudan University. His book Chinese Writing is considered the "single most influential study of Chinese palaeography".

== Early life and education ==
Qiu Xigui was born in July 1935 in Shanghai, of Ningbo ancestry. In 1952, he was admitted to the history department of Fudan University and was interested in pre- Qin dynasty Chinese history. Under the influence of the renowned oracle bone expert Hu Houxuan, he took interest in the oracle bones and Chinese bronze inscriptions. After graduating in 1956, he became a graduate student of oracle bones and Shang dynasty history, studying under Professor Hu. The same year, Hu was transferred to the Institute of History of the Chinese Academy of Sciences in Beijing, and Qiu followed Hu to the institute.

== Career ==
After finishing his graduate studies in 1960, Qiu was assigned to be a teaching assistant in the Department of Chinese of Peking University (PKU). From 1964 to 1966, Qiu, like many other intellectuals, was sent down to the countryside to be "reeducated by peasants" as part of Mao's Socialist Education Movement. He was sent to Jiangling County, Hubei and Yanqing County, Beijing. During the subsequent Cultural Revolution, he worked as a labourer at a farm in Jiangxi province from 1969 to 1971.

In 1972, Qiu participated in the study of Han dynasty documents excavated from Mawangdui, under the leadership of Zhu Dexi. From 1974 to 1976, he worked under Zhu at the Wenwu (Cultural Relics) Publishing House, where they researched the Yinqueshan Han Slips and other excavated bamboo and wooden slips. He became an associate professor at PKU in 1978 and a full professor in 1983.

From 1982 to 1983, Qiu taught Chinese palaeography at University of Washington in Seattle as a visiting scholar. From February to July 1998, he gave lectures on palaeography and ancient literature at the Chinese department of National Tsing Hua University in Taiwan. In November 2000, he was awarded an honorary doctorate by the University of Chicago.

In 2005, Qiu returned to his alma mater Fudan University to lead its Center for Research on Chinese Excavated Classics and Palaeography.

== Death ==
Qiu died in Shanghai on 8 May 2025, at the age of 89.

== Publications ==
Much of Qiu's research findings were published in his 1988 book "Chinese Writing" (文字学概要). According to American sinologist Edward L. Shaughnessy, the book is the "single most influential study of Chinese palaeography", and "universally acclaimed to be the definitive overview" of the field. It was translated into English by Gilbert L. Mattos and Jerry Norman, two leading Western scholars of Chinese linguistics, and published in 2000 under the title Chinese Writing.

As of 2002, Qiu had published about 300 academic papers, some of which were included in his 1992 book "Collected Papers on Palaeography" (古文字论集). In 2012, the Collected Works of Qiu Xigui (裘锡圭学术文集), comprising six volumes and three million characters, was published by Fudan University Press.
