= Huang Baosheng =

Chinese scholar (1942–2023)

Huang Baosheng (Chinese: 黄宝生; July 1942 – 23 March 2023) was a Chinese scholar of Sanskrit and Pali. He is known for having translated into Chinese many Sanskrit and Pali texts, including the Mahabharata, the Bhagavad Gita, the Upanishads, the Lalitavistara Sutra and the Vajracchedikā (Diamond Sutra).

Huang was born in Shanghai in July 1942, and graduated from the department of oriental languages at Peking University in 1965, majoring in foreign languages (Sanskrit and Pali). He retired from Peking University and was a researcher at the Institute of Foreign Literature in the Graduate School of Chinese Academy of Social Sciences (CASS). He was also the president of the China Foreign Literature Society and of the Indian Literature Research Institute, and a member of the Chinese Communist Party.

A project to translate the Mahabharata into Chinese was started in 1989, by Jin Kemu (1912-2000) and Zhao Guohwa (1943-1991), who with Xi Bizhuang published the translation of the first parva in 1993. This project was resumed in 1996 under the leadership of Huang Baosheng, who was then Director of the Institute of Foreign Literature Studies at CASS. The 5-member team (Huang Baosheng, Guo Liangyun, Li Nan and Ge Weijun from CASS, and Duan Qing from Peking University) completed the translation of all 18 parvas in 2002–03, running into "millions of words". After further revisions by Huang and proofreading, it was published in six volumes in December 2005 by the Chinese Social Science Publishing House in Beijing. It won him an award from the Chinese government, and was sold out and had to be reprinted.

Huang died on 23 March 2023, at the age of 80.

== Selected publications ==
- Yindu gudian shixue (Classical Poetics of India), Beijing: Peking University Press, 1999

== Awards ==
- 1986, "Young and Mid-aged Expert with Outstanding Contribution"
- 2011, President's Certificate of Honour, Rashtriya Sanskrit Sansthan, India
- 2015, Padma Shri, India's fourth highest civilian honour.
