= Huang Xiaoxiang =

Chinese politician

- 黄小祥

Deputy Secretary General of the Chinese People's Political Consultative Conference
- In office March 2013 – July 2015

Vice-President of the All-China Federation of Industry and Commerce
- In office March 2013 – July 2015
- President: Wang Qinmin

Vice-Governor of Sichuan
- In office January 2002 – February 2012
- Governor: Zhang Zhongwei

Communist Party Secretary of Neijiang
- In office February 1999 – January 2002
- Preceded by: Yang Zhiwen
- Succeeded by: Zeng Shengquan

Personal details
- Born: June 1956 (age 70) Dazu District, Chongqing, China
- Party: Chinese Communist Party
- Education: Sichuan University; Southwestern University of Finance and Economics; Graduate School of Chinese Academy of Social Sciences

Chinese name
- Traditional Chinese: 黃小祥
- Simplified Chinese: 黄小祥
Transcriptions
Standard Mandarin
- Hanyu Pinyin: Huáng Xiǎoxiáng

Huang Xiaoxiang (Chinese: 黄小祥; born June 1956) is a former Chinese politician who spent his career in Sichuan and Beijing. As of July 2015, he has been removed from his posts, as the party's internal disciplinary body investigated Huang for corruption. Previously he served as deputy secretary general of the Chinese People's Political Consultative Conference and vice-president of the All-China Federation of Industry and Commerce.

Huang was a member of the 10th and 11th National People's Congress and the 12th national committee of Chinese People's Political Consultative Conference. Chinese media reported that he had close relations with Zhou Yongkang, who was a member of the 17th Politburo Standing Committee (PSC), China's highest decision-making body, and the Secretary of the Central Political and Legal Affairs Commission (Zhengfawei) between 2007 and 2012.

== Biography ==
Huang was born in Dazu District of Chongqing, in June 1956. During the Cultural Revolution, he worked as a sent-down youth in Xichang County, Sichuan. In October 1978, he was accepted to Sichuan University, where he majored in economics. Then he studied and later taught at Southwestern University of Finance and Economics. From February 1986 to December 1988 he was a doctoral candidate at the Graduate School of Chinese Academy of Social Sciences.

Huang began his political career in August 1974, and joined the Chinese Communist Party in November 1984.

Beginning in December 1988, he served in several posts in the State Council of the People's Republic of China, including deputy director, director, and investigator.

In March 1994 he became the chief economic manager of China Huatong Group Products, a state-owned enterprise. Nine months later, he was promoted to the vice president position.

In August 1995, he was appointed the deputy secretary general of Sichuan, he remained in that position until February 1999, when he was transferred to Neijiang and appointed the Chinese Communist Party Committee Secretary.

He was promoted to become the vice-governor of Sichuan in January 2002, and served until February 2012.

In March 2013, he was appointed vice-president of the All-China Federation of Industry and Commerce and deputy secretary general of the Chinese People's Political Consultative Conference.

On 17 July 2015, he was removed from his posts on the Thirty-second session of the 12th National Committee of the CPPCC National Committee.

Party political offices
Preceded by Yang Zhiwen	Communist Party Secretary of Neijiang; 1999–2002	Succeeded by Zeng Shengquan
