= Academy of Marxism =

Institute of the Chinese Academy of Social Sciences

Academy of Marxism, Chinese Academy of Social Sciences
- 中国社会科学院马克思主义研究院
- Formation: December 26, 2005; 20 years ago
- Type: National-level academic research institution on Marxism studies
- Headquarters: No. 5 Jianguomennei Street, Beijing
- Director: Cheng Enfu
- Parent organization: Chinese Academy of Social Sciences
- Website: marxism.cass.cn

Academy of Marxism, Chinese Academy of Social Sciences
- Simplified Chinese: 中国社会科学院马克思主义研究院
- Traditional Chinese: 中國社會科學院馬克思主義研究院
Transcriptions
Standard Mandarin
- Hanyu Pinyin: Zhōngguó Shèhuì Kēxuéyuàn Mǎkèsīzhǔyì Yánjiùyuàn

The Academy of Marxism, Chinese Academy of Social Sciences is an institute under the Chinese Academy of Social Sciences that conducts research on Marxism.

== History ==
It was previously known as the Institute of Marxism–Leninism and Mao Zedong Thought. It was renamed and rebuilt on May 19, 2005, at the meeting of the Politburo Standing Committee of the Chinese Communist Party. It was officially established on December 26, 2005 (the 112th anniversary of Mao Zedong's birth).

== Functions ==
At present, the Institute's "primary task" is to "study, research, interpret and publicize Xi Jinping Thought on Socialism with Chinese Characteristics for a New Era".

== Organization ==
Currently, the Academy of Marxism consists of 5 research departments and 18 research laboratories:

Research Institutions of the Institute of Marxism of the Chinese Academy of Social Sciences
Research Department	Xi Jinping Thought on Socialism with Chinese Characteristics for a New Era	Principles of Marxism	Sinicization of Marxism	International Communist Movement	Foreign Marxism
Research Room	Basic theory; Basic strategy; Party Building and History; Ideology and social trends	Marxist philosophy; Marxist Political Economy; Scientific Socialism; History of the Development of Marxism	Mao Zedong Thought; Theoretical System of Socialism with Chinese Characteristics; Marxist Atheism; Ideological and political education	History of the International Communist Movement; Contemporary World Socialism; Contemporary World Capitalism	Foreign left-wing thought; Foreign Communist Party Theory; Western Marxism

== Publications ==
The Academy of Marxism publishes Studies in Marxism, Studies in World Socialism, Trends in World Socialist Studies, Science and Atheism, International Critical Thought (English), World Review of Political Economy (English), Marxist Abstracts, Yearbook of Marxist Theoretical Research and Discipline Construction.
