= China Social Sciences Press =

State-owned publishing house in China

China Social Sciences Press 中国社会科学出版社
- Status: Active
- Founded: 14 June 1978
- Headquarters location: Beijing, China
- Publication types: humanities and social sciences academic works
- Owner: Chinese Academy of Social Sciences
- Official website: www.csspw.cn

China Social Sciences Press (CSSP, Chinese: 中国社会科学出版社) is a Chinese state-level publishing house sponsored and managed by the Chinese Academy of Social Sciences, which publishes academic works in the humanities and social sciences.

== History ==
China Social Sciences Press was proposed by Hu Qiaomu and officially established on 14 June 1978 after the instructions of Deng Xiaoping, Li Xiannian, Hua Guofeng and others of the Central Committee of the Chinese Communist Party.

In October 2020, the United States Department of State designated China Social Sciences Press as a foreign mission of China.

== See also ==
- Academic publishing in China
- China Science Publishing & Media
- Science and technology in the People's Republic of China
