= Zhu Dexi =

Chinese linguist and educator

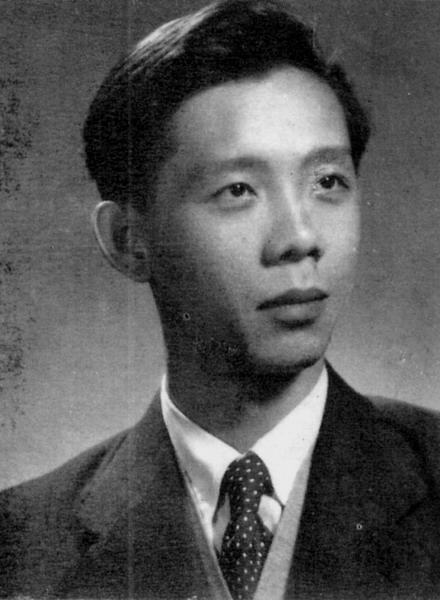
Zhu Dexi

Zhu Dexi (Chinese: 朱德熙; pinyin: Zhū Déxī; 1920–1992) was a Chinese linguist, grammarian, and educator. He was vice-president of Peking University and made significant contributions to Modern Chinese and Teaching Chinese as a Foreign Language.

== Early life and education ==
Zhu Dexi was born into a wealthy family of senior officials in the Ministry of Finance in Nanjing that was of Suzhounese descent. At an early age, he memorized classics of ancient poetry. From the age of 11 or 12, he read classic novels. In middle school, he participated in the December 9th Movement.

In 1939, with a good foundation in math and English, he was admitted to the National Southwestern Associated University at first in the physics department, but a year later transferred to the Chinese department where he was taught by Tang Lan, Wen Yiduo, Chen Mengjia, and Luo Changpei.

== Career ==
After graduation, he began teaching at l'Université Franco-chinoise de Kunming (Chinese: 昆明中法大学) in 1945 and joined the China Democratic League. He took a post teaching in the Chinese department of Tsinghua University in 1946 and in 1952 was promoted to adjunct professor. He began teaching at Peking University the same year. From 1953 to 1955, he taught Chinese at Sofia University in Bulgaria, the first professor of Chinese to teach abroad. After returning to China, he continued teaching at Peking University where he was promoted to professor in 1979.

In 1989, he was invited to the United States, where he taught until he died of cancer at the hospital of Stanford University in July, 1992. He was 72.

== Contributions to linguistics ==
Zhu made significant contributions to the field of linguistics most particularly to the analysis of Chinese grammar. He is noted for promoting Chinese culture abroad and was invited to lecture in Bulgaria, America, France, Hong Kong, Thailand, and Singapore. In 1986, he was awarded an honorary doctorate from Paris Diderot University.

== Family ==
He married He Kongjing (Chinese: 何孔敬) in 1945. In 2007, she published a memoir about her husband titled in Chinese: "长相思——朱德熙其人",

== Social work ==
He was one of the representatives in the six and seventh National People's Congress. He also worked as an advisor on the Encyclopedia of China.

== Main works ==
- 《语法修辞讲话》
- 《现代汉语语法》
- Chinese Composition(《作文指导》, Zuo wen zhi dao)
- 《语法修辞正误练习》
