= China Association for Lexicography =

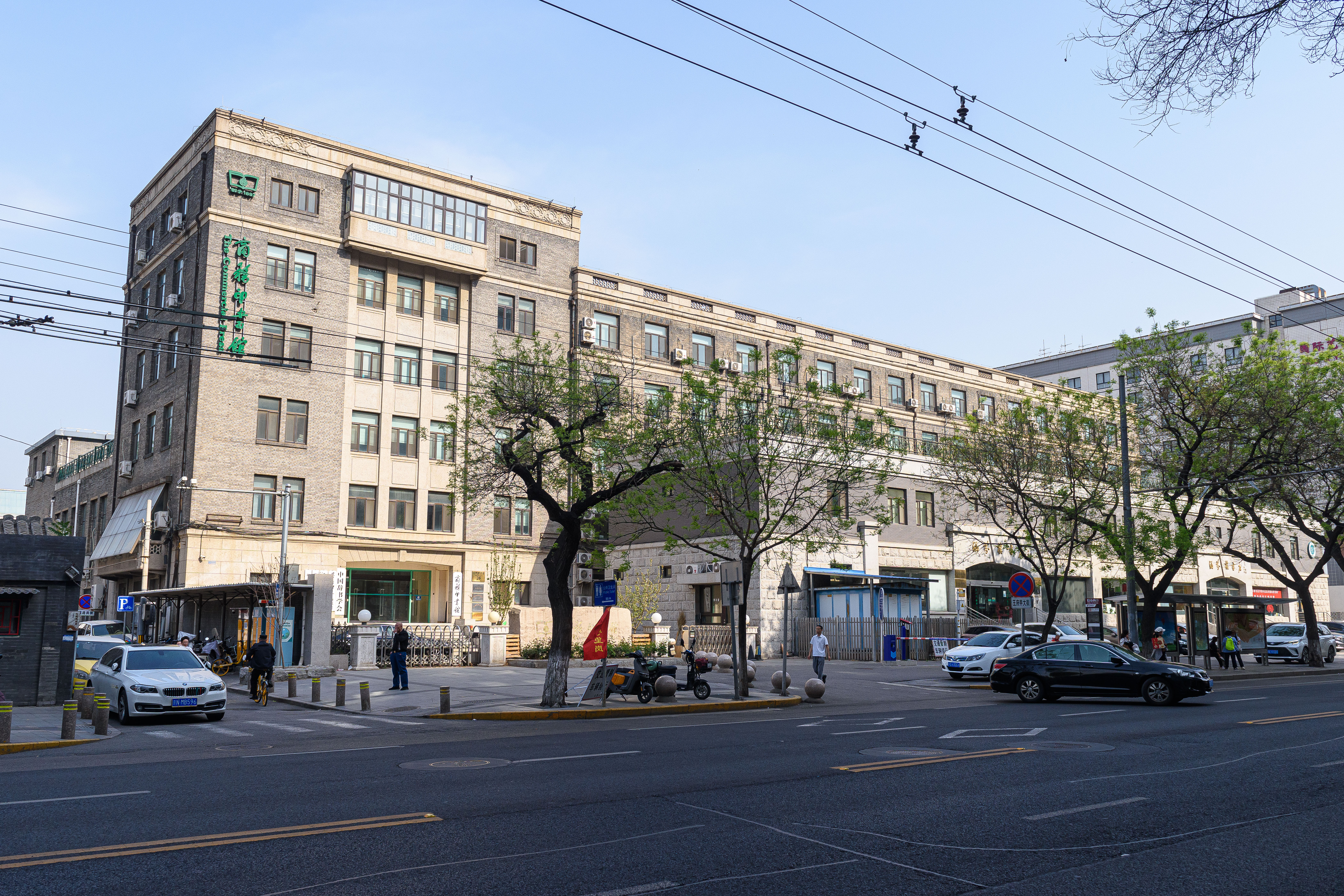
The plaque of the China Association for Lexicography is displayed at the headquarters of the Commercial Press

The China Association for Lexicography (Chinalex; Chinese: 中国辞书学会) is a nationwide academic organization of lexicographical researchers in the People's Republic of China. Established in November 1992, Chinalex is now a national level-1 academic organization with a number of sub-committees. Chinalex is affiliated with the Ministry of Education of the People's Republic of China.

== History ==
In October 1992, the China Association for Lexicography was established in Beijing. Cao Xianzhuo was elected as the first President.

In July 1995, the first National Dictionary Award Ceremony and the Second Annual Meeting of the China Association for Lexicography were held in Harbin, Heilongjiang Province.

In November 1997, the Third Annual Meeting of the China Association for Lexicography was held in Wuxi, Jiangsu Province, marking the change of leadership. The Second National Dictionary Award Ceremony was also held.

...

In November 2023, the 14th Congress and Academic Symposium of the China Association for Lexicography was held in Zhengding, Hebei Province. More than 200 experts and scholars from all over the country participated in the conference. The theme of the conference was "The Dictionary Life in the Digital Age."

In November 2025, the 15th Congress and Academic Symposium of the China Association for Lexicography was held in Changzhou, Jiangsu Province. The conference discusses topics such as "lexicography and publishing in the era of artificial intelligence".

== Purpose ==
The purpose of this association is to unite colleagues in dictionary compilation and research across the country, to discuss academic topics, exchange experiences, and to promote the prosperity and development of the dictionary cause of China.

== Responsibilities ==
The association's responsibilities include:

(i) Organizing nationwide academic meetings on dictionaries;

(ii) Facilitating communication between lexicographical research and lexicographical publication;

(iii) Cultivating talents capable of lexicographical research, planning, compilation, and editing;

(iv) Developing standards and norms for lexicographical publication, conducting lexicographical quality inspections, and holding lexicographical training courses;

(v) Conducting international academic exchanges.

== Special committees ==
The China Association for Lexicography has an Academic Committee and eight specialized committees in: (Chinese) Language Dictionary, Specialized Dictionary, Bilingual Dictionary, Encyclopedic Dictionary, Ethnic Dictionary, Dictionary Theory and History, Modern Technology for Dictionary Compiling, Editing and Publishing.

== Publications ==
The official journal of the China Association for Lexicography is Lexicographical Studies (辞书研究, bimonthly, in Chinese), the only academic journal in the field of Chinese lexicography. The Society also publishes an academic collection, Journal of Chinese Lexicography (中国辞书学报, in Chinese), periodically.

== Other information ==
China Association for Lexicography is now a national first-level academic organization affiliated with the Ministry of Education. Its administrative office and secretariat are located at the Commercial Press.

The current president is Li Yuming, and the vice presidents are Gu Qing, Kang Shiyong, Gao Shiyi, Pei Yajun, Qin Zhihua, Tan Jingchun, Wang Fang, Wang Renqiang, Xie Yang, Yu Chunchi, Zheng Zhenfeng, and Zhou Jian. Gu Qing also serves as the secretary-general.
