= Shen Jiaxuan =

Chinese linguist

Shen Jiaxuan (Chinese: 沈家煊; pinyin: Shěn Jiāxuān) is a Chinese linguist. He is the director of The Institute of Linguistics of the Chinese Academy of Social Sciences and the president of International Chinese Association. He is also a Member of the Chinese Academy of Social Sciences the chief editor of "contemporary linguistics".

== Biography ==
Shen Jiaxuan was born in Shanghai in 1946 while his native place is Wuxing, Zhejiang. In 1968, he graduated from Beijing Broadcasting College. After the Cultural Revolution, he enrolled at the language department of the graduate school of the Chinese Social Sciences college. his tutor was Zhao Shikai (赵世开). Then he stayed there for work since he graduated. He once went abroad for further language study in California University and Leiden University. Now he is a Master's and Doctor's tutor and a professor of Nankai University.

== Main essays ==
- “差不多”和“差点儿” "Chabuduo and chadianr" --《中国语文》(Chinese Language and Writing)第4期, 442-456页 (No.4, 442-456)
- 语用学 语用学和语义学的分界 （The division between pragmatics and semantics). --《外语教学与研究》（Foreign Language Teaching and Research）第2期, 26-35页（No.2, 26-35)
- “在”字句和“给”字句(A construction grammar of zai-sentences and gei-sentences） --《中国语文》（Chinese Language and Writing）第2期，94-102页（No.2, 94-102）
- “有界”与“无界”（Boundedness and unboundedness） --《中国语文》（Chinese Language and Writing）第5期,367-380页(No.5, 367-380)
- 转指和转喻(A metonymic model of transferred designation of de-constructions in Mandarin Chinese) --《当代语言学》(Contemporary Linguistics)第1期，3-15页(No.1, 3-15)
- 语用，认知，言外义 "Pragmatics, cognition, and implicature" --《外语教学与研究》(Foreign Languages and Teaching)第4期,10-12页 (No.4, 10-12)
