= The Cowshed =

1998 memoir by Ji Xianlin

The Cowshed: Memories of the Chinese Cultural Revolution
- Cover art of the 2016 English translation
- Author: Xianlin Ji
- Translator: Chenxin Jiang
- Language: Chinese
- Genre: Memoir
- Publisher: New York Review Books (English edition)
- Publication date: 1998
- English publication date: January 26, 2016
- Pages: 188 (English edition)
- ISBN: 978-1-5901-7926-0
- Dewey Decimal: 951.05092, B

The Cowshed: Memories of the Chinese Cultural Revolution (Chinese: 牛棚杂忆; pinyin: Niú péng zá yì, lit. "Memories of the Cowshed") is a memoir by Ji Xianlin recounting his persecution during the Chinese Cultural Revolution, first published in his home country of China in 1998 and later translated to English in 2016. Ji, a prolific historian and translator, was caught up in political turmoil at Beijing University in the 1960s and ultimately sent to a labor camp. The title refers to an informal prison known as a "cowshed" where Ji spent many months.

Ji wrote The Cowshed in an attempt to fill gaps in the historical record of the Cultural Revolution. The book's release came during a lenient period of government censorship and was widely read within the country. According to Ji, however, the memoir is not meant to denounce the Chinese Communist Party—he publicly supported the party until his death in 2009.

The English translation was published in January 2016 to positive reviews.

== Writing and publication ==
Despite his persecution in the 1960s and 70s, Ji remained a party stalwart and only decided to write the book in the 1980s during a period of liberalization within China. Upon reflection, he became critical of the anti-intellectualism of the Cultural Revolution and subsequent violence.

The book's manuscript is dated April 5, 1989, almost a decade before its release. The Chinese government was still highly censorious, especially in the wake of the June 4 Tiananmen Square massacre that would occur shortly after the manuscript's completion.

Ji, however, had many connections within the Communist Party and maintained a positive reputation as a scholar. By 1998, he managed to get the book published through the party's official publishing arm, in part because of his party loyalty. Despite allowing its publication, the government required that press write no more than 100 words about the book.

== Reception ==
Within China, The Cowshed was read by millions, particularly younger people. Its original print run quickly sold out, leading to a surge in counterfeit publications. In 2016, it was considered the most widely read account of the Cultural Revolution published in the country.

The English translation of The Cowshed received widespread praise, with critics calling it a "stark reminder" of an important period of history and a "meaningful" contribution to literature about the Cultural Revolution.

== See also ==
- Life and Death in Shanghai
