= Luo Changpei =

Chinese linguist (1899–1958)

- 罗常培
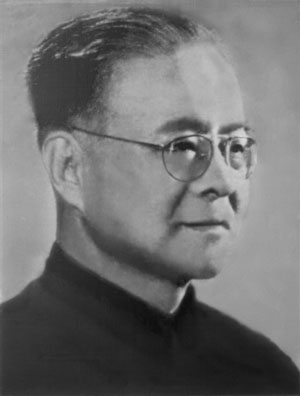
- Born: 9 August 1899; Beijing, Qing Empire
- Died: 13 December 1958 (aged 59); Beijing, People's Republic of China
- Education: Peking University
- Scientific career
- Fields: Chinese linguistics
- Workplaces: Peking University
- Notable students: Michael Halliday; David Hawkes; Yang Naisi

Chinese name
- Traditional Chinese: 羅常培
- Simplified Chinese: 罗常培
Transcriptions
Standard Mandarin
- Hanyu Pinyin: Luó Chángpéi
- Wade–Giles: Lo Ch'ang-p'ei
- IPA: [lwǒ ʈʂʰǎŋ.pʰěɪ]

Luo Changpei (Chinese: 羅常培; Wade–Giles: Lo Ch'ang-p'ei; 9 August 1899 – 13 December 1958) was a Chinese linguist. He made important contributions to the study of historical Chinese phonology. He was also a pioneer of the modern studies of Chinese dialects and of non-Chinese languages in China.

Born into a Manchu family, he graduated from the Peking University. Besides spending some years in the United States as a visiting scholar, he spent most of his academic life at Peking University. Among his students there were the British scholars Michael Halliday and David Hawkes. In 1929, along with Y.R. Chao and Li Fang-kuei, he became a researcher at the Institute of History and Philology (歷史語言研究所) of Academia Sinica (then located at Nanjing). He also served as director of the Institute of Linguistics at the Chinese Academy of Sciences until his death in 1958.

Luo also co-authored a book on the 'Phags-pa script with Cai Meibiao (Chinese: 蔡美彪).

== Bibliography ==
With Zhou Zumo (Chinese: 周祖謨)

- 1958. Han Wei Jin Nanbeichao yunbu yanbian yanjiu 漢魏晉南北朝韻部演變研究. Peking. Kexue Chubanshe

With Cai Meibiao (Chinese: 蔡美彪)

- 1959. Basibazi yu Yuandai Hanyu [Ziliao Huibian] 八思巴字與元代漢語[資料彙編]. Peking. Kexue Chubanshe. Revised edition, 2004.
