= Tang Xiaowei =

Chinese physicist (born 1931)

- Born: October 1931 (age 94); Wuxi, Jiangsu, China
- Education: Tsinghua University
- Scientific career
- Fields: Physics
- Workplaces: Chinese Academy of Sciences; Zhejiang University

Tang Xiaowei (Chinese: 唐孝威; pinyin: Tang Xiaowei, born October 1931) is a Chinese physicist who has made contributions to the Chinese applied physics field. He is an academician in Institute of High Energy Physics, Chinese Academy of Sciences and a professor at Zhejiang University.

== Life and education ==
He was born in Wuxi, Jiangsu in October 1931. His family has a strong academic atmosphere. He graduated from the Department of Physics in Tsinghua University. After graduation, he worked in different institutes doing nuclear research. At present, he is a professor and doctor tutor in Zhejiang University. He is also an adjunct professor of Peking University and University of Science and Technology of China. His researches generally concern nuclear physics and high-energy physics. He obtained some great achievements in the cross-field between physics and other subjects such as biology, medical science and neurobiology. As he was so authoritative in his field, he was awarded by the Chinese government as a national model worker in 1979, and was elected as a delegate to the 12th and 13th National Congress of the Chinese Communist Party.

== Career ==
His early career in physics is about High Energy and application to the nuclear technology. In recent years, he put most of his efforts in the cross-field between physics and medical science. One of his famous contribution to Chinese is that he has joined in the project of Chinese first atom bomb. In the project, his experiment is about the atom bomb’s ignition. As a academician in Chinese Academy of Sciences, he devoted himself to the measurement of electro-magnetic cascade shower and the study of particle detector with his group. During his career as a doctor tutor, he has instructed many outstanding scholars for the physics field of China.

== Accomplishments ==
In the 1950s, he was doing the research of nuclear detector and some pion experiments. Ten years later, he turned into the national defense scientific research field. In the 1970s, he participated in the famous event for China: 'The Atom Bomb, Superatomic Bomb and Satellite Project', which is well known as the 'Two Bombs and One Star' project for all the Chinese. At the end of the 70s, he restarted his work in experimental high energy physics. At the same time, he was sent to Hamburg and Geneva to doing some cooperation research in the field of high energy physics. In the 1980s, he began teaching, but at the same time, he still did his research in many physics fields. Later, he joined in the AMS study (Alfa spectrometer). During the 1990s, Tang made efforts in medical physics and brain science. Later, he and several Chinese neural scientists started the "Human Brain Project". At the beginning of the 21st century, he focused on the research of dreams, mood and conscious.

== Tang's three "launches" ==
Tang Xiaowei considers his life to have had three major challenges, which changed the trajectory of his research. He and his family call these challenges his "launches".

=== The first "launch" ===
Working on Chinese "Atom Bomb Project". This work includes nuclear test and the invention of nuclear detector. In 1952, Tang was graduated from Tsinghua University and assigned to Chinese Academy of Science. His team at the Ninth Academy invented China's first nuclear detector. At that time, Chinese geologists were finding uranium mines all over China. Tang's detector made great contribution to this researching activity. In 1958, he was sent to Dubna Union Nuclear Institute. In 1960, he received an order and came back to China. He was made a team leader and was responsible for the nuclear test.

=== The second "launch" ===
Discovering the secrets of gluon

In August 1977, Nobel laureate Samuel C. C. Ting, visited China, and the Chinese government asked Ting to cultivate 100 physicists for China. Tang was the leader of the first team. This team arrived at Hamburg in January, 1978. This team cooperate with an American team whose leader is Ting. These two teams worked in the project called "MARK-J experiment" at DESY. During their research, a fundamental particle that transmits strong interaction force was discovered, then this particle was named gluon.

=== The third "launch" ===
Working on medical science and brain science. In the 1980s, the famous Chinese biologist Bei Shizhang said to Tang Xiaowei:"You have already done many great works in physics. That's good. But I still think you have further potential. After you have explored the insentient science field, you should use you knowledge to explore another living science field, that is biology! Thus, you explored the whole nature." Tang was deeply inspired by these words. Professor Tang chose medical science. To adjust to this new research, Tang attended the courses held in Zhejiang University and indulged himself in library.

In 1994, Tang's research was included in "Chinese national Climbing Project", which is held by Chinese government. After that, Tang and his team were involved in a committee and Tang was made chairperson. This committee made contributions in cancer cure, the researches of cardiovascular and cerebrovascular diseases and the cure for brain diseases.

== List of academic papers ==
This list only consists part of Professor Tang's academic papers.

- Tang Xiaowei (2003), Principle of Brain Function
- Tang Xiaowei (2004), Consciousness—Perspective from Natural Scientific Studies
- Tang Xiaowei (2005), Nature of Dreaming—Comments on Freud's Theory
- Tang Xiaowei (2006), Introduction to Brain Science
- Tang Xiaowei (January 2002), Project for Human Brain and Neuroinformatics
- Tang Xiaowei (August 2002), Discussion on the Information Processing in the Brain in Dream
- Tang Xiaowei (March 2003), The Doctrine on Four Functional Systems of the Brain
- Tang Xiaowei (October 2003), Four Component Theory on Consciousness
- Tang Xiaowei (October 2004), Brain Area Energy State Theory of Conscious and Unconscious Activities
- Tang Xiaowei (2005), The Experimentation on the Correlated Activities of Consciousness Nerves
