= Fan Gang =

Chinese economist

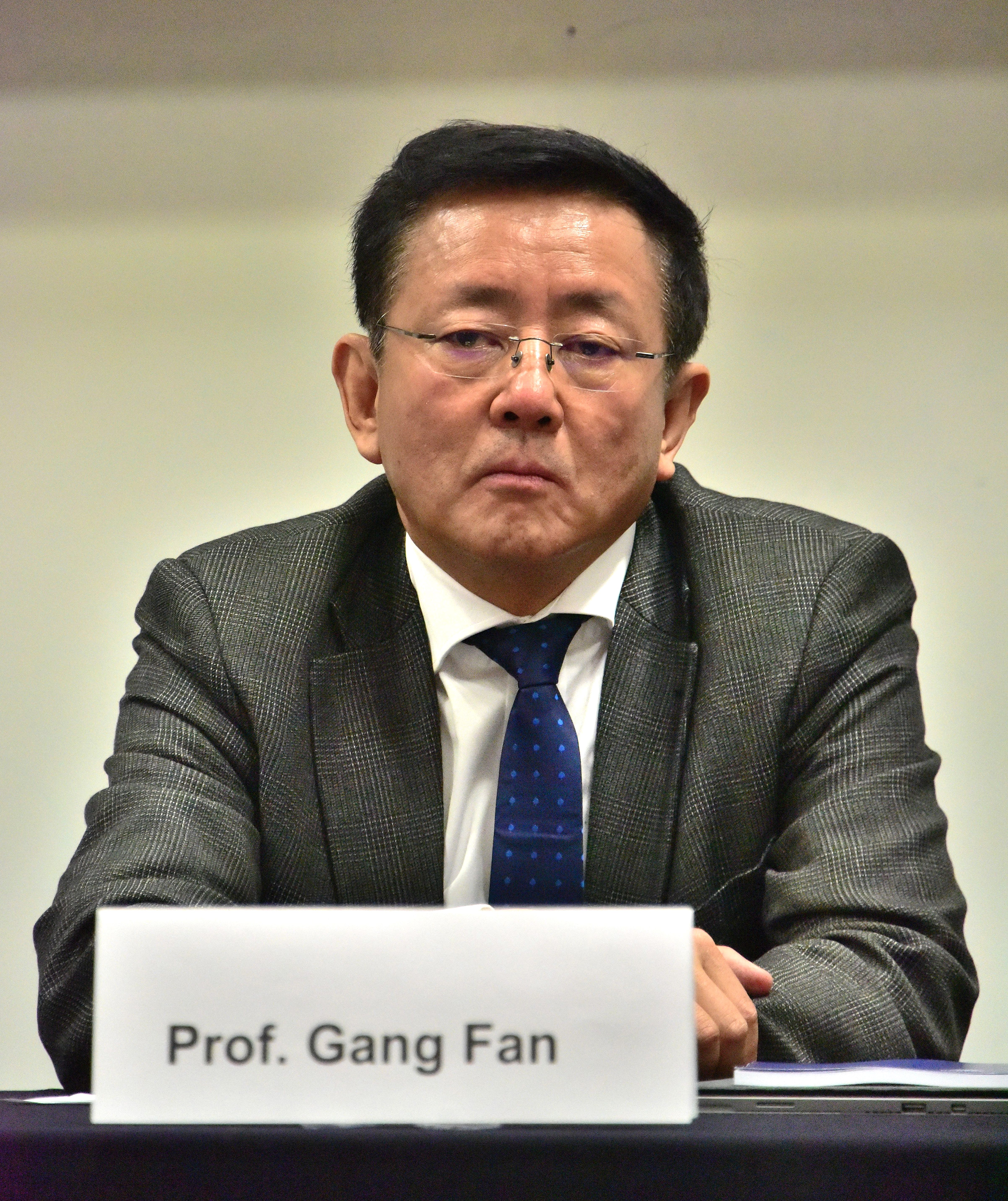
Fan Gang during a conference in Warsaw, Poland.

Fan Gang (simplified Chinese: 樊纲; traditional Chinese: 樊綱; pinyin: Fán Gāng; born in 1953) is one of China's most prominent economists and one of China's most active reform advocates. He is currently based in Beijing, serving as a professor at the Graduate School of Chinese Academy of Social Sciences (CASS) and at the Peking University HSBC Business School, as well as the director of China's National Economic Research Institute (NERI). He is also the Secretary-General of the China Reform Foundation.

== Biography ==
Dr. Fan serves as an advisor to numerous organizations, including the Monetary Policy Committee of the People's Bank of China. He is a well-respected expert in the macroeconomics of long-term development, international trade and currency, foreign relations and China's regional integration within Asia. He is most renowned for addressing such topics as China's financial risk and financial systems reform, foreign exchange regimes and revaluation, China's economic reform, and globalization.

=== Education ===
Dr. Fan Gang graduated from the Economics Department at Hebei University with a political economics major in 1982. Fan then studied Western economics in the Economics Department of the Graduate School of Chinese Academy of Social Sciences from 1982 to 1985. He subsequently spent two years as a visiting fellow at Harvard University and the US National Bureau of Economic Research from 1985 to 1987 and received his Ph.D. in economics from the Graduate School of the Chinese Academy of Social Sciences in 1988.

=== Publications ===
Dr. Fan has written over 100 academic papers, over 200 articles for magazines and newspapers worldwide along with eight books on macroeconomics and the economics of transition. He now regularly writes a monthly series called "Enter the Dragon" exclusively for the public-benefit corporation Project Syndicate. In "Enter the Dragon," Dr. Fan examines the trends that are shaping China's economy – and spells out what they mean for the rest of the world.

== Notable positions and achievements ==
=== Present ===
- Director, National Economic Research Institute
- Secretary-general, China Reform Foundation
- President, China Development Institute
- Professor, Graduate School of Chinese Academy of Social Sciences
- Professor, Peking University HSBC Business School
- Member, Advisory Committee of the Ministry of Labor and Social Security of China
- Member, Advisory Committee of the Hong Kong Center for Monetary Policy
- Member, Monetary Policy Committee of the People's Bank of China
- Advisor, State Foreign Exchange Administration of China
- International Advisor, Center for International Development, Harvard University
- Non-Executive Director, Ping An Insurance Company of China, Ltd.
- Fellow of the World Economic Forum (since 1994)
- Fellow of the Chinese Economist Society (USA; since 1993)
- Consultant to the World Bank, the United Nations Development Programme (UNDP), the United Nations Economic Social and Commission for Asia and the Pacific (ESCAP), and to the Organisation for Economic Co-operation and Development (OECD)

=== 2008 ===
- Dr. Fan Gang ranked 33rd in the "World's Top 100 Public Intellectuals" by both Foreign Policy and Prospect magazines.

=== 1995 ===
- Dr Fan Gang awarded 'Global Leader for Tomorrow' by the World Economic Forum in Davos.

== See also ==
- Graduate School of Chinese Academy of Social Sciences
