= Mansfield Freeman =

- Born: September 16, 1895; Waltham, Massachusetts
- Died: November 17, 1992; Greensboro, Vermont
- Education: Wesleyan University (BA)
- Occupation: Insurance executive

Mansfield Freeman was born in Waltham, Massachusetts on September 16, 1895, the son of Luther Freeman, a Methodist minister. He was one of the original management group that started an insurance business in China that became the American International Group (AIG). He also was a prominent scholar of Chinese philosophy and a generous philanthropist. He died on November 17, 1992, at his farm in Greensboro, Vermont at the age of 97.

Freeman was also the founder of the Freeman Foundation. He was an alumnus of Wesleyan University in Connecticut, year of 1916. The Freeman Asian Scholarship was established at Wesleyan in his honor. In addition, his endowment established the Freeman Center for East Asian Studies at the university.

Freeman's published works include an introduction to and translation of Preservation of Learning by Yen Yuan, a 17th-century Chinese philosopher. In 1990, he co-authored Tai Chen and Mencius: Explorations in Words and Meaning with Annping Chin, who is now a professor at Yale.
