= Yang Tianshi =

Chinese historian (born 1936)

- 杨天石
- Born: February 15, 1936 (age 90); Dongtai, Jiangsu, China
- Other names: Su Ren; Jiang Dongyang; Wu Zhimin; Liang Zhiyan
- Occupation: Historian

Academic background
- Education: Peking University

Academic work
- Discipline: History
- Sub-discipline: Modern history
- Institutions: Chinese Academy of Social Sciences

Chinese name
- Traditional Chinese: 楊天石
- Simplified Chinese: 杨天石
Transcriptions
Standard Mandarin
- Hanyu Pinyin: Yáng Tiānshí

Yang Tianshi (Chinese: 杨天石; pinyin: Yáng Tiānshí; born 15 February 1936) is a Chinese historian who is a professor at the Graduate School of the Chinese Academy of Social Sciences. He is a member of the Chinese Academy of Social Sciences and the Central Research Institute of Culture and History. He has been hailed as first person from mainland China to study Chiang Kai-shek.

== Biography ==
Yang was born in Dongtai, Jiangsu, on February 15, 1936. He attended Tianxia Town Central Primary School. He secondary studied at Wuxi No.1 High School. In 1955, he entered Peking University, where he majored in Chinese. After graduation, he was assigned to Bayi Agricultural Machinery School. In February 1962, he was hired as a teacher at the High School Affiliated to Beijing Normal University. During the Cultural Revolution, he was labeled as a "bourgeois intellectual". He worked for 16 years until he was assigned to the Institute of Modern History of the Chinese Academy of Social Sciences as an assistant research fellow in 1978. He was promoted to associate research fellow in 1983 and to research fellow in 1988. Yang Tianshi was employed as the doctoral supervisor of the Graduate School of the Chinese Academy of Social Sciences in 1994 and was employed as a member of the Central Research Institute of Culture and History in September 1998.

== Works ==
- The Riddle of the Zhongshan Gunboat Incident. Beijing: Social Sciences in China. 1991.
- What Happened after the Zhongshan Gunboat Incident. Beijing: Social Science in China. 1993.
- 找寻真实的蒋介石：蒋介石日记解读 [Looking for the Real Chiang Kai-shek: An Interpretation of Chiang Kai Shek's Diary] (in Chinese). Chongqing: Chongqing Publishing House. 2018.
- 找寻真实的蒋介石：还原13个历史真相 [Seeking the Real Chiang Kai-shek: Restoring 13 Historical Truths] (in Chinese). Jiuzhou Publishing House. 2014. ISBN 9787510829505.
- 杨天石 (2018). 找寻真实的蒋介石:蒋介石在台湾 [Looking for the Real Chiang Kai-shek: Chiang Kai Shek in Taiwan] (in Chinese). ISBN 9787520704649.
- 华章大历史·蒋氏秘档与蒋介石真相 [The Great History: the Secret Files of Chiang Kai-shek and the Truth of Chiang Kai Shek] (in Chinese). Chongqing: Chongqing Publishing House. 2019. ISBN 9787229102975.
- 朱熹：孔子之后第一儒 [Zhu Xi: the First Confucian after Confucius] (in Chinese). Shanghai: Oriental Publishing House. 2019. ISBN 9787520706636.
- 华章大历史·从帝制走向共和 [The Great History: From Monarchy to Republic] (in Chinese). Chongqing: Chongqing Publishing House. 2020. ISBN 9787229098100.
- 抗战与战后 [Wartime and Postwar] (in Chinese). Beijing: China Development Press. 2015. ISBN 9787517703082.
- 南社史三种 [History of Nanshe] (in Chinese). Shanghai: Oriental Publishing House. 2020. ISBN 9787520712316.
- 华章大历史·追寻历史的印迹 [Great History: Tracing the Imprint of History] (in Chinese). Chongqing: Chongqing Publishing House. 2020.
- 崛起与北伐 [Rise and Northern Expedition] (in Chinese). Beijing: China Development Press. 2015. ISBN 9787517703068.
- 民初政局 [Political Situation in the Early Republic of China] (in Chinese). Beijing: China Development Press. 2015. ISBN 9787517703075.
- 晚清风云 [The Situation of Late Qing Dynasty] (in Chinese). Beijing: China Development Press. 2015. ISBN 9787517703044.
- 奋起 [Rise Vigorously] (in Chinese). Beijing: China Development Press. 2015. ISBN 9787517703051.
- 数风流 [Truly Great Men] (in Chinese). Beijing: China Development Press. 2015. ISBN 9787517703099.
- 外患内忧 [Foreign Invasion and Domestic Trouble] (in Chinese). Beijing: China Development Press. 2015. ISBN 9787517703105.
- 民国史谈：弹指兴衰多少事 [On the History of the Republic of China] (in Chinese). Beijing: CPC Central Committee Party School Press. 2008. ISBN 9787503539435.
- 国民党人与前期中华民国 [Kuomintang and the Early Republic of China] (in Chinese). Beijing: Renmin University Press of China. 2007. ISBN 9787300083018.
- 杨天石文集 [Collected Works of Yang Tianshi] (in Chinese). Shanghai: Shanghai Lexicographical Publishing House. 2000. ISBN 9787532617777.
- 帝制的终结：简明辛亥革命史 [The End of Monarchy: A Brief History of the Revolution of 1911] (in Chinese). Changsha, Hunan: Yuelu Publishing House. 2011. ISBN 9787807616368.
- 蒋介石与南京国民政府 [Chiang Kai-shek and the Nanjing National Government] (in Chinese). Beijing: Renmin University Press of China. 2007. ISBN 9787300083025.
- 近代中国：风云时代与风云人物 [Modern China: Stormy Times and Stormy Figures] (in Chinese). Beijing: Workers' Publishing House. 2016. ISBN 9787500864202.
