= Lü Shuxiang =

Chinese linguist and educator (1904–1998)

- 吕叔湘
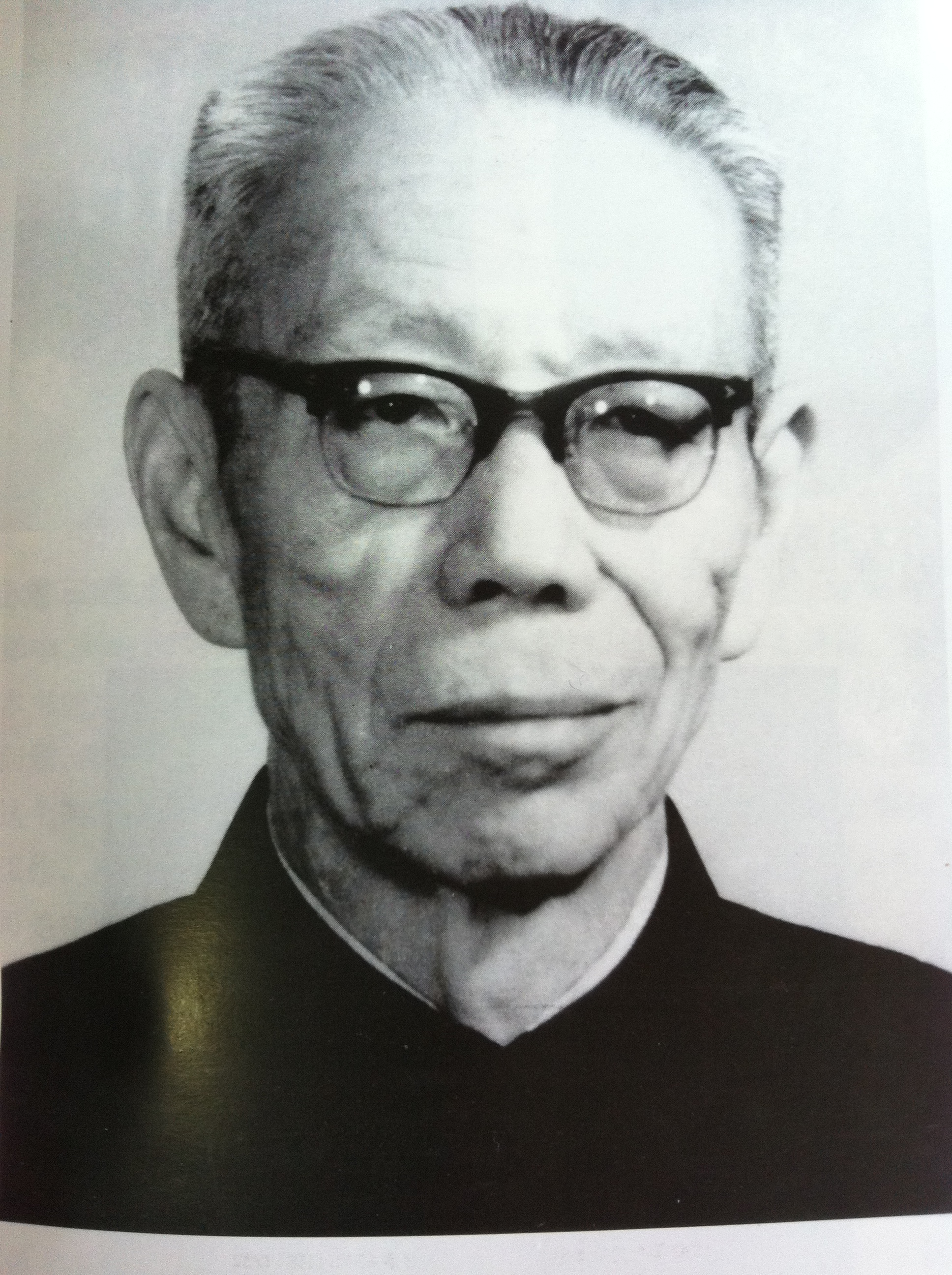
- Born: 24 December 1904; Danyang, Jiangsu
- Died: 9 April 1998 (aged 93); Beijing
- Occupations: Linguist, educator

Lü Shuxiang (Chinese: 吕叔湘; pinyin: Lǚ Shūxiāng, 1904–1998) was a Chinese linguist, lexicographer and educator, and a pioneer of modern Chinese linguists.

== Overview ==
Lü Shuxiang was born in Danyang, Jiangsu Province. He studied Foreign Languages and Literature in the National Central University and graduated in 1926. He then taught in Danyang Middle School and Suzhou High School. In 1936, he went to England for postgraduate studies in the Anthropology Department of Oxford University and then in the Library Science Department of the University of London. He returned to China in 1938 during the Second Sino-Japanese war, and held various professorships in Yunnan University, Huaxi Union College and Jinling College, and later, the National Central University.

After the establishment of the People's Republic of China, Lü was a professor in the Chinese Department of Tsinghua University from 1950 to 1952. Starting from 1952, he worked in the Institute of Languages in the Chinese Academy of Sciences. He was a committee member and vice director of the important China Language Reform Commission. From 1978 to 1985, he was the chief editor of the journal Chinese philology. From 1980 to 1985, he was the president of the Association of Chinese Linguistics. He was editor-in-chief of the authoritative Xiandai Hanyu Cidian, and served on the editorial board for the Encyclopedia of China. In 1987, he was awarded honorary Doctor of Literature by the Chinese University of Hong Kong. He was an associate fellow in the Russian Academy of Sciences in 1997.

The artist and art educator Lü Fengzi (1886–1959), and the prominent Buddhist scholar Lü Cheng (1896–1989), were his cousins. In addition, he was the father-in-law to Chinese physicist Tang Xiaowei and uncle to Peking University educated scholar Lü Qisu.

== Main works ==
- 《中国文法要略》
- 《文言虚字》
- 《现代汉语八百词》
- 《近代汉语指代词》
- 《中国人学英文》
- 《语文修辞讲话》

== Translations ==
- 《文明与野蛮》
- 《伊坦•弗洛美》 (Ethan Frome)
