= Institute of Linguistics of the Chinese Academy of Social Sciences =

Chinese government research institute

The Institute of Linguistics (中国社会科学院语言研究所) is the language research institution of the Chinese Academy of Social Sciences. It was established in June 1950 by the name of "Institute of Linguistics, Chinese Academy of Sciences". In 1977, after the establishment of the Chinese Academy of Social Sciences, it was renamed the "Institute of Linguistics, Chinese Academy of Social Sciences". This institute is the editor of the Xinhua Dictionary and the Contemporary Chinese Dictionary.

== Research offices ==
The mission of the Institute of Linguistics (CASS) is to study the history and current state of the Chinese language. There are the academic research offices of Chinese Syntax and Semantics, Historical Linguistics I, Historical Linguistics II, Chinese Dialectology, Contemporary Linguistics, Applied Linguistics, Phonetics and Speech Science, as well as the office of Lexicography and the office of Innovative Lexicology and Lexicography.

== Journals ==
The Institute sponsors three key academic journals, including Zhongguo Yuwen (中国语文; 'Chinese Language', bimonthly, founded in 1952), Dialect (方言, quarterly, founded in 1979) and Contemporary Linguistics (当代语言学, bimonthly, founded in 1961).

== Dictionaries ==
The institute is also responsible for the preparation and revision of the Xinhua Dictionary, the Contemporary Chinese Dictionary, and the Large Modern Chinese Dictionary (现代汉语大词典).

== Teaching ==
The institute is also responsible for teaching work at the College of Humanities of the University of Chinese Academy of Social Sciences, and offers the majors in Chinese Philology and Linguistics and in Applied Linguistics, leading to the Master of Arts and Doctor of Philosophy degrees. And there are postdoctoral research stations in the institute for Chinese Philology, and Linguistics and Applied Linguistics.

== See also ==
- University of Chinese Academy of Social Sciences
- Chinese Academy of Social Sciences
