= Chinese Academy of Social Sciences =

State research institute and think tank based in China

- 中国社会科学院

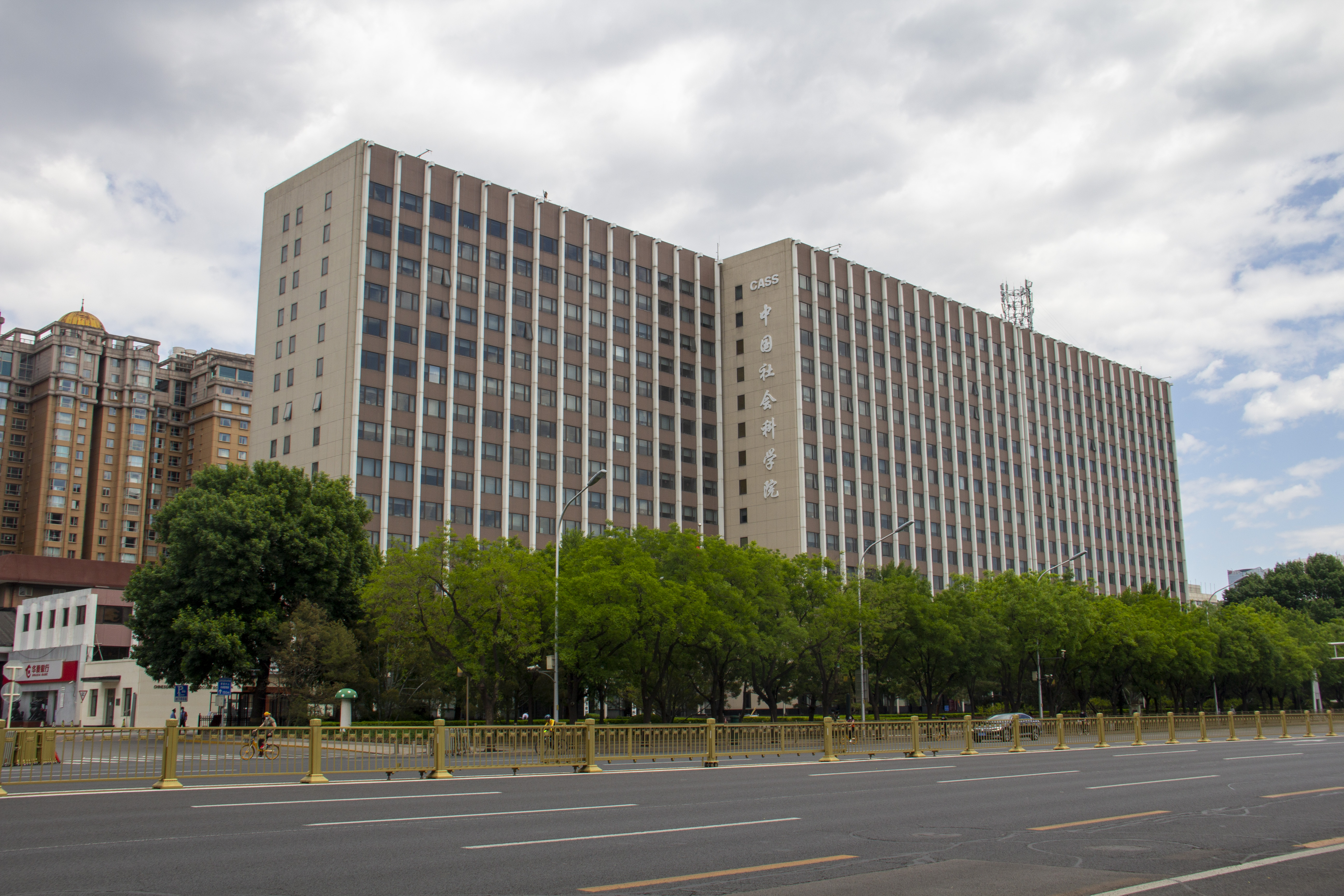
- CASS headquarters
- Abbreviation: CASS
- Formation: May 7, 1977; 49 years ago
- Type: Think tank
- Headquarters: South Middle Ring Road, Wangjing Area, Chaoyang District
- Location: Beijing, China
- Coordinates: 39.9078°N 116.4262°E
- Party Secretary and President: Gao Xiang
- Parent organization: State Council of China
- Subsidiaries: China Social Sciences Press
- Website: cssn.cn

Chinese name
- Simplified Chinese: 中国社会科学院
- Traditional Chinese: 中國社會科學院
Transcriptions
Standard Mandarin
- Hanyu Pinyin: Zhōngguó Shèhuì Kēxuéyuàn

The Chinese Academy of Social Sciences (CASS) is a state research institute and think tank of the People's Republic of China. It is a ministry-level institution under the State Council. The CASS is considered the country's top academic institution for philosophy and social sciences research.

The CASS was founded in May 1977. Its predecessor was the Department of Philosophy and Social Sciences of the Chinese Academy of Sciences. The main research objects of the Academy of Social Sciences are the language, philosophy, law, economy, religion, ethnicity, archaeology, history and literature of China and other countries in the world. The Academy of Social Sciences is divided into 6 academic departments and 37 research institutes.

== History ==
The predecessor of the Chinese Academy of Social Sciences was the Department of Philosophy and Social Sciences of the Chinese Academy of Sciences, established in 1955. The Division of Philosophy and Social Sciences of the Chinese Academy of Sciences, the predecessor of CASS, elected 61 members of the academy.

The CASS was established in May 1977 based on splitting the Department of Philosophy and Social Sciences from the Chinese Academy of Sciences, with the aim of promoting the development of philosophy and social sciences, under the instruction of Deng Xiaoping. The first president was Hu Qiaomu.

In 1979, CASS Vice President Huan Xiang led the first Chinese delegation of social scientists to travel to the United States.

In August 2006, the first batch of 47 members and 95 honorary members of the Chinese Academy of Social Sciences were selected. Subsequent elections were held in:

- 2010: 10 new members, 38 Honorary Members
- 2014: 4 new members
- 2018: 12 new members
- 2024: 9 new members.

Up to 2024, a total of 82 members had been selected from the entire academy (as of March 2022, there were 133 honorary members).

== Members ==
The Membership of the Chinese Academy of Social Sciences (Chinese: 中国社会科学院学部委员) and Honorary Membership of the Chinese Academy of Social Sciences (Chinese: 中国社会科学院荣誉学部委员) are the highest academic titles within CASS, and are lifelong honors. The members are active scholars, while honorary members are retired scholars. They are elected for different academic divisions of the Chinese Academy of Social Sciences every four years.

=== Selection and Evaluation ===
The selection processes include:

- Nomination by members and affiliated units,
- Review and recommendation by the candidate evaluation committee,
- Public announcement,
- Evaluation by external experts,
- Final review and election by the academic assembly,
- Approval by the academy party committee.

Criteria emphasize:

- Significant academic achievements
- National or international recognition
- Integrity and scholarly conduct
- Contributions to the development of philosophy and social sciences in China

The Election is carried out every two to four years. Unlike the selection of academicians for the Chinese Academy of Sciences and the Chinese Academy of Engineering, the members and honorary members are selected only from within the Chinese Academy of Social Sciences, with no participation from universities or other social science circles.

CASS members do not enjoy any special treatment in terms of material benefits.

=== Honorary Members ===
Honorary Members are:

- Retired senior scholars
- Individuals with long-term, distinguished academic service
- Scholars whose influence is widely recognized.

The honorary members were elected by members and the honorary members selection committee and approved by the Chinese Academy of Social Sciences administrative meeting. They do not participate in administrative functions but retain lifetime recognition. Honorary members and members of the Chinese Academy of Social Sciences have an academic status roughly equivalent to academicians of the Chinese Academy of Sciences and the Chinese Academy of Engineering.

== Structure ==
The CASS is a ministry-level institution under the State Council. As of 2012, CASS has over 3,200 resident scholars. As of November 2020, the CASS has 6 university departments, 42 research institutes, 6 functional departments, 5 directly affiliated institutions, and 3 directly affiliated companies. Of its functional departments, five are focused on research.

CASS houses the Graduate School of Chinese Academy of Social Sciences, which later became the University of Chinese Academy of Social Sciences.

The Institute of Taiwan Studies at CASS is under the control of the Fifteenth Bureau of the Ministry of State Security.

The Dictionary Editing Office of the Institute of Linguistics edits Xiandai Hanyu Cidian and the Xinhua Dictionary. The China Social Sciences Press was established in June 1978 under the auspices of the CASS, and has published over 8,000 books since its inception.

The CASS has the following internal structure:

=== Internal organization ===
- General Office
- Bureau of Scientific Research Management (General Office of Academic Divisions)
- Personnel Bureau
- Bureau of International Cooperation (Hong Kong, Macao, and Taiwan Office)
- Administrative Bureau of Finance, Infrastructure Construction and Assets
- Party Committee of the Organization (Office of the Leading Group for Party Group Inspection Work)
- Bureau of Work for Veteran Cadres

=== Directly affiliated institutions ===
==== Directly affiliated research units ====
Academic Division of Philosophy and Literature

- Institute of Literature
- Institute of Ethnic Literature
- Institute of Foreign Literature
- Institute of Linguistics
- Institute of Philosophy
- Institute of World Religions

Academic Division of History

- Chinese Academy of History (Deputy Ministerial Level)
- Institute of Archaeology (China Archaeological Museum)
- Institute of History (Guo Moruo Memorial Hall, China National Studies Research and Exchange Center)
- Institute of Modern History
- Institute of World History
- Institute of Chinese Borderland Studies
- Institute of Historical Theory
- Institute of Taiwan Studies

Academic Division of Economics

- Institute of Economics
- Institute of Industrial Economics
- Rural Development Institute
- National Academy of Economic Strategy
- Institute of Finance and Banking
- Institute of Quantitative and Technological Economics
- Institute of Population and Labor Economics
- Research Institute for Eco-civilization

Academic Division of Social, Political and Legal Studies

- Institute of Law
- Institute of International Law
- Institute of Political Science
- Institute of Ethnology and Anthropology
- Institute of Sociology
- National Academy of Chinese Modernization
- Institute of Journalism and Communication Studies

Academic Division of International Studies

- Institute of World Economics and Politics
- Institute of Russian, Eastern European and Central Asian Studies
- Institute of European Studies
- Institute of West-Asian and African Studies (China-Africa Institute)
- Institute of Latin American Studies
- National Institute of International Strategy
- Institute of American Studies
- Institute of Japanese Studies
- Institute of Peaceful Development

Academic Division of Marxist Studies

- Academy of Marxism
- Institute of Contemporary China Studies
- Institute of Information Studies
- Chinese Academy of Social Sciences Evaluation Studies

==== Directly affiliated colleges and universities ====
- University of Chinese Academy of Social Sciences (Graduate School of Chinese Academy of Social Sciences)

==== Other directly affiliated institutions ====
- Chinese Academy of Social Sciences Library (Survey and Data Center)
- Social Sciences in China Press
- Chinese Academy of Social Sciences Service
- Center for Cultural Development and Promotion
- Office of Guiding Group for China’s Local Chronicles Compilation (State Local Chronicles Museum, Local Chronicles Publishing House)

=== Directly affiliated enterprise units ===
- China Social Sciences Press
- Social Sciences Academic Press
- Chinese Corporation for Promotion of Humanities (China Economic and Technical Consulting Corporation)
- China-run publishing and media group

== Activities ==
Every quarter, CASS hosts a high-level seminar to which it invites officials from other developing countries to discuss topics including governance in China, poverty alleviation, and socio-economic development.

According to Chen Daoyin, a former professor at the Shanghai University of Political Science and Law, CASS "is not so much an academic institution but a body to formulate party ideology to support the leadership." CASS employees periodically submit observations of colleagues' behavior to inspection teams, especially of colleagues who criticize the Chinese Communist Party in private.

== List of CCP Committee Secretaries and presidents ==
English name	Chinese name	Took office	Left office	Ref.
Hu Qiaomu	胡乔木	1977	1982	
Ma Hong	马洪	1982	1985	
Hu Qiaomu	胡乔木	1985	1988	
Hu Sheng	胡绳	1988	1998	
Li Tieying	李铁映	March 1998	January 2003	
Chen Kuiyuan	陈奎元	January 2003	April 2013	
Wang Weiguang	王伟光	April 2013	March 2018	
Xie Fuzhan	谢伏瞻	March 2018	May 2022	
Shi Taifeng	石泰峰	May 2022	December 2022	
Gao Xiang	高翔	December 2022	Incumbent	

== See also ==
- Chinese Academy of Sciences
- Graduate School of Chinese Academy of Social Sciences
- Shanghai Academy of Social Sciences
- University of Chinese Academy of Social Sciences
- Members of the Chinese Academy of Social Sciences
