= Chiang Kai-shek's Secret Past =

Book by Jennie Chen Jieru

- Traditional Chinese: 陳潔如回憶錄
- Simplified Chinese: 陈洁如回忆录
Transcriptions
Standard Mandarin
- Hanyu Pinyin: Chén Jiérú Huíyìlù

Chiang Kai-shek's Secret Past: The Memoir of His Second Wife, Ch'en Chieh-ju is a book by Jennie Chen Jieru (as Chen Chieh-ju), with Lloyd E. Eastman as the editor and author of the introduction. It was the final work with work done by Eastman.

Chen was the second wife of Chiang Kai-shek, and this book is a memoir of her experiences with Chiang.

== Background ==
Chen hoped to get revenue by publishing a book, and Chiang had encouraged Chen to keep a diary, allowing her to remember what people said in conversations. Chen told her story to a friend, a banker in Hong Kong named James Lee. He secretly wrote the memoir in English. The Kuomintang (KMT), Chiang's political party, attempted to prevent Chen's recollections from going public. The KMT had asked Chen to give the party all of the correspondence she had.

Eastman, a professor, made some copyediting, including in regards to the use of English, and wrote his own footnotes. The Taiwan edition published in 1992 includes an introduction written by Wang Ke-wen, a professor who studied the KMT who identified which parts of the memoir were not accurate. Book reviewer Gregor Benton wrote that Wang "finds so many mistakes and untruths in it that Wang is unable to accept the veracity even of its account of Chiang Kai-shek's personal behaviour toward Jennie." Eastman himself stated Chiang Kai-shek's Secret Past "contains a number of errors, both large and small". However Eastman reasoned that the memoirs were largely accurate because of her presence at various events, her seven-year marriage, and several of her pre-breakup accounts being, in the words of Roger B. Jeans of Washington and Lee University, "remarkably free of acrimony".

== Contents ==
The book includes copies of letters written by Chiang and letters written to Chiang.

Jeans stated that Chen had "understandable bitterness at her treatment by Chiang", which, along with the financial rationale, "naturally arouses skepticism among readers."

== Reception ==
Benton wrote that he wished that there were additional footnotes that discussed which parts of the accounts were or were not reliable and a text comparison of the letters to events which would have proven parts of the memoir true. He stated "Had enough of the letters been corroborated, I would feel safer accepting controversial statements by Jennie not open to such checking."

An American secretary named Ginny Connor, who took her own notes of Jennie Chen's memoirs, stated that Eastman's status of a professor meant he successfully proved that Chen's words were true, and Connor stated her desire to write her own book using the memoirs she had.
