= Sakuma Foundation's Indigenous Artifacts Collection Project =

Acquisition program

The Sakuma Foundation's Indigenous Artifacts Collection Project was a large-scale systematic acquisition program for the collection of artifacts of the indigenous peoples in Taiwan under Japanese rule. Between 1927 and 1929, the Sakuma Foundation was responsible for funding the acquisition of 1,760 artifacts from Taiwanese indigenous peoples, which were acquired by the Indigenous Pacification Section of the Department of Police of the Government-General of Taiwan.

== Historical background ==
The establishment of the Sakuma Foundation was associated with Sakuma Samata, the fifth governor-general of Taiwan during the Japanese colonial rule. Sakuma served as governor-general from 1906 to 1915, and was the longest serving governor-general among all the governor-generals of Taiwan. He was also known as “governor-general of indigenous pacification” At the onset of his term of office in 1906, he set a five-year plan for the pacification of the indigenous peoples, with the important policy objectives of "eradicating uncultured aborigines", promoting the development of "aborigine’s land", and acquiring Taiwan's mountain resources. The five-year indigenous pacification program was divided into two phases. The first phase, which began in 1907, was based on a combination of suppression and appeasement, and its attack strategy was to lure the tribes in the mountainous region to agree to set up a line of defensive militias in their territory, and after the deployment was completed, large-scale force was used to suppress the indigenous people. Those who had submitted were moved out of their home territory and made to cultivate the land. The second phase, which began in 1910, was mainly a strong military expeditionary campaign to force the indigenous peoples of Taiwan to submit from the north to the south and east. At the end of the armed conflicts in 1914, Governor-General Sakuma reported the completion of the indigenous pacification project to the Emperor and left office in April 1915. He died in August 1916 due to an old illness caused by the indigenous pacification expedition.

On July 31, 1918 (Taisho 7), Hiroshi Shimomura, the then civil administrator of the Government-General of Taiwan, submitted an application for the establishment of the Sakuma Foundation, the purpose of which was to commemorate the achievements of the fifth governor-general, Mr. Sakuma Samata, in developing Taiwan, with scholarship, charity, and relief work, and to set up a monument to Governor-General Sakuma. It was established on September 12 of the same year with the consent of Governor-General Akashi Motojiro. In accordance with the General Provisions of its founding, the Sakuma Foundation was organized with the civil administrator of the Government-General of Taiwan as its chairperson, and the chairperson appointed the directors to form the Board of Directors, as well as the supervisors, officers, and staff to take charge of the affairs of the Foundation and the general affairs. The Sakuma Foundation was dissolved after the end of the Japanese colonial rule, having lasted for about thirty years.

== Process ==
The indigenous artifacts collection project was financed by the Sakuma Foundation, and the Indigenous Pacification Section of the Department of Police was responsible for acquiring the artifacts, which took about two and a half years from March 1927 to October 1929. According to Fumio Goto, Chairperson of the Sakuma Foundation, the purpose of the indigenous artifacts collection project was not only to commemorate Governor-General Sakuma's policy on the pacification of indigenous peoples, but also to preserve the customs and cultural relics of Taiwan's indigenous peoples in the face of rapid cultural change. Therefore, at the beginning of the project, a "Collection Plan" was drawn up, listing 99 items, covering almost all ethnic groups and artifacts of Taiwan's indigenous people, and setting a three-tier collection standard according to the importance of each item in each ethnic group. The first level indicates that all the items in this category should be collected as much as possible, such as the beaded clothes (skirts) of the Atayal, wood carvings of the Paiwan, etc. The second level indicates that the better items in this category should be collected as much as possible, such as the square clothes (sleeveless short clothes) of the Atayal, etc. The third level indicates that only one set of items in this category should be collected, such as the fishing gear and other household objects of each tribe. In addition to the three acquisition criteria mentioned above, the project also includes a list of supplementary criteria to be followed for actual acquisition, including: "Objects of the same item should be included in a wide variety of forms, materials, production techniques, and patterns", "Objects not listed but necessary for preservation should be collected regardless of quantity", and "Objects of value that may be sold should be loaned and exhibited to the greatest extent possible".

With such a collection purpose, plan, and criteria, the Sakuma Foundation's collection project began in earnest, and members of the collection team assigned by the Indigenous Pacification Section of the Department of Police of the Government General of Taiwan traveled to various parts of Taiwan to acquire artifacts for the collection. These collectors, with the support and assistance of the local police network, were able to complete such a large and systematic collection program.

== Results and impact ==
During its two and a half years of operation, the Sakuma Foundation's Indigenous Artifacts Collection Project collected a total of 1,760 artifacts of Taiwan's indigenous ethnic groups from 207 communities, and compiled a complete collection of data. The collection covers the areas of modern-day Taipei, Hsinchu, Taichung, Tainan, Kaohisung, Hualien, and Taitung. The indigenous groups targeted include the Atayal, Saisiyat, Bunun, Tsou, Paiwan, Amis, Yami (Tao), and plains indigenous, making it the most complete and comprehensive collection of cultural relics of Taiwan's indigenous peoples during the Japanese colonial rule.

One of the more prominent members of the collection committee is the sinologist Hotsuma Ozaki, who has special insights into Taiwanese history and Taiwanese museums. According to records, Ozaki acquired at least 70 artifacts related to Taiwan's indigenous peoples during his tenure on the collection committee.

The artifacts obtained from the Sakuma Foundation's Indigenous Artifacts Collection Project later entered the collection of the Taiwan Governor-General's Office Museum (now the National Taiwan Museum) and became one of the main sources of the collection of the Museum, which is the earliest and most systematic collection of indigenous ethnic artifacts in Taiwan, laying an important foundation for the museum's collection of indigenous ethnic artifacts. According to subsequent research by the curators, this collection of artifacts includes the beaded anklet of Mona Rudao, the leader of the 1930 Wushe Incident, and is the only known preserved relic of Mona Rudao. Since 2017, the exhibition has been on display in the museum's permanent exhibition "Discovering Taiwan – The Permanent Exhibition of the New Century".
