= Feng-Ying Chang =

Indigenous Taiwanese weaver

Feng-Ying Chang (Kari Truku language: Seta Bakan; born 1957), is a weaver from Taiwan. She is a member of the Seediq people.

Chang was born in the Central Plains tribe of Ren'ai Township, Nantou County. Feng-Ying Chang learned weaving from her grandmother, Yu-Ying Chang, when she was a child. After getting married, she often returned to the tribe to accompany her grandmother while weaving, which passed down Yu-Ying Chang's weaving style to her granddaughter.

In 2012, Feng-Ying Chang was recognized as a preserver of the traditional craft "Sediq traditional weaving craft, the puniri technique" by the Nantou County Government. In 2021, she was recognized as the preserver of the important traditional craft project "Sediq Gaya tminun Traditional Weaving" by the Ministry of Culture.
