= Warriors of the Rainbow: Seediq Bale =

- Film poster
- Directed by: Wei Te-sheng
- Written by: Wei Te-sheng
- Produced by: John Woo; Jimmy Huang; Terence Chang
- Starring: Nolay Piho; Yuki Daki; Umin Boya; Masanobu Andō; Kawahara Sabu; Yuichi Kimura; Vivian Hsu; Landy Wen; Irene Luo; Chie Tanaka
- Cinematography: Chin Ting-chang
- Edited by: Chen Po-Wen; Milk Su
- Music by: Ricky Ho
- Distributed by: Vie Vision Pictures
- Release dates: September 9, 2011 (Part 1); September 30, 2011 (Part 2)
- Running time: Part 1: 144 minutes Part 2: 132 minutes Both: 276 minutes Single version: 150 minutes
- Country: Taiwan
- Languages: Seediq; Japanese; Taiwanese Hokkien
- Budget: NT$700–750 million (US$23–25 million)
- Box office: NT$880 million (US$29 million)

Warriors of the Rainbow: Seediq Bale (Seediq: Seediq Bale; literally Real Seediq or Real Men; Chinese: 賽德克·巴萊; pinyin: Sàidékè Bālái) is a 2011 Taiwanese historical drama film written and directed by Wei Te-sheng and produced by John Woo, based on the 1930 Musha Incident in central Taiwan.

The full version of the film shown in Taiwan is divided into two parts—Part 1 is called "太陽旗" (The Sun Flag), and Part 2 is called "彩虹橋" (The Rainbow Bridge), running a total of 4 hours and 36 minutes. However, the original two parts of the film were combined into the single international cut; its run time was 2 hours and 30 minutes. The film is the most expensive production in Taiwanese cinema history. The film has also been compared to the 1995 film Braveheart by Mel Gibson and The Last of the Mohicans by the media in Taiwan.

The film was shown in competition at the 68th Venice International Film Festival and was selected as a contender for nomination for the 84th Academy Awards for Best Foreign Language Film in 2011. It was one of nine films shortlisted to advance to the next round of voting for nomination.

== Plot ==
Warriors of the Rainbow depicts the Wushe Incident, which occurred near Qilai Mountain of Taiwan under Japanese rule. Mona Rudao, a chief of Mehebu village of Seediq people, led warriors fighting against the Japanese.

=== Part I ===
The film begins with a hunt by a mountain river in Taiwan. Two Bunun men are hunting a boar, but they are attacked by a group led by young Mona Rudao of Seediq people. Mona Rudao invades the territory, kills one of them and takes away the boar.

In 1895, China cedes Taiwan to Japan via the Treaty of Shimonoseki. The Japanese invasion of Taiwan ends with Japan defeating Han Chinese resistance. Japanese military officials see the natives as an obstacle to the resources of Taiwan. Later a team of Japanese surveyors are attacked by natives. The attack leads to a battle between Japanese and natives, including Mona Rudao, on a cliff trail. On his way to trade with Han Chinese off the mountain, Mona Rudao also feuds with Temu Walis, a Seediq young man from Toda group. The Japanese ban people from trading with Mona Rudao, and collaborate with a group of Bunun to get Mona Rudao's men drunk and ambush them when they are asleep. After some battles (the 1902 人止關 and 1903 姊妹原), Rudao Luhe, Mona Rudao's father, is injured. Their village, Mahebu, and neighboring villages fall under the control of the Japanese.

Twenty years pass. Mahebu and other villages are forced to abolish the custom of keeping the heads they have hunted. Men are subject to low-wage logging jobs and prohibited from carrying guns they own, and from traditional animal and human hunting. Women work in houses of the Japanese and give up the traditional weaving work. Children, including Pawan Nawi, attend school in Wushe village. Men buy alcohol and medicine from a grocery owned by a Han man, who the men hold a grudge against as they are now in debt. Above all, they are forbidden to tattoo their faces, because to earn that tattoo the young men must kill an enemy and take their head. The tattoo is believed to be the requirement for Seediq people to "go to the other side across the Rainbow Bridge" after death. There are also young people such as Dakis Nomin, Dakis Nawi, Obing Nawi and Obing Tadao, who adopt Japanese names, education and life style and attempt to work and live among Japanese. The Japanese, except a few, are not aware of the tension.

In late autumn of 1930, the village of Mona Rudao holds a wedding for a young couple. Mona Rudao goes hunting for the wedding and quarrels for hunting ground with Temu Walis, who is hunting with Japanese policeman, Kojima Genji, and his son. At the wedding, Yoshimura, a newly appointed and nervous Japanese policeman, inspects the village. Mona Rudao's first son, Tado Mona, offers to share his homebrewed millet wine with Yoshimura, but Yoshimura considers the beer unsanitary as it is fermented with saliva, and Tado Mona's hands are also covered in blood from an animal he has just slaughtered. A fight with Tado Mona and his brother Baso Mona ensues. The fight is stopped, but Yoshimura fears for his life and threatens to punish the whole village. Later Mona Rudao tries to mend relations with Yoshimura, who refuses to accept the apology. Young men, including Piho Sapo from Hogo village, see the mass punishment as unacceptable and urge Mona Rudao to start war with the Japanese. Mona Rudao tells them that it is impossible to win, but accepts that the war is unavoidable and decides to fight.

In a few days Mona Rudao calls on villages with pacts to join forces. They schedule to attack the Japanese on October 27, when Japanese will attend a sports game (in memory of Prince Kitashirakawa Yoshihisa) and gather on the schoolyard of the Wushe Village. The women, including Mona Rudao's first daughter, Mahung Mona, know the men are planning for a war and are saddened by the prospect.

Dakis Nomin, a young man who adopted the Japanese name Hanaoka Ichiro and became a police officer, notices that Mona Rudao is preparing for war. He comes to a waterfall and tries to persuade Mona Rudao not to start the war, instead Mona Rudao persuades him to collaborate. After Dakis Nomin leaves, Mona Rudao sings with the ghost of Rudao Luhe and determines to start the war. In the night before, Mahung Mona tries to seduce her husband, which would break a tribal rule and prohibit him from going to war the next day. The natives attack the police outposts. Mona Rudao then rallies young men from village to village, and at last chief Tadao Nogan of Hogo village agrees to join Mona Rudao. Everyone is clear about the outcome of the war: the death of the native warriors is certain, but they are willing to fight anyway, because only a warrior with blood on his hand can enter the "land of their ancestors". The combined warriors decide to rather fight and die in honour, rather than live in shame.

On October 27 the attack takes place as scheduled, with the killing of all Japanese men, women, and children. Pawan Nawi and other boys kill their Japanese teacher and his family. Obing Nawi, a woman who wears Japanese clothes, is spared only because her husband Dakis Nomin covers her with a native cloth. Obing Tadao, who is daughter of chief Tadao Nogan and who also wears Japanese clothes, survives by hiding in a storage room. Han people such as the grocer are spared during the attack. Native people attack the police station and take the guns kept in the building. One Japanese police officer escapes and tells the outside world about the attack. The film ends with Mona Rudao sitting in the schoolyard which is full of bodies.

=== Part II ===
The second film begins with Dakis Nomin and Dakis Nawi writing their last words on the wall, showing their ambivalence. When the news of war breaks open, policeman Kojima Genji is threatened by the natives, but convinces Temu Walis and his men to side with Japan. The colonial government sees the uprising as a major crisis, and sends Major General Kamada Yahiko with a force of 3,000 police and soldiers to fight the 300 men on Mona Rudao's side. Pawan Nawi and other boys earn their face tattoos. In a woods some people begin to commit mass suicide, Dakis Nomin, his wife Obing Nawi, and infant son Dakis Nawi among them.

General Kamada is furious with the stalemate and orders the use of illegal poison gas bombs against the natives. Kojima Genji sets bounties on men, women and children in Mona Rudao's village, and orders Temu Walis and his men to fight Mona Rudao.

The battle turns against Mona Rudao's side, many of his men are killed by poison gas and Temu Walis' men. Mona Rudao's people lose the village to the Japanese and other natives and retreat to caves. Pawan Nawi and the boys feel desperate and ask to fight side by side with Mona Rudao. Mona Rudao asks them to recite their creation story in which the first man and first woman are formed from a tree that is half stone half wood.

In the retreat the women kill the children then hang themselves on trees to conserve food for the warriors. Piho Sapo also helped his injured relative, Piho Walis, to hang himself. Temu Walis is shaken when he sees the hanged women, and claims that he fights for his own sake not for Kojima.

Mona Rudao and his men launch a desperate attack on the Japanese force occupying the Mahebu village. Baso Mona is injured and asks his brother to kill him. Pawan Nawi and the boys die fighting. Meanwhile, in a river, Temu Walis and his men are ambushed by Piho Sapo and other men. Before he dies, Temu Walis hallucinates that he is fighting a young Mona Rudao.

When Mona Rudao sees the fight is near the end, he gives leadership to Tado Mona, and returns to his wife and children (the movie implies two versions of the story, one is that Mona Rudao shot his wife, the other is that the wife hanged herself). Some people of the village surrender and survive. Natives present and identify heads of the dead to the Japanese leadership for rewards, and it is shown that in the battle they feud with each other even further. Mahung Mona is resuscitated by the Japanese, and is sent to offer Tado Mona's men wine and a chance to surrender. The men take the wine, and sing and dance with the women, but refuse to surrender. Tado Mona tells Mahung Mona to give birth to and raise offspring, and leads men to hang themselves in woods. Piho Sapo is captured and tortured to death. The war ends, and even Kamada is impressed by his enemy's spirit. The surviving people of the villages that rebel are removed from their homes, and are later attacked by Kojima. Mona Rudao is missing, and a native hunter is led by a bird to find his body. The hunter then sees Mona Rudao and his people following the Seediq legend to cross the rainbow bridge. The film ends with a scene of several natives telling their creation story.

== Cast ==
- Nolay Piho (林慶台, Lin Ching-tai) as Mona Rudao: Mona Rudao is the protagonist. The character deviates from the real historical figure significantly. The movie character is described as a calm, authoritative and mature Seediq Tgdaya village chief of Mahebu. He lived under Japanese rule for 30 years and had been to Japan. He understands Japan's power, but thinks it brings Seediq people no good, and insists on maintaining their own culture. In history, Mona Rudao did not participate in some of the battles described in the film. Whereas he was famous, he was one of many leaders in the uprising. There are controversies over the film's depiction of Mona Rudao shooting his wife and children. In 2010 some Seediq people held a forum and said that it is impossible for Mona Rudao to do such a thing as it is forbidden by the "gaya" custom. The director responded that he changed the scene to make the situation ambiguous. There are also controversies of whether Mona Rudao is depicted as a hero. Nolay Piho is a 51-year-old Presbyterian minister from Nan-ao, Yilan. Nolay is of Atayal origin. Nolay is not a professional actor, nor does he speak Seediq or Japanese language. Nolay used Romanization and Chinese characters to memorize his lines. It was difficult for him to act and the mood on site was tense. He had a heart attack during the shooting. In addition, Lin is shorter than the character. Lin also starred in a short the director made about going to Venice for film festival. The movie brought Lin much publicity and appearance but he said he still wants to be a minister. Nolay appeared in two more films and a TV series as of today. He once moved to a village in Wulai, Taipei to support a local legal dispute.
- Yuki Daki (大慶, Da Ching) as Mona Rudao (young): The younger Mona Rudao is described as a tall, athletic and aggressive man. Yuki Daki is a 34 years old male model of Atayal origin.
- Umin Boya (馬志翔) as Temu Walis: Temu Walis is described as a lifelong enemy of Mona Rudao, and he is forced to collaborate with Japanese. Umin Boya is a TV actor with Seediq origin from Yuli, Hualien. Umin has starred in several series by Taiwan Public Television Service, including the role of Dakis Nomin in the period drama Danu Sakura. In promotion, director Wei commented that Temu Walis' collaboration with Japanese is controversial, and the character has long been depicted as negative, and Wei cast Umin Boya to use his positive image. Umin said in promotion that he is from the Toda group of Temu Walis and he is glad to play the part. Ma later directed the movie Kano produced by Wei.
- Pawan Nawi (曾秋勝, Zeng Qiusheng) as Rudao Luhe, Mona Rudao's father. Pawan also served as translator and coach for the Seediq language.
- Umin Walis (林源傑, Lin Yuan-jie) as Pawan Nawi: Pawan Nawi is a young boy of Mahebu village. He and other boys grow up under Japanese rule, earn face tattoos and die in the uprising. The character seems to be based on a memoir of an elder. However Dakis Pawan, a consultant of the movie, strongly doubted the existence of such a group of boys. Umin Walis is a junior high school student and a member of school wrestling team. He is of Atayal origin from Ren-ai, Nantou.
- Yakau Kuhon (田駿, Tian Jun) as Tado Mona: Tado Mona is Mona Rudao's first son. The character wears the darker cloth.
- Pawan Neyung (李世嘉, Lee Shih-chia) as Baso Mona: Baso Mona is Mona Rudao's second son.
- Pihu Nawi (張志偉, Chang Chih-wei) as Biho Sapo: Biho Sapo is a historical young man from Hogo village neighboring Mahebu village of Mona Rudao. The record suggests that he may not be as influential as described in the film. In the film the character encourages Mona Rudao and Hogo village to fight Japanese, fights with Mona Rudao and later kills Temu Walis.
- Masanobu Andō (安藤政信) as Kojima Genji (小島源治): Kojima Genji is a Japanese police who is once friendly toward the natives and tries to learn the language, but he becomes hostile after his family is killed by the natives. Historically, Kojima is responsible for the massacres of the natives who survived the war.
- Kawahara Sabu (河原佐武) as General Kamada Yahiko (鎌田弥彦).
- Kimura Yuichi (木村祐一) as Satsuka Ayu (佐塚愛祐): a police officer in Wushe.
- Landy Wen (溫嵐, AKA Yungai Hayung) as Mahung Mona: She is a daughter of Mona Rudao and a mother of two. Landy Wen is a popular singer of Atayal origin from Jianshi, Hsinchu.
- Bokeh Kosang (徐詣帆) as Dakis Nomin: Dakis Nomin, or Hanaoka Ichiro (花岡一郎), is a Seediq Tgdaya man who adopts Japanese education and name, and works as a policeman. Historically, the man did not participate the October 27 attack. Later he and his relatives committed suicide, and the suicide was widely reported by the colonial media. Bokeh Kosang is a stage and TV actor of Truku origin from Hualien. Bokeh joined Chinese singing competition Chinese Idol and got disqualified.
- Yokuy Utaw (羅美玲) as Obing Nawi: Obing Nawi, or Kawano Hanako (川野花子), is a Seediq Tgadaya woman who also adopts Japanese education, name, and work. She is from Dakis Nomin's village, and knew him from childhood, becomes his wife, and lets him kill her after the school attack. Yokuy Utaw is a singer and actress with Atayal origin from Jianshi, Hsinchu.
- Vivian Hsu (徐若瑄, AKA Bidai Syulan) as Obing Tadao: Obing Tadao, or Takayama Hatsuko (高山初子) is a cousin of Kawano Hanako, and they share a similar background. In history the woman survived the war and the two massacres after the war. Hsu is a singer and actor with Atayal origin, and has a career in Japan.
- Chie Tanaka as Kojima Matsuno: Kojima Matsuno (小島松野) is Kojima's wife. The woman and her children are killed in October 27 attack. Chie Tanaka (田中千繪) is a Japanese actress who collaborated with Wei Te-sheng before in Cape No. 7.
- Cheng Chih-wei (鄭志偉) as Wu Jindun (巫金墩): The Han Chinese grocer on Wushe. Cheng collaborated with Wei Te-sheng before in Cape No. 7.
- Ma Ju-lung: A Han Chinese grocer off the mountains. Ma Ju-lung (馬如龍) is an actor of earlier Taiwanese films, and collaborated with Wei Te-sheng before in Cape No. 7.

== Production ==
=== Development ===
According to an interview in Hong Kong, Wei's idea to make the movie began in 1996, when he watched a news story about an aboriginal group demanding the government to return some lands. Wei then saw the next story questioning whether the sovereignty over Hong Kong should return to China or Republic of China. Wei found this ironic, and the next day he went to a bookstore to read about aborigines. There he found Chiu Ruo-lung (Chinese: 邱若龍; pinyin: Qiu Ruolung)'s comic book on the Wushe Incident. Wei became interested in chief Mona Rudao and his motives. Wei then wrote and revised a screenplay, and looked up historical background.

In 2000 Wei finished the screenplay, which won the Excellent Film Screenplay Award from Government Information Office (GIO). In 2003, Wei raised NTD 2.5 million, which he used to shoot a five-minute demonstration film. The film was sounded by Tu Du-chih, edited by Bowen Chen (both are awards winning filmmakers, and both later also worked on the complete film). The short was starred by actor Liao Chin-sheng (廖金生), actress Tseng Yu-chun (曾玉春) and others. His goal was to raise USD 7 million (about NTD 250 million), which is rather expensive for Taiwanese movies at the time. (Later Wei said his wife supported his decision to spend 2 million on the short film when the crew was against him) The screening failed to raise money, and Wei's family met difficulty, but Wei insisted his budget to be NTD 200 million.

According to an interview in 2008, director Chen Kuo-fu told Wei that in order to earn investors' trust, Wei should make another film first. So Wei turned to make Cape No. 7. In Cape No. 7 Wei chose non-famous actors, a story with multiple lines, and colonial period references to demonstrate the feasibility of these three elements. Chiu Ruo-lung also came to work with Wei as art (costume) designer on this film and Seediq Bale.

The success of Cape No. 7 brought Wei money and fame, and Wei restarted promotion for Warriors of the Rainbow. But fundraising was still difficult. In 2009, Wei suggested the difficulty is that though the success of Cape No. 7 attracted investors who are new to the filmmaking business, they were not comfortable with uncertainty involved. In 2011 Wei looked back and said: "I quickly realized that potential investors were looking more for Cape No. 8 than Seediq Bale." The investors were skeptical of the subject of Seediq Bale, and doubted if the success of Cape No. 7 can be repeated.

Teng Sue-feng in a report in February 2009 suggested that the budget of the film is "NTD 330 million", and that "Wei already has almost a third of" this budget. Teng points out that, besides the profit from ticket sales, Cape No. 7 also earned Wei a subsidy of about 104 million from Government Information Office for the next film. In May 2009, the casting met difficulties of finding aboriginal extras and actors for a war epic. The government made a special arrangement to allow 20 enlisted men to act in the movie. At the time the film was set to be released in mid-2010.

However Typhoon Morakot impacted Taiwan in August 2009. Tu Duu-chih said the typhoon destroyed the film's set and sent the estimated budget from NTD 200 million to 600 million. By November 2011, Peng reported the budget to be 700 million, and the grant from GIO was 130 million.

=== Filming ===
The crew built a set in Arrow Studio in Linkou, New Taipei City to recreate scenes of Wushe Village in the 1930s. Taneda Yohei is the artistic director supervising the art team. The set had 36 houses. Some houses had interior decoration and props of the period. The set cost NT$80 million. After the filming was completed, the set was open to visitors for a while.

The filming hired 400 technicians from Japan, Taiwan, and Hong Kong, and hired 1,500 non-professional as actors. The filming began in October 2009, took 10 months and was completed on 5 September 2010. Other problems include keeping actors in shape for continuity and adjusting the wardrobes to protect privacy. Chin Ting-chang is the director of cinematography who worked with Wei on several movies. Chin said he chose to use "Hollywood way" to shoot the epic in many short takes, which provide more choices for editing and reduce risk of failure. Chin also designed the use of wire cam which is said to be the first in Taiwanese cinema. The sound recording and design were by Tu Duu-chih and Tang Hsiang-chu (湯湘竹). Foo Sing-choong (胡陞忠) is supervisor of digital effects and worked with Beijing's Crystal CG on this movie. Originally a Korean company was hired for the job but the company bankrupted so the job was switched to Crystal CG instead, and many complained about the result. Korean crew include Yang Gil-yeong (양길영, AKA Yang Kil Yong, 梁吉泳), Shim Jae-won (심재원 沈在元) who are action directors and nominated by Golden Horse Award, and Yi Chi Yun (李治允) who is a supervisor of special effects. Yang and Shim hired Korean stunt crew at first, but later switched to Chinese crew which is cheaper. However Chinese crew has a shorter working permit so they switched to Taiwan crew for the rest. Korean firm Cel Art provided body parts props. Many original music scores are composed by Singaporean composer Rick Ho with a price of NTD 7 million. The lyrics were written by Wei and Jiang Zide and later translated. The movie script was originally written in Chinese, and translated into Seediq by Iwan Nawi and Dakis Pawan. Iwan Nawi later published her translation of the script. Dakis Pawan is also credited for the translation of the script, and recorded his pronunciation of the lines for coaching. Dakis Pawan, Iwan Perin and Zeng Qiusheng (actor of Rudao Luhe) coached the cast with the language, and served as translators on shooting site.

Some scenes were filmed on mountain slope or in river, with actors wearing little cloths. Rain, coldness, slippery slopes and running were challenging to both the crew and cast. Injuries were frequent. Financing problems were also constant. Wei said that he had to direct the film and raise the money at the same time, and the company often ran out of money for payrolls and props. There were reports that the film could never be finished. Polly Peng reports that: "Wei's film company frequently couldn't pay the crew on time [...] the Taiwanese scenic designers went on strike, the Korean action team just left, and the Japanese art team refused to hand over completed designs...." In 2010, the Central Motion Picture Corporation under Gou Tai-chiang, invested 350 million and was said to end financial difficulty. In 2023, Wei and CMPC disputed this investment. Taiwanese celebrities including Jay Chou, Jerry Yan, Chang Hsiao-yen and Doze Niu also invested, and were acknowledged in the credits.

The film hired many non-professional actors, including for the main character of young and older Mona Rudao. The film's use of Japanese and Seediq language was also a challenge to non-professional actors.

== Release ==
On 2 September 2011, Warriors of the Rainbow had its world premiere at the 68th Venice International Film Festival, but the original two parts are combined into the one cut version and its running time is two and half hours. It also was shown at the 2011 Toronto International Film Festival in September. A controversy began when the film was listed as "China, Taiwan", and widened into political arguments when Chinese reporters criticized the film and Taiwanese defended it.

On September 4, the film held its premiere of Part 1 in Taiwan at Ketagalan Boulevard. On September 7, the director held a small-scale screening of Part 1 and Part 2 in Qingliu, Ren-ai, Nantou to keep an earlier promise with local people. (Japanese government moved the survivors of the rebellious villages to this place). The nationwide release of Part 1 was on September 9, and Part 2 on September 30.

By 22 November 2011, its box office in Taiwan reached NTD 880 million (USD 29m).

The film opened 27 April 2012 in the US in New York, Los Angeles, and the San Francisco Bay Area.

The film premiered in Beijing on 6 May 2012, and released nationwide on 10. Chinese online reviews find the battle scenes moving, and identify with the people's faith. On the test-screening in Guangzhou, Wei said the Chinese version is the 2.5 hours long new international version, not the version screened in Venice Film Festival. Wei said that the version is not incomplete. Wei said that the Taiwan version has to be longer to respond to domestic demand for more historical details, while the international version can be shorter and focuses on the story. Wei also noted that the 4.5 hours long version was not successful in Hong Kong commercially. Beside, the soundtrack of Japanese and Seediq dialogue is kept without re-dubbing. Zheng Zhaokui (郑照魁) from Nanfang Daily however commented that 2.5 hours international version is not as satisfying as the 4.5 hours full version, and many aspects of the story were reduced. Zheng also noted that audience found the suicide of Seediq women heavy. The DVD release is delayed to wait for screening in China.

In Japan, the film premiered in March 2012 on a film festival. Wider screening began on 20 April 2013.

In South Korea, the movies were screened in 5 theaters in 2014. Only about 8000 people saw the part one, and 10 the part two. Lim Dae-Guen noted that the films received relatively high score on portal website Naver. Lim argued that the most Korean audience are unfamiliar with Taiwanese history and ethnic groups, but the few who have seen it rated the movie positively, both for its quality and for their identification with its anti-Japanese theme.

In 2023, CMPC claimed to own the copyright of this movie. Wei on the other hand filed a lawsuit against CMPC and disputed the investment contract.

== Reception ==
=== Critical response ===
Early reaction to the movie has noted both the realism of its violence (which is due to the historical accuracy of its depictions of battle), and its undertone of Taiwanese nationalism. A review in The Economist avers that the film "[q]uite probably... has the highest number of graphic beheadings of any film anywhere. But they are faithful historical depictions." As Walter Russell Mead further commented, "This type of movie, done well, can inspire whole societies with nationalist pride, reinforce the prominence of folk heroes (including, quite often, violent ones), and strengthen a people's togetherness at the expense of foreigners." Chen Wen from Shanghai Morning Post reported that the premiere was not liked and commented that "Blood-thirst doesn't make an epic." Chen commented that the film is too long and the depiction of Seediq violence weakened the righteousness of resistance. Chen associated this with Wei's ambivalence toward Japan. Producer John Woo explained on conference that Wei used the violence to depict the "original Seediq culture and history," and Wei said the war in the movie seeks only dignity, freedom and death. Wei said that his shots of cruelty is to remind people. Later comments by Taiwanese and Chinese reports involved cross-strait politics. Voice of America reported that Chinese media criticized the movie for having violence over substance and Taiwanese media and netizens defended emotionally, and the response escalated the hostility. Chen Weizhi, a lecturer, said that the director was responsible if the Chinese reporters misunderstood the film. Chen also noted that the controversy was politicized. Chen and Ifeng.com both commented that the film may suffer from a Chinese nationalist attitude to demonize Japanese with stereotypes like other Chinese epics. Jiang Zhileng of China Times responded that the criticism from mainland media only increased mainland Chinese netizens' interest. Jiang noted that a netizen said the movie would be associated with conflicts in Tibet and Xinjiang if it is screened in China.

Justin Chang of Variety describes the film as a "wildly ambitious rumble-in-the-jungle battle epic arrives bearing so heavy a burden of industry expectations, one wishes the results were less kitschy and more coherent", but "still, the filmmaking has a raw physicality and crazy conviction it's hard not to admire." Chang also writes "In terms of recent epic cinema, the primitive warfare in Warriors of the Rainbow recalls that of Apocalypto, minus Mel Gibson's sense of pacing and technique" and the "chaotic combo of hard-slamming edits, gory mayhem and Ricky Ho's forever-hemorrhaging score makes the picture simply exhausting to watch over the long haul." On the positive aspects, Chang noted "there's an impressive degree of variation and anthropological detail in the weaponry and fighting techniques, from the numerous implied decapitations (the Seediq's chief m.o.) to the guerrilla assaults in the tropical terrain they know so well." Chang however criticized the film's use of special effects as "generally substandard throughout" and writes the "occasional shots of CGI rainbows -- that title is unfortunately literal -- send the film momentarily spiraling into camp."

The film pits native ferocity (rarely have I seen a film with so many beheadings) and scenes of more peaceful, communal living (the eerily beautiful Seediq songs, part of the tribe's ancestral storytelling, are spellbinding) against this historical event little-known in the West.

— Marc Savlov, writing for The Austin Chronicle

Deborah Young of The Hollywood Reporter describes the film as "stunning to look at, authentic to a fault and a little tedious to follow", and praised the action set pieces as "spectacular, almost non-stop sequence of grisly hand-to-hand combat scenes" and "No martial arts here, but skillfully realistic fighting with spears and machetes, guns and cannons, which spare no one." However Young also states that "no matter how ingeniously it is varied, the non-stop fighting becomes oppressive in the long run" and the film's best scenes are in its "quieter moments". Alan Harris gave the film three out of five stars and states "This is an extremely bloodthirsty film, with more beheadings than any other movie I can name, and scenes of carnage for most of its two and a half hour running time." However Harris states "The story does not like complexity – the Japanese are almost universally portrayed as strutting hiss-boo villains or as hapless cannon fodder." Stephen Holden of New York Times criticizes the film: "the pacing . . . is clumsy, its battle scenes chaotic and its computer effects (especially of a fire that ravages the Seediq hunting forest) cheesy".

Later the film screened in China with another international version. Zheng Zhaokui (郑照魁) from Nanfang Daily compared this version to the complete version and commented that it is short on Seediq culture thus loses the depth. Zheng also noted that audience found the suicide of Seediq women heavy.

Critic Ryan Cheng (鄭秉泓) praised the movie for starting discussion for history of Taiwan, and commented that the scene of Mona Rudao singing was the most uplifting part, comparing it to Hollywood movie Field of Dreams. Zheng then criticized the movie for lack of human warmth, and criticized the mass suicide scene for being rushed. Zheng also criticized the score composer for lack of knowledge in the music of Taiwanese aboriginals. Writer Chuang Hua-tang pointed out many the movie's deviations from history, such as Mona Rudao didn't participate some battles, and that the character Pawan Nawi is fictional. Chuang then compared the movie to an earlier TV series Dana Sakura, and praising the latter for the respect to facts and more balanced treatment of characters. Chuang reminded that the movie is not documentary and it wouldn't harm or affect the relations of ethnic groups in real life.

Much attention is paid to the epic-film style, investment, and box office of the film, as Wei's last film Cape No.7 and this film were viewed as signs of revival of Taiwanese film industry.

Beijing based film critic Yuwen Ge noted that contrary to the assumption that the movie is supported by "nostalgia" of Taiwanese audience, he saw that many people are unfamiliar with this history, and wish to "catch up", so the support then supposedly comes from an awakening local identity. He pointed out that the film follows the anti-colonial formula, but takes a neutral stance. He feels that Mona Rudao is not glorified, and the Seediq killing is depicted as guilty and demonic, and the Japanese as victims. But he then comments that this is not a simple "pro-Japanese" attitude which many think Taiwanese hold, but a result of a post-colonial culture. Yuwen raised the issue of identity, and argued that Hanaoka Ichiro and Jiro are used to Japanese lifestyle but cannot blend into Japanese society. Yuwen argued that the character is an allegory of ex-colonial people, who are used to advanced civilization, refuse to return to the backward native culture, and don't know where to go. Yuwen mentioned that the new generation of Taiwanese identify with China less, and Yuwen further argues that Hanaoka Ichiro is "projection of contemporary Taiwanese's self-image."

Chinese media reports lamented the marketing failure of the film in China and its implication to Chinese speaking films. Noted failures include the short and insincere promotion, the 2012 April release clashed with blockbuster The Avengers and others, and the widespread idea that the 2.5 hours "International Version" is censored and incomplete.

Film critic Li Jian who said the Part 2 is too simplified and the ambivalent and interesting characters ended hastily. Li said the most important theme is the comparison between civilization and barbarism. Li compared the headhunting in the beginning to Mel Gibson's Apocalypto, and suggested a paradox: Do the Japanese colonizers bring civilization to Seediqs and end their cruel barbarism, or do Seediqs have their ground of civilization, and the Japanese civilization has gone the wrong way? Li referred to different waves of colonialism in history, and argued that "freedom is the core of civilization." Li suggested that both Mona Rudao and Kamada share the consensus that the Japanese oppression is not civilized. However Li also suggested that the issue of Seediq women's freedom is neglected in the movie.

=== Controversy ===
There were controversies about the accuracy of the film's representation of history and aboriginal culture. Dakis Pawan (a Seediq man, also known as Kuo Ming-cheng), the film's consultant, published a book that recognizes the efforts of the filming crew and their needs for dramatization, and that lists many deviations of the film from his studies of history. . The final attack to take back Mahebu village, for example, is fictional. Dakis Pawan also traced the origin of the story of some Seediq boys, on which the characters of Pawan Nawi and his group of boys were based, to a memoir of an elder, and then expressed his doubts on the existence of these boys.

The film's view on aboriginal individuals and tribes is controversial. After the film's release, Apple Daily reported that an Atayal elder said that a year before the Wushe Incident there was the Qingshan Incident, in which Mona Rudao collaborated with the Japanese and attacked his village. The elder "said Mona Rudao was not a hero as described in the movie but a brutal man who killed 26 women, children and old people in the attack." Walis Pelin, a former lawmaker, and Chiu Hung-shui, a chairman of a local organization from Nantou, confirmed the elder's story, and added that Mona Rudao was forced under the Japanese policy of "using barbarians against barbarians." However Dakis Pawan "quoted a spokeswoman for the Mona Rudao family and the chief's foster-daughter as saying that she had never heard of the Qingshan Incident."

Ian Inkster, a professor in Taiwan, argued that the movie simplified the role of aboriginal women during the incident, for example they are not shown to be drinking or fighting. Inkster also argued that it downplayed how Han Chinese settlers impacted the natives in the longer period, and concluded that the film should not be seen as a symbol of the present Taiwanese national protest against China.

There were worries that Temu Walis and the Toda people’s place in history are simplified. In a 2011 talk show, Watan Nomin, a young student from Toda group, said that the conflicts between the Seediq tribes are not only a result of tradition, but are also influenced by the Japanese policy of setting up a "frontier guard line" (隘勇線) in the area.

On a forum conference, Watan, a TV reporter from Toda group, criticized the movie for not describing the "gaya" custom of the people, and for its changes and mistakes of the historical details. In addition, Watan argues that the trauma among Seediq people is too sensitive to be filmed, and the movie should address the aspect of peace and reconciliation. Chenzhang Peilun (陳張培倫), a professor, noted that people are moved by the movie but don't relate the movie to aboriginal people's current situation.

The representation of Seediq culture is controversial. A letter to a newspaper expressed concerns about the gore and violence depicted in the movie may hurt the image of Aboriginal people. In a talk show, Dakis Pawan, Shen Mingren (AKA Pawan Tanah, a school principal) and others responded that the movie does not represent Seediq people, and the killings has to be understood in the context of history, national defense and Seediq custom (called "gaga"). Iwan Pering, a translator of the film, said many details of customs and history are incorrect, and that Mona Rudao was unlikely to have invaded other group's territory and take the game, since it was forbidden by the rules of his group. Dakis Pawan also said in his book that Seediq rules were strict and group-centered, therefore Seediq people were unlikely to act as freely and self-centered as in the film. In particular, Mona Rudao was unlikely to feud with Temu Walis in the way shown in the film.

=== Accolades ===
The film was shown in competition at the 68th Venice International Film Festival and was selected as a contender for nomination for the 84th Academy Awards for Best Foreign Language Film in 2011 and was one of nine films shortlisted to advance to the next round of voting for nomination.

At the 2011 Golden Horse Awards, the film won Best Feature Film and Audience Choice Award, Bokeh Kosang (Hsu Yi-fan) won Best Supporting Actor, Ricky Ho won Best Original Film Score, Tu Du-chih, Tang Hsiang-chu, and Wu Shu-yao won Best Sound Effects. Wong Wei-liu, the key grip, won Outstanding Taiwanese Filmmaker of the Year.

== See also ==
- Taiwanese aborigines
- Taiwan under Japanese rule
- Mona Rudao
- Musha Incident
