= Wushe Incident Memorial Park =

Memorial park in Ren'ai, Nantou County, Taiwan

- 霧社事件紀念公園
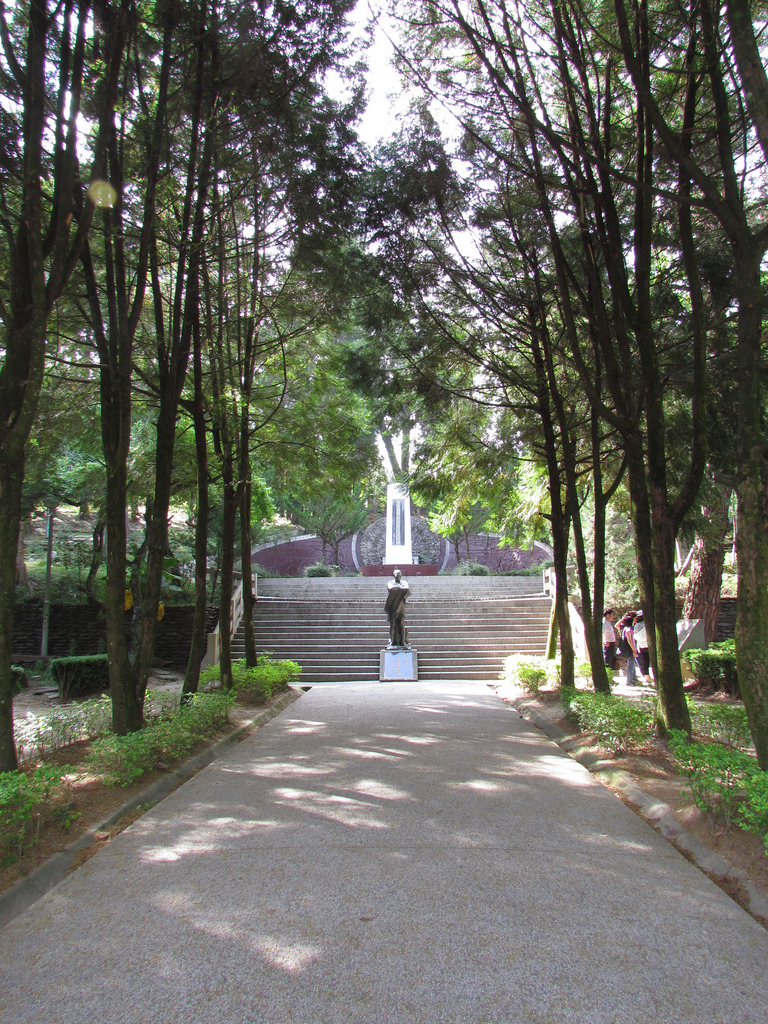
- Interactive map of Wushe Incident Memorial Park

Details
- Location: Ren'ai, Nantou County, Taiwan
- Coordinates: 24°01′13.6″N 121°07′57.4″E
- Type: memorial park

The Wushe Incident Memorial Park (traditional Chinese: 霧社事件紀念公園; simplified Chinese: 雾社事件纪念公园; pinyin: Wùshè Shìjiàn Jìniàn Gōngyuán) is a memorial park in Ren'ai Township, Nantou County, Taiwan commemorating the Musha Incident in 1930.

== History ==
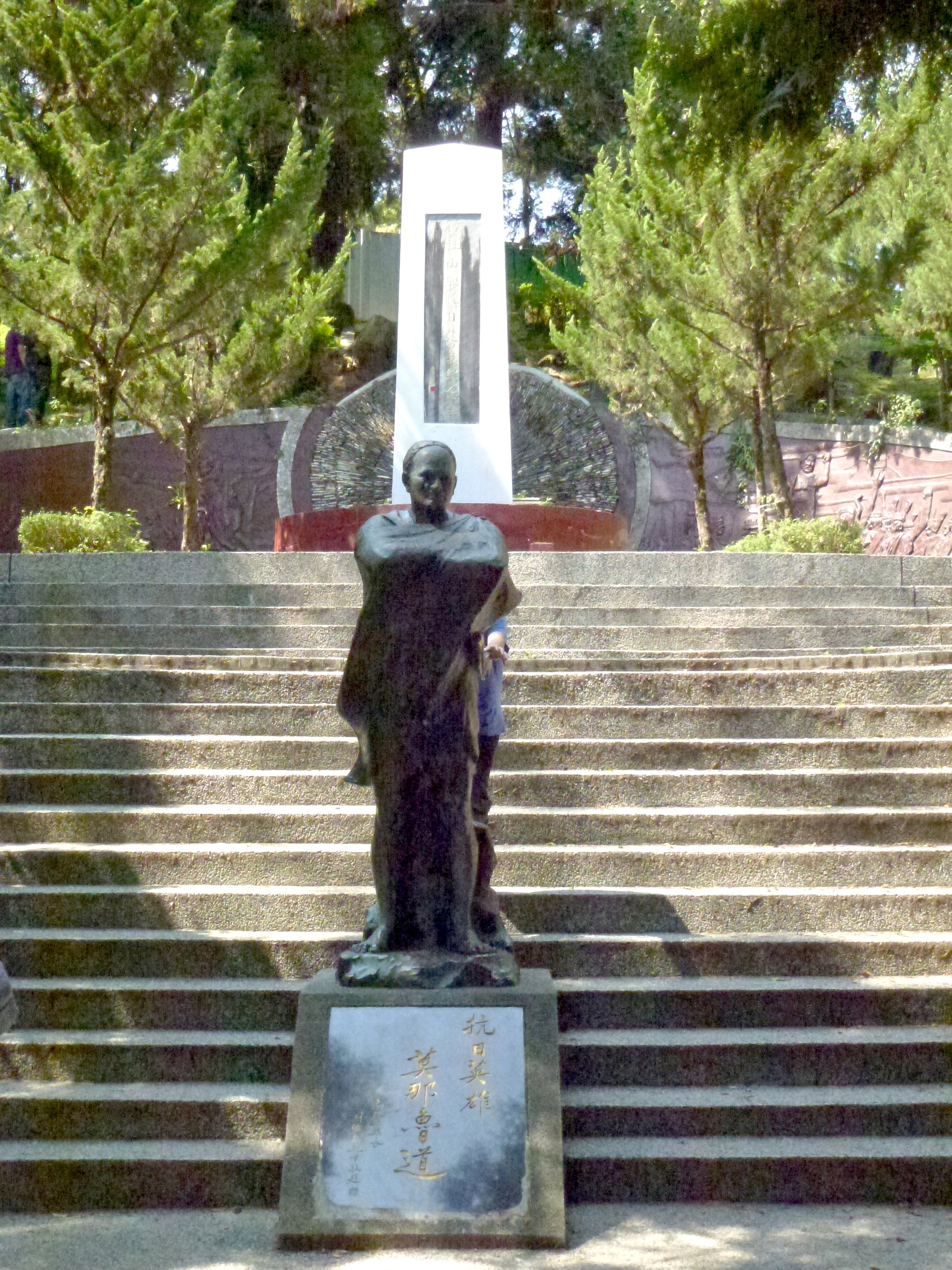
A closeup of the statue

The park was set up by the government to commemorate the Seediq people who perished during the incident. One of the notable tomb in the park belongs to Mona Rudao, which was erected in 1974.

== See also ==
- List of tourist attractions in Taiwan
