= Beipu uprising =

1907 armed uprising against Japanese rule of Taiwan

Beipu Uprising
Date	November 1907
Location	Hoppo, Shinchiku Chō, Taiwan
Result	Japanese victory

Belligerents
Hakka; Saisiyat	Japan

Commanders and leaders
Tsai Ching-lin	(Empire of Japan) Sakuma Samata

Casualties and losses
~100 killed	57 killed

Beipu uprising

Chinese name
- Chinese: 北埔事件
Transcriptions
Standard Mandarin
- Hanyu Pinyin: Běipǔ Shìjiàn
- Wade–Giles: Pei3-p'u3 Shih4-chien4

Japanese name
- Kanji: 北埔事件
- Hiragana: ほっぽじけん
Transcriptions
- Romanization: Hoppo Jiken

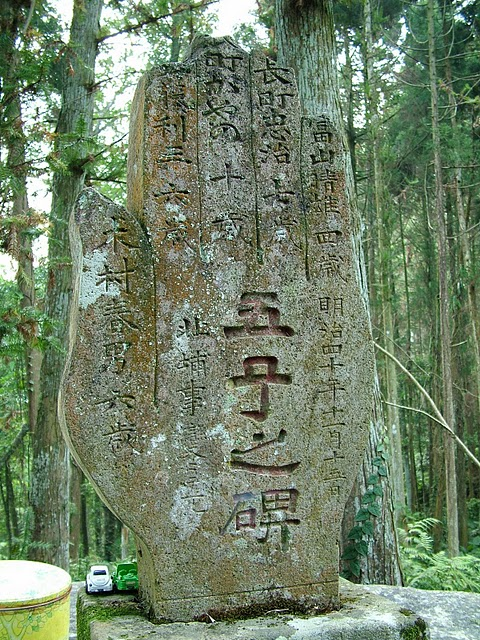
"Memorial stone to Five Japanese Children who were Slaughtered" (五子碑紀念被屠殺日本幼童)

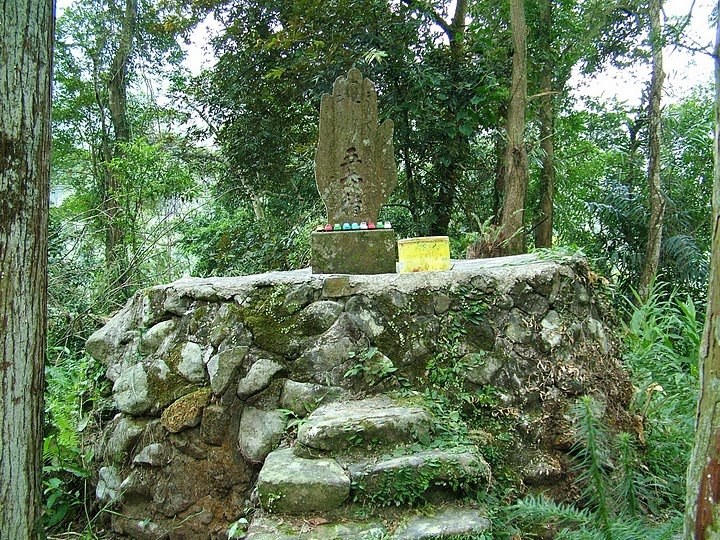
"Monument to Five Children" (五子碑及其石製基座)

The Beipu Incident (Chinese: 北埔事件), or the Beipu Uprising, in 1907 was the first instance of an armed local uprising against the Japanese rule of the island of Taiwan. In response to oppression of the local population by the Japanese authorities, a group of insurgents from the Hakka subgroup of Han Chinese and Saisiyat indigenous group in Hoppo, Shinchiku Chō (modern-day Beipu, Hsinchu County), attacked Japanese officials and their families. In retaliation, Japanese military and police killed more than 100 Hakka people. The local uprising was the first of its kind in Taiwan under Japanese rule, and led to others over the following years.

== Background ==
Following the signing of the Treaty of Shimonoseki in 1895 between the Empire of Japan and Qing Empire of China, Taiwan was ceded to Japan in perpetuity, along with the Penghu Islands. The Japanese rule saw Taiwan take large strides towards modernization, as they oversaw improvements to the island's infrastructure, economy, and health and education systems. Despite this, much of the population still suffered hardships, and there were regular partisan disturbances against Japanese installations. These guerrilla raids often resulted in Japanese reprisals which tended to be more brutal than the initial attack, such as the 1896 ‘Yun-lin massacre', which resulted in 6,000 Taiwanese deaths. Although the situation improved under Goto Shinpei, these disturbances still continued under Sakuma Samata, who succeeded Goto in 1905.

As part of the push for modernisation under Japanese rule, Beipu prospered due to its nearby coal mines. The town of Beipu was predominantly made up of members of the Hakka subgroup of Han Chinese, while people of the Saisiyat indigenous ethnic group also lived in the area. As Taiwanese aborigines, rather than Han Chinese, these groups were viewed as barbarians and were particularly likely to face oppression from Japanese rule, especially under Sakuma Samata's term as governor-general.

== Incident ==
In response to what was perceived as Japanese oppression, Tsai Ching-lin (蔡清琳) organised a group of insurgents in November 1907. The group, consisting mainly of Hakka with the support of the local Saisiyat aboriginal tribes, seized a collection of weapons in Beipu Township on 14 November. The following day, the insurgents killed 57 Japanese officers and their family members. As retribution, Japanese authorities killed more than 100 Hakka over the following days, the majority of whom were young males from Neitaping (內大坪), a small village in the area.

== Significance ==
The Beipu Incident was the first incident of its kind against the Japanese rule in Taiwan. Although other disturbances had occurred since the takeover in 1895, this was the first of a series of local uprisings which flared up quickly, and marked a new phase in armed Taiwanese resistance. Following Beipu, other similar uprisings such as the Tapani incident in 1915 and the Wushe Incident in 1930 occurred, the latter of which ultimately led to a change in approach to Japanese dealings with the aboriginal tribes of Taiwan.

== See also ==
- Taiwanese resistance to Japanese colonialism
