= Yunlin massacre =

1896 massacre in Yunlin

The Yunlin massacre (Chinese: 雲林大屠殺) was a massacre in Yunlin County, Taiwan in 1896, during the Japanese rule over Taiwan. There are various views and estimates on the number of victims, ranging from 6,000 or 10,000 to 30,000.

== Background ==
In 1894, the First Sino-Japanese War erupted, and it concluded the following year with the defeat of the Qing dynasty by the Empire of Japan. In 1895, the war officially ended with the signing of the Treaty of Shimonoseki, which ceded both Taiwan and the Penghu islands to the Japanese. In 1895, Japanese forces advanced into Taiwan, and armed anti-Japanese resistance activities surged across Taiwan.

== Massacre ==
In 1896, the Office of the Governor-General of Taiwan announced the transition from military to civilian rule effective April 1. To suppress anti-Japanese activities, led by figures like Ko Tie (柯鐵), Japanese forces occupied Douliu District. On April 12, Major Shimada launched a punitive expedition against Jian Yi in Henglu Village, Yunlin. Jian Yi escaped, prompting Shimada to “withdraw his troops, assemble in the northern open field, and execute the prisoners.” This enraged the anti-Japanese forces in Tiegushan: taking Lugu, Nantou as their base, they led over 600 men in an ambush of the Japanese troops.

On June 13, a Japanese-owned shop was looted; Yunlin Subprefectural Chief Matsumura Yujin, along with the Military Police Captain and Garrison Captain, launched a pursuit. They learned the resistance forces had gathered at Dapingding. On June 14, Lieutenant Nakamura Michiaki of the Yunlin Garrison led over 20 troops to do reconnaissance on Dapingding. Imamura Heizo, citing insufficient manpower and unfamiliarity with the terrain, warned that “regret would follow,” but Nakamura disregarded the advice and advanced. They fell into an ambush by militia forces, suffering heavy casualties; over half were killed, and the wounded Nakamura Michiaki committed suicide. The following day, Japanese forces retaliated by burning homes and deliberately killing civilians.

In June, the Japanese 2nd Brigade attacked Yunlin with the Taichung 1st Regiment. Matsumura Yūjin claimed, "there are no good people under Yunlin's jurisdiction". Beginning June 17, Japanese forces from Taichung, Chiayi, and Changhua were assembled in Douliu. Local guide Wu Ming led them toward Dapingding, however, upon entering Xiaopingding, the Japanese encountered an ambush. Lieutenant Nakamura Masana was captured alive and executed by slow slicing. An urgent telegram was sent by Japanese forces to the Governor-General's Office requesting reinforcements. Morale among the militia soared. Ko Tie and his followers elected Kán Gī (簡義), a former Black Flag Army member, as their leader and declared 1896 the "First Year of Heaven's Mandate" (天運元年).

From June 20 to 23, massive Japanese forces were assembled. Villages were branded as "bandit dens" and burned to the ground; a total of 4,925 civilian homes were set ablaze, drawing international media condemnation of the Japanese government. Japan's own post-event statistics reported 56 villages destroyed and 4,925 civilian homes burned. Reprisal massacres occurred everywhere, including the slaughter of women and children. Douliu District and Shiguixi Village suffered the most severe devastation. When Kodama Squadron, which had attacked Tien-kuo Mountain, withdrew from Lin-chi-pu (present-day Zhushang Township, Nantou County) back to Yunlin, they set fires along the way. The villages of Jiou-k'ung-lin, Shih-liu-pan, and Hai-feng-lun were completely burned down, and innocent civilians were killed without cause.

== Impact ==
In the wake of the massacre, the Japanese government took advantage of local administrative reforms to abolish the name Yunlin, replacing it with Douliu as the official designation for the region.

During this massacre, Japan further leveraged the Qing dynasty's legacy baojia system, maintaining this structure to compel Taiwanese residents to monitor one another. This practice compensated for inadequate police oversight and enabled more effective control over Taiwan.

== See also ==
- Beipu uprising
