= Mona Rudao =

Seedeq chief from Taiwan (1880–1930)

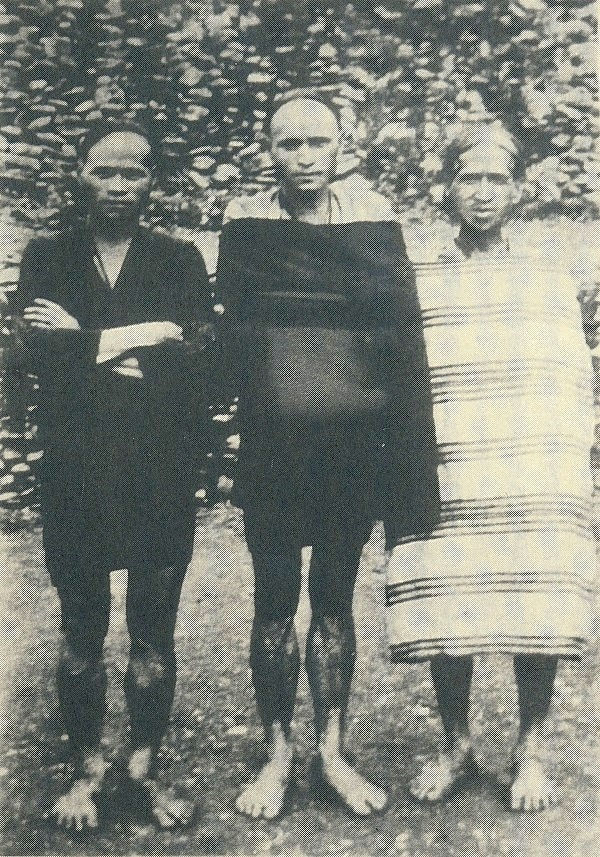
- Mona Rudao (centre) and other Seediq tribal leaders
- Born: 21 May 1880; Formosa
- Died: 28 November 1930 (aged 50); Taichū Prefecture, Japanese Taiwan
- Occupation: Chief of Mahebo
- Children: 3
- Parent: Rudao Luhe

Mona Rudao, sometimes Mouna Rudao or Mona Ludaw (1880–1930; Chinese: 莫那·魯道), was the son of a chief of the Seediq tribe of Taiwanese aborigines. In 1911, he made a visit to Japan. He succeeded his father as a chief of the village of Mahebo (Chinese: 馬赫坡社, in present-day Ren'ai, Nantou) and became one of the most influential chiefs of the area of Wushe. Mona Rudao was from the Tgdaya group of the Seediq.

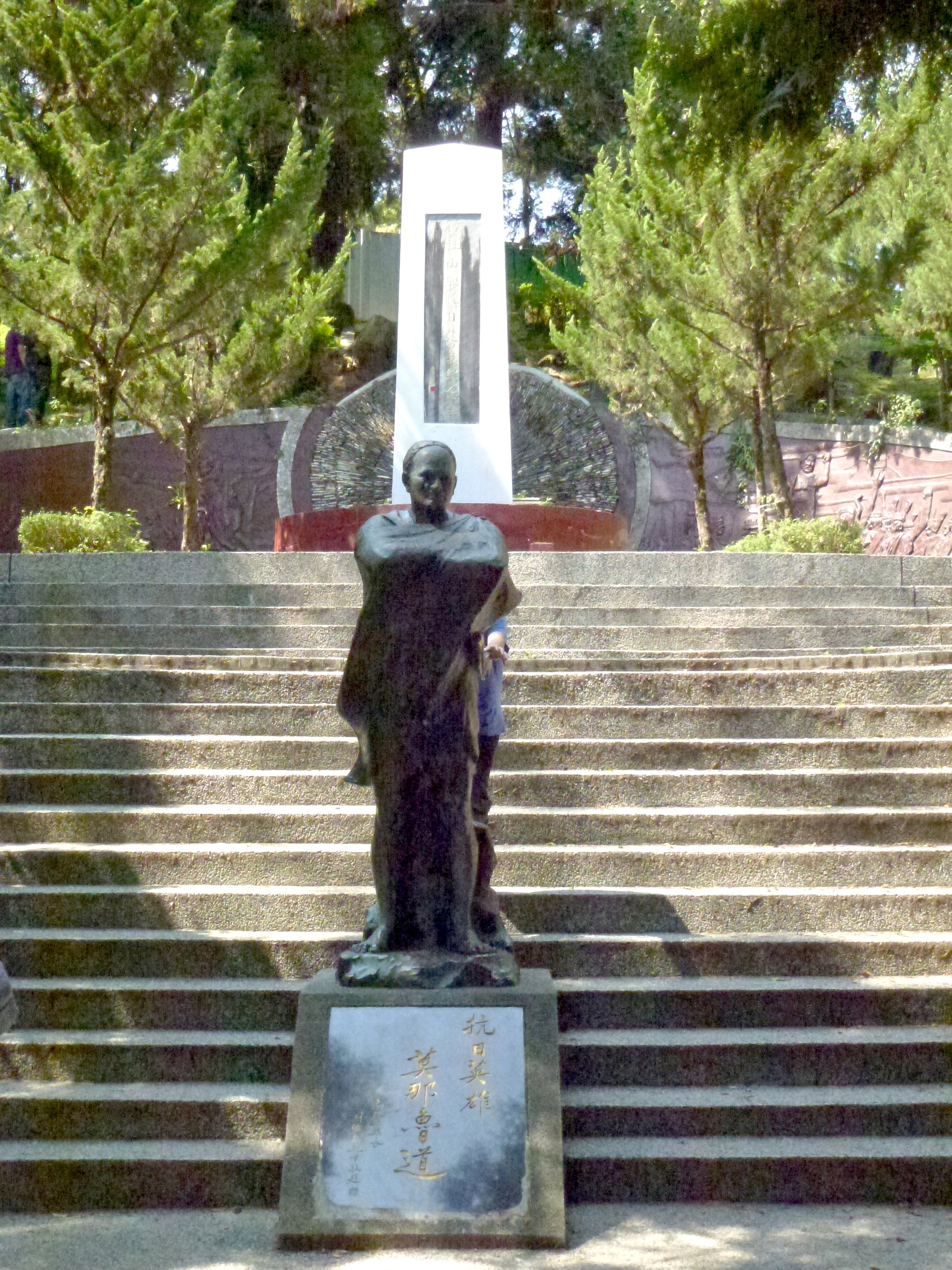
A statue of Mona at the Wushe Incident Memorial Park

He became famous for orchestrating the Musha incident in what is now Nantou County in 1930 against the Japanese authorities. He ended up committing suicide by shooting himself with a pistol during the revolt to prevent the Japanese from capturing him alive. His remains were found in a forest in 1933, and were taken to the Department of Archaeology of the Taihoku Imperial University (now called National Taiwan University) where they were exhibited as a warning to future rebels. The bones were "identified" by his daughter and not positively confirmed by DNA. After the arrival of the Kuomintang the bones were placed in a warehouse until 1974 when they were reburied near the Kawanakajima (Japanese: 川中島; modern-day Alan-Gluban (Chinese: 清流部落)) tribe at the Wushe Incident Memorial Park. The Taiwanese viewed him as a hero for carrying out a revolt and he is now one of the figures on New Taiwan Dollar coins.

In 2005 the Kuomintang displayed a massive photo of Mona Rudao at its headquarters in honor of the 60th anniversary of Taiwan Retrocession Day.

Mona Rudao has been part of Taiwanese popular culture, appearing in books and manga. His character took the part of protagonist in the 2003 TV Drama Dana Sakura (風中緋櫻) and the 2011 Taiwanese film Warriors of the Rainbow: Seediq Bale.

Mona Rudao's daughter Mahung Mona became known as the "woman who washed her face with tears" because all members of her immediate family—including her parents, siblings, uncle Tado Mona, first husband Sapu Pawan, and their children—died as a result of the Wushe incident.

== See also ==
- Musha Incident
- Warriors of the Rainbow: Seediq Bale
