= Chuping Archaeological Site =

Archaeological site in Ren'ai, Nantou County, Taiwan

- 曲冰考古遺址 (Chinese)
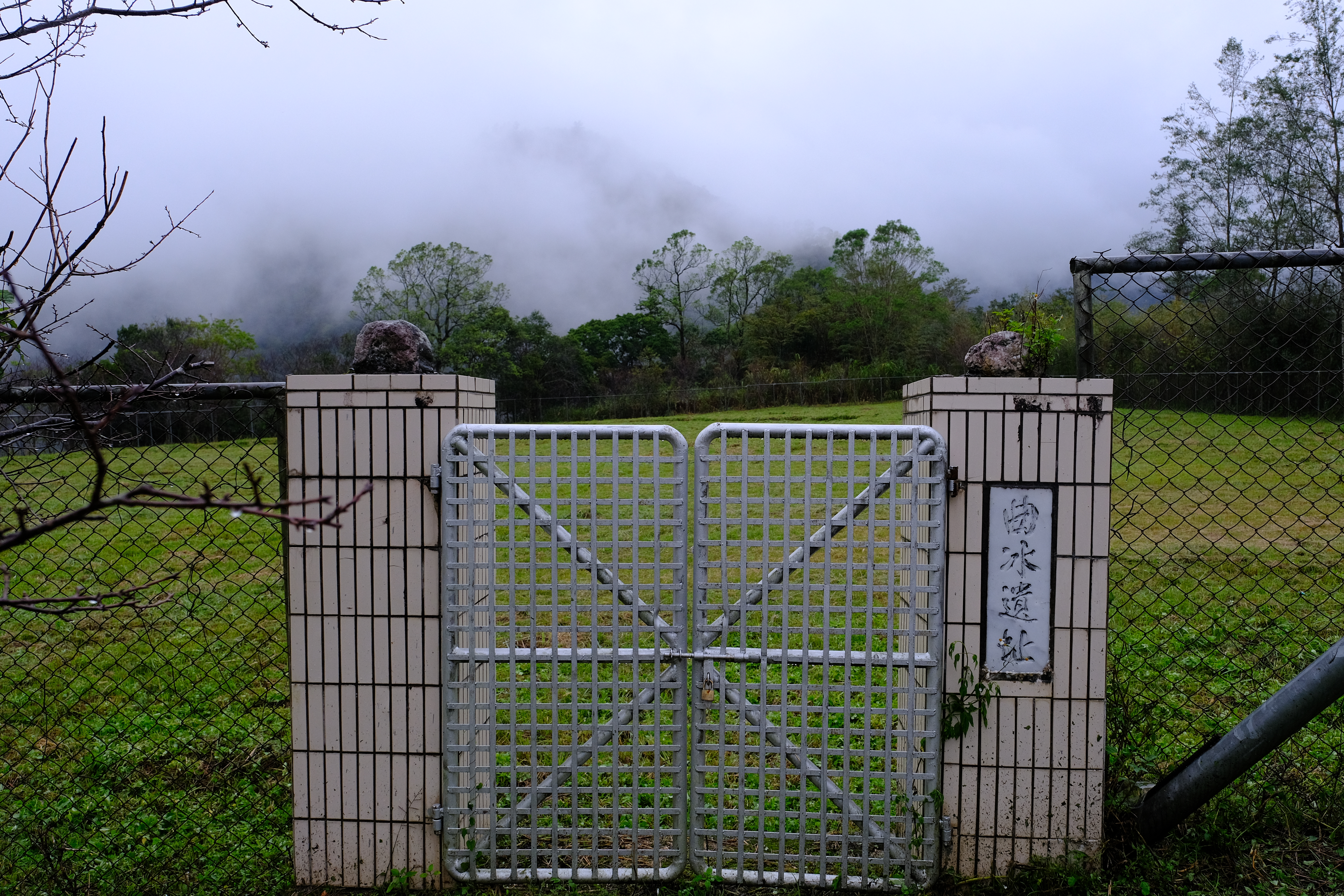

- Location within Nantou County
- 23°57′19.3″N 121°04′49.4″E
- Type: archaeological site
- Location: Ren'ai, Nantou County, Taiwan

Site notes
- Elevation: 750 m (2,460 ft)
- Excavation dates: 1981-1987
- Discovered: 1980

The Chuping Archaeological Site (traditional Chinese: 曲冰考古遺址; simplified Chinese: 曲冰考古遗址; pinyin: Qūbīng Kǎogǔ Yízhǐ) is an archaeological site in Ren'ai Township, Nantou County, Taiwan. It houses relics of the first prehistoric mountain settlements in Taiwan.

== Modern history ==
The site was discovered in 1980 in the upper area of Zhuoshui River valley. Three excavations were performed there between 1981 and 1987. The site was later covered again as a protective measure, with the intention of eventually transforming it into an educational exhibit. On 14 May 2019, the Ministry of Culture declared the site as Taiwan's 10th national archaeological site.

== Geology ==
The site is located at an altitude of 750 metres (2,460 ft).

== See also ==
- Prehistory of Taiwan
