= Huisun Forest Recreation Area =

Forest in Ren'ai, Nantou County, Taiwan

Huisun Forest Recreation Area Chinese: 惠蓀林場
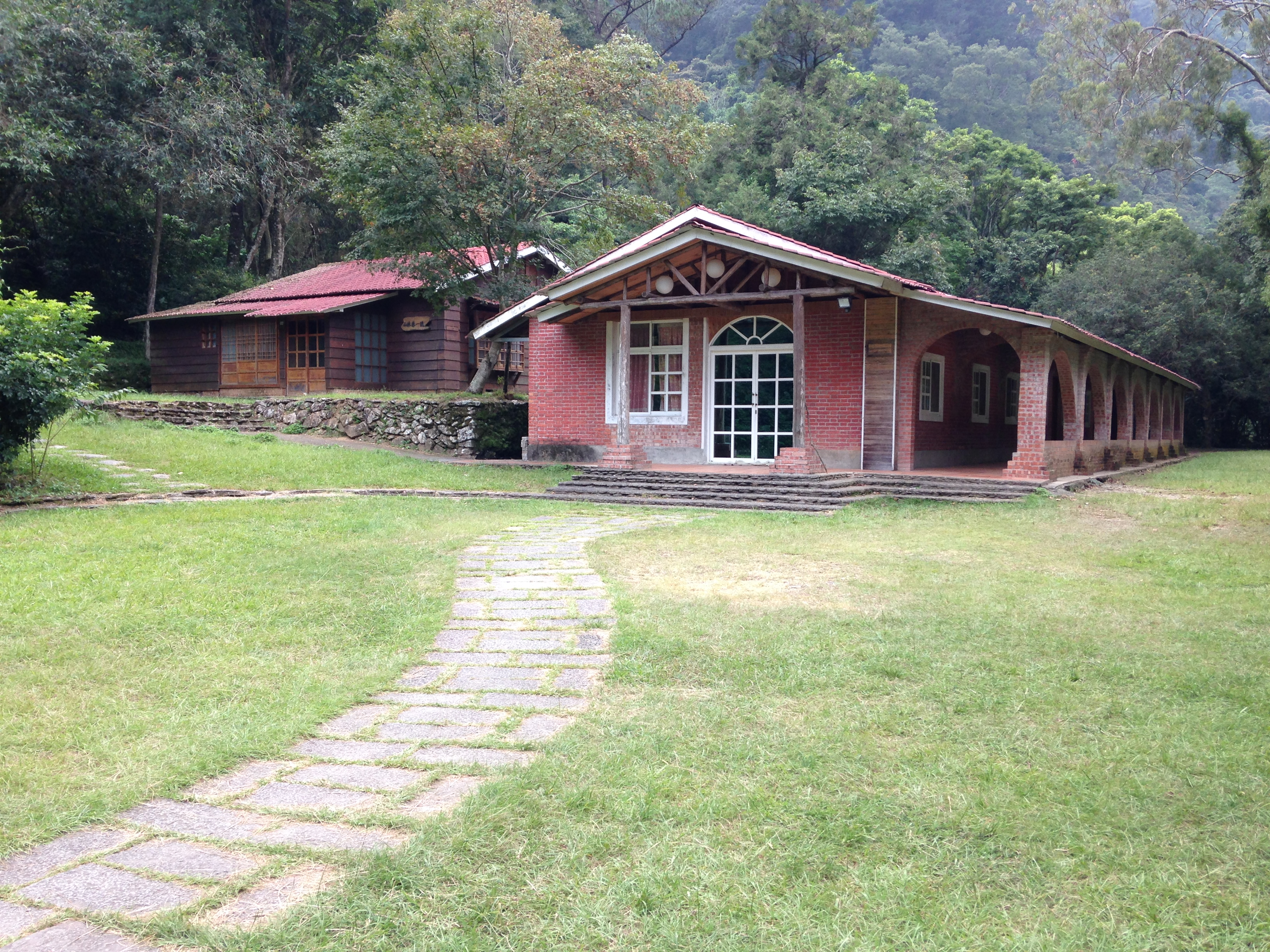

- Location within Nantou County
- Interactive map of Huisun Forest Recreation Area

Geography
- Location: Ren'ai, Nantou County, Taiwan
- Coordinates: 24°4′21.8″N 121°1′15.3″E
- Elevation: 450–2,419 m (1,476–7,936 ft)
- Area: 74.77 km^{2} (28.87 sq mi)

Administration
- Established: 1916
- Authority: National Chung Hsing University

The Huisun Forest Recreation Area (traditional Chinese: 惠蓀林場; simplified Chinese: 惠荪林场; pinyin: Huìsūn Línchǎng) is a forest in Ren'ai Township, Nantou County, Taiwan. The forest is managed by the Department of Agriculture of National Chung Hsing University (NCHU).

== Name ==
The name Huisun was taken from the late president of NCHU, Tang Hui-sun, who died when exploring the forest.

== History ==
The forest was established in 1916. After the handover of Taiwan from Japan to the Republic of China, the forest was managed by the Taiwan Provincial College of Agriculture and named Nenggao Forest. In 1963, the forest was renamed to Huisun Forest.

== Geology ==
The forest covers an area of 74.77 km^{2} and located at an altitude of 450–2,419 meters above sea level. It consists of 500 meters deep canyons and waterfalls. It also features six hiking trails.

== Transportation ==
The forest is accessible by bus from Puli Township. Access by road is on Provincial Highway No. 21 at the 29km marker.

== See also ==
- Geography of Taiwan
