= Taiwanese resistance to Japanese colonialism =

Resistance to Japanese rule in Taiwan

The Taiwanese resistance to Japanese colonialism is a series of resistance movements that took place during the period of Japanese rule in Taiwan. Most of the violent conflicts took place between 1895 and 1915, the first 20 years of Japanese rule over Taiwan. which can be roughly divided into three stages: The first stage was the Yiwei War from May to October 1895 to defend the Republic of Formosa; the second stage was the anti-Japanese guerrilla war from immediately after the disestablishment of the Republic of Formosa to 1902, with armed revolts almost every year; the third stage was from the Beipu uprising in 1907 to the Tapani incident in 1915. Afterwards, the Han people's anti-Japanese movement turned into a nonviolent form to safeguard their own culture and political participation, while the indigenous people still had armed conflicts with the Government-General of Taiwan, the most notable of which was the Musha Incident.

== Background and causes ==
=== Mudan incident of 1871 ===
On November 6, 66 Ryūkyūan sailors wandered into the heart of Taiwan after their ship was destroyed in a typhoon, leaving them shipwrecked on the southeastern tip of Taiwan. On November 8, the 66 sailors arrived at the Mudan community and were ordered to stay there by the local Paiwan people. One day later, after expressing doubts, the 66 sailors attempted to escape. While 12 were taken into protective custody by Han Chinese officials, the remaining 54 were killed.

The survivors were lodged in the house of Yang Youwang, who allowed them to stay for 40 days. By giving clothing and food to the Paiwan people, he was able to placate them. Afterward, the Japanese sailors stayed at the Ryukyuan embassy in Fuzhou, Fujian for half a year, and subsequently returned home to Miyako.

In retaliation for Qing China's refusal to pay compensation on the grounds that the Taiwanese aboriginals were out of their jurisdiction, Japan sent the Taiwan Expedition of 1874. The first overseas deployment of the Imperial Japanese Army and Imperial Japanese Navy saw 3,600 soldiers win the Battle of Stone Gate on May 22. Thirty Taiwanese tribesmen were either killed or mortally wounded in the battle. Japanese casualties counted six killed and 30 wounded.

In November 1874, Japanese forces withdrew from Taiwan after the Qing government agreed to an indemnity of 500,000 taels of silver.

=== Japanese occupation of the Pescadores ===
The Pescadores Campaign of March 23–26, 1895 marked the last military operation of the First Sino-Japanese War. As the 1895 Treaty of Shimonoseki between Qing, China and Japan originally omitted Taiwan and the Pescadores Islands, Japan was able to mount a military operation against them without fear of damaging relations with China. By occupying the Pescadores, Japan aimed to prevent Chinese reinforcements from reaching Taiwan. On March 15, 1895, a Japanese force of 5,500 men set sail for the Pescadores and landed on Pa-chau Island on March 23.

Due in part to the demoralized defenses of the Chinese, roughly 5,000 men, Japanese forces managed to take the Pescadores in three days. While Japanese casualties were minimal, an outbreak of cholera killed 1,500 within days.

=== Treaty of Shimonoseki ===
The final version of the Treaty of Shimonoseki was signed at the Shunpanro hotel in Shimonoseki, Japan on April 17, 1895. The treaty ended the First Sino-Japanese War between Japan and the Qing Empire.

While Japan sought to have Taiwan ceded to them, as it would provide an excellent base for military expansion into South China and Southeast Asia, China recognized Taiwan's importance as a trading point to the West, and refused to include it in the treaty.

Japan called the cession of Taiwan a necessity, China argued that it had been a province of China since 1885 and had not been a battleground in the war. Chinese officials refused to cede it, and instead transferred the Penghu islands and the eastern portion of the bay of the Liaodong peninsula. China was unable to keep Taiwan and it was included in the treaty, ending 200 years of Qing dynasty rule.

The conditions Japan placed on China led to the Triple Intervention of France, Germany, and Russia just six days after the signing. With established ports and enclaves in China, the three countries demanded that Japan withdraw its claim on the Liaodong peninsula.

The inclusion of Taiwan in the final treaty led pro-Qing officials to declare the Republic of Formosa in 1895. It never gained international recognition.

The state flag of the Republic of Formosa

=== Republic of Formosa ===
After hearing of the cession of Taiwan to Japan, pro-Qing officials led by Qiu Fengjia declared the Republic of Formosa. Tang Jingsong, the Qing governor-general of Taiwan, became the republic's first president. Liu Yongfu, the retired Black Flag Army commander and national hero, became the Grand General of the Army.

Western powers were unable to recognize it due to its cession to Japan in the Treaty of Shimonoseki. Because Formosa intended to rely upon China for troops and defenses, it had to recognize China as sovereign, which alienated European powers. Meanwhile, China refused to acknowledge the republic to avoid offending Japan or sending Chinese troops to Formosa. Tang Jingsong was ordered to return to Peking.

Formosa existed for one week before Japan landed on its shores on May 29.

== Resistance to Japanese invasion ==
Japanese invasion of Taiwan (Formosa)
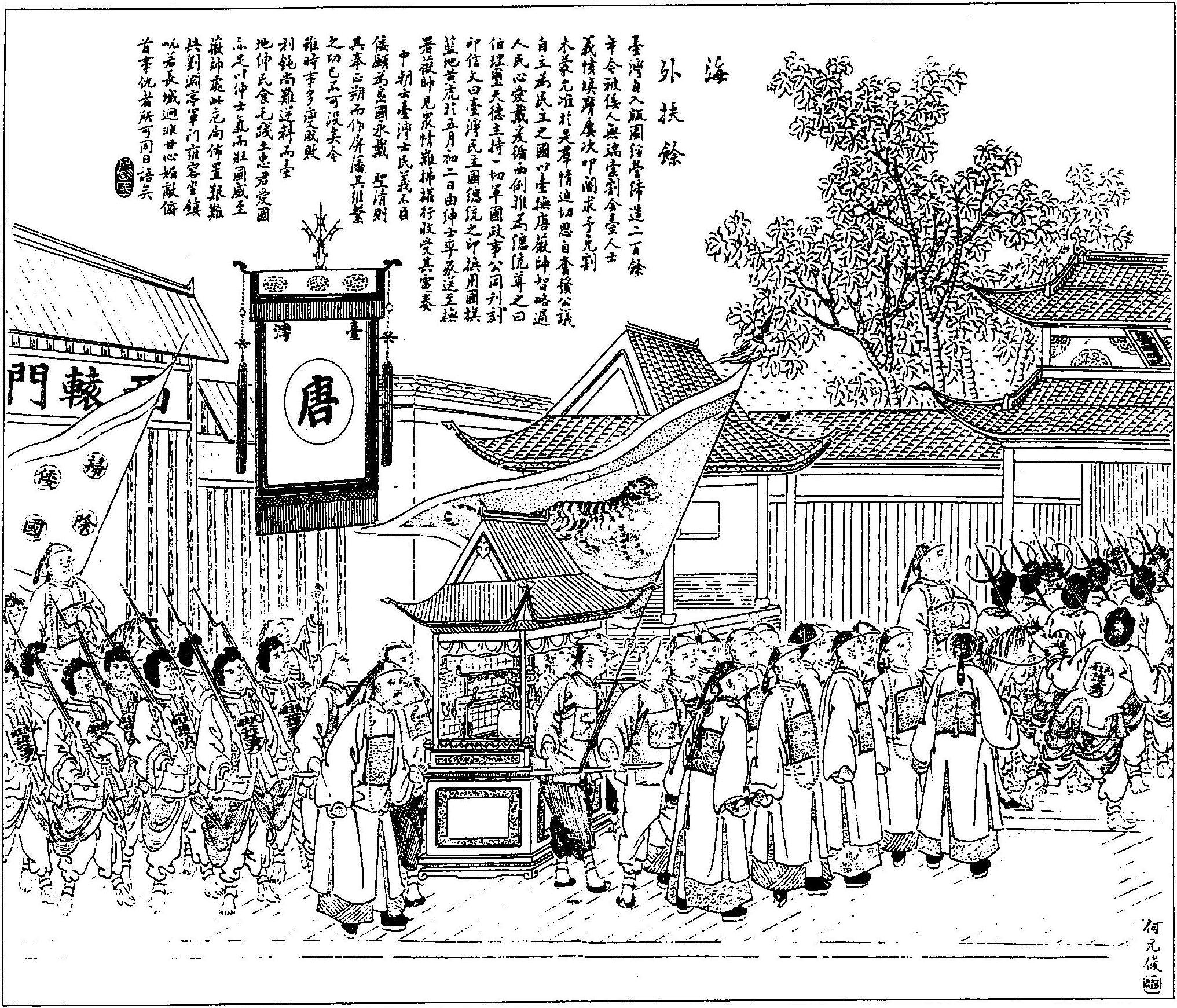
Date	May–October 1895
Location	Taiwan (Republic of Formosa)
Result	Japanese victory

Belligerents
Republic of Formosa	Empire of Japan

Casualties and losses
Killed: approx. 14,000 including civilian casualties	Killed: 164 Wounded: 515 Died from disease: 4,642

=== Political leaders ===
==== Tang Jingsong ====
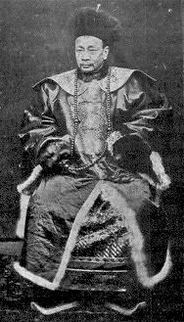
Tang Jingsong

Tang Jingsong (traditional Chinese: 唐景崧; simplified Chinese: 唐景嵩; pinyin: Táng Jǐngsōng) (1841–1903) was a Chinese statesman and general who convinced the Black Flag Army leader Liu Yongfu to serve China in Tonkin, and although he ultimately failed, he was also widely praised for his actions in the Siege of Tuyên Quang (November 1884–March 1885).

Tang Jingsong was the governor of Taiwan when it was ceded to Japan in 1895 with the Treaty of Shimonoseki. He became president of the Republic of Formosa on May 25, 1895, and stayed to resist the Japanese. On June 3, 1895, the Formosan forces were defeated at Keelung, but news of the defeat didn't reach Taipei until June 4. Tang Jingsong fled Taiwan on June 6.

==== Liu Yongfu ====
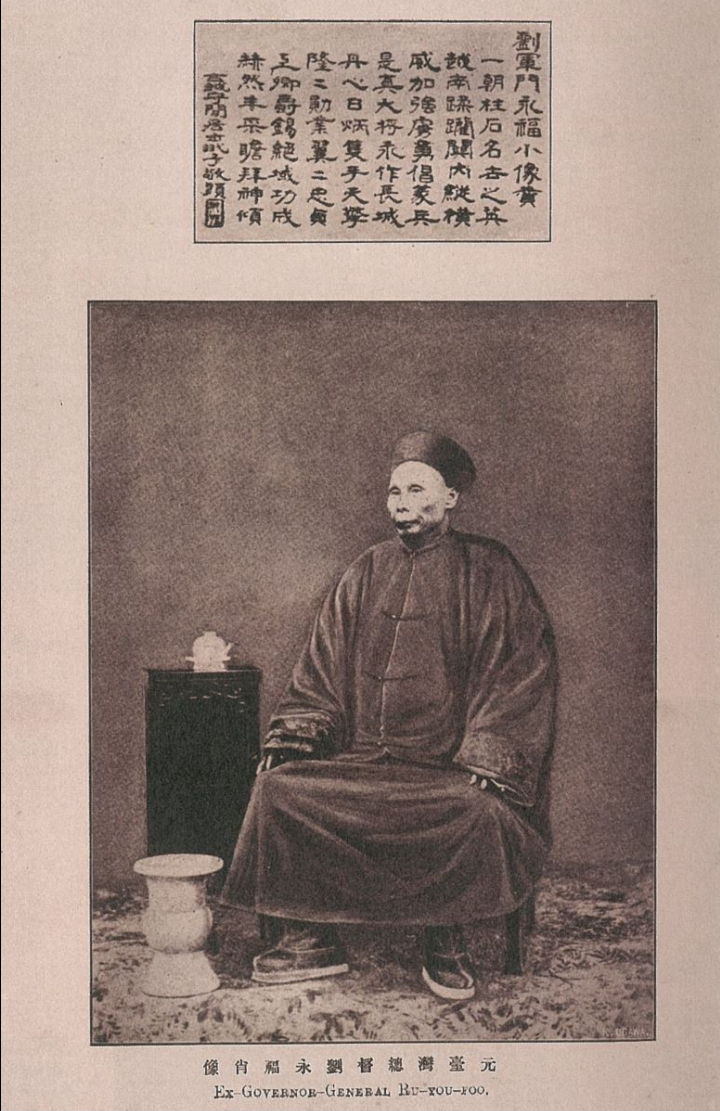
Liu Yongfu

Liu Yongfu (Chinese: 劉永福; pinyin: Liú Yǒngfú; Wade–Giles: Liu Yung-fu; Vietnamese: Lưu Vĩnh Phúc) (1837–1917) was a soldier of fortune and commander of the Black Flag Army. Convinced to join the fight by Tang Jingsong, he became a famous Chinese patriot in the fight against the French Empire in Tonkin.

He stayed in Taiwan with Tang Jingsong to fight the Japanese after the Treaty of Shimonoseki and was given command of resistance forces in the south as a general. When Tang Jingsong fled, Liu Yongfu became the second and final leader of the Republic of Formosa. When it became apparent that Taiwan was lost, he left Taiwan on 20 October 1895 aboard a British merchant ship, the SS Thales. However, the Yaeyama pursued it and caught up to the Thales in international waters near Amoy, but was unable to identify and capture the disguised Liu Yongfu. These actions spurred diplomatic protests from Britain, and the Japanese government issued an official apology. On October 21, Tainan surrendered to the Japanese.

=== Formosan forces ===
While Taiwan had no shortage of men in May 1895, Tang Jingsong exaggerated their numbers considerably to boost the morale of his soldiers. He sometimes claimed to have as many as 150,000 soldiers, including volunteers, but this number was scrutinized, and 75,000 was considered more accurate. The Formosan forces included Chinese soldiers from the Qing garrison, Hakka militia units, and local volunteers. Members of the Qing garrison made up the largest percentage of their forces at about 50,000 soldiers, with the Hakka militia, and volunteer units making up the other 25,000. Liu Yongfu commanded approximately 20,000 men in the south, Qiu Fengjia about 10,000 men, and a Chinese admiral named Yang commanded 30,000 men in the north.

=== Battles in Taipei ===
At about five in the morning on July 13, a grain transport fleet of 35 Japanese soldiers was attacked by the Taiwanese militia in Sa-kak-eng. After several hours of fierce fighting, the Japanese army was almost wiped out, and only four people escaped. This is known in history as the Battle of Long'enpu.

At about 7 a.m. on the same day, when Japanese Major led 894 soldiers along the Tudigongkeng Valley to support Toa-kho-ham, they were ambushed by another troop near Fenshuilun. After two days and nights of bloody fighting, four Japanese soldiers disguised themselves as beggars and escaped for help. On July 16, Japanese Major General Yamane Nobunari arrived with reinforcements to relieve the siege. In this battle, the Japanese army suffered hundreds of casualties, while the Taiwanese militia suffered only dozens of casualties. It is known in history as the Battle of Fenshuilun.

These two battles can be regarded as decisive battles that made the Japanese realize the Taiwanese people’s determination to resist the Japanese invasion.

=== Battle of Baguashan ===
The Battle of Baguashan is the largest battle ever fought on Taiwanese soil. The battle, fought on 27 August near Changhua in central Taiwan, was one of the few occasions on which the Formosans were able to deploy artillery against the Japanese.

The battle was an impressive Japanese victory, putting an end to organized resistance against the Japanese in central Taiwan, and ultimately paving the way for the final Japanese advance on Tainan, the last major Formosan stronghold.

=== Capitulation of Tainan ===
News that Liu Yongfu had fled reached Tainan on the morning of October 20. With both Tang Jingsong, and Liu Yongfu gone, Formosa was left with no real leadership. Many people fled to the port of Anping, away from the front lines. Chinese merchants and the European community were particularly concerned, fearing violence and plunder. Three Europeans from Maritime Customs at Anping, named Alliston, Burton, and McCallum, were able to convince nearly 10,000 soldiers gathered in Anping to surrent their weapons peacefully to the Japanese. Using one of the go-downs of Maritime Customs to house the surrendered weaponry, between 7,000 and 8,000 Chinese rifles were secured by nightfall.

Two English missionaries, James Fergusson and Thomas Barclay, agreed to go from Tainan to Lieutenant-General Nogi's headquarters in Ji-chang-hang with a letter from Chinese merchants explaining that the Chinese soldiers had laid down their weapons and would not fight back, and encouraging the Japanese forces to come maintain order. They were eventually successful in delivering the message. Nogi was wary but advanced on Tainan and entered the city the next morning.

=== Battle of Changhsing ===
On October 21, Tainan City surrendered, and the Taiwanese Hakka militia leader Chiu Feng-yang decided to retreat south to Hoe-sio Village (later called Changhsing Village), where he planned to launch a final resistance.

On December 25, the Japanese army marched south to fight against Chiu Feng-yang. The Japanese army used mountain guns to bombard the village and set fire to the houses. Eventually, the whole village was engulfed in flames, and the Hakka rebel army collapsed.

The battle officially ended all formal resistance to the Japanese invasion, but sporadic insurgency continued on for several more years, ending only when the Japanese governor-general adopted a more flexible policy towards the local population.

=== Casualties and losses ===
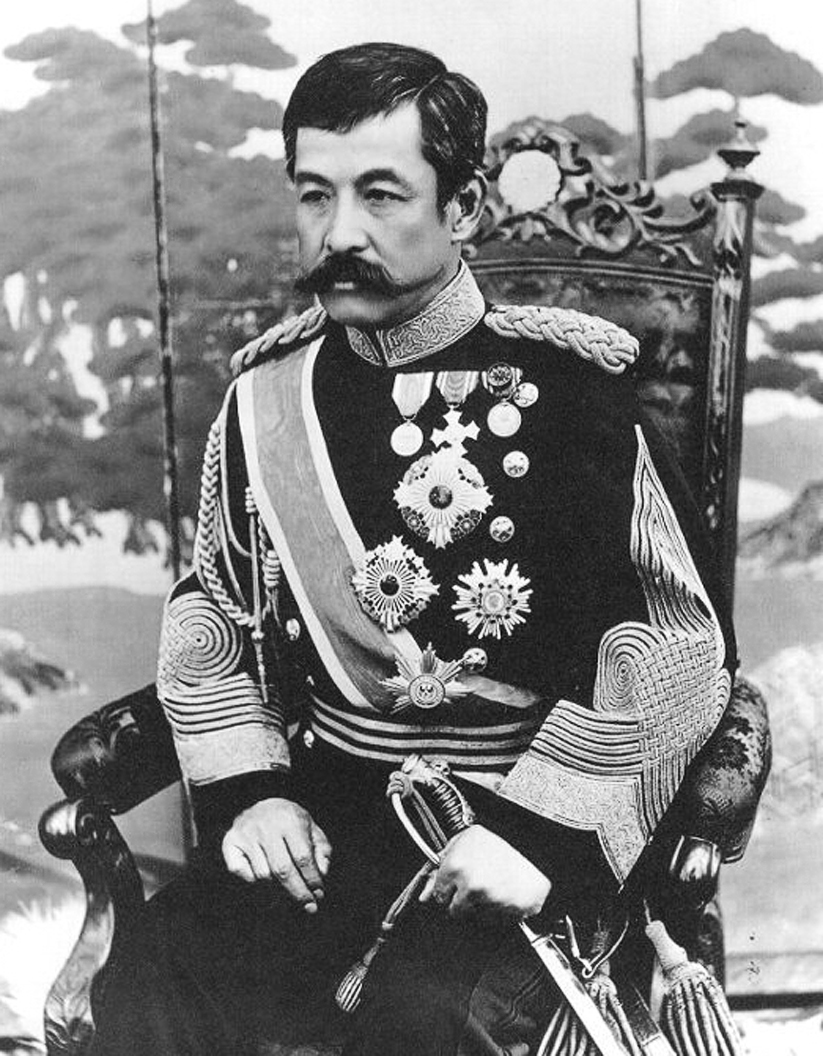
Prince Kitashirakawa Yoshihisa

Formosan and Chinese casualties were high but are difficult to estimate. The total number of Formosan and Chinese casualties was estimated at around 14,000.

Japanese casualties were lower. Japan had 515 wounded and 164 killed. Casualties from diseases like cholera and malaria were much higher. A cholera outbreak in the Pescadores Islands at the end of March 1895 killed more than 1,500 Japanese soldiers, and even more died of malaria in September 1895 in Changhua, not long after it was taken by the Japanese. According to Japanese numbers, 4,642 soldiers died in Taiwan and the Pescadores Islands of disease. By the end of the campaign, 21,748 Japanese soldiers had been evacuated back to Japan, while 5,246 soldiers were hospitalized in Taiwan.

Prince Kitashirakawa Yoshihisa fell ill with malaria on October 18 and died in Tainan on October 28, only seven days after the city surrendered to the Japanese. The prince's body was escorted back to Japan by the cruiser Yoshino. A rumor circulated in Taiwan that the prince died of a wound that he had received during the Battle of Baguashan.

== Resistance during Japanese rule ==
=== Armed uprisings ===
During the 50-year occupation, there were rebellions and guerrilla warfare that often led to battles and many deaths. From 1895 to 1902, fighting continued until the Japanese eventually gained control over most of the territory. This seven-year period of resistance ended when the Yunlin-based Tieguoshan force surrendered in May 1902. In the following years, only a few rebellions occurred. However, in October 1930, fighting between a Taiwanese aboriginal tribe and the Japanese killed over 130 Japanese. The Japanese crushed the rebellion, and over 600 Taiwanese died. This became known as the Musha Incident.

=== Nonviolent actions ===
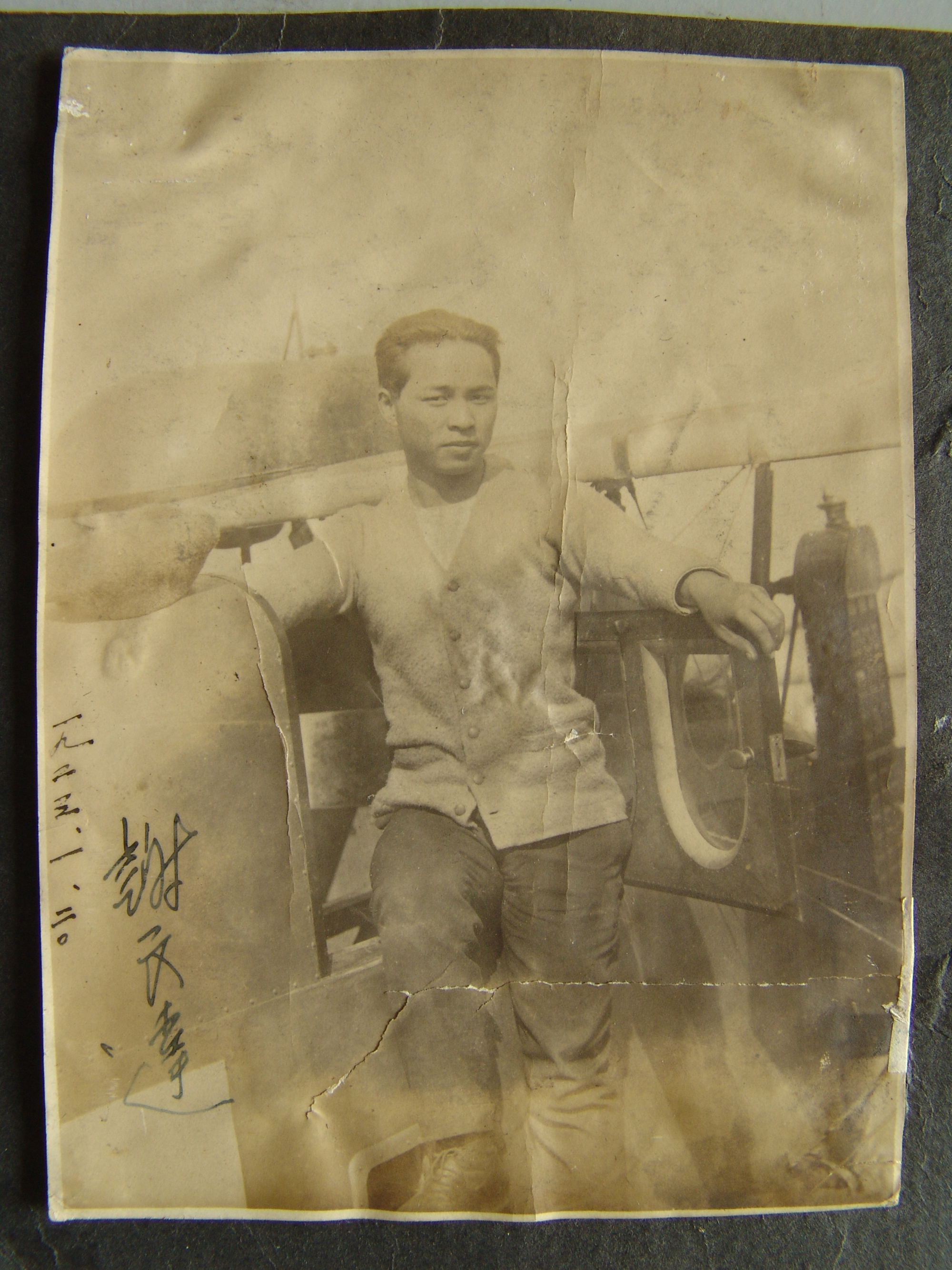
Hsieh Wen-ta

Several decades later, in 1915, several political groups emerged, including the Taiwan Cultural Association, Taiwanese People's Party, and Taiwanese Union of Local Autonomy. Their biggest concerns were the recognition of Taiwanese culture, freedom of speech, and a desire to establish a parliament. These petitions did not see widespread support, and no real progress was made at the time. Following Japan's withdrawal, these movements helped establish the political standard and general political opinions of current Taiwan.

From October 16 to 22, 1923, Hsieh Wen-ta (謝文達) flew over Tokyo and dropped thousands of fliers against Japanese rule in Taiwan. Among the messages were "Taiwanese have long been suffering under tyrannical rule" and "The totalitarianism of the colonial government is a disgrace to the constitutional country of Japan!" Hsieh was the first Taiwanese aviator to fly in 1921.

== See also ==
- Taiwan Revolutionary Alliance
