= Mount Shimen =

Mountain in Taiwan

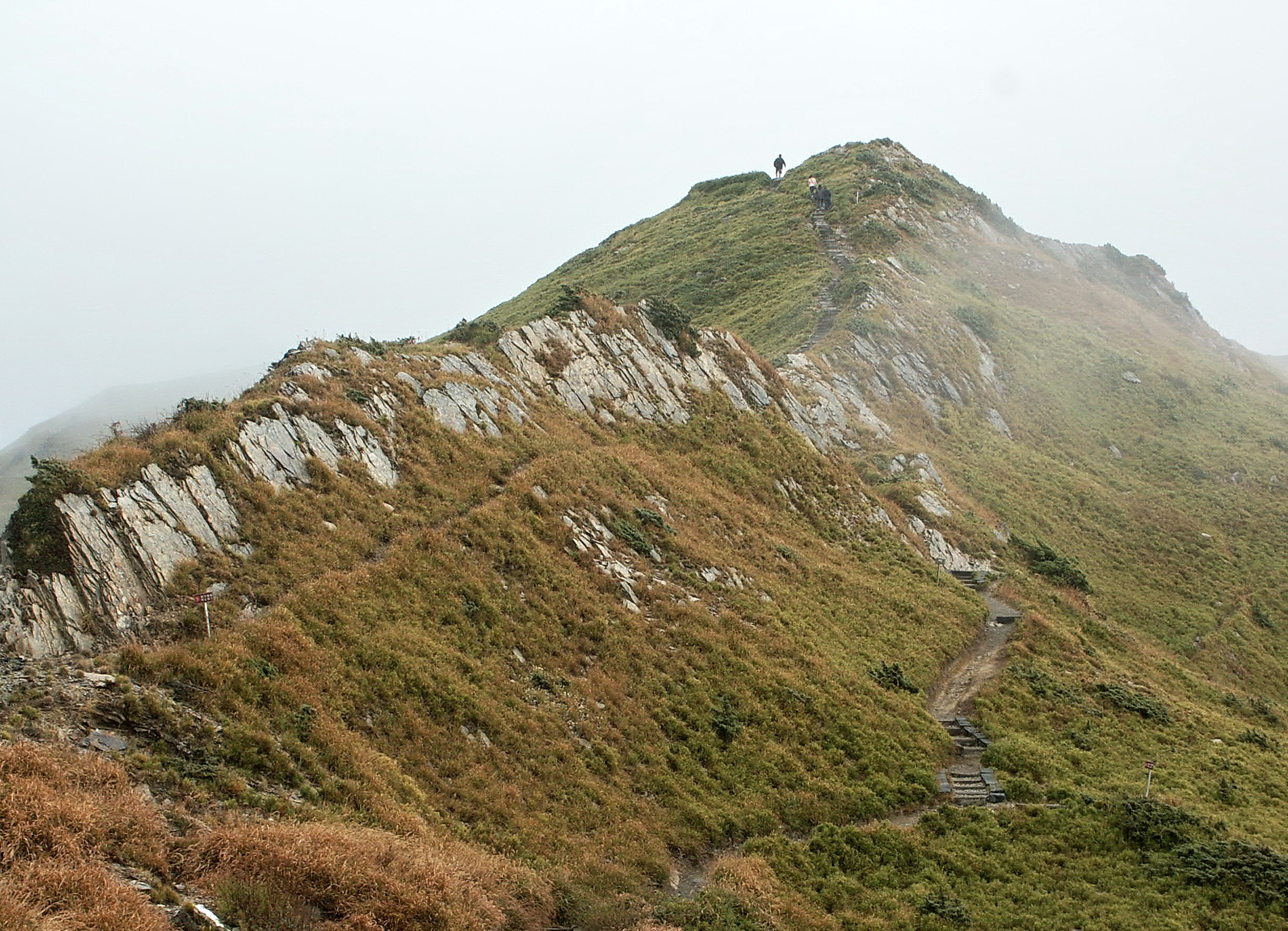

Highest point
- Elevation: 3,237 m (10,620 ft)
- Coordinates: 24°09′08.9″N 121°17′04.3″E

Naming
- Native name: 石門山 (Chinese)

Geography
- Location: Ren'ai, Nantou County and Xiulin, Hualien County of Taiwan
- Parent range: Central Mountain

The Mount Shimen (traditional Chinese: 石門山; simplified Chinese: 石门山; pinyin: Shímén Shān) is a mountain in Ren'ai Township, Nantou County and Xiulin Township, Hualien County of Taiwan.

== Geology ==
The peak of the mountain stands at an elevation of 3,237 meters above sea level.

== See also ==
- List of mountains in Taiwan
