= Seediq people =

Taiwanese indigenous people

Seediq
賽德克族 Seediq
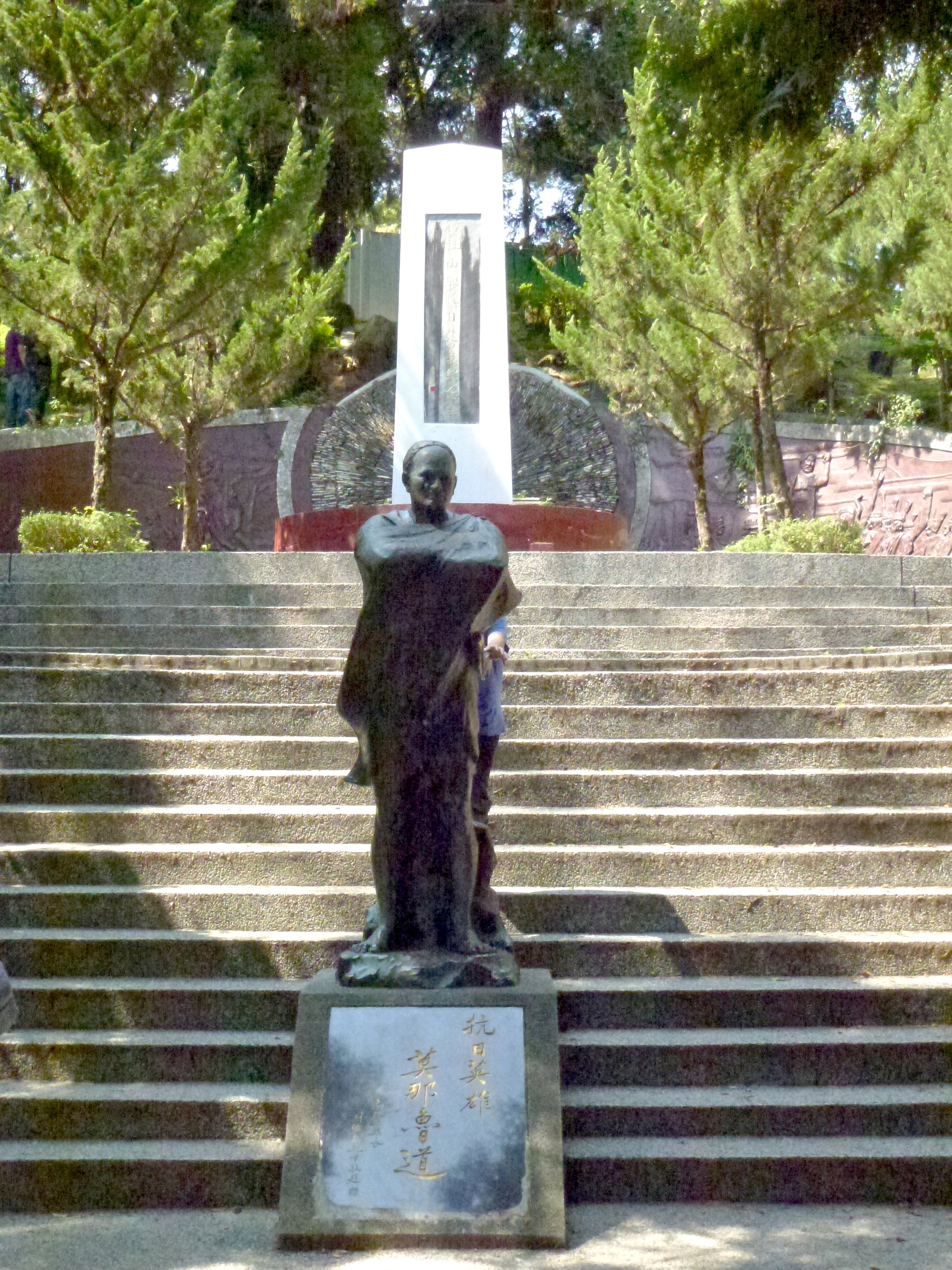
- A statue of Mona Rudao at the Wushe Incident Memorial Park

Total population
- 10,485 (April 2020)

Regions with significant populations
- Hualien and Nantou county (Taiwan)

Languages
- Seediq, Mandarin Chinese

Religion
- Animism, Christianity

Related ethnic groups
- Atayal, Taroko, Kavalan, Taiwanese indigenous peoples

The Seediq (sometimes Sediq, Seejiq, pronounced [seˈʔediq], [səˈdiq], or [səˈʔəɟiq]; Chinese: 賽德克族; pinyin: Sàidékèzú) are a Taiwanese Indigenous people who live primarily in Nantou County and Hualien County. Their language is also known as Seediq.

They were officially recognized as Taiwan's 14th Indigenous group on 23 April 2008. Previously, the Seediq, along with the closely related Taroko people, were classified as Atayal.

== Resistance to colonization ==
=== Wushe events ===
Starting from 1897, the Japanese began a road building program that brought them into the Indigenous people's territory. This was seen as invasive. Contacts and conflicts escalated and some Indigenous people were killed. In 1901, Indigenous people defeated 670 Japanese soldiers. As a result of this, in 1902, the Japanese isolated Wushe.

Between 1914 and 1917, Japanese forces carried out an aggressive 'pacification’ program, killing many resisting people. At this time, the leader of Mahebo, Mona Rudao, tried to resist rule by Japan, but he failed twice because his plans were divulged. At his third attempt, he organized seven out of twelve groups to fight against the Japanese forces.

=== Xincheng events ===
When Japanese soldiers raped Indigenous women, two leaders and 20 men killed 13 Japanese soldiers.

=== Renzhiguan events, 1902 ===
After taking over the plain, Japanese gained control of Wushe. Some of the Tgdaya people who resisted the Japanese were shot. Because of this, fighting broke out again, leading to the Wushe incident.

=== Zimeiyuan incident, 1903 ===
In 1903 the Japanese launched a punitive expedition to seek revenge for their earlier loss at Renzhiguan.

=== Truku War, 1914 ===
The Japanese wanted to subjugate the Truku group. After eight years of investigating the area, they invaded in 1914. Two thousand Indigenous people took part in resisting the invasion. The Japanese deployed 200 machine guns and 10,000 soldiers against the Indigenous people, but grievous wounds were inflicted upon the Japanese Governor-General Sakuma Samata during the war and caused his eventual death.

=== Wushe Incident, 1930 ===
The Musha Incident (Chinese and Japanese: 霧社事件; pinyin: Wùshè Shìjiàn; Wade–Giles: Wu⁴-she⁴ Shih⁴-chien⁴; Pe̍h-ōe-jī: Bū-siā Sū-kiāⁿ rōmaji: Musha Jiken), also known as the Wushe Rebellion and several other similar names, began in October 1930 and was the last major uprising against colonial Japanese forces in Japanese Taiwan. In response to long-term oppression by Japanese authorities, the Seediq Indigenous group in Musha (Wushe) attacked the village, killing over 130 Japanese. In response, the Japanese led a relentless counter-attack, killing over 600 Seediq in retaliation. The handling of the incident by the Japanese authorities was strongly criticised, leading to many changes in aboriginal policy.

== In popular culture ==
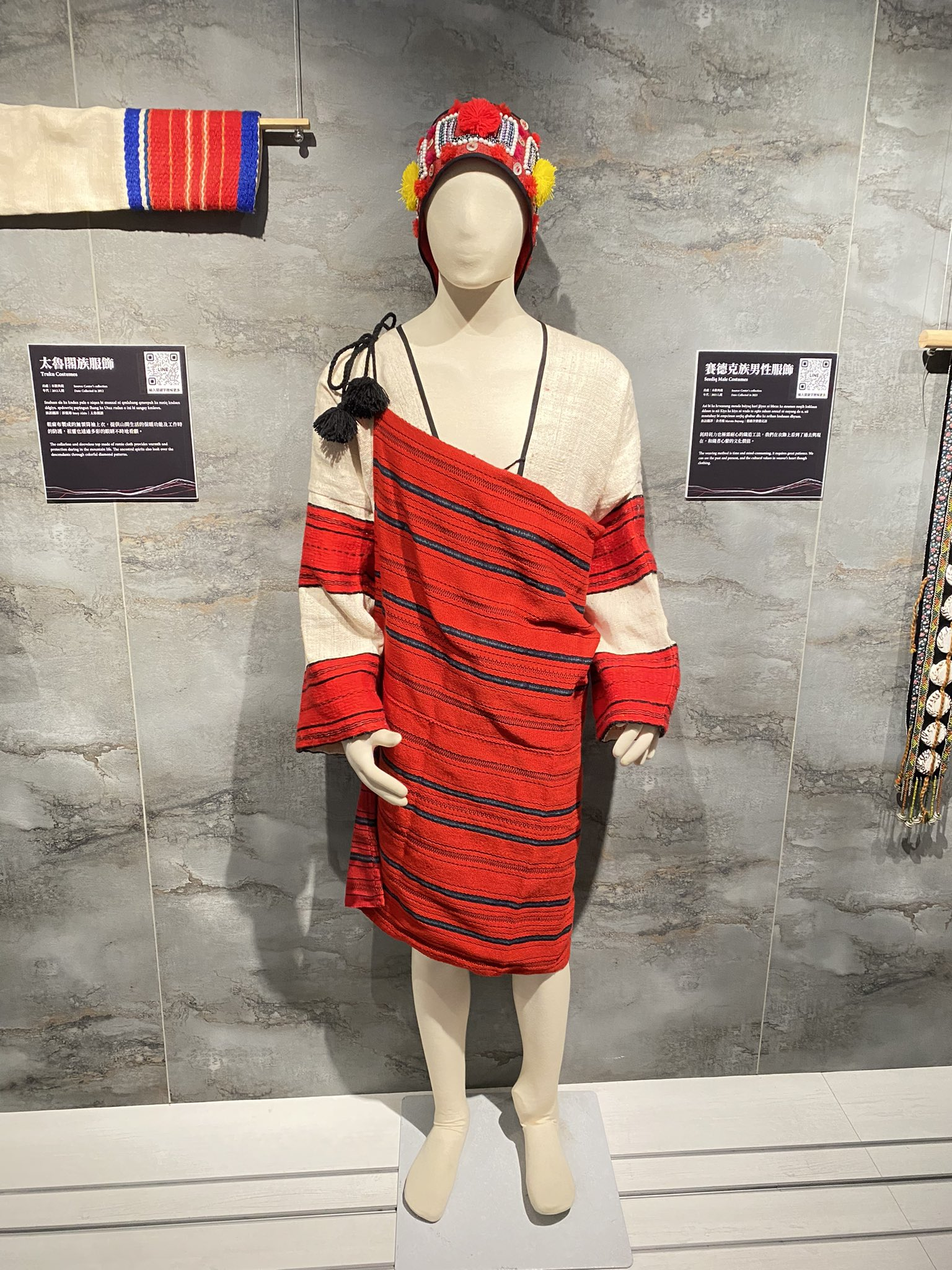
Seediq clothes

The Seediq people featured prominently in the 2011 Taiwanese historical drama film Seediq Bale which depicted the 1930 Wushe Incident along with the earlier Renzhiguan and Zimeiyuan incidents. The Wushe Incident was depicted three times in movies including in 1957 in the film 青山碧血 Qing Shan bi xue, It was also depicted in the 2003 TV Drama Dana Sakura.

The albums Seediq Bale (2007) and Takasago Army (2011) by Taiwanese extreme metal band Chthonic talk about the experiences of the Seediq people during the first half of the 20th century presented through fictionalized narratives.

== Notable people ==
- Iwan Nawi, Deputy Minister of Council of Indigenous Peoples
- Mona Rudao, A major figure during the Wushe Incident and a national hero of Taiwan.
- Walis Perin, Politician, Roman Catholic priest and Minister of the Council of Indigenous Peoples from 2005 to 2007.
- Umin Boya, Taiwanese writer, director, actor
- Feng-Ying Chang, weaver

== See also ==
- Demographics of Taiwan
- Taiwanese Indigenous peoples
