= Musha Incident =

1930 uprising in Japanese Taiwan

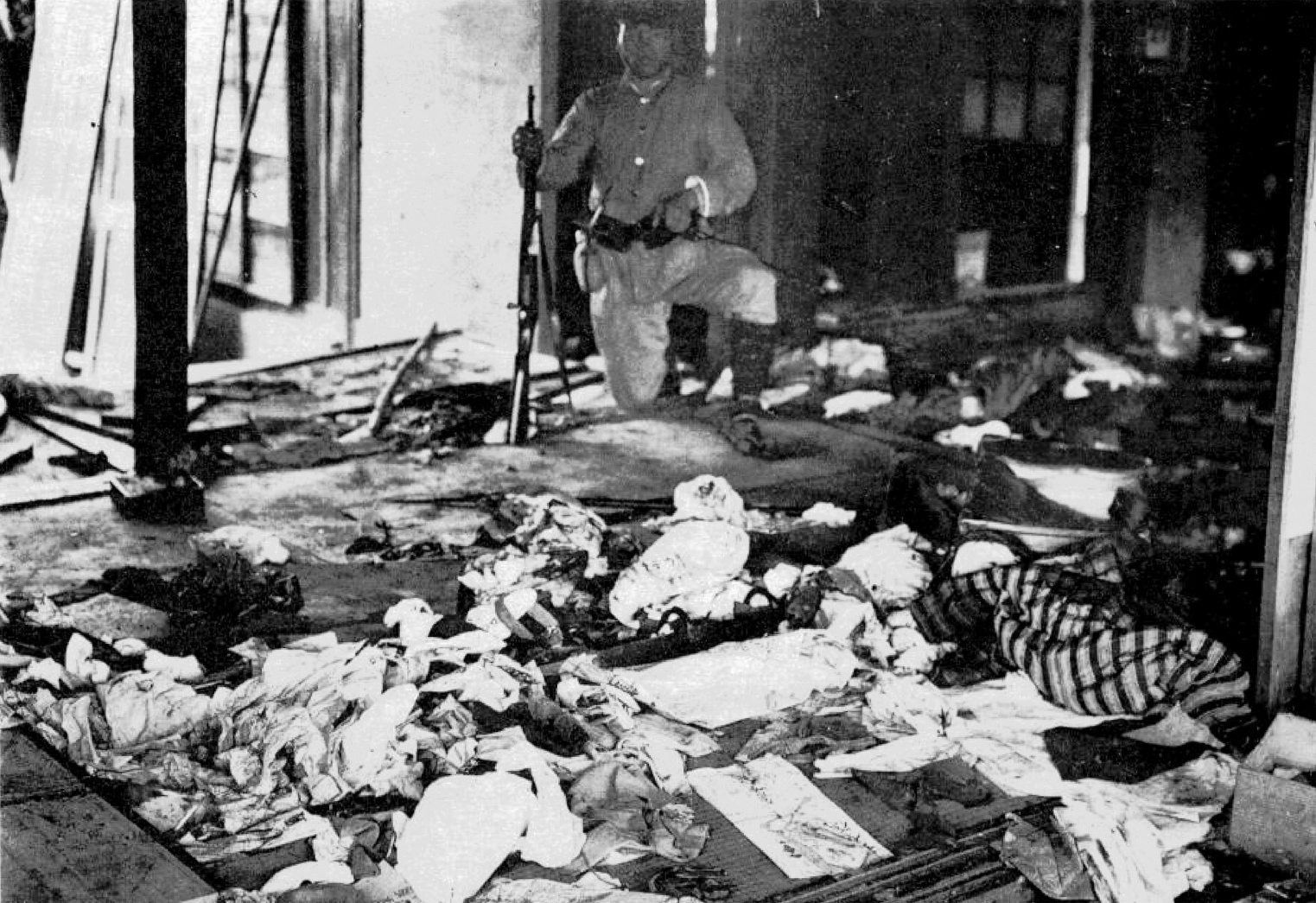
- A photo taken by the Japanese authorities in the aftermath of the Incident
Date	27 October – December 1930
Location	Musha, Nōkō District, Taichū Prefecture, Japanese Taiwan (modern-day Ren'ai Township, Nantou County, Taiwan)
Result	Japanese victory

Belligerents
Tkdaya	Empire of Japan; Toda; Truku (Taroko)

Commanders and leaders
Mona Rudao	(Empire of Japan) Ishizuka Eizō

Strength
~1,200	~2,000

Casualties and losses
644 killed	27 October: ~134 killed; 215 wounded; Military casualties unknown

The Musha Incident (Chinese and Japanese: 霧社事件; pinyin: Wùshè Shìjiàn; Wade–Giles: Wu^{4}-she^{4} Shih^{4}-chien^{4}; rōmaji: Musha Jiken; Pe̍h-ōe-jī: Bū-siā Sū-kiāⁿ), also known as the Wushe Rebellion and several other similar names, began in October 1930 and was the last major uprising against colonial Japanese forces in Japanese Taiwan. In response to long-term oppression by Japanese authorities, the Seediq indigenous group in the settlement of Musha (Wushe) attacked a school, killing 134 Japanese and two Han Taiwanese children. In response, the Japanese led a counter-attack, killing 354 Seediq in retaliation. The handling of the incident by the Japanese authorities was strongly criticised, leading to many changes in Aboriginal policy.

== Background ==
Previous armed resistance to Japanese imperial authority had been dealt with harshly, as demonstrated by responses to previous uprisings, such as the Tapani Incident, which resulted in a cycle of rebel attacks and harsh Japanese retaliation. However, by the 1930s, armed resistance had largely been replaced by organised political and social movements among the younger Taiwanese generation. Direct police involvement in local administration had been relaxed, many harsh punishments were abolished, and some elements of self-government, albeit of questionable effectiveness, had been introduced to colonial Taiwan.

However, a different approach was used in order to control Taiwan's indigenous peoples. The indigenous peoples of Formosa Island were still designated as seiban (生蕃; "raw barbarians" or "wild tribespeople"), and treated as inferiors, rather than as equal subjects. Tribes were "tamed" through "assimilation", the process of disarming traditional hunting tribes and forcing them to relocate to the plains and lead an agrarian existence. Further resistance was then dealt with by military campaigns, isolation and containment. In order to access natural resources in mountainous and forested indigenous-controlled areas, Governor-General Sakuma Samata adopted a more aggressive terrain policy known as the Five years plan to governing aborigines, attempting to pacify or eradicate aboriginal groups in areas scheduled for logging within five years' time; by 1915, this policy had been largely successful, although resistance still existed in the more remote areas.

=== Proximal causes ===
The Seediq people in the vicinity of Musha village had been considered by the Japanese authorities to be one of the most successful examples of this "taming" approach, with Chief Mona Rudao being one of 43 indigenous leaders selected for a tour of Japan a few years earlier. However, resentment still lingered, due largely to police misconduct, the ongoing practice of forced labor, and the lack of respect for Indigenous beliefs and customs.

In the days immediately prior to the incident, Chief Mona Rudao held a traditional wedding banquet for his son, Daho Mona, during which animals were slaughtered and wine was prepared and drunk. A Japanese police officer named Katsuhiko Yoshimura was on patrol in the area, and was offered a cup of wine by Daho Mona as a symbolic gesture. The officer refused, saying that Daho Mona's hands were soiled with blood from the slaughtered animals. Daho Mona attempted to take hold of the officer, insisting he participate, and the officer struck him with his stick. Fighting ensued, and the officer was injured. Mona Rudao attempted to apologize by presenting a flagon of wine at the officer's house, but was turned away. The simmering resentment among the Seediq in Musha was finally pushed to the limit.

== Incident ==
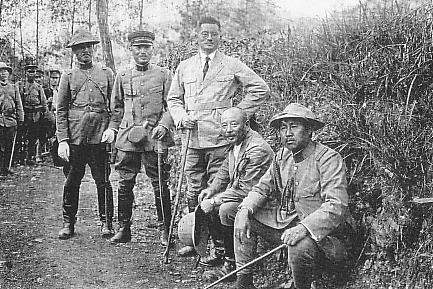
Commander and staff of the Musha Punitive force

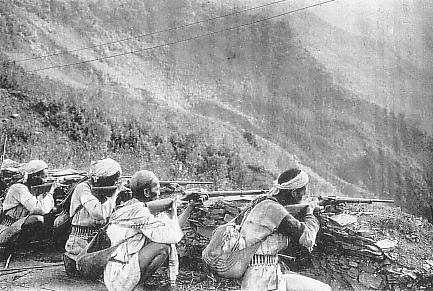
Mikata-Ban, a force of pro-Japanese aborigines

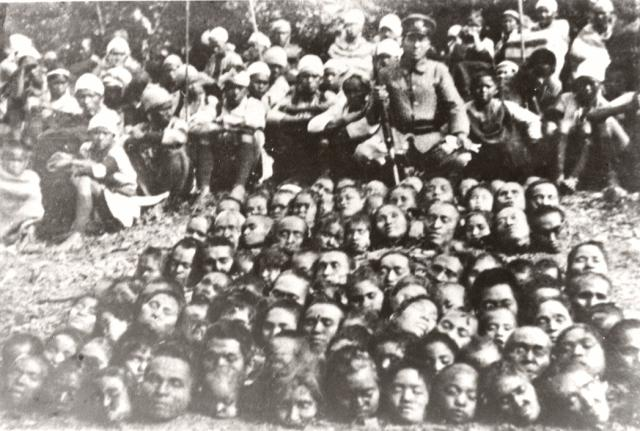
Beheaded Seediq at Second Musha Incident

On 27 October 1930, hundreds of Japanese converged on Musha for an athletics meet at the elementary school. Shortly before dawn, Mona Rudao led over 300 Seediq warriors in a raid of strategic police sub-stations to capture weapons and ammunition. They then moved on to the elementary school, concentrating their attack on the Japanese in attendance. Other tribes raided thirteen police stations, post offices, Japanese dormitories and shops in Musha, killing any Japanese they encountered. Meanwhile, they disconnected telegraph lines and roads in Musha in an attempt to cut off external communications.

A total of 134 Japanese, including women and children, were killed in the attack. Two Han Taiwanese dressed in Japanese clothing were also mistakenly killed, one of whom was a girl wearing a Japanese kimono. Most of the victims were beheaded.

== Consequences ==
The Japanese authorities responded with unprecedentedly harsh military action. A press blackout was enforced, and Governor General Ishizuka Eizō ordered a counter-offensive of two thousand troops to be sent to Musha, forcing the Seediq to retreat into the mountains and carry out guerrilla attacks by night. Unable to root out the Seediq despite their superior numbers and greater firepower, the Japanese faced a political need for a faster solution. Consequently, Japan's army air corps in Taiwan ordered bombing runs over Musha to smoke out the rebels, dropping mustard gas bombs in what was allegedly the first such use of chemical warfare in Asia. (Note: Meitetsu Haruyama says that instead of mustard gas, hundreds of rounds of tear gas and at least three rounds of a special gas (a combination of cyanide and tear gas) were used. However, it is unclear whether it had any effect or not.) The uprising was swiftly quelled, with any remaining resistance suppressed by the third week of December 1930; Mona Rudao had committed suicide on November 28, but the uprising had continued under other leaders. Of the 1,200 Seediq directly involved in the uprising, 644 died, 290 of whom committed suicide to avoid dishonour. While the Geneva Protocol of 1925 made the wartime use of chemical weapons by land, naval, and air forces a war crime, the treaty does not apply to internal disturbances or conflicts, and Japan was not a signatory to the treaty until May 21, 1975.

Due to internal and external criticism of their handling of the incident, Ishizuka and Hitomi Jirō, his chief civil administrator, were forced to resign in January 1931. However, Ishizuka's replacement, Ōta Masahiro, also took a harsh approach to controlling Taiwan's indigenous peoples: certain tribes were disarmed and left unprotected, giving their aboriginal enemies an opportunity to annihilate them on behalf of the Japanese administration. Around 500 of the Seediq involved in the Musha Incident surrendered and were subsequently confined to a village near Musha. However, on 25 April 1931, indigenous groups working with the Japanese authorities attacked the village, beheading all remaining males over the age of 15. This is known as the "Second Musha Incident".

The uprising did effect a change in the authorities' attitudes and approaches towards aboriginals in Taiwan. Musha had been regarded as the most "enlightened and compliant" of the aboriginal territories, and the colonial power's inability to prevent the massacre provoked a fear of similar nationalist movements starting in Taiwan, Korea, and Japan itself. A change in policy was clearly needed. Ching suggests that the institution of empire-building (kominka 皇民化) became the dominant expression of colonial control: aboriginals came to be seen as imperial subjects on equal footing with other ethnic groups in Taiwan, and were upgraded in status from "raw savages" to takasagozoku (高砂族; "tribal peoples of Taiwan").

During the Musha Incident, the Seediq under Mona Rudao revolted against the Japanese, while the Truku and Toda did not. The rivalry of the Seediq with the Toda and Truku was aggravated by the Musha Incident, given that the Japanese had long played them off against each other. Following the incident, part of Seediq land was ceded to the Truku and Toda by the authority.

== In the media ==
The Musha Incident has been depicted three times in movies, in 1957 in the Taiwanese film Qing Shan bi xue (青山碧血), in the 2003 TV drama Dana Sakura, and in the 2011 Taiwanese film Seediq Bale.

Wu He's novel Remains of Life (originally published in Chinese in 2000; published in English translation in 2017) is a fictionalized account of the aftermath of this incident.

== See also ==
- Mona Rudao
- Five years plan to governing aborigines
- Taiwanese resistance to Japanese colonialism
