= Ren'ai, Nantou =

Mountain indigenous township in Nantou County, Taiwan

Coordinates: 24°02′46.4″N 121°07′49.6″E

Ren'ai Township 仁愛鄉
- Mountain indigenous township
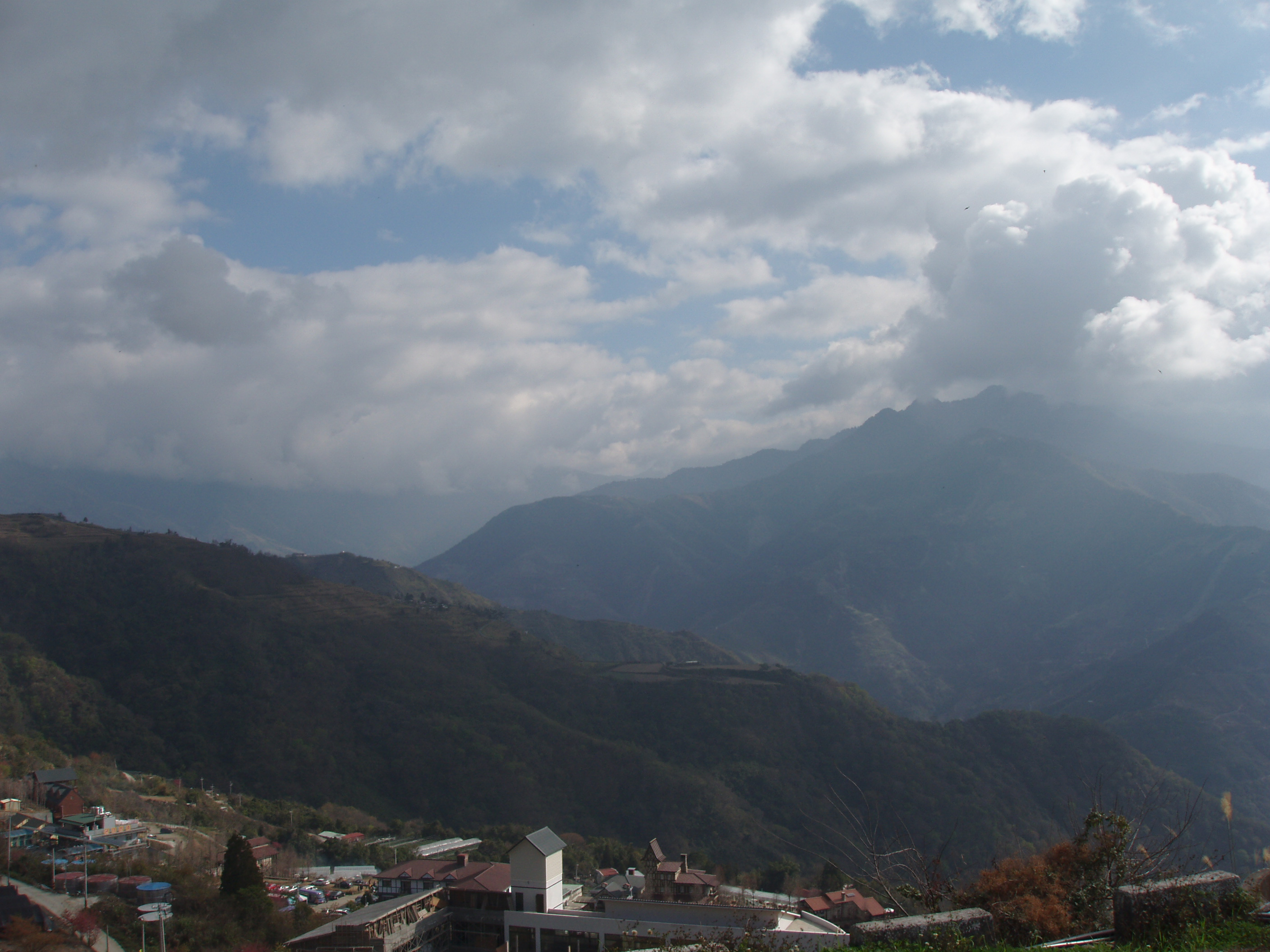

- Ren'ai Township in Nantou County
- Location: Nantou County, Taiwan

Area
  - Total: 1,274 km^{2} (492 sq mi)
- Elevation: 1,669 m (5,476 ft)

Population (March 2023)
  - Total: 15,670
  - Density: 12.30/km^{2} (31.86/sq mi)
- Website: www.renai.gov.tw

Ren'ai Township (Chinese: 仁愛鄉; pinyin: Rén'ài Xiāng; Wade–Giles: Jen^{2}-ai^{4} Hsiang^{1}) is a mountain indigenous township in Nantou County, Taiwan. It has a population total of 15,670 and an area of 1,273.5312 km^{2}, making it the second largest township by area in the county after Xinyi Township. The populations is mainly of the indigenous Seediq, Atayal and Bunun peoples. At an average elevation of 1,669 m (5,476 ft), it is one of the highest settlements in Taiwan.

== Administrative divisions ==
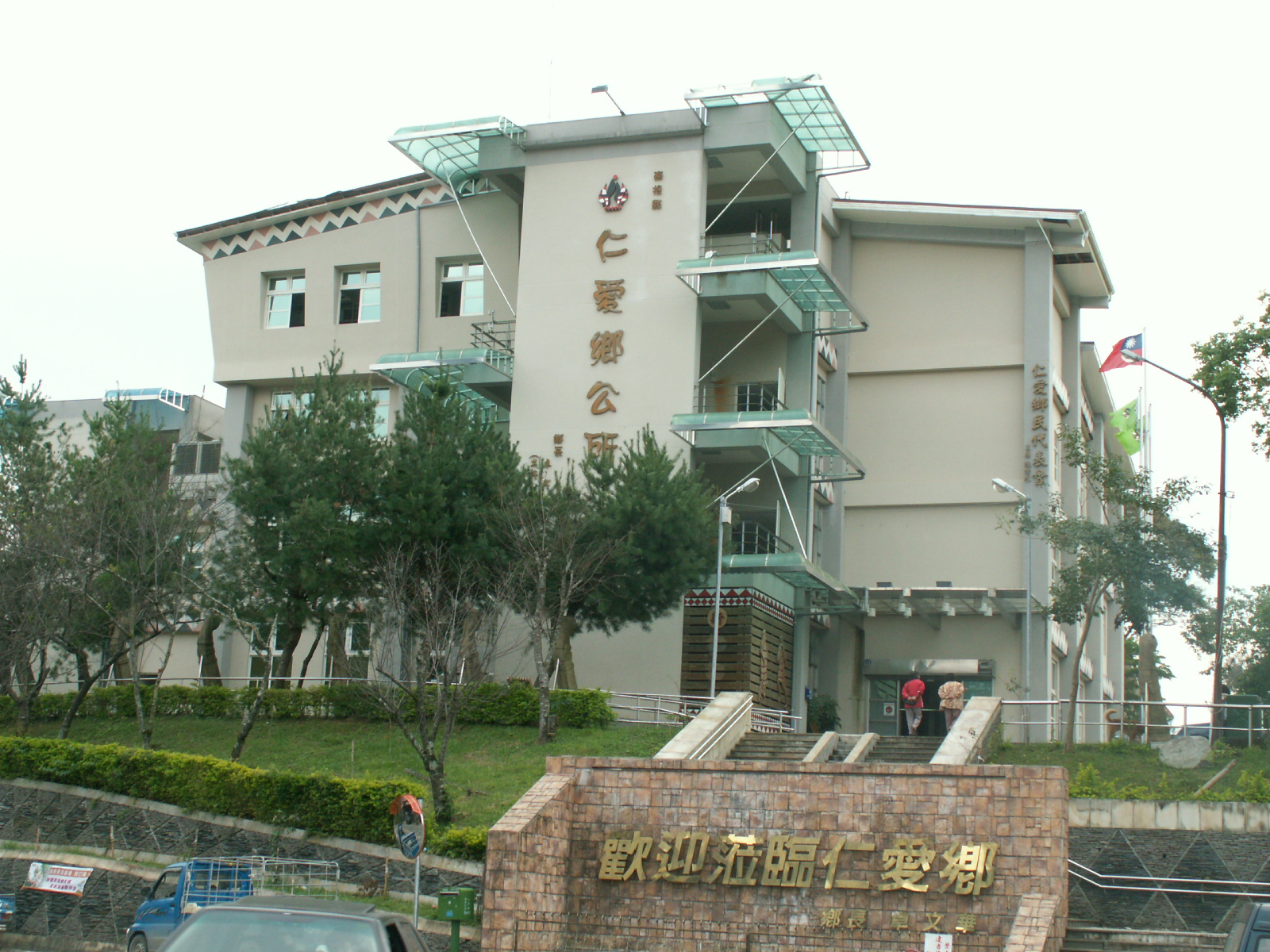
Ren'ai Township Office

Ren'ai Township administrative divisions

- 1 Rongxing Village
- 2 Cuihua Village
- 3 Lixing Village
- 4 Faxiang Village
- 5 Datong Village
- 6 Hezuo Village
- 7 Douda Village
- 8 Jingying Village
- 9 Chunyang Village
- 10 Qinai Village
- 11 Fazhi Village
- 12 Zhongzheng Village
- 13 Wanfeng Village
- 14 Nanfeng Village
- 15 Xinsheng Village
- 16 Huzhu Village

== Tourist attractions ==
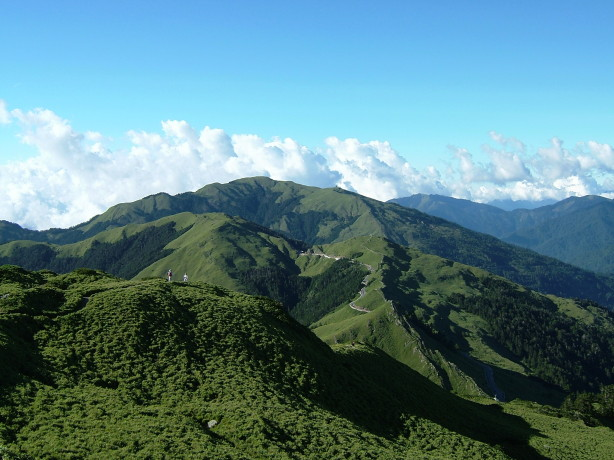
Mount Hehuan

- Aowanda National Forest Recreation Area
- Atayal Resort
- Chuping Archaeological Site
- Huisun Forest Recreation Area
- Mount Hehuan
- Mount Shimen
- Qingjing Farm
- Small Swiss Garden
- Wujie Dam
- Wushe Dam
- Wushe Incident Memorial Park
- Zhuoshe Mountain
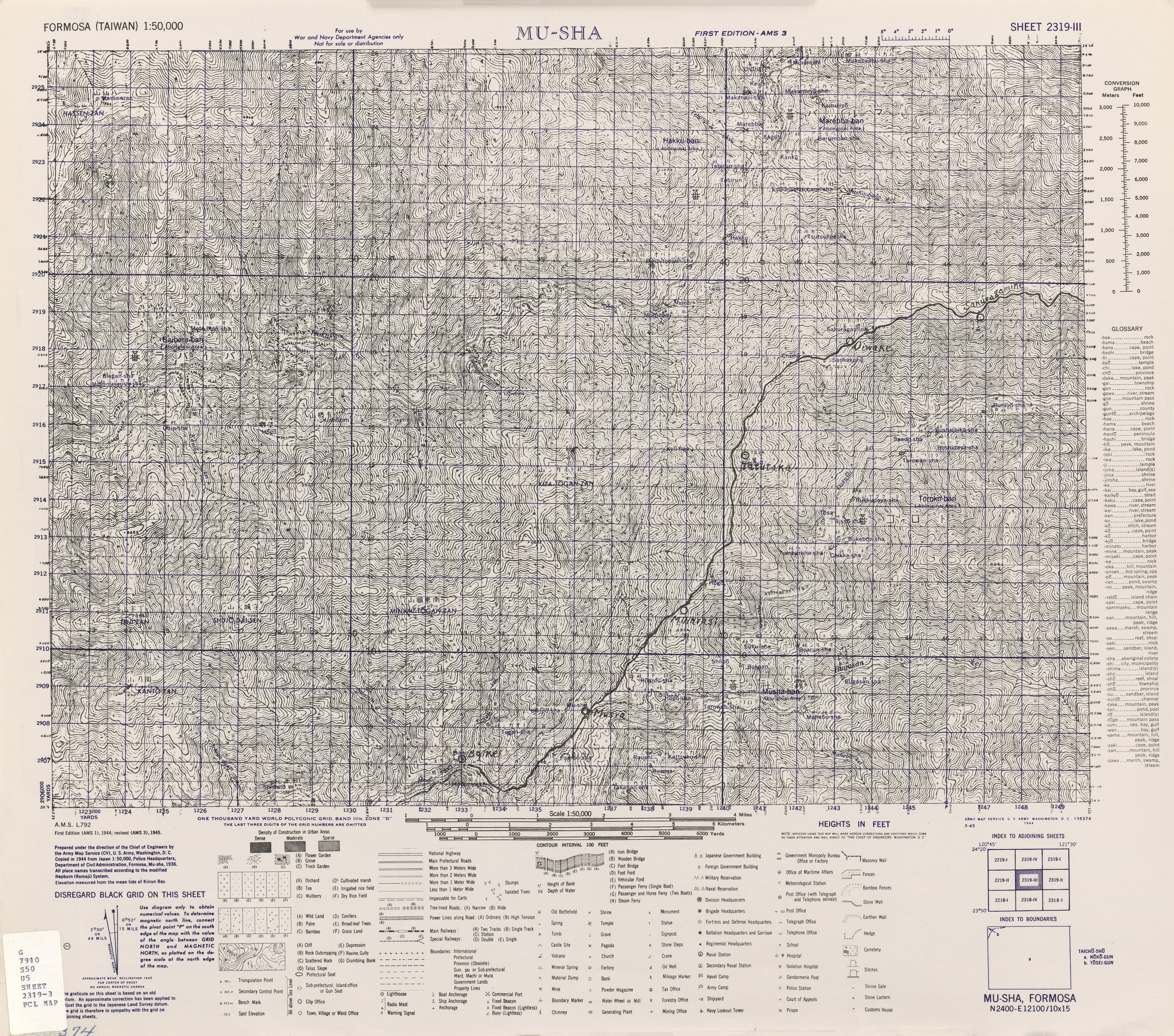
Map of Ren-ai (north) area (1944)

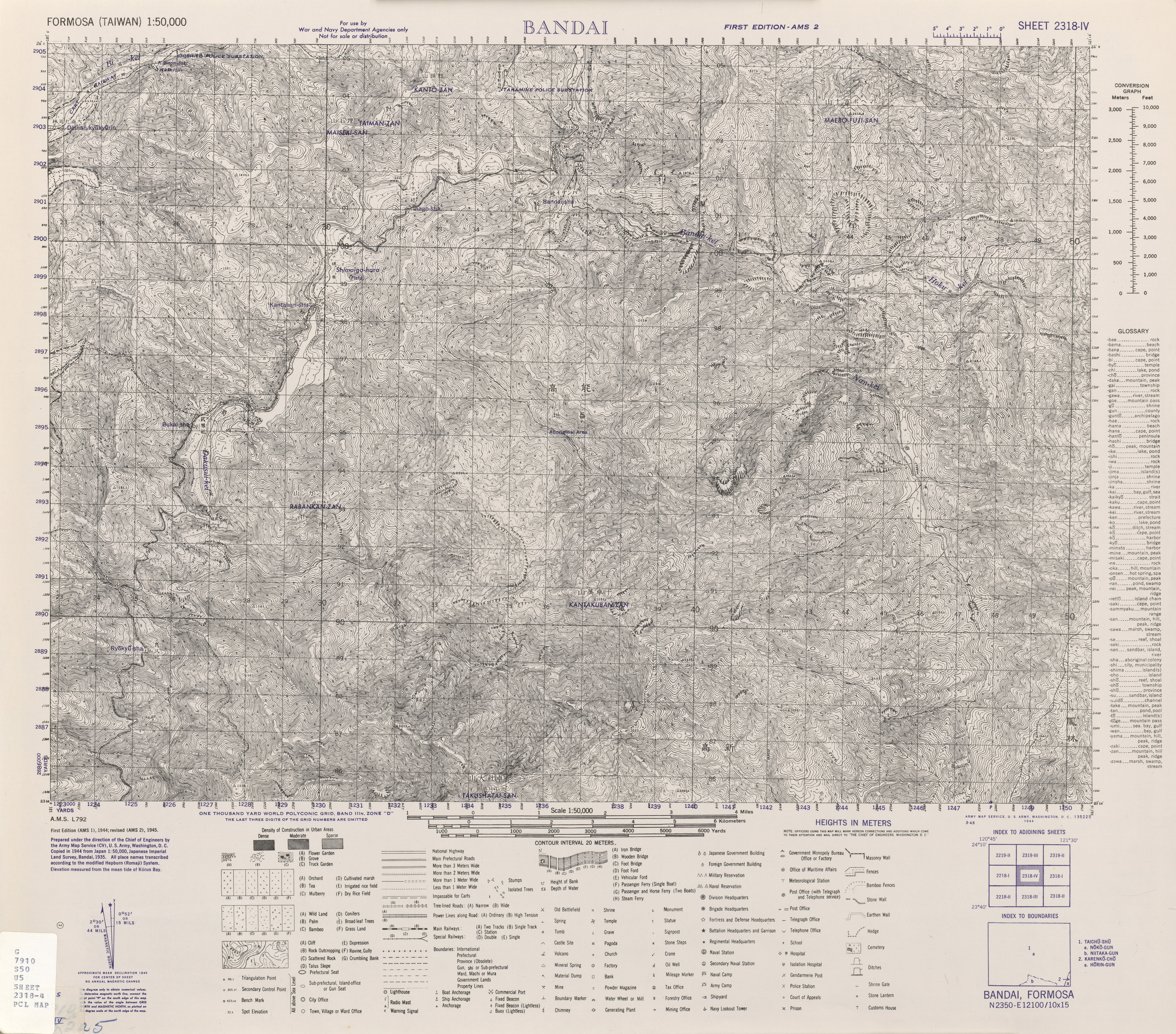
Map of Ren-ai (south) area (1944)

== Climate ==
Climate data for Ren'ai, Nantou (National Taiwan University Highland Experimental Farm), elevation 2,165 m (7,103 ft), (2016–2023 normals, extremes 2016–present)
| Month | Jan | Feb | Mar | Apr | May | Jun | Jul | Aug | Sep | Oct | Nov | Dec | Year |
|---|---|---|---|---|---|---|---|---|---|---|---|---|---|
| Record high °C (°F) | 19.4 (66.9) | 19.5 (67.1) | 22.3 (72.1) | 22.4 (72.3) | 27.8 (82.0) | 25.5 (77.9) | 27.0 (80.6) | 26.8 (80.2) | 25.7 (78.3) | 26.4 (79.5) | 24.3 (75.7) | 21.1 (70.0) | 27.8 (82.0) |
| Mean daily maximum °C (°F) | 12.7 (54.9) | 13.1 (55.6) | 14.5 (58.1) | 17.0 (62.6) | 18.9 (66.0) | 20.0 (68.0) | 21.4 (70.5) | 21.1 (70.0) | 20.8 (69.4) | 19.8 (67.6) | 18.0 (64.4) | 14.8 (58.6) | 17.7 (63.8) |
| Daily mean °C (°F) | 7.8 (46.0) | 8.2 (46.8) | 10.0 (50.0) | 12.4 (54.3) | 14.7 (58.5) | 15.8 (60.4) | 16.6 (61.9) | 16.4 (61.5) | 15.9 (60.6) | 14.5 (58.1) | 12.4 (54.3) | 9.7 (49.5) | 12.9 (55.2) |
| Mean daily minimum °C (°F) | 4.1 (39.4) | 4.4 (39.9) | 6.2 (43.2) | 8.7 (47.7) | 11.6 (52.9) | 12.7 (54.9) | 12.8 (55.0) | 13.0 (55.4) | 12.2 (54.0) | 10.6 (51.1) | 8.5 (47.3) | 5.8 (42.4) | 9.2 (48.6) |
| Record low °C (°F) | −4.5 (23.9) | −4.0 (24.8) | −3.5 (25.7) | −1.4 (29.5) | 6.8 (44.2) | 9.6 (49.3) | 10.0 (50.0) | 10.4 (50.7) | 7.5 (45.5) | 3.5 (38.3) | 1.8 (35.2) | −3.1 (26.4) | −4.5 (23.9) |
| Average precipitation mm (inches) | 119.4 (4.70) | 90.7 (3.57) | 212.2 (8.35) | 231.2 (9.10) | 497.4 (19.58) | 590.1 (23.23) | 303.9 (11.96) | 446.2 (17.57) | 221.9 (8.74) | 112.2 (4.42) | 65.8 (2.59) | 65.0 (2.56) | 2,956 (116.38) |
| Average precipitation days | 10.4 | 9.6 | 13.6 | 14.2 | 19.1 | 23.1 | 19.7 | 21.1 | 17.1 | 11.7 | 9.9 | 9.7 | 179.2 |
| Average relative humidity (%) | 81.0 | 80.8 | 83.3 | 84.7 | 89.0 | 91.5 | 87.9 | 90.9 | 88.8 | 84.5 | 80.8 | 79.6 | 85.2 |
Source 1: Central Weather Administration
Source 2: Atmospheric Science Research and Application Databank (precipitation 2016–2024, precipitation days and humidity 2015–2024)

== See also ==
- Tianchi Lodge
