= 1950 in Taiwan =

- Decades: 1930s; 1940s; 1950s; 1960s; 1970s
- See also: Other events of 1950; History of Taiwan • Timeline • Years

Events from the year 1950 in Taiwan, Republic of China. This year is numbered Minguo 39 according to the official Republic of China calendar.

== Incumbents ==
- President – Chiang Kai-shek
- Vice President – Li Zongren
- Premier – Yan Xishan, Chen Cheng
- Vice Premier – Chu Chia-hua, Chang Li-sheng

== Events ==
=== March ===
- 1 March – Chiang Kai-shek resumes his duties as Chinese president after moving his government to Taipei, Taiwan.

=== June ===
- 18 June – The execution of Chen Yi after believed that he had defected from Kuomintang to the Chinese Communist Party.

=== August ===
- 16 August – The establishment of Yilan County from part of Taipei County.

=== October ===
- 21 October – The establishment of Nantou County Government.

== Births ==
- 25 January – Chen Cheng-sheng, member of Legislative Yuan (1999–2002).
- 5 February – Wei Yao-chien, member of Legislative Yuan (1990–1996).
- 10 March – David Lin, Minister of Foreign Affairs (2012–2016).
- 11 March – Tsai Chuen-horng, Minister and Chairman of Atomic Energy Council (2008–2016).
- 24 March – Shih Yen-shiang, Minister of Economic Affairs (2009–2013).
- 6 April – Tsai Ming-kai, entrepreneur.
- 9 May – Chiou I-jen, Vice Premier of the Republic of China (2007–2008).
- 17 May – Hsieh Fa-dah, Vice Minister of Economic Affairs (2006–2008).
- 10 June – Chen Chu, Mayor of Kaohsiung City.
- 25 June – Chang Chia-juch, Minister of Economic Affairs (2013–2014).
- 26 July – Chang Wen-ying, Mayor of Taichung (1997–2001).
- 21 July – Chiu Wen-ta, Minister of Health and Welfare (2013–2014).
- 12 October – Chen Shui-bian, President of the Republic of China (2000–2008).
- 2 November – Shue Ming-fa, cycling athlete.
- 8 December – Hsieh Shou-shing, Minister of Atomic Energy Council.
- 24 December – Andrew Hsia, Minister of Mainland Affairs Council (2015–2016).

== Deaths ==
- 10 June – Zhu Feng, 44, Chinese Communist Party spy in Taiwan (execution by shooting).
- 18 June – Chen Yi, 67, Chief Executive of Taiwan (execution by shooting).
- 20 December – Fu Ssu-nien, 54, historian, linguist, and writer.
