= 1948 in Taiwan =

- Decades: 1920s; 1930s; 1940s; 1950s; 1960s
- See also: Other events of 1948; History of Taiwan • Timeline • Years

Events in the year 1948 in Taiwan, Republic of China.

== Incumbents ==
- President – Chiang Kai-shek
- Vice President – Li Zongren
- Premier – Zhang Qun, Weng Wenhao, Sun Fo
- Vice Premier – Wang Yun-wu, Ku Meng-yu, Chang Li-sheng, Wu Tiecheng

== Events ==
- 1948 Republic of China legislative election, the first direct elections since the country's founding, were held from 21 to 23 January with the First Legislative Yuan taking office on 18 May
- Taiwan Provincial Common History Historica was established on 1 June in what is now Zhongxing New Village
- CSBC Corporation, a shipbuilding company, split into Taiwan Machinery Corporation and Taiwan Shipbuilding Corporation
- Taiwan Provincial Police Training Facilities became the Taiwan Provincial Police Academy
- Taiwan Provincial Taitung Teachers' School, which later became National Taitung University, was established in Taitung City

== Births ==
- 2 February – Tsai Chih-chung, comic artist
- 25 April – Yu Shyi-kun, Premier of the Republic of China (2002–2005)
- 1 June – Yeh Hsien-hsiu, politician and singer
- 7 July – Chen Ping, actress
- 17 September – Sung Chi-li, Buddhist religious leader
