= 1938 in Taiwan =

- Decades: 1910s; 1920s; 1930s; 1940s; 1950s
- See also: Other events of 1938; History of Taiwan • Timeline • Years

Events from the year 1938 in Taiwan, Empire of Japan.

== Incumbents ==
=== Monarchy ===
- Emperor: Hirohito

=== Central government of Japan ===
- Prime Minister: Fumimaro Konoe

=== Taiwan ===
- Governor-General – Seizō Kobayashi

== Births ==
- 17 May – Chang Chun-hung, Member of Legislative Yuan (1993–2005)
- 19 June – Wu Cheng-wen, biochemist
- 30 June – Hsin Ping, abbot
- 10 October – Chang Fu-mei, Minister of Overseas Chinese Affairs Commission (subsequently Overseas Compatriot Affairs Commission) (2000–2008)
- 7 November – Tien Hung-mao, Chairman of Straits Exchange Foundation (2016–2018)
