= 1940 in Taiwan =

- Decades: 1920s; 1930s; 1940s; 1950s; 1960s
- See also: Other events of 1940; History of Taiwan • Timeline • Years

Events from the year 1940 in Taiwan, Empire of Japan.

== Incumbents ==
=== Monarchy ===
- Emperor: Hirohito

=== Central government of Japan ===
- Prime Minister: Nobuyuki Abe, Mitsumasa Yonai, Fumimaro Konoe

=== Taiwan ===
- Governor-General – Seizō Kobayashi, Kiyoshi Hasegawa

== Births ==
- 20 March – Lin Fong-cheng, Vice Chairperson of Kuomintang (2007–2014)
- 24 June – Su Yu-chang, martial artist, scholar and practitioner of traditional Chinese medicine
- 10 July – Chen Chao-min, Minister of National Defense (2008–2009)
- 29 November – Tang Yao-ming, Minister of National Defense (2002–2004)
