= 1945 in Taiwan =

- Decades: 1920s; 1930s; 1940s; 1950s; 1960s
- See also: Other events of 1945; History of Taiwan • Timeline • Years

Events from the year 1945 in Taiwan.

== Incumbents ==
=== Taiwan under Japanese rule ===
- Emperor: Hirohito
- Prime Minister: Kuniaki Koiso, Kantarō Suzuki, Prince Higashikuni, Kijuro Shidehara
- Governor-General of Taiwan: Rikichi Andō

=== Taiwan under ROC rule ===
- President: Chiang Kai-shek
- Premier: T. V. Soong
- Vice Premier: Weng Wenhao

== Events ==
=== May ===
- 31 May – Taihoku Air Raid.

=== August ===
- 18 August – Indian nationalist leader Subhas Chandra Bose died in a plane crash at Taihoku (Taipei).

=== October ===
- 25 October – Republic of China took Taiwan from Japan.

== Births ==
- 20 October – Shih Shu-Ching, writer.

== Deaths ==
- 24 April – Huang Shihui, 45, writer.
