= 1946 in Taiwan =

- Decades: 1920s; 1930s; 1940s; 1950s; 1960s
- See also: Other events of 1946; History of Taiwan • Timeline • Years

Events in the year 1946 in Taiwan, Republic of China.

== Incumbents ==
- President: Chiang Kai-shek
- Premier: T. V. Soong
- Vice Premier: Weng Wenhao

== Events ==
=== May ===
- 1 May - Taiwan Provincial Consultative Council was established.

=== December ===
- 5 December – Hsinhua earthquake

== Births ==
- 7 April - Chan Wa-yen, flyweight athlete
- 16 June - Ang Ui-jin, linguist
