= 1944 in Taiwan =

- Decades: 1920s; 1930s; 1940s; 1950s; 1960s
- See also: Other events of 1944; History of Taiwan • Timeline • Years

Events from the year 1944 in Taiwan, Empire of Japan.

== Incumbents ==
=== Monarchy ===
- Emperor: Hirohito

=== Central government of Japan ===
- Prime Minister: Hideki Tōjō, Kuniaki Koiso

=== Taiwan ===
- Governor-General – Kiyoshi Hasegawa, Rikichi Andō

== Births ==
- 9 January – Wang Tuoh, Minister of Council for Cultural Affairs (2008).
- 16 April – Lin Ling-san, Minister of Transportation and Communications (2002–2006).
- 10 June – Tu Cheng-sheng, Minister of Economic Affairs (2004–2008).
- 12 June – Chou Ching-yu, Magistrate of Changhua County (1989–1993).
- 15 September – Huang Huang-hsiung, member of Legislative Yuan (1981–1984, 1987–1990, 1993–1996).

== Deaths ==
- 11 June – Teng Yu-hsien, 37, musician.
