= 1952 in Taiwan =

- Decades: 1930s; 1940s; 1950s; 1960s; 1970s
- See also: Other events of 1952; History of Taiwan • Timeline • Years

Events from the year 1952 in Taiwan, Republic of China. This year is numbered Minguo 41 according to the official Republic of China calendar.

== Incumbents ==
- President – Chiang Kai-shek
- Vice President – Li Zongren
- Premier – Chen Cheng
- Vice Premier – Chang Li-sheng

== Events ==
=== April ===
- 28 April – The signing of Sino-Japanese Peace Treaty in Taipei between Japan and the Republic of China.

=== August ===
- 5 August 5 The Sino-Japanese Peace Treaty went into effect to officially end the Second Sino-Japanese War.

== Births ==
- 1 January
  - Chen Hsueh-sheng, Magistrate of Lienchiang County (2001–2009).
  - Wang Ching-feng, Minister of Justice (2008–2010).
- 13 February – Lung Ying-tai, Minister of Culture (2012–2014).
- 28 January – Lin Zi-miao, Magistrate of Yilan County.
- 1 April – Kuo Fang-yu, Minister of Labor (2016–2017).
- 5 April – Li Ang, writer.
- 8 April – Chen Shyh-kwei, Minister of Overseas Community Affairs Council (2013–2016).
- 2 June – Yiin Chii-ming, Minister of the Council for Economic Planning and Development (2012–2013).
- 20 July – Shih Su-mei, Minister of the Directorate-General of Budget, Accounting and Statistics (2008–2016).
- 2 August – Lee Shying-jow, Minister of the Veterans Affairs Council (2016-2018).
- 8 August – Walis Perin, Minister of Council of Indigenous Peoples (2005–2007).
- 13 August – Lee Si-chen, engineer and researcher.
- 21 September – Tung Hsiang-lung, Minister of the Veterans Affairs Council (2013–2016).
- 10 October – Hwang Jung-chiou, Chairman of Taiwan Power Company (2012–2016).
- 27 October – Sheu Yu-jer, Minister of Finance (2016-2018).
- 28 October – Shih Chih-ming, Mayor of Tainan City (1989–1997).
- 6 November – Tsai Ling-yi, Second Lady of the Republic of China (2012–2016).
- 14 November – Yen Teh-fa, Minister of National Defense.
- 8 December – Wang Chung-yi, Minister of Coast Guard Administration (2014–2016).
- 14 December – Lee Chung-wei, Deputy Chairperson of Ocean Affairs Council.
