= 1943 in Taiwan =

- Decades: 1920s; 1930s; 1940s; 1950s; 1960s
- See also: Other events of 1943; History of Taiwan • Timeline • Years

Events from the year 1943 in Taiwan, Empire of Japan.

== Incumbents ==
=== Monarchy ===
- Emperor: Hirohito

=== Central government of Japan ===
- Prime Minister: Hideki Tōjō

=== Taiwan ===
- Governor-General – Kiyoshi Hasegawa

== Births ==
- 6 July – Chen Ding-shinn, hepatologist.
- 29 September – Chen Ding-nan, Minister of Justice (2000–2005).
