= 1939 in Taiwan =

- Decades: 1910s; 1920s; 1930s; 1940s; 1950s
- See also: Other events of 1939; History of Taiwan • Timeline • Years

Events from the year 1939 in Taiwan, Empire of Japan.

== Incumbents ==
=== Monarchy ===
- Emperor: Hirohito

=== Central government of Japan ===
- Prime Minister: Fumimaro Konoe, Kiichirō Hiranuma, Nobuyuki Abe

=== Taiwan ===
- Governor-General – Seizō Kobayashi

== Births ==
- 2 January – Rai Hau-min, President of Judicial Yuan (2010–2016)
- 3 January – Vincent Siew, Vice President of the Republic of China (2008–2012)
- 10 February – Hsieh Shen-shan, Magistrate of Hualien County (2003–2009)
- 16 March – Fan Kuang-chun, Governor of Taiwan Province (2002–2003)
- 1 April – Ma Ju-lung, former actor
- 27 May – Lin Rong-San, Taiwanese politician, publisher and businessman (d. 2015)
- 19 June – Wu Po-hsiung, Chairman of Kuomintang (2007–2009)
- 27 December – Hsu Jung-shu, Member of Legislative Yuan (1981–1984, 1993–2008)
