= 1951 in Taiwan =

- Decades: 1930s; 1940s; 1950s; 1960s; 1970s
- See also: Other events of 1951; History of Taiwan • Timeline • Years

Events from the year 1951 in Taiwan, Republic of China. This year is numbered Minguo 40 according to the official Republic of China calendar.

== Incumbents ==
- President – Chiang Kai-shek
- Vice President – Li Zongren
- Premier – Chen Cheng
- Vice Premier – Chang Li-sheng

== Events ==
=== January ===
- 1 January – The restructuring of Taiwan Cement Limited Corporation to be Taiwan Cement Corporation.
- 21 January – The establishment of Taoyuan County Council.

=== February ===
- 24 February – The establishment of Yilan County Council.

=== May ===
- 21 May – The establishment of TransAsia Airways.

=== July ===
- 15 July – The establishment of Fu Hsing Kang College in Taipei.

=== September ===
- 11 September – The opening of Neiwan Line of Taiwan Railways Administration (Neiwan Station).
- 16 September – The launching of United Daily News.

=== October ===
- 10 October – 40th Double Ten Day.
- 22 October – The start of East Rift Valley earthquakes in eastern Taiwan.

== Births ==
- 9 January – Ho Mei-yueh, Minister of Council for Economic Planning and Development (2007–2008).
- 23 January – Hsu Tain-tsair, Mayor of Tainan (2001–2010).
- 13 February – Lin Ming-chen, Magistrate of Nantou County.
- 9 March – Kao Kuang-chi, Minister of National Defense (2015–2016).
- 15 March – Lin Yu-fang, member of 8th Legislative Yuan (2008-2016).
- 20 March – Liu Shou-ch'eng, Magistrate of Yilan County (1997–2005).
- 22 March – Yang Wen-ke, Magistrate-elect of Hsinchu County.
- 17 April – Chin Hsiao-hui, Deputy Minister of Veterans Affairs Council.
- 4 June
  - Chien Tung-ming, member of Legislative Yuan (2008-2020) (died 2024).
  - Uliw Qaljupayare, member of Legislative Yuan (2008-2017).
- 6 June – Chen Chien-jen, Vice President of the Republic of China.
- 8 June – Shih Shou-chien, Director of National Palace Museum (2004–2006).
- 15 June – Wu Ching-ji, Minister of Education (2009–2012).
- 17 June – Twu Shiing-jer, Mayor of Chiayi City.
- 20 June – Lai Shyh-bao, member of 7th, 8th and 9th Legislative Yuan.
- 1 August – Lee Chin-yung, Magistrate of Yunlin County.
- 23 August – Hung Chi-chang, Chairman of Straits Exchange Foundation (2007–2008).
- 8 September – Ker Chien-ming, acting Chairman of Democratic Progressive Party (2004–2005).
- 25 October – Cho Shih-chao, Vice Minister of Economic Affairs (2014–2016).
- 31 October – Hsiao Yeh, novelist and screenwriter.
- 8 November – Luo Ying-shay, Minister of Justice (2013–2016) (died 2021).
- 10 November – Betty Pei Ti, actress.
- 29 November – Lee Sush-der, Minister of Finance (2008–2012).
- 4 December – Chang Fei, singer.
- 13 December – Lin Chuan, Premier of the Republic of China (2016–2017).

== Deaths ==
- 25 August – Chen Guofu, 58, politician, leader of the CC Clique, and governor of Jiangsu (1933–1937).
