= 1941 in Taiwan =

- Decades: 1920s; 1930s; 1940s; 1950s; 1960s
- See also: Other events of 1941; History of Taiwan • Timeline • Years

Events from the year 1941 in Taiwan, Empire of Japan.

== Incumbents ==
=== Monarchy ===
- Emperor: Hirohito

=== Central government of Japan ===
- Prime Minister: Fumimaro Konoe, Hideki Tōjō

=== Taiwan ===
- Governor-General – Kiyoshi Hasegawa

== Events ==
=== December ===
- 15 December – The opening of Pingtung Line of Taiwan Railways Administration.
- 17 December – The magnitude 7.1 Chungpu earthquake struck western Taiwan.

== Births ==
- 2 January – Tsay Jaw-yang, Minister of Transportation and Communications (1996–1998)
- 20 February – Li Tai-hsiang, former composer and folk songwriter
- 23 June – Tsai Hsun-hsiung, Taiwanese politician
- 27 June – Wang Sing-nan, member of Legislative Yuan (1999–2012)
- 9 August – Michael Tsai, Minister of National Defense (2008)
- 20 August – Huang Chu-wen, Minister of the Interior (1998–2000)
