= 1942 in Taiwan =

- Decades: 1920s; 1930s; 1940s; 1950s; 1960s
- See also: Other events of 1942; History of Taiwan • Timeline • Years

Events from the year 1942 in Taiwan, Empire of Japan.

== Incumbents ==
=== Monarchy ===
- Emperor: Hirohito

=== Central government of Japan ===
- Prime Minister: Hideki Tōjō

=== Taiwan ===
- Governor-General – Kiyoshi Hasegawa

== Events ==
=== April ===
- 1 April – The establishment of Yilan Middle School in Taihoku Prefecture.

=== October ===
- 26 October – The beam raising ceremony for the construction of First Guesthouse in Hōko Prefecture.

== Births ==
- 26 June – Lin Tsung-nan, Magistrate of Nantou County (2001–2005).
- 1 July – Timothy Yang, Minister of Foreign Affairs (2009–2012).
- 21 July – Chang Fu-hsing, Magistrate of Hualien County (2001–2003).
- 20 November – Fan Chen-tsung, Magistrate of Hsinchu County (1989–1997).
