= 1953 in Taiwan =

- Decades: 1930s; 1940s; 1950s; 1960s; 1970s
- See also: Other events of 1953; History of Taiwan • Timeline • Years

Events from the year 1953 in Taiwan, Republic of China. This year is numbered Minguo 42 according to the official Republic of China calendar.

== Incumbents ==
- President – Chiang Kai-shek
- Vice President – Li Zongren
- Premier – Chen Cheng
- Vice Premier – Chang Li-sheng

== Events ==
=== January ===
- 24 January – The opening of Xiluo Bridge connecting Changhua County and Yunlin County.

=== September ===
- 10 September – Yulon Motor Co., Ltd. was established in Taiwan.

=== November ===
- 27 November – Syngman Rhee, President of South Korea, visited Taiwan and met with Chiang Kai-shek, the leader of the Republic of China.

== Births ==
- 1 January – Lu Chia-chen, member of Legislative Yuan (2008–2016)
- 5 February – Wei Kuo-yen, Minister of Environmental Protection Administration (2014–2016)
- 12 February – Katharine Chang, Chairperson of Straits Exchange Foundation (2018–2020)
- 22 February – Tan Ai-chen, actress
- 12 March – Chiang Mu-tsai, manager of Chinese Taipei national football team (1994–2000)
- 16 March – Lee Ying-yuan, Minister of Environmental Protection Administration (2016–2018)
- 5 April – Shu Chin-chiang, Chairperson of Taiwan Solidarity Union (2005–2006)
- 12 April
  - Chiu Kuo-cheng, Director-General of National Security Bureau
  - Wu Hsing-kuo, actor
- 6 May – Lee Chu-feng, Magistrate of Kinmen County (2001–2009)
- 24 May – Chen Wei-zen, Minister of the Interior (2014–2016)
- 13 June – Hsu Ming-tsai, Mayor of Hsinchu City (2009–2014)
- 29 June – Teresa Teng, singer
- 10 July – Su Chih-fen, Magistrate of Yunlin County (2005–2014)
- 17 July – Chiau Wen-yan, member of 8th Legislative Yuan
- 21 July – Sylvia Chang, actress, writer, singer, producer and director
- 20 August – Fong Fei-fei, former singer and actress
- 22 August – Huang Chao-shun, member of Legislative Yuan
- 20 September – Lai Feng-wei, Magistrate of Penghu County
- 24 October – Shih Szu, actress
- 25 October – Ding Kung-wha, Chairperson of Financial Supervisory Commission (2016)
- 10 November – Chen Bao-ji, Minister of Council of Agriculture (2012–2016)

== Deaths ==
- 7 February – Ye Zhao, 60–61, general.
- 9 March – Huo Kuizhang, 51, general.
- 23 June – Li Wenfan, 68, politician.
- 30 October – Wu Zhihui, 88, linguist (Bopomofo), philosopher, and politician.
- 19 November – Wu Tiecheng, 65, politician, Vice Premier of the Republic of China (1948).
