= 1949 in Taiwan =

- Decades: 1920s; 1930s; 1940s; 1950s; 1960s
- See also: Other events of 1949; History of Taiwan • Timeline • Years

Events in the year 1949 in Taiwan, Republic of China.

== Incumbents ==
- President – Chiang Kai-shek
- Vice President – Li Zongren
- Premier – He Yingqin, Yan Xishan
- Vice Premier – Wu Tiecheng, Chia Ching-teh, Chu Chia-hua

== Events ==
=== January ===
- 5 January – Chen Cheng became a Chairperson of Taiwan Province Provincial Government.

=== June ===
- 6 June – The establishment of China News.
- 15 June – The replacement of Old Taiwan dollar with New Taiwan dollar.

=== October ===
- 25–27 October – Battle of Guningtou in Kinmen, Fujian.

=== December ===
- 8 December – The Republic of China becomes exiled from mainland China, despite being a widely recognized UN member state, moved to Taipei as the de facto capital.
- 21 December – Chen Cheng left as Chairperson of Taiwan Province Provincial Government.
- 30 December – The establishment of Roman Catholic Archdiocese of Taipei.

== Births ==
- 20 January – Lin Bih-jaw, Secretary-General of the Presidential Office (2016)
- 13 February – Yeh Chu-lan, Vice Premier (2004–2005)
- 14 June – Peng Pai-hsien, Magistrate of Nantou County (2001)
- 28 September – Hsieh Ing-dan, police officer
- 29 September – Liu Kuo-chuan, Deputy Minister of Veterans Affairs Council.
- 1 September – Chang Sheng-ford, Minister of Finance.
- 8 October – Cheng Yung-chin, Magistrate of Hsinchu County (2001–2009)
- 13 October – Sean Chen, former Premier of the Republic of China.
- 30 October – Lin Chiang-yi, Minister of Council of Indigenous Peoples.
- 14 November – Yen Ming, Minister of National Defense.
