= 1880 in Taiwan =

- Decades: 1860s; 1870s; 1880s; 1890s; 1900s
- See also: Other events of 1880; History of Taiwan • Timeline • Years

Events from the year 1880 in Taiwan, Qing Dynasty.

== Incumbents ==
- Emperor – Guangxu Emperor

== Births ==
- 21 May – Mona Rudao, Seediq chief
