= 1683 in Taiwan =

- Decades: 1660s; 1670s; 1680s; 1690s; 1700s
- See also: Other events of 1683; History of Taiwan • Timeline • Years

Events from the year 1683 in Taiwan.

== Events ==
- 8 July — after extensive preparation, Shi Lang led a force of 300 warships and 20,000 soldiers out of Tongshan, Fujian.
- 5 September - Shi Lang received Zheng Keshuang's offer to surrender.
- 3 October - Shi Lang reached Taiwan and formally obtained the capitulation of Liu Guoxuan and Zheng Keshuang.

== Bibliography ==
- Wong, Young-tsu (2017). China’s Conquest of Taiwan in the Seventeenth Century: Victory at Full Moon. Springer. ISBN 978-9811022470.
- Lowell Dittmer (2017). Taiwan and China: Fitful Embrace. Univ of California Press. ISBN 978-0-520-29598-8.
