= 1899 in Taiwan =

- Decades: 1870s; 1880s; 1890s; 1900s; 1910s
- See also: Other events of 1899; History of Taiwan • Timeline • Years

Events from the year 1899 in Taiwan, Empire of Japan.

== Incumbents ==
=== Monarchy ===
- Emperor: Meiji

=== Central government of Japan ===
- Prime Minister – Yamagata Aritomo

=== Taiwan ===
- Governor-General – Kodama Gentarō

== Events ==
=== July ===
- 20 July – The opening of Badu Station in Taihoku Prefecture.
