= Battle of Niangziguan =

1947 battle

- Part of the Chinese Civil War
| Date | April 24, 1947 – April 25, 1947 |
| Location | Eastern Shanxi, China |
| Result | Communist victory |

Belligerents
| Flag of the National Revolutionary Army National Revolutionary Army | PLA People's Liberation Army |

Commanders and leaders
| Unknown | Unknown |

Strength
| 1,000 | 2,000 |

Casualties and losses
| 1,000 | Minor |

The Battle of Niangziguan (Niangziguan Zhandou, 娘子关战斗) was fought between the communists and the nationalists during the Chinese Civil War in the post World War II era and resulted in communist victory. The battle was a critical one in Zhengtai Campaign that helped to determine the outcome of the campaign.

Order of battle

- Nationalist (1,000 total)
  - Shanxi 4th Security Regiment
- Communist (2,000 total)
  - 7th Brigade of Shanxi-Chahar-Hebei Military Region

Niangziguan (literally means Women's Pass, with Niangzi means women, and Guan means pass) was a strategically important pass that was easy to defend but difficult to attack. The nationalist 4th Security Regiment of Shanxi, totaling around 1,000, defended the pass.

On April 24, 1947, the communist 7th Brigade of the Shanxi-Chahar-Hebei Military Region reached the pass, but instead of immediately attacking the defenders’ positions, the attackers sent out troops to outflank the defenders and penetrated the defenders’ position under the cover of darkness in the night. At 3:00 AM on April 25, 1947, communist forces finally attacked under the cover of artillery shelling. The defenders immediately came out of their fortifications to counterattack, but this proved to be a great mistake: venturing out of their fortifications allowed the defenders to be sealed off by the attacking enemy into several isolated groups that could not support each other, and without the fortifications, the stranded defenders were annihilated within three hours.

The communist victory ensured the control of the strategic pass and secured the safe passage of future troop movements for themselves while blocking the passage of nationalists, thus helped the communist to achieve final victory in Zhengtai Campaign.

== See also ==
- Outline of the Chinese Civil War
- National Revolutionary Army
- History of the People's Liberation Army
