= 1622 in Taiwan =

- Decades
- See also: Other events of 1622; History of Taiwan • Timeline • Years

Events from the year 1622 in Taiwan.

== Events ==
- Dutch East India Company occupied Penghu.
