= 1895 in Taiwan =

- Decades: 1870s; 1880s; 1890s; 1900s; 1910s
- See also: Other events of 1895; History of Taiwan • Timeline • Years

Events from the year 1895 in Taiwan.

== Incumbents ==
- Governor of Taiwan Province (Qing dynasty of China): Tang Jingsong
- Governor-General of Taiwan (Japan): Kabayama Sukenori

== Events ==
=== July ===
- 29 May – The start of Japanese invasion of Taiwan.
- 18 June – The establishment of National Taiwan University Hospital.
