= Wu Cheng-wen =

Wu Cheng-wen may refer to:

- Wu Cheng-wen (biochemist) (born 1938), Taiwanese biochemist
- Wu Cheng-wen (engineer), Taiwanese engineer, academic administrator, and politician
