= 1900 in Taiwan =

- Decades: 1880s; 1890s; 1900s; 1910s; 1920s
- See also: Other events of 1900; History of Taiwan • Timeline • Years

Events from the year 1900 in Taiwan, Empire of Japan.

== Incumbents ==
=== Monarchy ===
- Emperor: Meiji

=== Central government of Japan ===
- Prime Minister – Yamagata Aritomo, Itō Hirobumi

=== Taiwan ===
- Governor-General – Kodama Gentarō
