= Hwang Jung-chiou =

Taiwanese politician (born 1952)

- 黃重球

Chairman of Taiwan Power Company
- In office 15 May 2012 – 29 July 2016
- President: Lee Han-shen; Chu Wen-chen
- Preceded by: Edward K. M. Chen
- Succeeded by: Chu Wen-chen

Vice Minister of Ministry of Economic Affairs of the Republic of China
- In office 2009–2012
- Minister: Shih Yen-shiang

Personal details
- Born: 10 October 1952 (age 74)
- Education: Chung Yuan Christian University (BS); National Chiao Tung University (MS, PhD)

Hwang Jung-chiou (Chinese: 黃重球; pinyin: Huáng Zhòngqiú; born 10 October 1952) was a Taiwanese engineer who was the chairman of Taiwan Power Company (Taipower), the state-owned electric power utility company of the Republic of China, from 2012 until 2016. Previously, he had served as the Vice Minister of the Ministry of Economic Affairs of the Republic of China from 2009 to 2012.

== Education ==
Hwang obtained his bachelor's degree in electronics engineering from Chung Yuan Christian University in 1975. He then obtained his master's degree in computer engineering from National Chiao Tung University in 1979 and earned a Ph.D. in information engineering from the same university in 1989.

== Taipower chairmanship ==
=== Chairmanship appointment ===
Hwang was appointed as the chairman of Taipower in May 2012 due to public outcry over the hikes of electricity and fuel rates in that year.

=== Taiwan's fourth nuclear power plant ===
Speaking in February 2013 regarding the controversial Longmen Nuclear Power Plant construction in Gongliao, New Taipei, Hwang said that Taipower had already asked geologists to evaluate any possible condition so that Taipower can deal with the issues seriously. He further added that Taipower will keep continue to improving its performance by the end of that year. He also hoped that the increase of electricity prices may help to offset the loss by having higher fuel price for power generation made by Taipower.

=== Chairmanship resignation ===
Hwang tendered his resignation in July 2016 citing health reasons.
