= Cai Qian =

Chinese pirate

- 蔡牽
- Born: 1761; Tong'an District, Fujian, Qing dynasty
- Died: 1809 (aged 47–48); Wenzhou, Zhejiang, Qing dynasty
- Occupations: Sea merchant, pirate
- Era: Qing dynasty
- Spouse: Cai Qian Ma (m. 1799; died 1804)

Cai Qian (simplified Chinese: 蔡牵; traditional Chinese: 蔡牽; pinyin: Cài Qiān; 1761 – 1809) was a Chinese sea merchant and pirate during the Qing dynasty.

== Biography ==
According to Antony, "The decimation of several major Fujian and Zhejiang gangs, as well as the demise of the Tâyson pirates, between 1800 and 1802, gave Cai Qian a chance to gain dominance in the region. He quickly moved to absorb the scattered remnants of the Phoenix Tail, Bamboo Yellow, and Water Bay gangs, whose leaders had been killed in 1800, and then strengthened his own position by murdering a renegade subordinate named Hou Qitian in 1801."

Cai Qian was born in Tong'an District, which is a county in the prefecture of Quanzhou in Fujian, China. This information is, however, not consistent with the account found in other sources. For example, a contemporary scholar called Jiao Xun identified Zhangzhou as Cai's birthplace while official records show - based on a report by the governor-general of Fujian to the emperor (during Ruan Yuan's time as a governor) - that Cai came from the village of Xiapu, also in Tong'an County.

There is very little information about his early life except that he lived a hard life, first working as a peasant and then a fisherman. Due to starvation, he became a pirate in 1794. He was, thereafter, described by fellow pirates as small in stature but quite ambitious, stopping at nothing to rise through the ranks. He was said to have used his own wife to entice a rival into a trap. His cunning and ambition allowed him to thrive in the constantly warring gangs and pirate chieftains in the South China Sea.

At the height of his power, he and Cheung Po Tsai commanded hundreds of ships and thousands of pirates; he was Cheung's mate. They predated others on the seas of Fujian, Guangdong and Taiwan Strait and came to be considered a major threat to Chinese political stability. Because the British businessmen sold English guns to Cheung, the Qianlong Emperor became angry with the British. The Qianlong Emperor blamed George Macartney over this issue, leading to Chinese hostility towards the United Kingdom during the Chinese Rites controversy. In 1799, Cai married a weapons expert best known by her nickname Cai Qian Ma (simplified Chinese: 蔡牵妈; traditional Chinese: 蔡牽媽; lit. 'wife of Cai Qian') who spoke English. Her expertise may have been beneficial to their accumulation of wealth. Some diaries say her name was Lin Yuyao (林玉腰) and that she had lived in Fangyuan, Changhua, Taiwan.

In 1802, Cai occupied Xiamen's cannon bases. In the battle of 1804 in Luermen, Taiwan, Cai defeated the Qing fleet from Wenzhou. Later, Li Changgeng, the governor of Zhejiang, led his fleet to suppress the rebellion and defeated Cai Qian in Dinghai.

The following year in 1805, Cai Qian proclaimed himself "King of Zhenhai" (simplified Chinese: 镇海王; traditional Chinese: 鎮海王) and sailed his fleet into Fengshan (now Fengshan District, Kaohsiung) and surrounded it. In December 1807, Li Changgeng and Zhang Jiansheng, the Admiral of the Fujian Navy, attacked Cai Qian in the outer waters of Heishui, Guangdong. With only three large ships left, Cai Qian's ship fired cannons and guns at the stern of the naval ship. Li was shot in the throat and killed.

In January 1808, Fujian and Zhejiang admirals Wang Delu and Qiu Lianggong nearly destroyed Cheung and Cai's fleet near Hong Kong in a battle that lasted one day and night. They succeeded in defeating their enemies, causing the Qing navy to begin fearing Cheung and Cai.

In 1809, Wang Delu (now Captain general of the Fujian navy) and Qiu Lianggong surrounded Cai Qian and his fleet off the coast of Wenzhou (溫州) in Zhejiang. Outnumbered and lacking the strength to escape the encirclement, Cai committed suicide by blowing up his own ship along with his 250 followers. His remaining 4,000 troops surrendered. Legend also says that he committed suicide by either shooting himself with a golden bullet or jumping into the sea with a golden anchor. Rumors claim that Cai had a great treasure that was hidden on the Matsu Islands. It has never been found.
