= Chen Cheng-sheng =

Taiwanese historian and politician

Chen Cheng-sheng MLY
- 陳振盛

Member of the Legislative Yuan
- In office 1 February 1999 – 31 January 2002
- Constituency: Changhua County

Personal details
- Born: 25 January 1950 (age 76) Wandan, Mingjian, Nantou County, Taiwan
- Party: Minkuotang (2015–2019); Non-Partisan Solidarity Union (2009); Kuomintang (?–2009); People First Party (2000s; 2011–15); New Party (1997)
- Education: Shih Hsin University (BA); National Chung Hsing University (MA); Tunghai University (MPA); Chinese Culture University (PhD)

Chen Cheng-sheng (Chinese: 陳振盛; pinyin: Chén Zhènshèng; born 26 January 1950) is a Taiwanese historian and politician who served in the Legislative Yuan from 1999 to 2002.

== Education ==
Chen graduated from Shih Hsin University with a bachelor's degree. He then earned a master's degree from National Chung Hsing University, a Master of Public Policy (M.P.P.) from Tunghai University, and a Ph.D. in history from Chinese Culture University.

== Political career ==
After graduation, Chen worked for the Taiwan Provincial Government and grew close to Chiang Ching-kuo. He represented the New Party in the 1997 Nantou County magistracy election, but withdrew from the party after losing to Peng Pai-hsien. Chen was elected to the legislature as an independent in 1998. In 2000, he joined the People First Party and was named the PFP's caucus leader. Chen also served as the party's spokesperson. In 2009, Chen ran for the Nantou County Magistracy as a Non-Partisan Solidarity Union candidate after his expulsion from the Kuomintang. He finished third in the election. In August 2011, Chen was named the People First Party candidate for Taipei 6th district. He was linked to Hsu Hsin-ying in 2015, who later split from the Kuomintang to found her own party, the Minkuotang.
