= Zhu Yigui =

- Zhongxing King
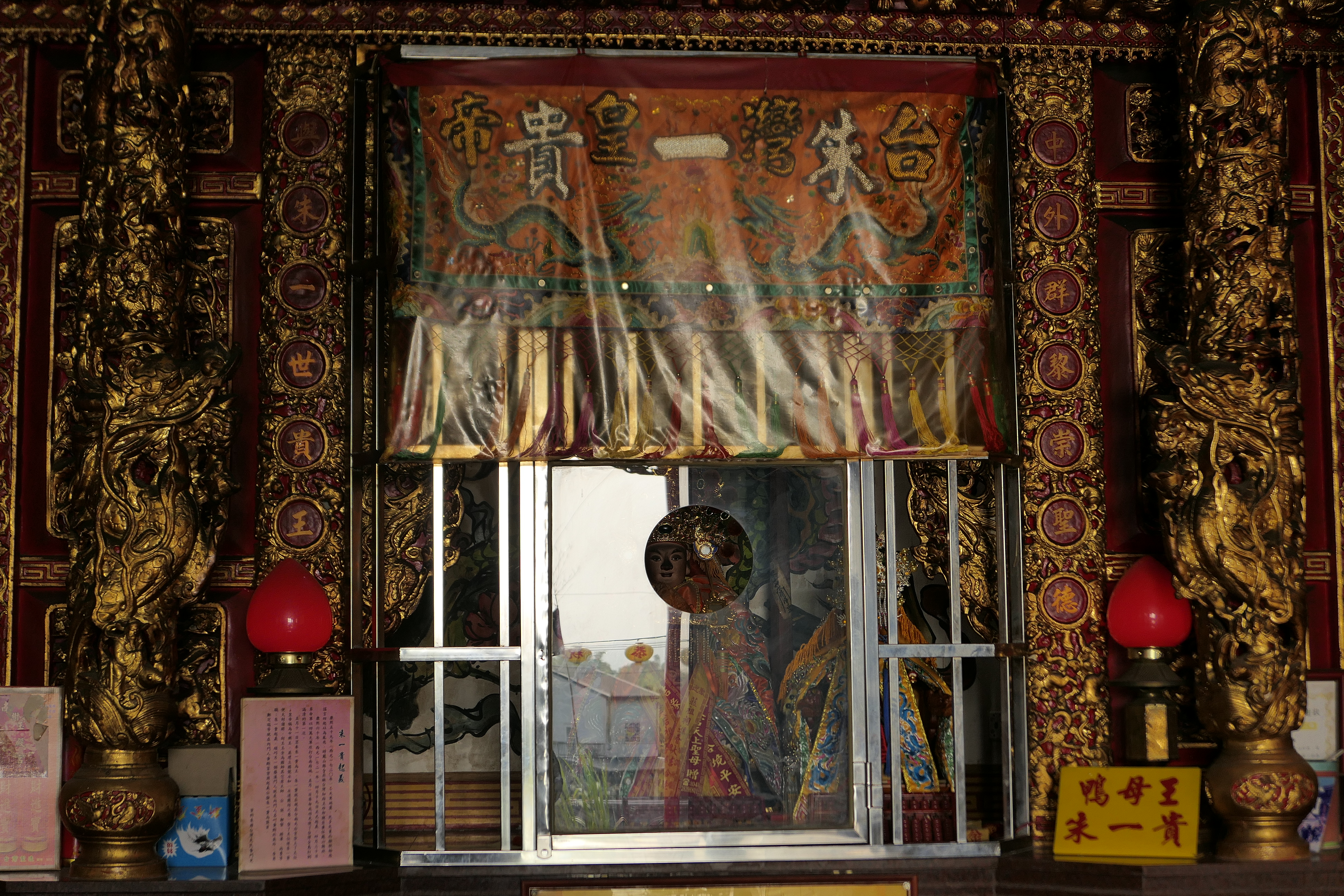
- Shrine dedicated to Zhu Yigui in the Xing-an Temple, Neimen, Kaohsiung. The banner reads "Zhu Yigui, Emperor of Taiwan."
- Born: 19 June 1690
- Died: 22 February 1722 (aged 31)
Era name and dates
- Yonghe (永和): 26 May 1721 – 30 July 1721

Zhu Yigui (Chinese: 朱一貴; pinyin: Zhū Yīguì; Pe̍h-ōe-jī: Chu It-kùi; 19 June 1690 – 22 February 1722) was a rebel leader of a Taiwanese uprising against Qing dynasty rule in mid-1721.

He came from Zhangzhou and was of humble peasant origin. He was of Hokkien ancestry and lived in the village of Lohanmen located in the area of modern-day Neimen District, Kaohsiung. There he worked raising ducks and was a respected member of the local community. In 1721 an earthquake wrought havoc to Lohanmen, even more the prefect of the island, Wang Zhen (prefect), not only kept collecting heavy taxes even among the impoverished people who lost their possessions with the earthquake.

Zhu was one of those who rose in rebellion and his good reputation among the locals gave him enough followers so that on 19 April he attacked and captured the city of Kua-chin-na (Chinese: 竿津林/竿蓁林/菅蓁林; Pe̍h-ōe-jī: Koaⁿ-chin-nâ; modern-day Gangshan). Other rebel leaders also rose on the island, and Qing authorities were heavily pressured.

Zhu and Du Junying (another rebel commander of Teochew descent) combined their forces and launched an attack on the seat of Tainan Prefecture, the administrative capital of the island, which fell almost without a fight. The Qing authorities retreated to Penghu. The rebel army continued its movement on the western coastal plains. On 1 May, Zhu took the title of Zhongxing Wang (中興王; "Reviving King") and the era name Yong He (永和; "Enduring Peace"), he also established an administration reminiscent of the Ming dynasty.

His power started to weaken after disputes with Du Junying, which spelled disaster for the rebels, as this occurred at the same time the Manchu government organized an expedition against them. Imperial forces commanded by Shi Shipiao (d. 1721 at the age of 55 sui) and Lan Tingzhen (1664–1730), landed on 16 June and on 28 June Zhu was captured and executed.
