= Yu Zisan Incident =

1947 student death during the Chinese Civil War

- Part of Chinese Communist Revolution
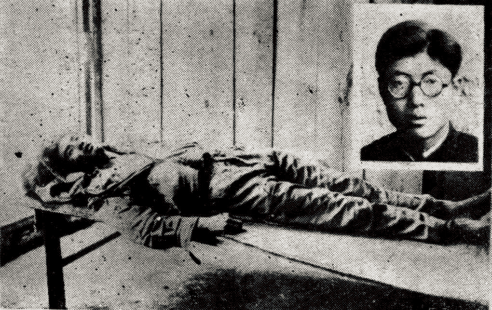
- The dead body of Yu Zisan at the Hangzhou Garrison Headquarters
- Native name: 于子三事件
- Time: October 1947- March 1948
- Location: Hangzhou, China
- Type: Student protests Cause célèbre

The Yu Zisan Incident, also known as Yu Tse-san Incident, was a series of political events ignited by the death of Yu Zisan, then 23-year-old chairman of the Students' Autonomous Association (SAA) at National Che Kiang University (NCKU) during the Chinese Civil War. Suspected of links with communist factions, Yu was detained on 25 October 1947 at Hangzhou Garrison Headquarters and died there five days later. The Nationalist government asserted that Yu committed suicide fearing conviction, a claim the university did not endorse. His death, widely seen as a government effort to quell student activism, sparked widespread anti-government protests across China in November and December 1947.

== Background ==
=== Post-war student activism ===
Post World War II, China witnessed intense political and military rivalry between Kuomintang (KMT), the then-ruling party, and the Chinese Communist Party (CCP), the principal opposition. This struggle for national supremacy was particularly fierce in the Yangtze Delta. In the summer of 1947, Chiang Ching-kuo, son of the KMT leader Chiang Kai-shek, launched student campaigns in Suzhou and Jiaxing. These initiatives were part of a strategic response to counteract the CCP's ideological influence among students. This period saw Chiang's supporters eventually gaining control over the Students' Autonomous Association (SAA) at NCKU. Simultaneously, the local CCP appointed Hong Deming to discreetly expand its influence within student groups. In response to diminishing student backing, Hong travelled to Hangzhou, where he established a local branch of the New Democratic Youth Federation (YF). Additionally, he formed a clandestine Communist faction within the Students' Autonomous Association (SAA). These moves were strategically aimed at regaining control over the SAA in the forthcoming elections.

=== Yu Zisan ===
Yu Zisan, also known as Yu Tse-san, was born into an educated family in Mouping, Shandong, in 1924. He received his early education at Zhifu Middle School from 1938 to 1941. Following this, he furthered his studies at Peking Academy, where he attended senior high school starting in 1941, but later went to National No. 22 Middle School, a wartime high school in Fuyang, Anhui. There he became a member of KMT-backed San-min Chu-i Youth Corps. In October 1944, Yu Zisan enrolled in NCKU's College of Agriculture, relocated to Yongxing, Guizhou during the Sino-Japanese War. At NCKU, he transitioned from the San-min Chu-i Youth Corps to the NCKU Frontline Aid Group, aiding the Chinese army in the battles. Post-war, the university returned to Hangzhou. In 1946, Yu joined the covert student society 'New Tide' and was elected SAA chairman, leading protests against the Peiping rape case and against hunger, civil war and political suppression. Sympathetic to leftist ideologies, Yu Zisan joined YF in September 1947. Yu was invited to be a member of CCP in September 1947, but he never officially became a member of CCP.

== Arrest, rescue attempts and death ==
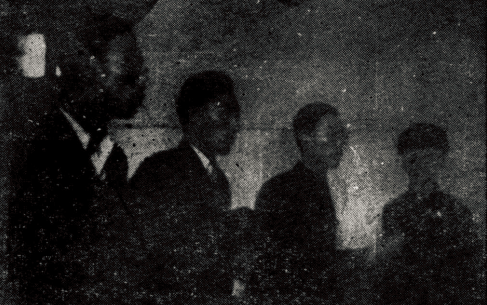
The arrested students in the court

On 25 October 1948, following his attendance at a NCKU alumnus' wedding in Hangzhou's city centre, Yu Zisan visited Datong Inn. There, he and three other NCKU students – Chen Jianxin, Huang Shimin, and Li Bojin – were apprehended by agents from the Central Bureau of Investigation and Statistics (CBIS), the KMT secret police. Chen and Yu were taken to the prison at the Hangzhou Garrison Headquarters, while Huang and Li were detained at a local police office.

During the search of the students' possessions, Chen's letters were discovered, outlining plans to establish 'New Tide', a new organisation involving Yu, based on profits from a peace orchard in Fenghua. Additionally, books deemed Communist, including Shen Zhiyuan's 'The Academic History of Modern Economics' and Karl Marx's 'The Poverty of Philosophy' and 'Wage Labour and Capital', were found in Chen's belongings. Huang's possessions contained 'The Secrets of America' and 'The Russia Problem' along with 'The Prospect' magazine. The students asserted these books were intended for sharing with others.

On 26 October, SAA members informed university President Chu Coching of the arrests. Chu urged the government to initiate legal proceedings if evidence warranted or otherwise, he would post bail for the students. Zhejiang Garrison head Zhu Mingtao indicated to Chu that the students were likely Communist bandits. Despite Chu's insistence on judicial handling, the Hangzhou police head claimed the evidence was substantial and a court hearing would occur within a day or two. The SAA decided to strike if the students weren't heard by 29 October. Chu made further inquiries on 28 and 29 October and was planning to meet Zhejiang Governor Shen Honglie when he learnt of Yu's alleged suicide at 18:30 on 29 October.

== Protests and demonstrations ==
=== Initial developments ===
On 26 October, upon learning Yu's arrest, the NCKU branch of CCP, headed by Xu Liangying, urgently convened at the School of Engineering. Xu surmised that the arrest targeted their organisation, given Yu's knowledge of individuals and entities within the SAA linked to CCP. Due to the recent influx of new members in the communist organisation, Xu endeavoured to reassure them and sought to leverage public opinions, including the SAA and the wider university community, in efforts to secure Yu's release.

Following Yu Zisan's death, Chu Coching, the president of NCKU, accompanied by university staff doctor Li Tianzhu, rushed to the Garrison Headquarters. Li confirmed Yu had been deceased for at least six hours. Chu, examining Yu's police deposition, noted inconsistencies with Yu's usual writing during exams, leading him to dispute the police's conclusion. An autopsy, organised by Chu with university faculty and students, was conducted the next day. It ascertained Yu's death by asphyxia, caused by throat cuts from broken glass leading to tracheal blockage. However, it didn't conclusively determine if Yu's death was suicide or murder, and also indicated Yu had been tortured one or two days prior to his death.

The Hangzhou authorities implemented a city-wide curfew and imposed censorship on news, mail, telegrams, and phone communications. Concurrently, the Ministry of Education advised universities against supporting the student strike at NCKU. The government maintained their stance that Yu had committed suicide due to fear of prosecution for his alleged involvement as a 'Communist bandit'.

Defying government measures, NCKU students commenced a three-day strike starting on 30 October. On the same day, Hong Deming arrived in Hangzhou from Shanghai, meeting with the university committee of CCP at Xu's office. Hong informed local CCP members that the party aimed to leverage this event to launch a nationwide campaign against political prosecution and announced that he would be residing in Hangzhou to facilitate this campaign.

By 2 November, the situation intensified as CCP won over 70 of the 91 seats in SAA's general election.

=== Escalation ===
On 30 October, the university administration decided to publish details about Yu's death. On 31 October, Chu Coching convened a faculty meeting, deciding on a one-day strike on Monday 3 November. Shen Honglie, the governor of Zhejiang, and the Ministry of Education, for fear of the nationwide impact, attempted to negotiate with Chu to retract the decision. Chu responded that it was not possible to retract the decision because it was already weekend. Chu then softened his position on 2 November that the university faculty would not officially strike on Monday, while there may be insufficient time to inform every faculty member of this decision.

Under mounting pressure from local authorities in Hangzhou, Chiang Kai-shek was compelled to respond on 2 November. He instructed the local government to maintain a firm position, yet he chose not to issue a public statement. After a meeting with Zhu Jiahua on 5 November for further deliberation, Chiang directed that a trial be conducted as promptly as possible and ordered a comprehensive investigation into the circumstances surrounding Yu's death.

The first report of Yu's death was published by the university's president office on Ta Kung Pao on 2 November. Chu accepted an interview with Shen Bao journalists in Nanjing on 5 November, during which Chu claims that what made Yu dead and what caused the wounds require further investigation and asserted that "the final outcome will judge whether the government has sufficient spirits of rule of law, and whether it is willing to protect human rights." The interview was published on both Shen Bao and Ta Kung Pao on 6 November.

This significant CCP victory in the SAA election led the SAA to extend the strike and expand their campaign by involving local middle school students. National Tsing Hua University initiated its strike on 5 November. The following day, Yenching University, National Peking University, Université Franco-Chinoise, and other universities in Beiping organised memorial events for Yu, attracting around 5,000 participants. Chiao Tung University in Shanghai started a strike on 8 November, with The Great China University and St. John's University joining in on 11 and 12 November, respectively. NCKU students recommenced their strike on 10 November.

On learning the upcoming student activism on 8 November, Chiang became concerned that the hard stance of the government may provoke outrage and ordered the local authorities to halt student activism as soon as possible. On 20 November, a local court in Hangzhou sentenced the three students arrested with Yu to seven years in jail. After the court ruling, the SAA resolved to appeal to the Supreme Court and organised another strike to demonstrate against the perceived injustice. The students eventually resumed their studies on 24 November.

=== Funeral and burial ===
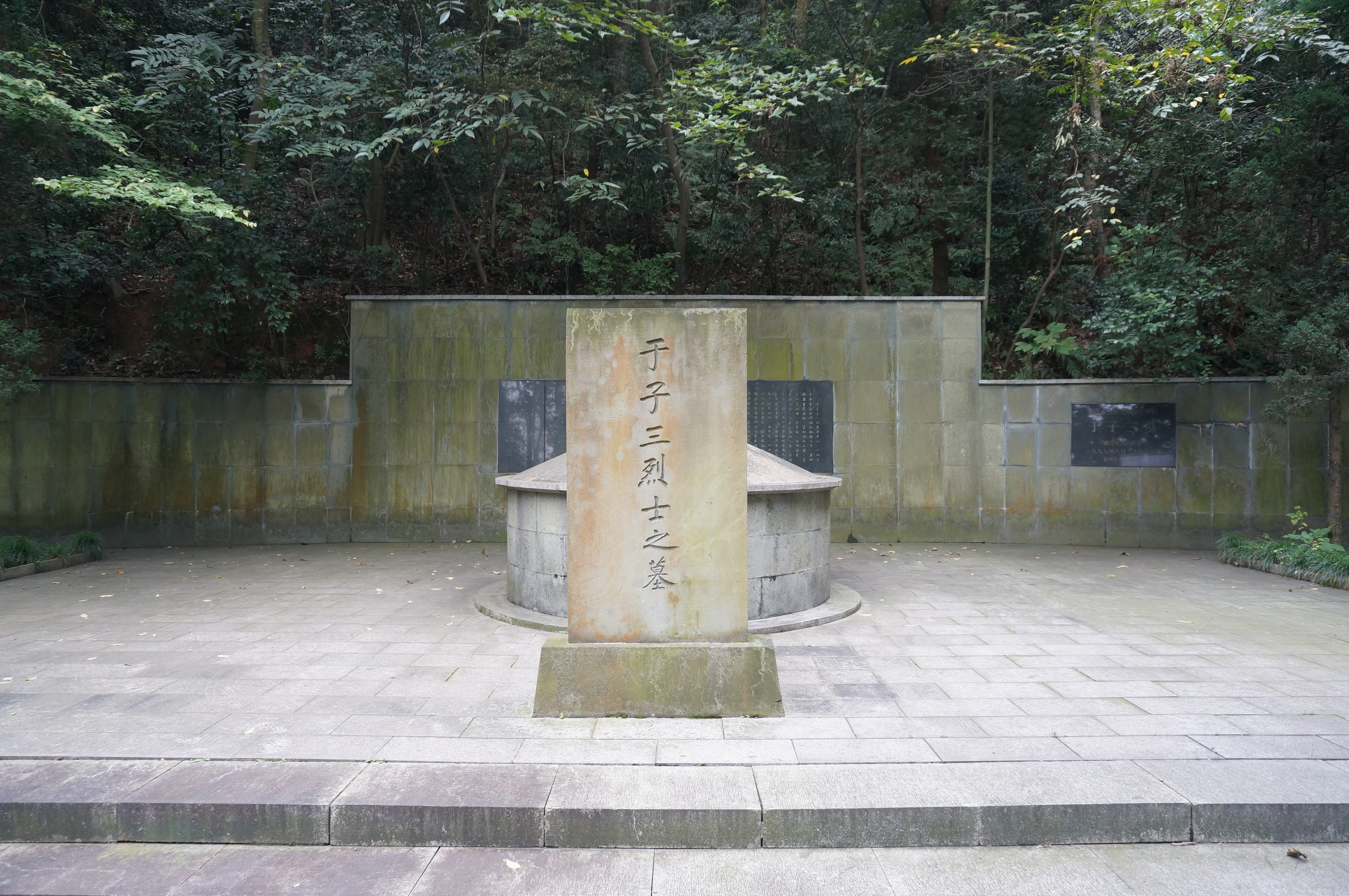
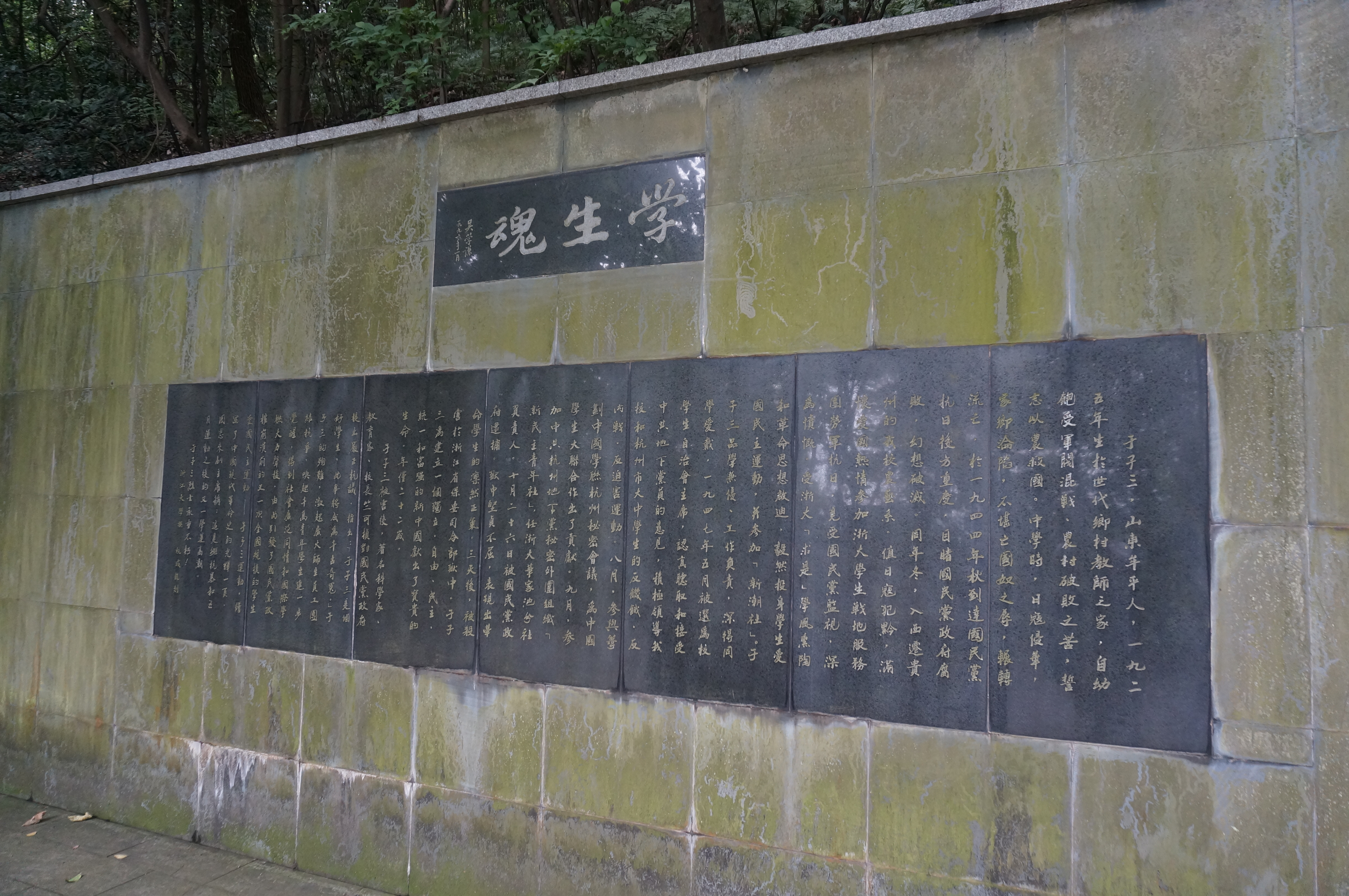
Wu's tomb in Hangzhou, including calligraphy by Wu Xueqian.

On 12 December, SAA approached President Chu with a request to bury Yu next to the Huajiachi campus, which Chu declined. By 21 December, the SAA compromised, asking for permission for all its members to attend Yu's funeral. Chu consented to discuss this with the provincial government. However, the provincial authorities demanded that Chu expel the protesting students and dissolve the SAA, a proposal Chu also rejected. Governor Shen Honglie was incensed by the SAA's efforts to bury Yu in the university cemetery and their plans for a parade in downtown Hangzhou.

On 4 January 1948, in the absence of support from university authorities, the SAA resolved to proceed with Yu's funeral procession. This decision led to clashes with local porters and workers, who had been adversely affected by the prolonged curfew near the university campuses and feared that escalating student activism might exacerbate their plight. Finally, on 14 March 1948, the university administration petitioned the local court to bury Yu's body. Following negotiations with Chu, which stipulated no parade or rally and limited attendees transported by three trucks, Yu's body was interred in the university cemetery at Phoenix Mountain, under restrained circumstances.

== Aftermath ==
President Chu was not in favor of student activism. During a faculty meeting, he expressed his sentiments, stating, "I feel sympathy for Yu's tragic death, but I did not appreciate his political activism. A student on campus should have their freedom of belief, but no political activity is allowed." The turmoil and events that followed Yu Zisan's death solidified Chu's decision to resign from his role as president. However, his resignation was not accepted by the government. Amid KMT military setbacks, Chu left the campus on 30 April, heading to Shanghai. This move was in response to the KMT's request for him to relocate to Taiwan, which he declined. Later, in July 1949, when CCP planned to invite Chu to resume his role as president at NCKU, he faced opposition from the students blocking his return.

== See also ==
- Outline of the Chinese Civil War
- Outline of the military history of the People's Republic of China
