= Lee Han-shen =

Former President of Taiwan Power Company

- 李漢申

President of Taiwan Power Company
- In office 30 April 2010 – 2 May 2013
- Preceded by: C. Y. Tu
- Succeeded by: Chu Wen-chen

Personal details
- Born: 26 April 1947 (age 78)
- Education: Tamkang University (BS, PhD)

Lee Han-shen (traditional Chinese: 李漢申; simplified Chinese: 李汉申; pinyin: Lǐ Hànshēn; born 26 April 1947) was the President of Taiwan Power Company (Taipower), the state-owned electric power utility of Taiwan, from 2010 to 2013. He was appointed to the position on 30 April 2010, when the then-President of Taipower, C. Y. Tu, resigned.

== Education ==
Lee graduated from Tamkang University with a Bachelor of Science (B.S.) and a Ph.D.

== Taipower presidency ==
=== Presidency appointment ===
Lee was promoted as the President of Taipower on 30 April 2010 after then-President C. Y. Tu resigned from his position.

=== Lungmen Nuclear Power Plant ===
On 26 March 2012, Lee said that Taiwan's 4th nuclear power plant will begin its operation in 2014. Over 96 percent of its construction has been completed, with the remaining work to involve software and safety improvement projects due to Fukushima Daiichi nuclear disaster a year before in Japan.

=== Taipower presidency retirement ===
On 3 May 2013, Lee handed over his presidential post to Chu Wen-chen as his successor due to his retirement of Taipower President, witnessed by Deputy Minister of Economic Affairs Francis Liang.
