= Wu Cheng-wen (biochemist) =

Taiwanese biochemist (born 1938)

- 吳成文
- Born: 19 June 1938 (age 88); Taihoku, Taiwan, Empire of Japan
- Education: National Taiwan University (MD); Case Western Reserve University (PhD)

Wu Cheng-wen (Chinese: 吳成文; pinyin: Wú Chéngwén; born 19 June 1938) is a Taiwanese biochemist. He is the founding president of National Health Research Institutes, serving from 1996 to 2005.

Wu was elected as an academician of Taiwan's Academia Sinica in 1984. He is a 1988 Guggenheim fellow, as well as a 2011 recipient of the Presidential Science Prize in Life Sciences.

Wu was the director of Academia Sinica's Institute of Biomedical Sciences, and served on the Council of the Academia Sinica. He was a professor of pharmacological sciences at Stony Brook University, and lived in Setauket, New York. Currently he works as a special lecturer at National Yang-Ming University.
