= Zhengtai Campaign =

- Part of the Chinese Civil War
Date	April 8, 1947 – May 4, 1947
Location	Hebei and Shanxi, China
Result	Communist victory

Belligerents
Flag of the National Revolutionary Army National Revolutionary Army	PLA People's Liberation Army

Commanders and leaders
Yan Xishan	(China) Nie Rongzhen

Strength
100,000	100,000

Casualties and losses
35,000	?

The Zhengtai Campaign (正太战役) was a series of battles fought between the nationalists and the communists during the Chinese Civil War in the post World War II era, and resulted in a communist victory.

== Strategies ==
After the Campaign to the South of Baoding, nationalist redeployed their forces totaling 26 divisions in 9 armies. The nationalist forces in North China concentrated on protecting important regions including: the Beijing – Shijiazhuang section of the Beijing – Hankou Railway, the Beijing – Zhangjiakou section of Beijing – Suiyuan Railway, the Northern section of the Datong – Fengling Crossing Railway, Beijing – Shanhaiguan section of Beijing – Shenyang Railway, and the iron triangular region of Beijing – Baoding – Tianjin region.

However, the nationalist strategy was seriously flawed in that in order to strengthen the northern defense in the regions mentioned above, it sacrificed the southern defense: the vast region along Zhengding – Taiyuan Railway in the south were only guarded by three divisions and local militia garrisons, and this flaw was to be exploited to the maximum by the Communists. The commander-in-chief and political commissar of the communist Shanxi – Chahar – Hebei Military Region, Nie Rongzhen, decided to concentrate his force to first clear the nationalists from their strongholds outside Shijiazhuang, and then annihilate any nationalist reinforcement sent along the Zhengding – Taiyuan Railway.

== Order of battle ==
Nationalist order of battle: 15 divisions totaling 100,000 troops, commanded by Yan Xishan, including those from:

- 33rd Army
  - 46th Division
- (Independent) 8th Division
- (Independent) 10th Division
- Other divisions
- Local garrisons

Communists order of battle: 100,000 troops commanded by Nie Rongzhen, including those from:

- 2nd Column of the Shanxi – Chahar – Hebei Military Region
- 3rd Column of the Shanxi – Chahar – Hebei Military Region
- 4th Column of the Shanxi – Chahar – Hebei Military Region
- Independent 7th Brigade of the Central Hebei Military Sub-region
- Units of Hebei – Shanxi Military Sub-region
- Units of the 10th Military Sub-district

== Campaign ==
On 8 April 1947, communists begun their 1st stage offensive by attacking nationalist strongholds outside Shijiazhuang in a pincer movement. The outnumbered nationalist garrisons had no choice but to abandon over 90 strongholds and quickly withdrew into the major cities. By 12 April 1947, all nationalist strongholds fell into the communist hands and in addition, two major counties, Zhengding and Luancheng, also fell into the enemy. However, the rapid nationalist retreat had prevented the major loss of troops: only two nationalist regiments were lost during the first stage.

On 14 April 1947, communist forces launched their second-stage offensive by taking Niangzi (娘子) Pass and Jingin (井陉). Important nationalist strongholds to the north of Yangquan including White Earth Slope (Baitupo, 白土坡), Upper Yinying (Shangyinying 上荫莹), and Lower Yinying (Xiayinying, 下荫莹) subsequently fell in a domino effect. After losing nearly four dozen local strongholds, Pingding County and Yangquan were both seriously threatened by the communists, who besieged the last two remaining nationalist strongholds on 25 April 1947. On 24 April 1947, Yan Xishan ordered the nationalist 33rd Army stationed in Taiyuan and Qi (祁) County eastward to reinforce the local nationalist garrison via railway, and reached Yangquan the next day. The defense of Yangquan was further enhanced by the arrival of the nationalist 8th and 10th Division on 28 April 1947. In response, the communists redeployed part of their force to the west to surround the nationalists by taking regions including Qinquan (芹泉), Yu (盂) County, and Ceshiyi (测石驿), thus completely sealing off the retreating routes of the nationalist reinforcement. On 29 April 1947, the main force of the nationalist 33rd Army retreated westward, but they were stopped by the communist forces at the Ceshiyi (测石驿) region.

Meanwhile, on the northern bank of Great Clearity River (Da Qin He 大清河) in Shengfang (胜芳) region, the Independent 7th Brigade of communist Central Hebei Military District and local garrison of the communist 10th Military Sub-district successfully beat back repeated attacks of the nationalist reinforcement. However, the communist victory was largely due to the lack of cooperation among nationalists themselves: out of a total of seven divisions, only 13 regiments actually participated in the assaults on the communist positions, less than half of the total. The reason was that Yan Xishan, the nationalist commander-in-chief and the warlord of Shanxi (Shanxi clique), was not willing to sacrifice his own troops for Chiang Kai-shek and other warlords allied with Chiang, which resulted in further disasters for the nationalists: after beating back the nationalist attacks, the Independent 7th Brigade of communist Central Hebei Military Sub-region and local garrison of the communist 10th Military Sub-district further expanded their victories by taken nationalist strongholds including Tang'erli (堂二里) township of Ba (霸) County, Anci (安次) county, and the region of Xushengkou (徐胜口) on 27 April 1947.

By 1 May 1947, it was obvious to the nationalists that Yangquan could not be held any longer. Yan Xishan ordered most of the defenders, including the 46th Division of the 33rd Army and the Independent 10th Division to retreat westward, while the 5th Group, consisted of 500 former Japanese troops enlisted in Yan's army were ordered to stay behind to guard Lion Brain Mountain (Shi Nao Shan, 狮脑山) to cover the general retreat. However, the retreating nationalist main force met stubborn enemy resistance and was stopped surrounded by the enemy at the regions of Zhaiyu (寨鱼) and Ceshiyi (测石驿). On 3 May 1947, under the communist's overwhelming political offensive, the 500 member strong nationalist 5th Group surrendered to the communists. On 4 May 1947, nationalist defenders at Zhaiyu (寨鱼) and Ceshiyi (测石驿) region could no longer hold out and attempted to breakout, but they were ambushed on their retreat and most were killed. On the same day, nationalist defenders at Shouyang (寿阳) abandoned their posts under communist's overwhelming pressure and fled to Yuci. The communists did not end the campaign until they chased the retreating nationalist force all the way to the suburb of Yuci.

== Outcome ==
The internal power struggle and the lack of cooperation contributed to the nationalist defeat at least as much as the enemy pressure if not greater. Yan Xishan, the nationalist commander-in-chief and the warlord of Shanxi was not willing to sacrifice his own troops to help Fu Zuoyi, the nationalist commander and warlord who controlled Hebei. The personal relationship between the two nationalist commanders were strained due to history: prior to the Second Sino-Japanese War, Fu Zuoyi was originally a trusted officer of Yan Xishan but later defected from Yan's clique in the wars among warlords, and eventually became a rival of Yan. Although both came under Chiang Kai-shek's nationalist government's rule after World War II, the distrust among the two still ran deep. As a more capable commander, Fu Zuoyi was not happy to see the overall command was given to Yan Xishan, who, in turn, was not willing to make a full commitment to fight communists outside his own turf for somebody else, especially somebody who betrayed him before, so the cooperation between the two was half-hearted at best. The result was that, although an impressive force totaling more than 100,000 with technical superiority was deployed, they were not concentrated in offensives against communist forces and thus was not effective at all in thwarting the enemy's advance, which inevitably led to the loss of more than a third of troops deployed in the campaign, as well as territories, and initiatives on the battlefield.

For the communists, their victory included taking seven cities / town, three important mineral rich regions including Huangdangou (黄丹沟), Jingin (井陉) and Yangquan. A vast region along the 180 km stretch railway from Huolu (获鹿) to Yuci had fallen under Reds' control, and Shijiazhuang, the provincial capital of Hebei was isolated. The Zhengtai Campaign proved to be pivotal for Reds because it turned the tide in North China: after the defeat, the nationalists were forced to be on the defensive and were never able to launch large offensives against the communists like they used to do, and a stalemate was reached. The initiatives changed hands to the communist side, which changed their defensive posture to an offensive posture by gradually stepped up their own offensives against the nationalists as time goes by.

== See also ==
- Outline of the Chinese Civil War
- National Revolutionary Army
- History of the People's Liberation Army
