= Seizō Kobayashi =

Imperial Japanese commander

Junior Second Rank Admiral Seizō Kobayashi
- 小林 躋造
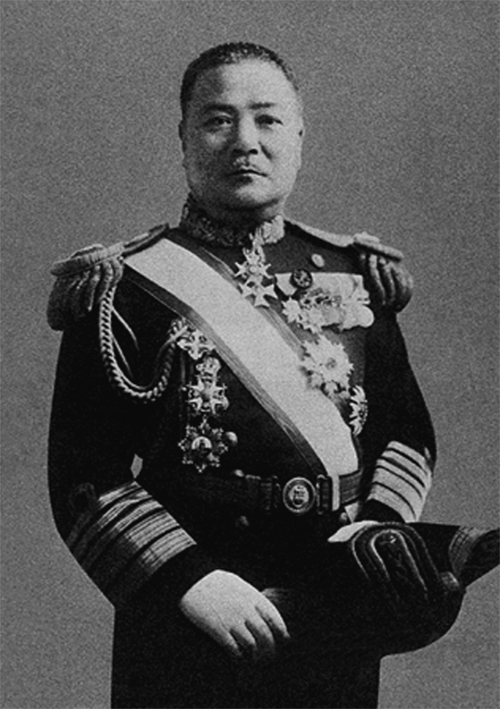

17th Governor-General of Taiwan
- In office 2 September 1936 – 27 November 1940
- Monarch: Shōwa
- Preceded by: Nakagawa Kenzō
- Succeeded by: Kiyoshi Hasegawa

Member of the House of Peers
- In office 26 August 1944 – 22 February 1946 Nominated by the Emperor

Personal details
- Born: 1 October 1877 Minami-ku, Hiroshima, Japan
- Died: 4 July 1962 (aged 84) Setagaya, Tokyo, Japan
- Resting place: Tama Cemetery
- Party: Imperial Rule Assistance Association
- Awards: Grand Cordon of the Order of the Rising Sun; Grand Cordon of the Order of the Sacred Treasure

Military service
- Allegiance: Empire of Japan
- Branch/service: Imperial Japanese Navy
- Years of service: 1898–1936
- Rank: Admiral
- Commands: Hirado
- Battles/wars: Russo-Japanese War; World War I

Admiral Seizō Kobayashi (Japanese: 小林 躋造, Hepburn: Kobayashi Seizō; 1 October 1877 – 4 July 1962) was a Japanese naval commander, commander of the Combined Fleet of the Imperial Japanese Navy (1931–1933) and the 17th Governor-General of Taiwan (1936–1940).

== Early life and career ==
Kobayashi was born in 1877 in Hiroshima and pursued a naval career. After graduating from the Imperial Naval Academy with honors, in 1898 Kobayashi first served as an ensign on the corvette Hiei and by 1900 was promoted as a second lieutenant on the battleship Hatsuse. In the years 1902–1905 he was an artillery officer in the cruiser Naniwa and in 1912 was seconded to serve as an officer on HMS Collingwood. In 1917 he was promoted to commander and took command of the cruiser Hirado. In 1920, Kobayashi was appointed naval attaché to the Imperial Japanese Embassy in London, and was appointed to the rank of rear admiral in 1922. In 1928, by now a vice admiral, Kobayashi commanded a naval squadron on board Izumo that visited Sydney Harbour, being the fourth time he had visited Sydney, and was received by the Governor of NSW, Sir Dudley de Chair, with whom he had served on HMS Collingwood.

During the First World War, Kobayashi was awarded the US Navy Cross, for his actions in support of the Allied fleet, and with the end of the war he served on the committee tasked with the disposal of enemy naval vessels and was Japan's chief naval expert at the 1927 Geneva Naval Conference tasked with arms limitations. In June 1930, he was appointed Deputy Minister of Navy and in December 1931 was appointed as the Commander of the Combined Fleet of the Imperial Japanese Navy. His promotion to Admiral was confirmed on 1 March 1933. In March 1936, in the aftermath of the February 26 Incident, Kobayashi was transferred to the Naval reserve and was appointed as Governor-General of Taiwan on 2 September 1936.

== Governor-General of Taiwan ==
As the first military governor after a long period of the rule of civilian governors, Koobayashi followed a policy of "Japanization", believing that the colonial status should be abolished in favour of removing the distinction between the Taiwanese and the Japanese on the island and making the territory a fundamental part of the Japan homeland. As Governor-General, in April 1937 Kobayashi ordered the banning of all the Chinese-language media in the colony, with the supremacy of the Japanese language being confirmed, a policy that was soon followed in the colony's schools. This policy was termed kōminka undō (皇民化運動), which roughly meant a "campaign to transform [the conquered people] into the subjects of the emperor". This new aggressive colonial policy also necessitated the imposition of State Shinto and bans on traditional Chinese festivals and customs.

== Later life and career ==
Kobayashi resigned from the post of governor in 1940. During the Pacific War, Kobayashi was a considered as candidate for Prime Minister to replace Hideki Tojo and seek peace with the allies by a group surrounding Shigeru Yoshida and Fumimaro Konoe. However, Konoe wavered and did not nominate Kobayashi after Tojo resigned and the choice instead fell on Kuniaki Koiso.

Under Koiso, Kobayashi was appointed to the House of Peers and elected president of the Imperial Rule Assistance Political Association. In December 1944 he was also made Minister of State in the Koiso Cabinet. Kobayashi oversaw the dissolution of the IRAPA in March 1945 and resigned from cabinet. In February 1946, he stepped down from the House of Peers.

Political offices
Preceded by Yamanashi Katsunoshin	Vice-Minister of the Navy; 10 June 1930 - 1 December 1931	Succeeded by Sakonji Seizō
Military offices
Preceded by Yamamoto Eisuke	Combined Fleet & 1st Fleet; Commander-in-chief; 1 December 1931– 15 November 1933	Succeeded by Suetsugu Nobumasa
Government offices
Preceded by Nakagawa Kenzō	Governor-General of Taiwan; 2 September 1936 – 27 November 1940	Succeeded by Hasegawa Kiyoshi
