= 1947 in China =

- Decades: 1920s; 1930s; 1940s; 1950s; 1960s
- See also: Other events of 1947; History of China • Timeline • Years

This is a list of events in the year 1947 in the Republic of China. This year is numbered Minguo 36 according to the official Republic of China calendar.

== Incumbents ==
- President – Chiang Kai-shek
- Vice President – Li Zongren
- Premier – T. V. Soong, Chiang Kai-shek (acting), Zhang Qun
- Vice Premier – Weng Wenhao, Wang Yunwu

== Events ==
=== January ===
- 7 January – The establishment of Tainan County in Taiwan
- 21–28 January – Campaign to the South of Baoding

=== February ===
- 28 February – Start of February 28 Incident in Taiwan

=== April ===
- 8–30 April – Zhengtai Campaign

=== March ===
- 19 March – Battle of Yan'an

=== May ===
- 1–4 May – Zhengtai Campaign.
- 13–16 May – Menglianggu Campaign
- May 13 – July 1 – Summer Offensive of 1947 in Northeast China
- June 25 – July 6 – Campaign to the North of Baoding

=== July ===
- 29 July - 1947 Assam earthquake

=== August ===
- 13–18 August – Meridian Ridge Campaign
- September 14 – November 5 – Autumn Offensive of 1947 in Northeast China
- October 29 – November 25 – Campaign in the Eastern Foothills of the Funiu Mountains

=== October ===
- Yu Zisan Incident

=== December ===
- 7–9 December – Battle of Phoenix Peak
- 25 December – The Constitution of the Republic of China went into effect.

== Births ==
- 14 April – Chou Kung-shin, Director of National Palace Museum (2008–2012)
- 26 April – Lee Han-shen, President of Taiwan Power Company (2010–2013)
- 5 July – Lin Chun-te, member of Legislative Yuan (1999–2008)
- 10 September – Tseng Yung-chuan, Secretary-General of the Presidential Office (2012, 2015–2016)
- 5 November
  - Hsu Tsai-li – Mayor of Keelung City (2001–2007)
  - Yang Chao-hsiang – Minister of Education (1999–2000)
- 16 December – Wu Nai-ren, Secretary-General of Democratic Progressive Party (2000–2002, 2009, 2010)

== Deaths ==
- May 16 – Zhang Lingfu, general

== See also ==
- List of Chinese films of the 1940s
