= Chang Li-sheng =

Chinese politician and diplomat

- 張厲生
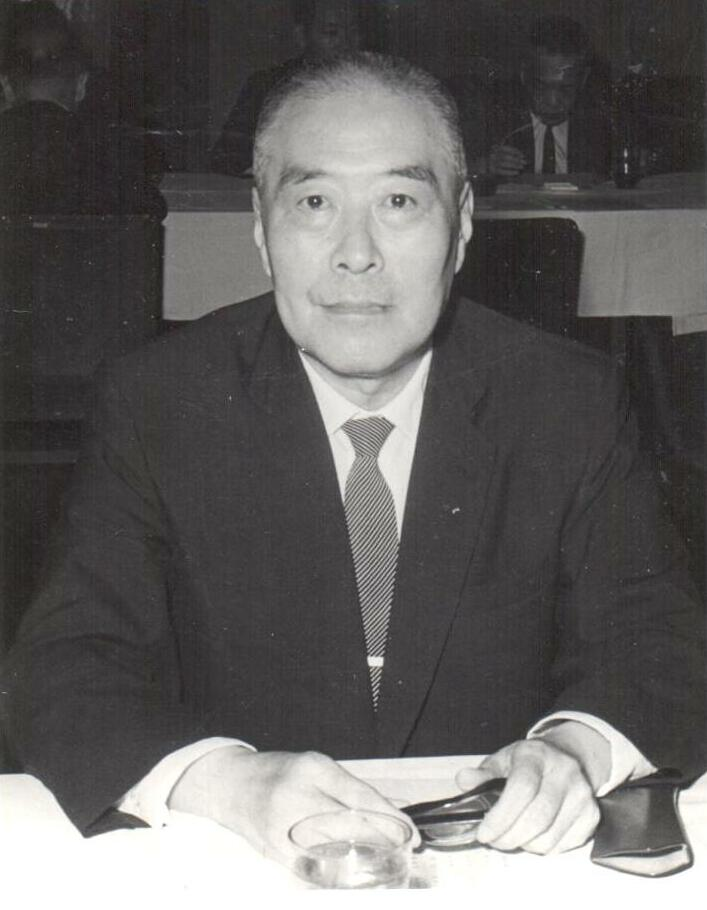

Vice Premier of the Republic of China
- In office 12 March 1950 – 1 June 1954
- Premier: Chen Cheng
- Preceded by: Chu Chia-hua
- Succeeded by: Huang Shao-ku
- In office 22 June 1948 – 23 December 1948
- Premier: Weng Wenhao; Sun Fo
- Preceded by: Ku Meng-yu
- Succeeded by: Wu Tiecheng

Personal details
- Born: 17 June 1901 Laoting, Hebei, Qing Dynasty
- Died: 20 April 1971 (aged 69) Taipei, Taiwan
- Party: Kuomintang
- Education: University of Paris (PhD)

Chang Li-sheng (Chinese: 張厲生; pinyin: Zhāng Lìshēng; 17 June 1901 – 20 April 1971) was a Chinese politician and diplomat who served as the Secretary General of the Kuomintang from 1954 to 1959. L.S. Chang as he was commonly known, played a key role in Republic of China (ROC)'s political, economic, financial, and foreign affairs as well as in Kuomintang affairs from the 1920s until his death in Taiwan in 1971. Throughout his political life over four decades, Chang served in numerous important posts within both the KMT and the ROC's local and central governments. He was a rare example of Chinese political virtues, noted for his integrity and honesty. He is remembered for numerous achievements and deeds, including his role in assisting Chen Cheng (1897–1965), former Taiwan provincial governor, Premier, and Vice President, to launch Taiwan's local autonomy, economic and land reforms.

== Early life and political career ==
Chang was born into a poor family in Leting, Hebei. Having studied in Nankai Middle School in Tianjin and Chaoyang University in Peking with impressive records, Chang was selected and sent to study in France under the work-study program. In 1922, he was enrolled in University of Paris and majored in political science. In Paris, he became associated with Zhou Enlai, who also joined the same work-study program in France and who later tried to enlist Chang to serve under Mao Zedong.

In 1924, Chang returned to China and became a member of the KMT. In 1927, in the midst of Northern Expedition and of the split between the rightists and the leftists within the KMT, Chang served in the Political Department of the 10th Army of the National Revolutionary Army then based in Wuhan and under the influence of the KMT left-wingers. Shortly after Chiang Kai-shek purged the leftists and stood out as the new strongman within the KMT, Chang was sent to North China to handle local party affairs. In 1928, Chiang completed the Northern Expedition and unified China. By this time, Chang had joined the “Central Club” (C.C. Clique) and became a close associate with Chen Lifu and Chen Guofu, leaders of the Clique. In 1929, he served as secretary of the KMT Department of Organization headed by Chen Guofu.

== Political rise ==
In 1931, Chang was elected the first standing member of the KMT central executive committee, marking his rise within the KMT party hierarchy. Between 1932 and 1935, he was in charge of KMT's party affairs in North China. He played a crucial role in bringing together local Chinese military leaders at the moment when the KMT was facing growing Japanese military encroachments. As KMT's special representative in Tianjin and a member of the Hebei Provincial Government, Chang brokered a military pact with several heavyweight North Chinese military leaders, including Song Zheyuan (宋哲元), Qin Dechun (秦德純), Shang Zhen (商震), and Yu Xuezhong (于學忠). This pact assured the military support from the North Chinese regional leaders to the Nanjing-based Nationalist central government under Chiang Kai-shek, who was having difficulties maintaining the Nationalist position in North China. In 1936, Chiang appointed Chang to head the KMT Department of Organization. After the all-out Japanese invasion of China in July 1937, Chang was further appointed to several key positions within the party and the government. It was at the initial stage of the war against Japan that Chang gradually distanced himself from the powerful C.C. Clique and instead began working closely with General Chen Cheng, then Governor of Hubei Province, in launching anti-Communist campaigns in the KMT-controlled areas.

In spring 1944, Chiang Kai-shek asked Chang for a strategy as to how to prepare for the retrocession of Taiwan after the defeat of Japan. In December 1944, Chang was made Minister of Interior. After the Japanese surrendered in August 1945, he became a member of the KMT delegation to participate in the Political Consultative Conference to discuss with the Chinese Communist counterparts about China's postwar reconstruction. In 1948, in the heat of the Chinese civil war, Chang became Vice Premier of the ROC government, burdened with such challenging and difficult tasks as national resources relocations, currency reforms, anti-inflations, and anti-corruptions.

== The Taiwan years ==
In 1949, the KMT was on the losing side of the Chinese Civil War in mainland China and Taiwan became the KMT's last hope. In August, Chang flew to Taiwan to join General Chen Cheng, then the provincial governor, in defending the KMT's last territorial base. In addition to assisting Chen Cheng's land and economic reform programs on the island, Chang also began studying the possible implementation of Taiwan's local autonomy and election. In March 1950, when Chen Cheng became Premier, Chang was made, again, Vice Premier. He served the post until 1954, when Chiang Kai-shek appointed him Secretary-General of the KMT Central Executive Committee. In 1959, Chang was appointed ROC's ambassador to Japan. During Chang's tenure, however, Taiwan's relations with Japan declined considerably. Japan Prime Minister Hayato Ikeda was determined to improve Tokyo's relations with the People's Republic of China (PRC). He became the first Japanese Prime Minister in post-World War II to support and approve of a direct commercial relation between Japan and the PRC. He openly disagreed with Chiang Kai-shek's national policy of the military recovery of mainland China, calling it unrealistic and illusory. In late 1963, when a member of the PRC delegation of mechanists named Zhou Hongqing sought political asylum in Tokyo, the Ikeda Hayato administration insisted on repatriating Zhou to China regardless of diplomatic pressure from Taiwan. When Japanese Minister of Economy Tanzan Ishibashi broke his promise about Japan not entering into industrial relations with the PRC which he had given ambassador Chang the day before at a dinner which Chang had given at the ROC embassy, Chang said, "When there is no longer trust between countries, then there is no need for me to remain in Japan." He packed and left the embassy and returned to Taiwan in 1964.

Chang Li-sheng's belief in straight living gave him difficult years before he died from lung malfunctioning in April 1971. He refused government funds for special care after retiring from official post. Chang was born into a poor family. By the time of his death, Chang remained a relatively poor man; his dentist friend brought him an electric heater to make his last days somewhat more comfortable. He left his wife and eight children and an impeccable reputation as one of China's outstanding statesmen.
