= Weng Wenhao =

Chinese geologist and politician (1889–1971)

- 翁文灏
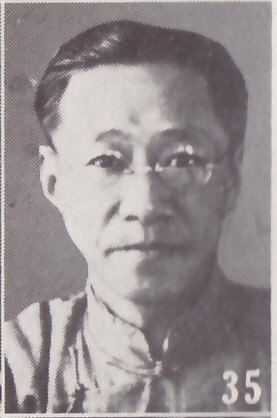
- Weng Wenhao as pictured in The Most Recent Biographies of Chinese Dignitaries

Premier of China
- In office 25 May 1948 – 26 November 1948
- President: Chiang Kai-shek
- Preceded by: Chang Chun
- Succeeded by: Sun Fo

Vice Premier of China
- In office 4 June 1945 – 18 April 1947
- Premier: Soong Tse-ven; Chiang Kai-shek (acting)
- Preceded by: Kung Hsiang-hsi
- Succeeded by: Wang Yunwu

Personal details
- Born: 26 July 1889 Ningbo, Zhejiang, Qing dynasty
- Died: 27 January 1971 (aged 81) Beijing, China
- Party: Kuomintang
- Education: Catholic University of Leuven (PhD)

Weng Wenhao (simplified Chinese: 翁文灏; traditional Chinese: 翁文灝; pinyin: Wēng Wénhào; 26 July 1889 – 27 January 1971), courtesy name Yongni (咏霓), was a Chinese geologist and politician. One of the earliest modern Chinese geologists, he is regarded as the founder of modern Chinese geology and the father of modern Chinese oil industry. From May to November 1948, Weng served as President of the Executive Yuan (Premier) of the Republic of China.

== Life ==
=== Early years ===
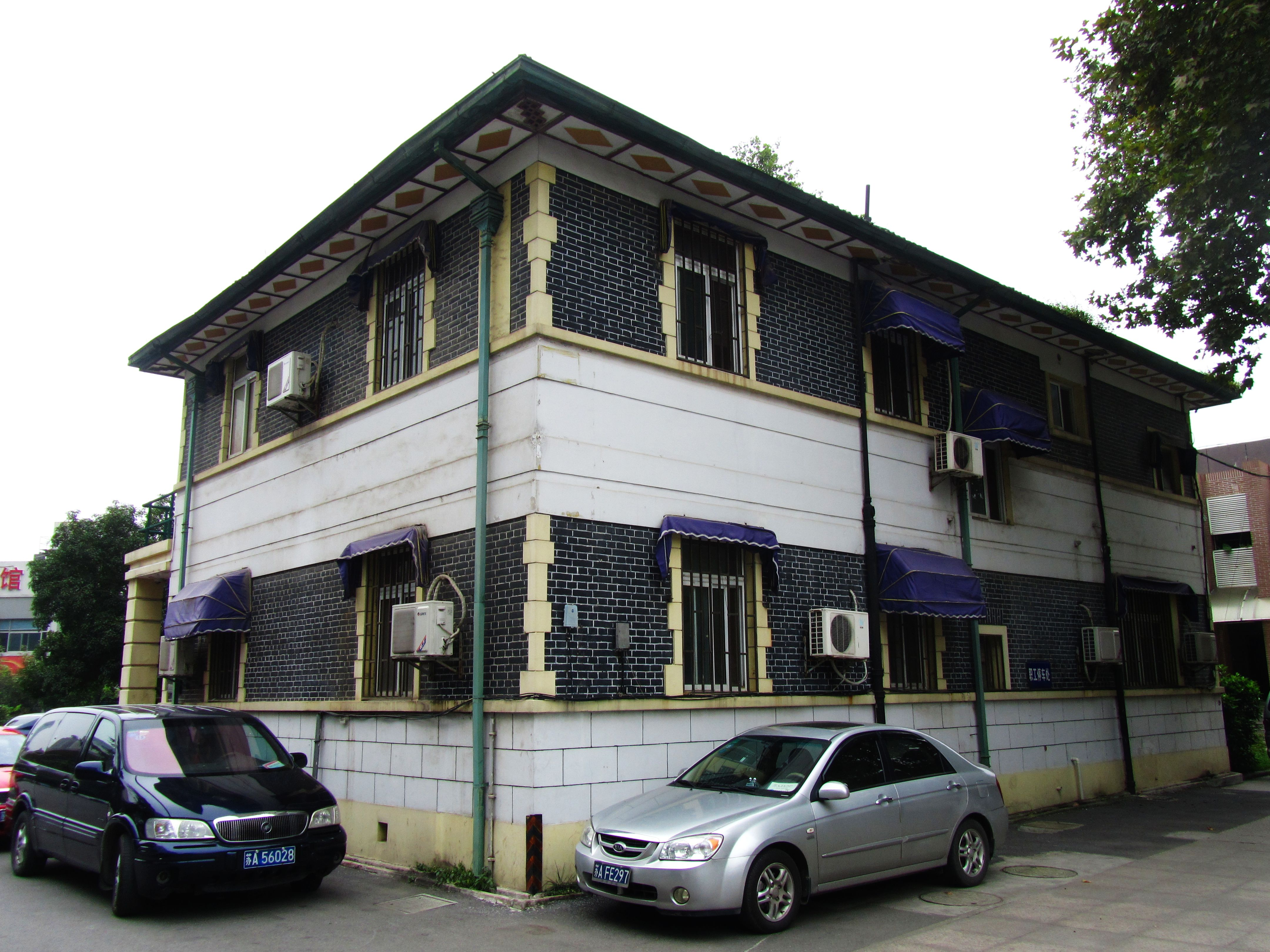
Former residence of Weng Wenhao in Nanjing.

He was born in 1889 in Cixi, Zhejiang in late Qing dynasty. His father was a local businessman.

In 1902, he earned the xiucai degree in the Imperial Examination at the age of only 13 He later studied at a French Catholic school in Shanghai. He earned his doctorate in geology from the Catholic University of Leuven in Belgium in 1912. He was the first Chinese person to hold a doctoral degree in geology from a Western university.

=== ROC period ===
After returning to China in 1912, Weng served as Minister of Mine Industry and Minister of Agriculture and Commerce, in the Beiyang Government. He was a professor (and director from 1914) of the National Research Institute of Geography. Together with Ding Wenjiang, he founded the new National Geological Survey.

He was also a professor of geology in both Beijing University and Tsinghua University. He once was the head of the Department of Geography, Tsinghua University. In July 1931, he was appointed acting president of Tsinghua University.

In 1928, he assisted Canadian paleoanthropologist Davidson Black in the establishment of the Cenozoic Research Laboratory for the research and appraisal of Peking Man fossils unearthed at Zhoukoudian.

He led the National Defense Planning Commission, which was created in 1932 for industrial mobilization as a response to Japan's 1931 invasion of Manchuria. During his tenure, the Commission (renamed the National Resources Commission in 1935) gained control over most heavy industry enterprises in areas of China controlled by the Nationalist government.

During the period of Central (Provisional) Military Government of the Republic of China, he served in the central government as the General Secretary of the Executive Yuan (13 December 1935 – 9 September 1937); the Minister of Industry (until 1 January 1938), Minister of Education (28 October 1932 – 21 April 1933), and the Minister of Economy (1 January 1938 – 1947).

Weng also served as the chairman of the state-owned enterprise China Textile Construction Company.

Invited by Chiang Kai-shek, he served as the first president of the Executive Yuan of Nationalist Government (capital Nanjing) (25 May 1948 – 26 November 1948).

In March 1948, he was elected a founding member of Academia Sinica.

=== People's Republic of China ===
After the Chinese Civil War, he moved to Beijing and served in the Chinese People's Political Consultative Conference (CPPCC) with his longtime associate Qian Changzhao.

During the Cultural Revolution, he was specially protected by Zhou Enlai. In 1971, he died in Beijing.

== Views ==
In 1941, Weng advocated a "planned and controlled economic system" in which "the government shall take major responsibility for making national defense its top priority, by promoting [state-owned enterprises] to ensure the creation of a solid foundation, and by controlling private enterprise to ensure its healthy development."

In a 1943 article, Weng wrote that the Japanese-operated enterprises in the puppet state of Manchukuo would be crucial to China's recovery from the Second Sino-Japanese War.

Weng viewed the establishment of state-owned enterprises as important to the task of nation-building. In a 1946 speech, he stated, "The master of the state enterprises is the state and all citizens. Therefore, those who work for state enterprises must be loyal to the state and work hard for the nation. They cannot pursue any individual interests."

== Family ==
He had four sons, the eldest one named Weng Xinyuan (翁心源), was a famous petroleum engineer who was killed in the Cultural Revolution, the second oldest one named Weng Xinhan (翁心翰) was a Chinese Air Force pilot, and veteran of the Battle of Sichuan, who was killed later in the Second Sino-Japanese War/WWII.

The founder of Chinese modern geophysics - Weng Wenbo (翁文波), an academician of the Chinese Academy of Sciences, is his cousin.

Weng Xinzhi (翁心植), academician of Chinese Academy of Engineering, is his nephew.

== Academic achievements & activities ==
- One of the founders of modern Chinese geography;
- Set up modern Chinese oil industry;
- Studies of the Peking Man;
- Studies of earthquake in China.

== Major works ==
- Studies of Earthquakes in Gansu Procince (《甘肃地震考》)
- A Brief Record of Minerals in China (《中国矿产志略》)
- Literary Collection of Zhuizhi (《椎指集》)
- Mourn for Mr. Ding Zai-Jun (《追悼丁在君先生》)
- Earthquake (《地震》)
- Quadrumana Fossils in China (《中国灵长类动物化石》)
- The First Record on Chinese Mine Industry (《第一次中国矿业纪要》)
- Paleozoic Plant Fossils in the Middle Part of Shanxi Province (《山西中部古生代植物化石》)
- An Elementary Introduction to Earthquake (《地震浅说》)
- Lectures on Geology (《地质学讲义》)

Political offices
Preceded by Chang Chun	Premier of China; 1948	Succeeded by Sun Fo
