= Kiyoshi Hasegawa (admiral) =

Japanese admiral (1883–1970)

Senior Third Rank Kiyoshi Hasegawa
- 長谷川 清
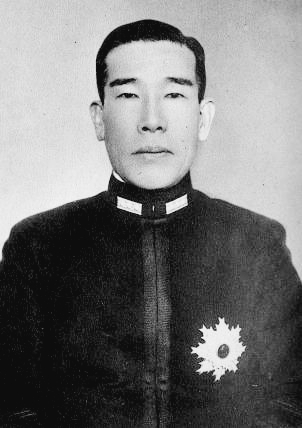
- Hasegawa c. 1940

18th Governor General of Taiwan
- In office 27 November 1940 – 30 December 1944
- Monarch: Shōwa
- Preceded by: Seizō Kobayashi
- Succeeded by: Rikichi Andō

Personal details
- Born: 7 May 1883 Asuwa, Fukui, Japan
- Died: 2 September 1970 (aged 87) Jiyūgaoka, Tokyo, Japan
- Party: Imperial Subject Public Service Association (Taiwan)
- Awards: Order of the Golden Kite, 1st Class; Grand Cordon of the Order of the Rising Sun; Grand Cordon of the Order of the Sacred Treasure

Military service
- Allegiance: Empire of Japan
- Branch/service: Imperial Japanese Navy
- Years of service: 1903–1945
- Rank: Admiral
- Commands: 10th Torpedo Unit, Mikazuki, Nisshin, Nagato, 2nd Submarine Squadron, Kure Naval Arsenal, 3rd Fleet, China Area Fleet, Yokosuka Naval District
- Battles/wars: Russo-Japanese War; Battle of the Yellow Sea (WIA); Battle of Tsushima; World War I; Siege of Tsingtao; World War II; Pacific War

Admiral Kiyoshi Hasegawa (長谷川 清, Hasegawa Kiyoshi; 7 May 1883 – 2 September 1970) was an admiral in the Imperial Japanese Navy and the 18th Governor-General of Taiwan during most of the Pacific War, serving from December 1940 to December 1944.

== Early life and naval career ==
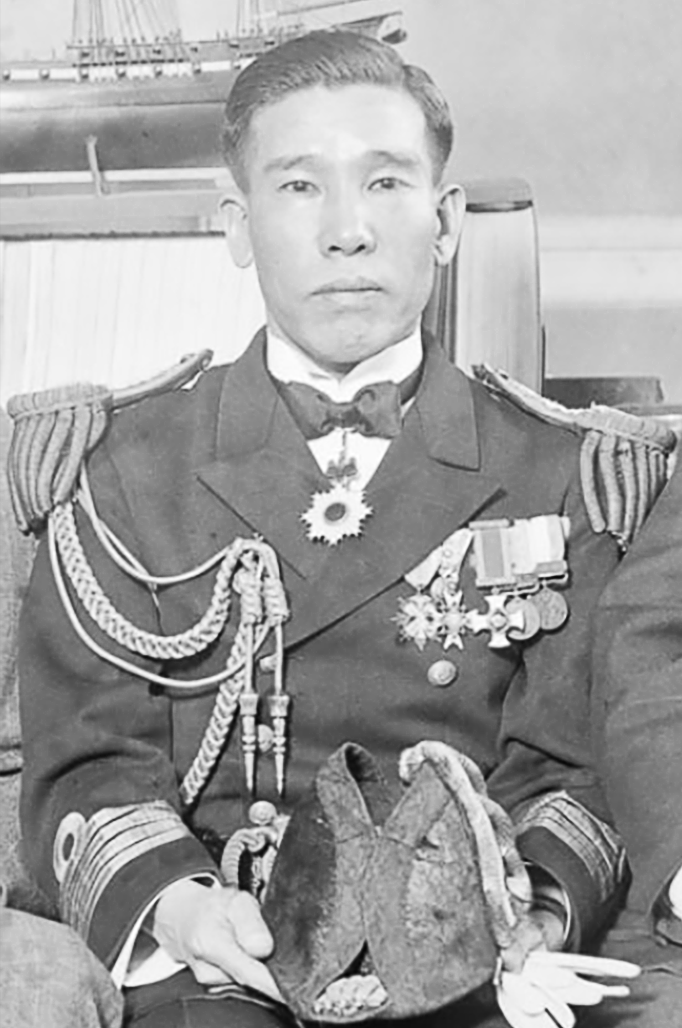
Captain Kiyoshi Hasegawa, Feb. 17, 1926

The second son of a doctor, Hasegawa was born in the village of Yashiro in the district of Asuwa, Fukui Prefecture, now incorporated into the city of Fukui. Having aspirations to join the Navy from an early age, in 1900 he graduated from high school and enrolled at the Imperial Japanese Naval Academy on 17 December. He graduated as a midshipman on 14 December 1903, ranking sixth in his class of 173, and joined the crew of the cruiser Matsushima. He transferred to the battleship Yashima on 4 January 1904. As Hasegawa had graduated on the eve of the Russo-Japanese War, his class did not make the usual long-distance navigational training voyages, which only resumed after the conflict. On 23 May, Hasegawa was transferred to the battleship Mikasa. He received minor wounds at the Battle of the Yellow Sea on 10 August, and was commissioned an ensign on 10 September. Serving at the decisive Battle of Tsushima on 27 May 1905, Hasegawa was promoted to sub-lieutenant on 5 August. He was wounded when the Mikasa exploded and sank at Sasebo on 11 September. He was then assigned to the cruiser Itsukushima and embarked on a training cruise from 15 February 1906, returning to Sasebo on 25 August. He rejoined the Mikasa five days later after her reconstruction had been completed. Hasegawa was assigned to the destroyer Shirotae on 23 February 1907, and was promoted to lieutenant on 25 September 1908.

Hasegawa enrolled at the Naval War College as a Class B student on 25 May 1909, and entered the naval torpedo school on 24 November. Graduating on 23 May 1910, on 25 May he was assigned to the armoured cruiser Asama as a squad leader, and assigned to the Kasagi on 24 June. On 16 October, he embarked on a cruise which took him to Honolulu, San Francisco and Acapulco, returning to Japan on 6 March 1911. Appointed to the staff of the Second Fleet on 11 March, he was appointed an instructor at the Naval War College torpedo school on 1 December. He enrolled at the Naval War College as a Class A student on 1 December 1912, and was promoted to lieutenant-commander on 1 December 1913. He graduated on 27 May 1914, ranking second in his class of 16, and briefly commanded the destroyer Mikazuki before being assigned as the aide to the admiral of the Second Fleet.

During World War I, Hasegawa participated in the Siege of Tsingtao in October 1914. In February 1915, he was assigned to the Personnel Department of the Navy Ministry and on 1 April 1916 was appointed assistant secretary to the Minister of the Navy and future Prime Minister Admiral Katō Tomosaburō. On 1 December 1917, he was assigned as an assistant naval attaché at the Japanese embassy in Washington, D.C., and was promoted to commander a year later. As anti-Japanese and general sentiments against the "yellow peril" remained high, fears of spying prompted embassy officials to ban the use of the Japanese language within the embassy and to only speak in English; however, Hasegawa personally felt the Americans genuinely had decent motives. He became good friends with Yamamoto Isoroku, his successor as naval attaché. Hasegawa was promoted to naval attaché in Washington on 20 March 1919, and returned to Japan the following year, resuming service in the Personnel Department of the Navy Ministry.

On 1 December 1922, Hasegawa was promoted to captain and appointed director of the Personnel Department. He was appointed to the Imperial Japanese Navy General Staff the following 1 November. Though Hasegawa had differences with his superior Admiral Katō, they maintained harmonious relations. Hasegawa was also in favour of allowing all qualified candidates admittance to the Naval Academy and Naval War College, regardless of political affiliation. This cemented his friendship with a fellow captain and future vice-admiral, Terashima Ken (1882 - 1972); they remained friends until Hasegawa's death. Hasegawa was again appointed naval attaché in Washington on 10 November, returning to Japan on 15 April 1926. He was given the command of the coastal defence vessel and former cruiser Nisshin on 1 May, and received the command of the Nagato on 1 December.

Hasegawa was promoted to rear admiral on 1 December 1927 and appointed chief of staff of the Yokosuka Naval District. He was appointed commander of the 2nd Submarine Squadron on 30 November 1929. The following year, he was appointed as chief of the 5th section, Navy Technical Department, and appointed commander of the Kure Naval Arsenal on 1 December 1931. Re-appointed to the Naval General Staff in October 1932, Hasegawa attended the World Disarmament Conference in Geneva from April to October 1933. He was promoted to vice-admiral on 1 December 1933 and became Vice-Minister of the Navy in May 1934.

In December 1936, Hasegawa was given command of a fleet, and was appointed commander of the Third Fleet on 20 October 1937. The Panay Incident took place during his tenure as fleet commander. As Commander-in-Chief of the Third Fleet in China, Hasegawa met several Chinese admirals and generals, who respected Hasegawa for his civil behaviour. He was once again assigned to command the Yokosuka Naval District on 25 April 1938, and was promoted to full admiral on 1 April 1939.

== Governor-General of Taiwan ==
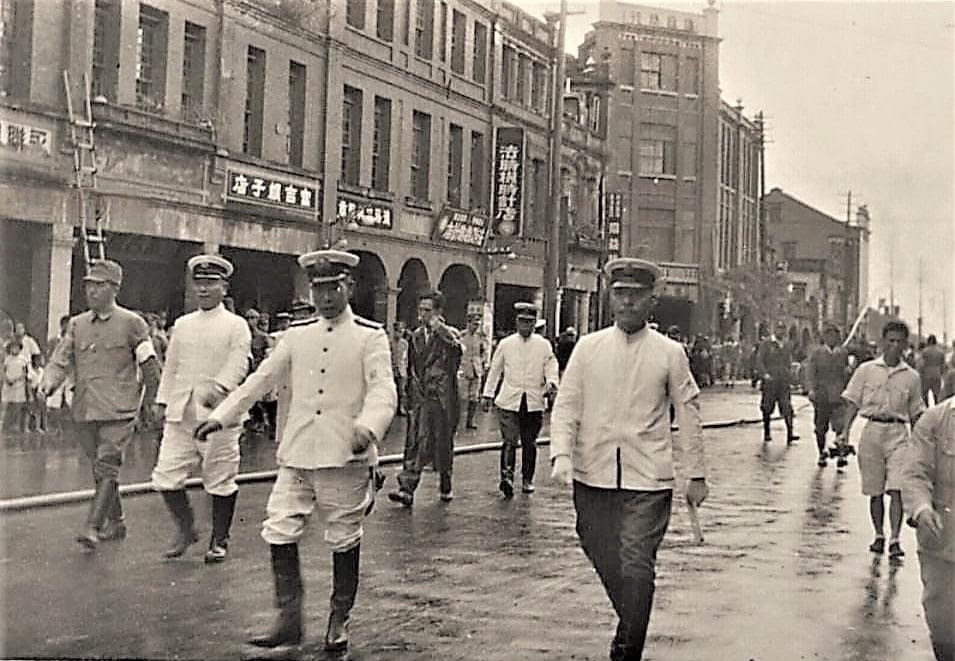
In 1942, Governor Hasegawa inspected air defense drills in Daitōtei, Taihoku City

Hasegawa was appointed a military councillor on 1 May 1940, and appointed the 18th Governor-General of Taiwan on 27 November; though it was customary for Governors-General to be retired military officers, the Naval Minister, Koshirō Oikawa, insisted on Hasegawa's remaining on active service. Hasegawa arrived in Taihoku (now Taipei City) on 16 December. An anecdote is given that at the new Governor-General's official welcoming ceremony; he picked up a maid in a burst of exuberance and sat her on his lap, which astonished many of those present. During Hasegawa's tenure as Governor-General, a preparatory course for Taihoku Imperial University was set up and compulsory education at the elementary level strengthened. He moderated the radical Kominka (Japanization) movement in Taiwan promoted by his predecessor, Seizō Kobayashi, who wanted to replace Taiwanese folk religion by Japanese Shinto. He relinquished his office on 30 December 1944 and returned to Japan.

== Later naval career ==
Hasegawa had been considered as a candidate for Naval Minister in the new cabinet of Suzuki Kantarō; instead, he was appointed inspector-general of the Imperial Navy and headed an office conducting research into advanced naval technologies from 1 June 1945. The office continued to function until the surrender of Japan on 15 August. Along with all other Imperial officers, he entered the reserves on 30 November, after over four decades of service.

== Postwar ==
Along with many other leading politicians and military commanders, Hasegawa was arrested in late 1946 as a suspected Class A war criminal by the American occupation authorities. As he had been commander of naval forces in China at the time of the Panay Incident, he was questioned by GHQ officers. However, Hasegawa made a formal apology to the American and British officers; impressing the court with his integrity, he was acquitted. Following his release from Sugamo Prison on 14 January 1947, in 1951 he sat on an advisory committee composed of former Imperial Japanese Navy officers to oversee the formation of the Japan Maritime Self-Defence Force.

Hasegawa died in Tokyo on the 25th anniversary of the end of the Second World War, aged 87. His grave is at the Kamakura Reien Cemetery.

== Honours ==
- Grand Cordon of the Order of the Sacred Treasure (29 April 1934)
- Grand Cordon of the Order of the Rising Sun (13 August 1938)
- Order of the Golden Kite, 1st Class (4 April 1942)

Military offices
Preceded by Kitamura Eitara	Mikazuki; Commanding Officer; 27 May 1914 – 28 August 1914	Succeeded by Tsugedo Michiji
Preceded by Fukuhara Gorō	Nisshin; Commanding Officer; 1 May 1926 – 1 December 1926	Succeeded by Takahashi Yūzaburō
Preceded by Ozoegawa Masaharu	Nagato; Commanding Officer; 1 December 1926 – 1 December 1927	Succeeded by Matsushita Shigeru
Preceded by Ugawa Wataru	Yokosuka Naval District; Chief-of-staff; 1 December 1927 – 30 November 1929	Succeeded by Uemura Shigeo
Political offices
Preceded by Fujita Hisanori	Vice-Minister of the Navy; 10 May 1934 – 1 December 1936	Succeeded by Yamamoto Isoroku
Military offices
Preceded by Oikawa Koshirō	3rd Fleet; Commander-in-chief; 1 December 1936 – 25 April 1938	Succeeded by Oikawa Koshirō
Fleet created	China Area Fleet; Commander-in-chief; 20 October 1937 – 25 April 1938	Succeeded by Oikawa Koshirō
Preceded by Hyakutake Gengo	Yokosuka Naval District; Commander-in-chief; 25 April 1938 – 1 May 1940	Succeeded by Oikawa Koshirō
Government offices
Preceded by Kobayashi Seizō	Governor-General of Taiwan; 27 November 1940 – 30 December 1944	Succeeded by Andō Rikichi
