= Timeline of Taiwanese history =

This is a timeline of Taiwanese history, comprising important legal and territorial changes and political events in Taiwan and its predecessor states. To read about the background to these events, see History of Taiwan and History of the Republic of China. See also the list of rulers of Taiwan.

== 3rd century ==
Year	Date	Event
230		Two generals of Eastern Wu lead 10,000 expedition troops land on an island known as Yizhou (suspected to be Taiwan or the Ryukyu islands) where most of them die but manage to capture and bring "several thousand" natives back to China

== 7th century ==
Year	Date	Event
607–610		The Sui dynasty sends expeditions to an island known as Liuqiu, which possibly is Taiwan, but could also be the Ryukyu Islands

== 12th century ==
Year	Date	Event
1171		Chinese fishermen settle on the Penghu Islands
1171		The Song dynasty stations officers at the Penghu Islands

== 13th century ==
Year	Date	Event
1271		Chinese people start visiting Taiwan
1292		The Yuan dynasty sends an expedition to Liuqiu, which may or may not be Taiwan
1297		The Yuan dynasty sends another expedition to Liuqiu, which may or may not be Taiwan

== 14th century ==
Year	Date	Event
1349		Wang Dayuan provides the first account of a visit to Taiwan and also notes substantial settlements of Chinese traders and fishermen on the Penghu Islands

== 16th century ==
Year	Date	Event
1525		Some merchants from Fujian are able to speak Formosan languages
1544		Portuguese sailors passing Taiwan record in the ship's log the name Ilha Formosa (Beautiful Island).
1563		Pirate Lin Daoqian retreats to southwestern Taiwan after being chased by Ming naval forces
1563		A walled town is built in Penghu (Pescadores) on the orders of a Ming general
1574	3 November	Pirate Lin Feng lands in southwestern Taiwan only to be attacked by indigenous people
1574	27 December	Lin Feng returns to Taiwan again
1582		Portuguese shipwreck survivors, the first Europeans known to have landed on Taiwan, build a raft after 45 days and return to Macau
1590		Chinese from Fujian start settling in southwestern Taiwan
1592		Japan unsuccessfully seeks sovereignty over Taiwan (Takayamakoku, 高山国 in Japanese, lit. high mountain country).
1593		Ming officials issue ten licenses each year for Chinese junks to trade in northern Taiwan

== 17th century ==
Year	Date	Event
1603		Chinese scholar Chen Di spends some time at the Bay of Tayouan (which Taiwan takes its name from) during a Ming dynasty anti-pirate mission and provides the first significant description of Taiwanese indigenous people
1604		Sino-Dutch conflicts: Dutch envoy Wijbrand van Waerwijck and his army are ordered to occupy Penghu (Pescadores) in order to open trade with China
1609		The Tokugawa Shogunate sends feudal lord Arima Harunobu on an exploratory mission to Taiwan.
1616		Nagasaki official Murayama Tōan leads troops on an unsuccessful invasion of Taiwan
1622	August	The Dutch start building a fort at Penghu (Pescadores)
1623		Chinese population in southwestern Taiwan reaches 1,500
1624	26 August	Sino-Dutch conflicts: Ming forces evict the Dutch from Penghu (Pescadores) and they retreat to Taiwan, settling near the Bay of Tayouan next to a pirate village
1624		There are two Chinese villages in Southwestern Taiwan, on a long thin peninsula on the Bay of Tayouan, and on the mainland in what would become Tainan
1624		Chinese laborers start building the Fort Zeelandia at the Bay of Tayouan for the Dutch
1625		The Dutch clash with 170 Chinese pirates in the Madou and are forced to retreat; later the pirates are driven away
1626	July	The Dutch force the Chinese inhabitants of Taiwan to obtain a permit of residence
1626		Spanish expedition to Formosa: The Spanish arrive at Santissima Trinidad (Keelung) and build a fort
1627		Chinese trade with Spanish Formosa picks up after the Spanish manage to ingratiate themselves with the governor of Fujian by defending him from attacks by the indigenous people
1628		The Dutch sign a trade treaty with Zheng Zhilong
1628		The Spanish establish a settlement at Danshui and build Fort Santo Domingo in an attempt to attract Chinese merchants.
1629	summer	Madou ambushes and kills 35 Dutch soldiers
1630	February	Madou signs a nine-month truce with the Dutch
1631		Spanish Formosa uses sulphur in Taiwan to trade for Chinese goods
1633	7 July	Battle of Liaoluo Bay: Hans Putmans' fleet sails into the harbor of Xiamen and fire on Zheng Zhilong's fleet without warning
1633	22 October	Battle of Liaoluo Bay: Hans Putmans' fleet is defeated by Zheng Zhilong off of Kinmen
1634	October	The Dutch forbid Chinese trade of deerskins to anyone but them
1634	5 November	Dutch forces rout Taccariang's forces
1634		Liu Xiang attacks Fort Zeelandia in retaliation for their refusal to aid him against Zheng Zhilong, but fails
1634		Chinese start planting sugarcane near Fort Provintia
1635	winter	Dutch pacification campaign on Formosa: The Dutch defeat Madou
1636		The Dutch declare a pax hollandica in the plains around the Bay of Tayouan
1636		The Chinese start conducting large scale commercial hunting in Taiwan with assistance from the Dutch East India Company
1637		The Spanish withdraw half their forces from Taiwan
1640		The Dutch force Chinese people in Taiwan to pay a residency tax
1641		The Dutch attempt to oust the Spaniards from Keelung but fail
1642	August	The Dutch oust the Spaniards in Keelung; so ends Spanish Formosa
1642		The Dutch forbid Chinese from settling outside of areas of company control
1645		The Chinese are forbidden from hunting deer in Taiwan
1651		Reports of violence and extortion of the Chinese by the Dutch are reported
1652	7–11 September	Guo Huaiyi rebellion: Chinese farmers rebel against the Dutch and are defeated; considered to be the first Chinese anti-western uprising
1652		Chinese population in Taiwan reaches 20,000 to 25,000
1654	May	Locusts, plague, and earthquakes greatly damage Taiwan
1655	August	Ming loyalist Zheng Chenggong declares sovereignty over Chinese citizens in Taiwan
1656	9 July	An edict from Zheng Chenggong arrives at Fort Zeelandia declaring all Chinese trade of foreign products to be illegal and punishable by death, and Chinese merchants start leaving Taiwan as a result
1660	March	The Dutch receive news of Zheng Chenggong's plans to invade Taiwan
1660		Albrecht Herport notes that even in their depleted state, there are an abundance of deer in Taiwan
1661	21 April	Zheng Chenggong departs from Kinmen Island for Taiwan
1661	30 April	Zheng Chenggong arrives on the shores of Dutch Formosa near Fort Provintia where three Dutch ships attack them, but one sinks, and the other two retreat; two subsequent Dutch attacks are also defeated
1661	1 May	Fort Provintia surrenders to Zheng Chenggong
1661	3 May	Aboriginals around the Bay of Tayouan surrender to Zheng Chenggong
1661	16 September	Fort Zeelandia launches an attack on Zheng Chengong's army and is defeated
1662	1 February	Siege of Fort Zeelandia: Fort Zeelandia surrenders to Zheng Chenggong and the Dutch depart from Taiwan; so ends Dutch Formosa
1662	23 June	Zheng Chenggong dies and is succeeded by Zheng Xi
1662	November	Zheng Jing defeats Zheng Xi and renamed his realm the Kingdom of Dongning
1663	February	Zheng Jing returns to Xiamen
1663	July	Zheng Jing imprisons his brother Zheng Tai, and as a result their relatives surrender to the Qing dynasty
1663	November	The Qing dynasty conquers Xiamen and Kinmen Island
1664	July	The Dutch occupy Keelung
1664	September	Qing commander Shi Lang leads a fleet of warships to invade Taiwan but is turned back by bad weather
1664		Chinese population in Taiwan rises to 50,000
1665	May	Shi Lang attempts to invade Taiwan but his fleet is scattered by a storm
1666	May	Chinese troops attempt to dislodge the Dutch from Keelung but fail
1668		The Dutch abandon Keelung after alienating local indigenous villages
1674		Zheng Jing re-enters Xiamen (Amoy)
1678		Zheng Jing's forces under Liu Guoxuan attempt to conquer Zhangzhou but fail
1680	26 March	Zheng Jing departs from Xiamen
1681	March	Zheng Jing dies and his son Zheng Kezang succeeds him, only to be ousted by Zheng Keshuang
1683	12 July	Battle of Penghu: Qing commander Shi Lang leads an attack on the Zheng fleet near Penghu (Pescadores) but fails
1683	17 July	Battle of Penghu: The Qing fleet returns and defeats the Zheng fleet, occupying Penghu (Pescadores)
1683		The Qing dynasty conquers the Kingdom of Dongning; Zheng Keshuang is given a non-hereditary position in Beijing
1684		Taiwan is made a prefecture of Fujian, governed by a prefect, under which are magistrates of three counties, Zhuluo, Taiwan, and Fengshan
1684		Total population of Taiwan is around 100,000
1684		Shi Lang estimates that half of Taiwan's Chinese population has left for the mainland
1685		Lin Qianguang writes an account of Taiwanese indigenous peoples
1699		Taiwanese indigenous people rebel in northern Taiwan

== 18th century ==
Year	Date	Event
1711		Annual arrivals in Taiwan reach tens of thousands despite official restrictions
1712		The first regulations on a permit system are recorded
1721	19 April	Zhu Yigui and a group of 80 rebels attack a military outpost at Gangshan, south of Tainan, and rob its weapons; Du Junying also rebels
1721	30 April	Zhu Yigui's rebels attack Tainan but fail
1721	1 May	Zhu Yigui takes Tainan and Zhuluo
1721	3 May	Zhu Yigui is declared a king
1721	16 June	Qing forces land near Tainan and defeat Zhu Yigui
1721	10 September	Du Junying surrenders to Qing forces
1722		Due to the Zhu Yigui uprising, Han-indigenous territories are separated via 54 stelae marking the boundaries of the frontier area
1723		Changhua County is created
1728		Tax registers are expanded to Changhua County
1730		Those without property in mainland China or relatives in Taiwan are barred from entering Taiwan
1731		Danshui subprefecture is created
1731		The Dajiaxi (大甲西) indigenouss around Taichung rebel and kill a subprefect
1732		Migrants are allowed to take children and wives to Taiwan
1732		Qing forces suppress the Dajiaxi (大甲西) indigenous rebellion.
1733		Families on the mainland are allowed to move to Taiwan
1734		A total of 47 indigenous schools are created
1737		Marriage between indigenous women and Han Chinese men is prohibited on the grounds that it interfered in indigenous life and was used by settlers as a means to claim indigenous land.
1738		Reclamation of indigenous land is banned
1740		Legal migration to Taiwan is ended
1750		Han-indigenous boundaries are rebuilt
1756		Immigrant population in Taiwan number 600,147
1760		Han-indigenous boundaries are rebuilt
1760		Families are allowed to enter Taiwan again for a brief period
1766		Two indigenous affairs sub-prefects are appointed to manage indigenous affairs
1770		Chinese settlers start moving into Yilan
1777		Immigrant population in Taiwan number 839,800
1782		Chiayi and Changhua prefectures go to war over gambling debts and more than 400 villages are destroyed
1782		Immigrant population in Taiwan number 912,000
1784		Han-indigenous boundaries are rebuilt
1786		Lin Shuangwen rebellion: Ling Shuangwen rebels and takes over Changhua
1786		Individuals whose relatives are already in Taiwan are allowed to emigrate
1787		A settler named Wu Sha tries to claim Kavalan territory in modern Yilan but is repelled
1788		Lin Shuangwen rebellion: The rebels are defeated
1790		Han-indigenous boundaries are rebuilt
1790		Active enforcement of quarantine measures is abandoned and an office for cross-strait travel is set up
1795		Chen Zhouchuan rebellion
1797		Settler Wu Sha receives financial support from the local government to colonize Yilan but fails to register the land due to lack of official recognition

== 19th century ==
Year	Date	Event
1805		Cai Qian rebellion
1809		Pirate Cai Qian is surrounded by the Qing navy and commits suicide.
1810		Due to fear of piracy, the emperor officially recognizes land previously colonized in Yilan as part of administrated territory
1811		Han Chinese population in Taiwan reaches 1,944,000, 70% residing in the south
1812		Northeast Taiwan is taken over by Chinese people
1814		Some settlers fake indigenous land-lease documents to colonize central Taiwan
1816		Settlers in central Taiwan are evicted by government troops
1824		Immigrant population in Taiwan number 1,786,883
1832		Zhang Bing rebellion
1839		Qing authorities demarcate Chinese territories in Taiwan and prohibit Chinese settlers from encroaching on native lands
1853		Lin Gong rebellion
1860		Convention of Beijing: Danshui and Anping are opened to foreigners
1862		Dai Wansheng rebels
1863		Lin Wencha is promoted to commander-in-chief of Fujian troops, the highest position ever attained by a Taiwanese during the Qing dynasty
1865		Dai Wansheng's rebellion is defeated
1867		American military expedition sent to Kenting in response to the Rover incident.
1868	20 November	Camphor War: British Navy occupies Anping over rights to export camphor without regard for Chinese regulations
1868	1 December	Camphor War: Qing dynasty gives in to British demands for reparations, freedom of missionary activity, and trade rights
1868		John Dodd calls in British gunboats to force Qing authorities to apologize and pay reparations for being accosted by an angry crowd
1869		Government troops are decreased from 14,425 to 7,621
1871	November	Mudan Incident: Ryukyuan sailors shipwreck off of southern Taiwan and Paiwan people mistake them for enemies, causing the death of 54 mariners
1874		Japanese invasion of Taiwan (1874): Japan sends a punitive expedition to Taiwan in retribution for the Mudan Incident and forces the Qing dynasty to pay indemnities
1874		Shen Baozhen has three roads constructed linking eastern and western Taiwan
1875		Taiwan is divided into two prefectures, Taipeh Prefecture and a modified Taiwan Prefecture
1881		Government troops are decreased to 4,500
1884	August	Keelung Campaign: French forces try to land at Keelung but are forced to withdraw by Chinese troops
1884	October	Keelung Campaign: French forces capture Keelung
1884	8 October	Battle of Tamsui: A French attack on Danshui is defeated
1885	22 June	Keelung Campaign: The French evacuate from Keelung
1886	June	Cadastral reform survey begins
1887		Taiwan is reorganized as Taiwan Province with Liu Mingchuan as its first governor
1887	April	Construction on a road from Taipei to Keelung begins
1888		Construction on a Taipei-Hsinchu road begins
1890	January	Cadastral reform survey is completed
1891		Construction of the Taipei-Keelung road is completed
1893		Construction of the Taipei-Hsinchu road is completed
1893		Han Chinese population in Taiwan reaches 2,545,000; 30 percent in the north, 27 percent in central Taiwan, and 43 percent in the south
1895	March	Pescadores Campaign (1895): Japan seizes Penghu (Pescadores)
1895	17 April	Taiwan and Penghu (Pescadores) are ceded by the Qing dynasty to Japan in the Treaty of Shimonoseki
1895	20 May	The Qing dynasty orders all officials to evacuate from Taiwan
1895	25 May	The Republic of Formosa is formed with Tang Jingsong as its leader, who secretly leaves for the mainland a few days later, and is succeeded by Liu Yongfu
1895	29 May	Japanese invasion of Taiwan (1895): Japanese forces land near Keelung
1895	7 June	Japanese invasion of Taiwan (1895): Japanese forces occupy Taipei
1895	October	Liu Yongfu leaves for the mainland
1895	21 October	Capitulation of Tainan: Tainan surrenders; so ends the Republic of Formosa
1896	June	Yunlin massacre: 6,000 Taiwanese are massacred by the Japanese at Yunlin
1897		More than 6,400 (23%) registered Taiwanese residents leave for mainland China
1899		The Bank of Taiwan established to encourage Japanese investment
1899		Taiwanese are recruited as policemen after a lower rank is created

== 20th century ==
Year	Date	Event
1900		Sun Zhongshan visits Taiwan
1902		Some 12,000 "bandit-rebels" are killed by the Japanese
1905		Population census records 2,492,784 Chinese, 82,795 "mountain people", and a total of 3,039,751 Taiwanese residents
1907		Beipu uprising: Hakka people and Saisiyat indigenouss rebel against Japanese rule unsuccessfully
1911		Liang Qichao visits Taiwan
1913		Japanese forces engage in a campaign bring indigenouss on the east coast under government control
1913		Hakka people rebel in Miaoli and are defeated
1914	May–August	Truku War: The Truku people rebel against Japanese rule unsuccessfully
1914	December	Itagaki Taisuke creates the Taiwan Doukakai, a Taiwan assimilationist movement with popular support from Taiwanese
1915	January	Taiwan Doukakai comes under attack by Japanese residents and authorities in Taiwan, and it is quickly disbanded
1915		Tapani Incident: Marks 20 years of resistance against Japanese rule
1921		The Taiwanese Cultural Association is founded
1925		Population of Taiwan grows to 3,993,408
1927		The Taiwanese People's Party breaks from the Taiwanese Cultural Association
1930		Wushe Incident: 300 Seediq people led by Mona Rudao raid a Japanese police station and attack an elementary school, killing 134 Japanese and two Han Chinese (by mistake); in response the government intensifies their efforts to subjugate the Atayal indigenous people
1935		Population of Taiwan grows to 5,212,426; Chinese population of eastern Taiwan increases to 70,000
1937	April	Chinese language in newspapers is banned and Classical Chinese is removed from the school curriculum
1943		Compulsory primary education begins. Enrollment rates reached 71.3% for Taiwanese children (including 86.4% for indigenous children) and 99.6% for Japanese children in Taiwan making Taiwan's enrollment rate the second highest in Asia after Japan.
1943		1943 Cairo Declaration: The Allies of World War II demand the restoration of all Chinese territories lost to Japan including Taiwan and Penghu
1944		Taiwan is bombed by American forces as part of Allied effort to defeat Japan
1945	14 August	Hirohito surrender broadcast: Hirohito announces Japan's surrender
1945	25 October	Retrocession Day: Rikichi Andō signs documents "restoring" Taiwan and Penghu (Pescadores) to the Republic of China with Chen Yi appointed as Chief Executive.
1945		Population of Taiwan grows to 6,560,000
1947	14 February	Taipei's rice market closes due to a riot
1947	28 February	February 28 Incident: Six officers attempt to arrest a woman selling cigarettes illegally in Taipei, a Taiwanese man is killed, and as a result mass riots break out all over the island
1947	8 March	February 28 Incident: Reinforcements from mainland China arrive in Keelung
1947	13 March	February 28 Incident: The Taiwanese resistance is defeated by KMT
1947	22 April	Chen Yi is replaced by Wei Daoming
1947	25 December	The Constitution of the Republic of China takes effect.
1948	November	More than 31,000 refugees enter Taiwan per week
1948	30 December	Wei Daoming is replaced by Chen Cheng as the Taiwanese officier appointed by the Republic of China.
1949		Approximately 5,000 refugees enter Taiwan each dayKMT retreat to Taiwan
1949	19 May	White Terror (Taiwan): KMT begins imposing 38 years of Martial law in Taiwan
1949	June	The New Taiwan dollar is introduced at an exchange rate of one NT to 40,000 old Taiwan dollars
1949	1 October	Chinese Civil War: CCP Chairman Mao Zedong proclaims the formation of the People's Republic of China in Peiping (Peking) which became their national capital.
1949	10 December	Chinese Civil War: The ROC relocates its government to Taipei.
1950	1 March	Chiang Kai-shek admits that he is personally responsible for the loss of mainland China at his inaugural ceremony for resuming the presidency of the Kuomintang
1950		Elections are held at local and provincial levels, but not at the national level
1950	1 May	Landing Operation on Hainan Island: Hainan falls to the Communists.
1951		Land Reform in Taiwan: The government starts selling public land to tenant farmers, nearly a fifth of Taiwan's arable land
1952		Agricultural exports reach U.S.$114 million
	28 April	The president of the Republic of China George Yeh and the governor of Japan Isao Kawada sign documents renouncing Japan's rights and claims on Taiwan and Penghu (Pescadores).
1953	January	Land Reform in Taiwan: Amount of land available to landlords is restricted and excess land is sold to tillers
1955	20 January	Battle of Yijiangshan Islands: People's Liberation Army forces ROC forces off the Yijiangshan Islands
1955		Population of Taiwan grows to 9,078,000
1958		Second Taiwan Strait Crisis: People's Liberation Army attacks Kinmen and the Matsu Islands but fail to take them
1958		Population of Taiwan reaches 10 million
1960		Chiang Kai-shek's presidency is extended past two terms
1960		Institutions of higher education increase to 15, primary schools rise to 1,982, and secondary schools to 299
1961		Slightly over half of Taiwan's population lives in urban areas
1964		Taiwanese Hokkien language is banned in schools and official settings
1965		Population of Taiwan grows to 12,628,000
1968		Compulsory education is extended from 6 to 9 years
1970		Taiwan's Gini coefficient falls to 0.321
1971		China and the United Nations: The United Nations recognizes the People's Republic of China as the government of China. The Republic of China withdraws from the United Nations.
1975		Population of Taiwan grows to 16,150,000
1979		The United States withdraws recognition of the Republic of China and recognizes the People's Republic of China. Four months later, the United States Congress passes the Taiwan Relations Act which establishes unofficial relations.
1980		Hsinchu Science Park founded
1985		Population of Taiwan grows to 19,258,000
1987	7 March	Lieyu Massacre was covered up on the frontline of Kinmen Defense Command
1987	15 July	Martial law in Taiwan: Martial law is lifted from Taiwan
1987		The Environmental Protection Administration reveals that 15 percent of farmland is contaminated by heavy metals
1990		Wild Lily student movement in Chiang Kai-shek Memorial Hall.
1990		Number of farm households fall to less than 20 percent
1991		Legislative Yuan and National Assembly elected in 1947 were forced to resign.
1991		The first democratic election of National Assembly.
1992		Fair Trade Law enacted.
1992		The first democratic election of the Legislative Yuan.
1992		1992 Consensus
1994		National Health Insurance begins.
1995		US government reverses policy and allows President Lee Teng-hui to visit the US. The People's Republic of China responds with the Third Taiwan Strait Crisis by launching a series of missiles into the waters off Taiwan. The Taiwan stock market loses one-third of its value.
1995		February 28 Incident monument erected; President Lee Teng-hui publicly apologizes on behalf of the KMT.
1995		Population of Taiwan grows to 21,300,000
1996		President Bill Clinton dispatches the USS Nimitz supercarrier to patrol the Taiwan Strait.
1996		The first direct presidential election; Lee Teng-hui elected.
1997		Private cellular phone companies begin services.
1999		Resolution on Taiwan's Future
1999		Chi-Chi earthquake.

== 21st century ==
Year	Date	Event
2000		Chen Shui-bian, the opposition candidate from the DPP, is elected president by a lead of 2.5% of votes, marking the end of the KMT's status as the ruling party. Voter turnout was 82.69%; first peaceful transfer of power.
2000		Four Noes and One Without
2001		Three mini-links between Kinmen, Matsu and the mainland of Fujian begin.
2001		Private fixed-line telephone companies begin services.
2001	September	Serious flooding caused by Typhoon Nari.
2002		Entry into the World Trade Organization.
2002		Penetration rate of cellular phones exceeds 100%.
2003		SARS outbreaks.
2003		North-link line railroad electrified.
2004		Second north-south freeway completed.
2004	February 28	228 Hand-in-Hand rally.
2004	March 20	President Chen Shui-bian is re-elected by a margin of 0.22% of votes after being shot the day before.
2004	December 31	Taipei 101 becomes the World's Tallest Building.
2005		The first direct commercial airplane flights from Beijing to Taipei for the Chinese New Year.
2005		The PRC passes an "anti-secession law" authorizing the use of force against Taiwan and the ROC government should it formally declare independence. In response, 1.6 million people march in Taipei against China's "anti-secession law". Similar marches occur across the world by Taiwanese nationalists. Protests against the PRC are held worldwide, including, but not limited to: Chicago, New York City, Washington DC, Paris, and Sydney.
2005	March–April	Pan-Blue leaders visit mainland China.
2005		President Chen is invited to and attends the funeral of Pope John Paul II. He is the first ROC president to visit the Vatican.
2005		The National Assembly of the Republic of China convenes for the last time to implement several constitutional reforms, including single-member two-vote districts, and votes to transfer the power of constitutional reform to the popular ballot, essentially abolishing itself.
2006		Rename "Chiang Kai-shek International Airport" to Taiwan Taoyuan International Airport.
2007	January	Taiwan's first high-speed rail line, Taiwan High Speed Rail, begins operation.
2007		Rename Chiang Kai-shek Memorial Hall to National Taiwan Democracy Memorial Hall.
2007		Taiwan applies for membership in the United Nations under the name "Taiwan", and is rejected by the General Assembly.
2008	March 9	Red Line of the Kaohsiung MRT completed.
2008	March 22	Presidential election; with 58.45% of the vote, KMT candidate Ma Ying-jeou defeats DPP candidate Frank Hsieh. Many voters boycott the referendum on whether and how to join the UN, so the level of voter participation required for the referendum to be considered valid is not achieved.
2008	May 20	Ma Ying-jeou sworn into office as the 12th President of ROC. Second peaceful transfer of power. Tsai Ing-wen inaugurated as the Chairperson of the DPP.
2008	July	For the first time in nearly 60 years, direct China-Taiwan flights are opened.
2008	October 25	1025 rally to safeguard Taiwan.
2008	November 3–7	Chen Yunlin visits Taiwan.
2008	November 6	Wild Strawberries Movement.
2008	November	Lien Chan, representing Ma Ying-jeou, meets CCP General Secretary Hu Jintao at APEC Peru 2008.
2009	July	World Games 2009 in Kaohsiung.
2009	August	Typhoon Morakot.
2009	October 17	Ma Ying-jeou inaugurated as Chairperson of the Kuomintang.
2012	January 14	Presidential election; with 51.6% of the vote, KMT candidate Ma Ying-jeou defeats DPP candidate Tsai Ing-wen.
2013		Ma Ying-jeou meets Pope Francis, the first ROC president to meet with the pope.
2014	March 18	Sunflower Student Movement: students occupy the Legislative Yuan to force a halt to the enforcement of the Cross-Strait Service Trade Agreement.
2014	November 29	Regional election; DPP wins 13 mayoral and magistrate seats.
2015		Ma Ying-jeou meets with CCP General Secretary Xi Jinping, the first Cross-Strait leader meeting.
2016	January 16	Presidential election; with 56.1% of the vote, DPP candidate Tsai Ing-wen defeats KMT candidate Eric Chu.
2016	May 20	Tsai Ing-wen sworn into office as the 14th President of ROC. Third peaceful transfer of power.
2020	January 11	Presidential election; with 57.1% of the vote, incumbent DPP candidate Tsai Ing-wen defeats KMT candidate Han Kuo-yu.
2020	January 21	First COVID-19 case in Taiwan.
2022	August 2–3	Nancy Pelosi, Speaker of the U.S. House of Representatives, visits Taiwan, the highest-ranking U.S. official to do so in 25 years.
2022	August 4–10	In response, the PLA conducts large-scale military exercises around Taiwan, including live-fire drills in zones encircling the island.
2023	April 8–10	After Tsai Ing-wen meets U.S. House Speaker Kevin McCarthy in California, the PLA holds the "Joint Sword" exercises around Taiwan.
2024	January 13	Presidential election; with 40.05% of the vote, DPP candidate Lai Ching-te defeats KMT candidate Hou Yu-ih and TPP candidate Ko Wen-je. This is the first time a party wins three consecutive direct presidential elections.
2024	May 20	Lai Ching-te sworn into office as the 16th President of ROC, with Hsiao Bi-khim as vice president. Fourth peaceful transfer of power.
2024	May 23–24	The PLA holds "Joint Sword-2024A" exercises around Taiwan following Lai's inauguration.
2024	October 14	The PLA holds "Joint Sword-2024B" exercises following Lai's National Day speech.
2025	March 3	Following pressure from U.S. President Donald Trump over the chip industry, Taiwanese semiconductor company TSMC announces an additional US$100 billion investment in Arizona fabrication plants.
2025	April 1–2	The PLA holds "Strait Thunder-2025A" exercises around Taiwan.
2025	December 29–30	The PLA holds "Justice Mission-2025" live-fire exercises around Taiwan.
