= 1932 in Taiwan =

- Decades: 1910s; 1920s; 1930s; 1940s; 1950s
- See also: Other events of 1932; History of Taiwan • Timeline • Years

Events from the year 1932 in Taiwan, Empire of Japan.

== Incumbents ==
=== Monarchy ===
- Emperor: Hirohito

=== Central government of Japan ===
- Prime Minister: Inukai Tsuyoshi, Saitō Makoto

=== Taiwan ===
- Governor-General – Ōta Masahiro, Hiroshi Minami, Nakagawa Kenzō

== Events ==
=== December ===
- 5 December – The opening of Hayashi Department Store in Tainan Prefecture.

== Births ==
- 16 September – Cheng Ch'ing-wen, former writer
- 16 December – Chiang Pin-kung, Chairman of the Straits Exchange Foundation (2008–2012). (d. 2018)
