= 1931 in Taiwan =

- Decades: 1910s; 1920s; 1930s; 1940s; 1950s
- See also: Other events of 1931; History of Taiwan • Timeline • Years

Events from the year 1931 in Taiwan, Empire of Japan.

== Incumbents ==
=== Monarchy ===
- Emperor: Hirohito

=== Central government of Japan ===
- Prime Minister: Hamaguchi Osachi, Wakatsuki Reijirō, Inukai Tsuyoshi

=== Taiwan ===
- Governor-General – Ishizuka Eizō, Ōta Masahiro

== Events ==
=== April ===
- 6 April – The opening of Consulate-General of the Republic of China in Taihoku Prefecture.

== Births ==
- 1 August – Hsu Shui-teh, President of Examination Yuan (1996–2002).
- 6 August – Hsu Li-teh, Vice Premier of the Republic of China (1993–1997).
- 3 December – Liu Sung-pan, President of Legislative Yuan (1992–1999).
