= Chin Lien =

Taiwanese poet and translator

Chin Lien (Chinese: 錦連; December 6, 1928 – January 6, 2013), originally named Chen Chin-lien, was a Taiwanese poet and translator from Changhua County, Taiwan. He spent his entire career working for Taiwan Railways Administration, and the railway became a significant motif for his thoughts and poetry, earning him the name of "Railway Poet". He also received several awards during his lifetime, including the Rong-Hou Poet Award of Taiwan (榮後臺灣人詩獎), the Oxford Prize for Taiwanese Writers (臺灣文學家牛津獎), the Li Poetry Society Translation Award (笠詩社翻譯獎), and the Taiwan New Literature Special Achievement Award (臺灣新文學特別推崇獎, which would be later renamed as 台灣新文學貢獻獎).

During the Japanese rule in Taiwan, Chin Lien wrote poetry in Japanese. He also developed his own poetic ideas and style through extensive reading of literary theories. In addition, his Japanese poem "Under North Wind" (在北風下) was published in Trend Periodical (潮流), and he joined the Ying Lin Arts Association in 1948. After overcoming language barriers post World War II, he began writing poetry and translating Japanese poems and poetic theories in Chinese. He also founded the Li Poetry Society (笠社), representing a generation that transcended language boundaries. In 2003, Chin Lien published a collection of Chinese poems titled The Origin of the Sea and a collection of Japanese poems titled Pivot.

Lee Kuei-shien noted that Chin Lien's poetry explored the "position of existence" through life while Chen Ming-tai (陳明台) characterized Chin Lien's poetry as having a "concrete yet clear and lyrical" quality. In addition, Chang Te-pen (張德本) pointed out that Chin Lien's "Railway Poetry'' elevated Taiwan's railway culture to the realm of poetry and contributed to the unique aesthetics of "topographical poetry" in Taiwan. In addition, while applying modern techniques in post-war Taiwanese poetry, Chin Lien's experiments with "poetry film" (電影詩) and "calligram" (圖像詩) were notable achievements, though are often overlooked. When Taiwanese poet Yang Chi-chang (楊熾昌) founded the Le Moulin Poetry Society in the 1930s, advocating surrealist poetry, Chin Lien's series of surrealist poems in the 1950s became a profound response to Yang's assertion about the native poetry scene of Taiwan.
