= 1928 in Taiwan =

- Decades: 1900s; 1910s; 1920s; 1930s; 1940s
- See also: Other events of 1928; History of Taiwan • Timeline • Years

The following is a list of events from the year 1928 in Taiwan, Empire of Japan.

== Incumbents ==
=== Monarchy ===
- Emperor: Hirohito

=== Central government of Japan ===
- Prime Minister: Tanaka Giichi

=== Taiwan ===
- Governor-General – Kamiyama Mitsunoshin (until 16 June), Kawamura Takeji (from 16 June)

== Events ==
=== March ===
- 12 March – The opening of Qiding railway station.

=== April ===
- 15 April – The formation of the Taiwanese Communist Party.
- 16 April – The opening of National Taiwan University. (Note: as Taihoku Imperial University)
