= 1929 in Taiwan =

- Decades: 1900s; 1910s; 1920s; 1930s; 1940s
- See also: Other events of 1929; History of Taiwan • Timeline • Years

The following is a list of events from the year 1929 in Taiwan, Empire of Japan.

== Incumbents ==
=== Monarchy ===
- Emperor: Hirohito

=== Central government of Japan ===
- Prime Minister: Tanaka Giichi, Hamaguchi Osachi

=== Taiwan ===
- Governor-General – Kawamura Takeji, Ishizuka Eizō

== Events ==
=== March ===
- 27 March - The opening of Gueiren Agriculture School in Tainan Prefecture.

=== October ===
- 1 October – The opening of Fugang railway station in Shinchiku Prefecture.

== Births ==
- 15 March – Clement Chang, politician (d. 2018)
- 24 May – Kao Ching-yuen, businessperson
- 6 June – Kao Chun-ming, presbyterian
