= 1935 in Taiwan =

- Decades: 1910s; 1920s; 1930s; 1940s; 1950s
- See also: Other events of 1935; History of Taiwan • Timeline • Years

Events from the year 1935 in Taiwan, Empire of Japan.

== Incumbents ==
=== Monarchy ===
- Emperor: Hirohito

=== Central government of Japan ===
- Prime Minister: Keisuke Okada

=== Taiwan ===
- Governor-General – Nakagawa Kenzō

== Events ==
=== April ===
- 21 April – The magnitude 7.1 Shinchiku-Taichū earthquake struck western Taiwan

=== October ===
- 10 October – The Taiwan Exposition: In Commemoration of the First Forty Years of Colonial Rule opens

=== November ===
- 28 November – The Taiwan Exposition: In Commemoration of the First Forty Years of Colonial Rule closes

== Births ==
- 5 May – Shih Chi-yang, Minister of Mainland Affairs Council (1991)
- 13 June – Chai Trong-rong, member of Legislative Yuan (1993–1996, 1997–2012)
- 20 July – Joseph Kuo, film director
