= 1927 in Taiwan =

- Decades: 1900s; 1910s; 1920s; 1930s; 1940s
- See also: Other events of 1927; History of Taiwan • Timeline • Years

Events from the year 1927 in Taiwan, Empire of Japan.

== Incumbents ==
=== Monarchy ===
- Emperor: Hirohito

=== Central government of Japan ===
- Prime Minister: Wakatsuki Reijirō, Tanaka Giichi

=== Taiwan ===
- Governor-General – Kamiyama Mitsunoshin

== Events ==
- Houbi Huang Family Mansion began its construction in 1924 and completed in 1927.
- 3 January – The opening of Central Bookstore in Taichū Prefecture.
- 10 July – Taiwanese People's Party, founded 1927, was nominally Taiwan's first political party.
- 25 August – The 6.8 M_{uk} Tainan earthquake shook southwestern Taiwan, killing 9–30 and injuring 27–100.

== Births ==
- 10 June – Lin Yang-kang, President of Judicial Yuan (1987–1994)
- 30 October – Ang It-hong, former singer
- 23 November – Yang Jih-sung, former forensic scientist
