= 1925 in Taiwan =

- Decades: 1900s; 1910s; 1920s; 1930s; 1940s
- See also: Other events of 1925; History of Taiwan • Timeline • Years

Events from the year 1925 in Taiwan, Empire of Japan.

== Incumbents ==
=== Monarchy ===
- Emperor: Taisho

=== Central government of Japan ===
- Prime Minister: Katō Takaaki

=== Taiwan ===
- Governor-General – Takio Izawa

== Births ==
- 22 March – Wang Yu-yun, Mayor of Kaohsiung City (1973–1981).
- 25 July – Chiu Chuang-huan, President of Examination Yuan (1993–1996).
- 20 November – Chen Wen-yu, former botanist, horticulturist.
