= The Taiwan Exposition: In Commemoration of the First Forty Years of Colonial Rule =

1935 exposition

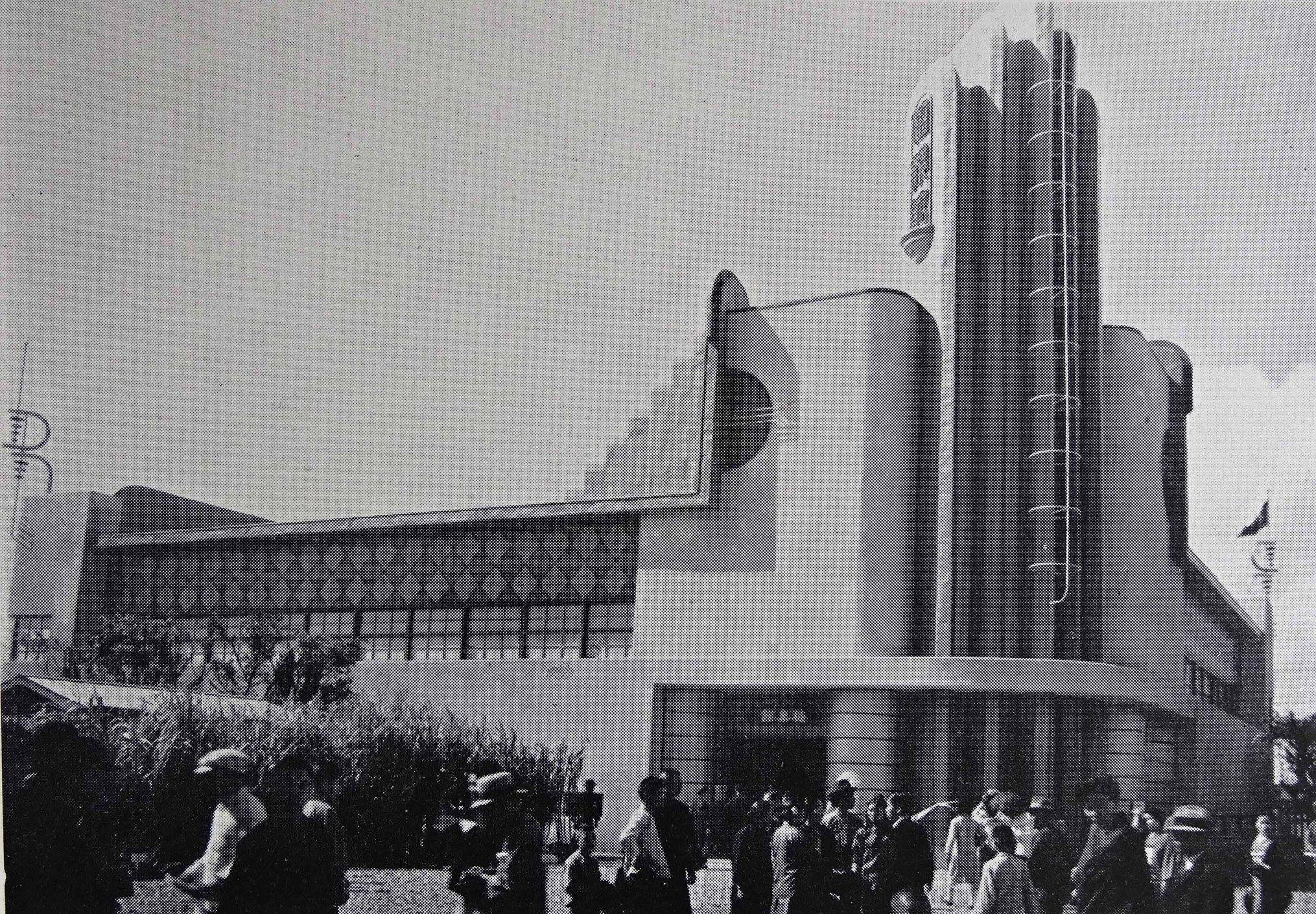
- Sugar Industry pavilion

Overview
- BIE-class: Unrecognized exposition
- Name: The Taiwan Exposition: In Commemoration of the First Forty Years of Colonial Rule
- Building(s): Sugar industry pavilion
- Visitors: over 1 million
- Organized by: Nakagawa Kenzō and Hiroyoshi Hirasuka

Participant(s)
- Countries: 4

Location
- Country: Japanese Taiwan
- City: Taihoku (now Taipei)

Timeline
- Opening: 10 October 1935
- Closure: 28 November 1935

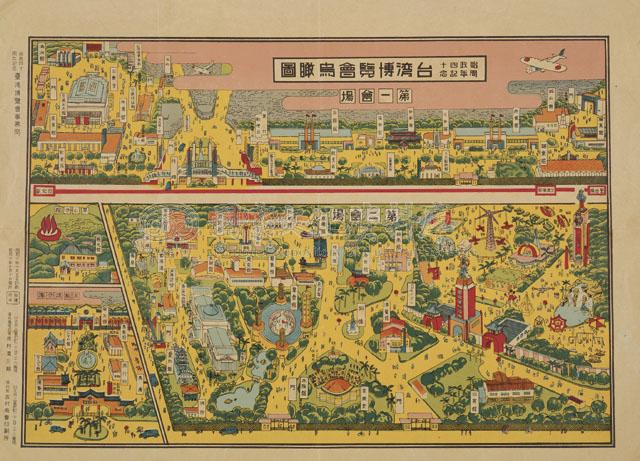
Contemporaneous bird's eye maps by Hatsusaburō Yoshida showing clockwise from top Ximending area, the larger bottom panel the National Taiwan Museum area, bottom right Daitōtei and lastly Beitou with a hot spring shown

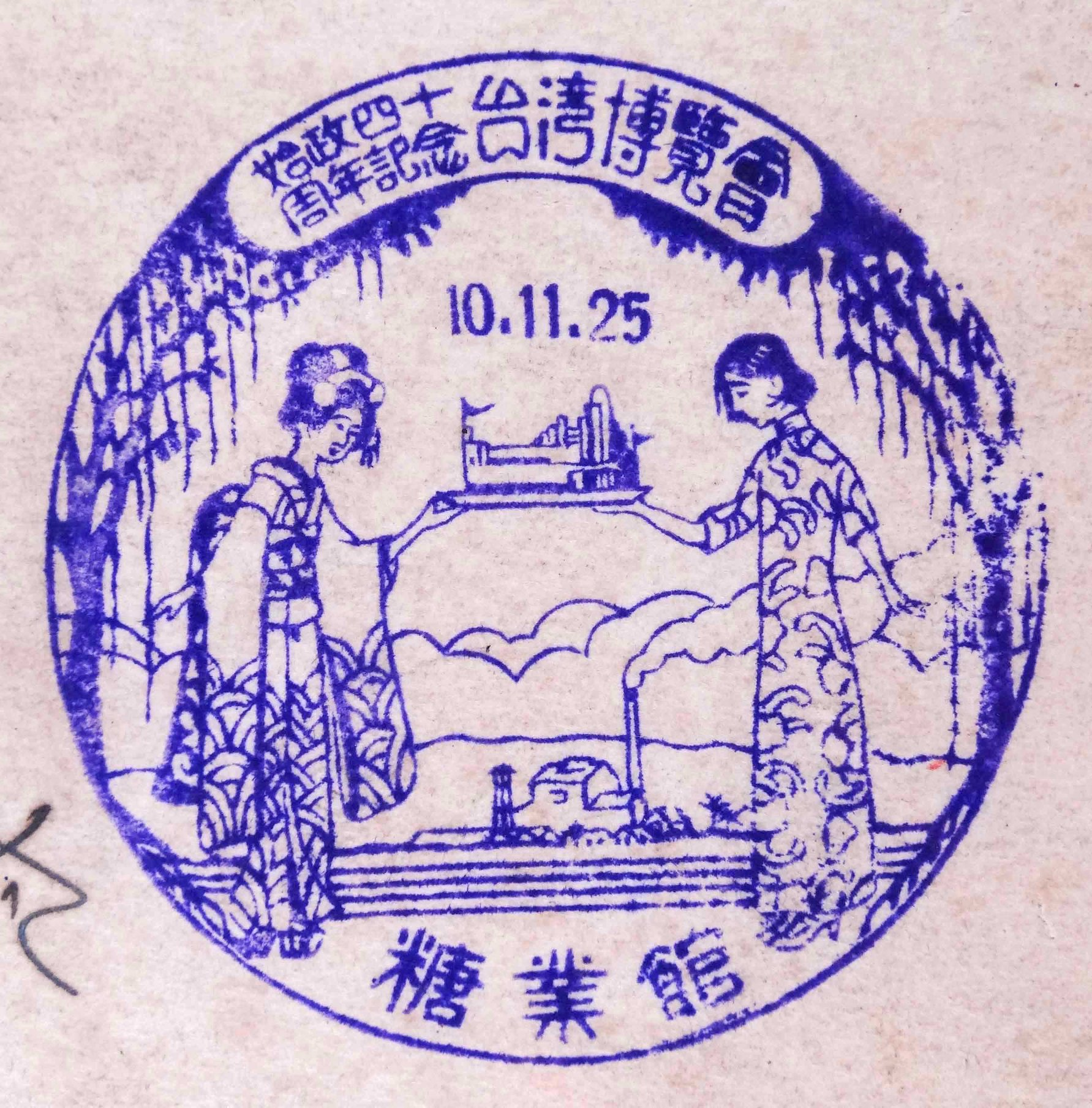
Dated (Japanese Nengō date format) rubber stamp of Pavilion of Sugar Industry in Formosa Memorial Exhibition

The Taiwan Exposition: In Commemoration of the First Forty Years of Colonial Rule was an exhibition held in Taihoku Prefecture in 1935, the 10th year of Hirohito's reign, to mark 40 years of the establishment of Japanese Formosa (now Taiwan).

The exhibition ran from 10 October 1935 for 50 days until 28 November, and was attended by over a million people. The Governor-General Nakagawa Kenzō and Director of General Affairs Hiroyoshi Hirasuka presided over the exhibition.

== Exhibition sites ==
The organisers were unable to find a suitable single site for the exhibition, and originally selected two sites in Zhongshan District, with a third in the more remote Beitou hot springs area. But, following concerns that this was too focused in the city centre one in Daitōtei was added,

=== Zhongshan Hall area, Ximending ===
The first area was in front of the recently completed Taipei Zhongshan Hall, Ximending, hosted the large ceremonies, showed Taiwanese agriculture, forestry, railway construction, mining, sugar and telecoms; displays from Japan, Korea and Manchuria and Japanese businesses including Mitsui & Co. and Nippon Steel Corp.. It was 4.29 hectares big.

There were displays from Formosa itself, Japan, Korea and Manchuria.

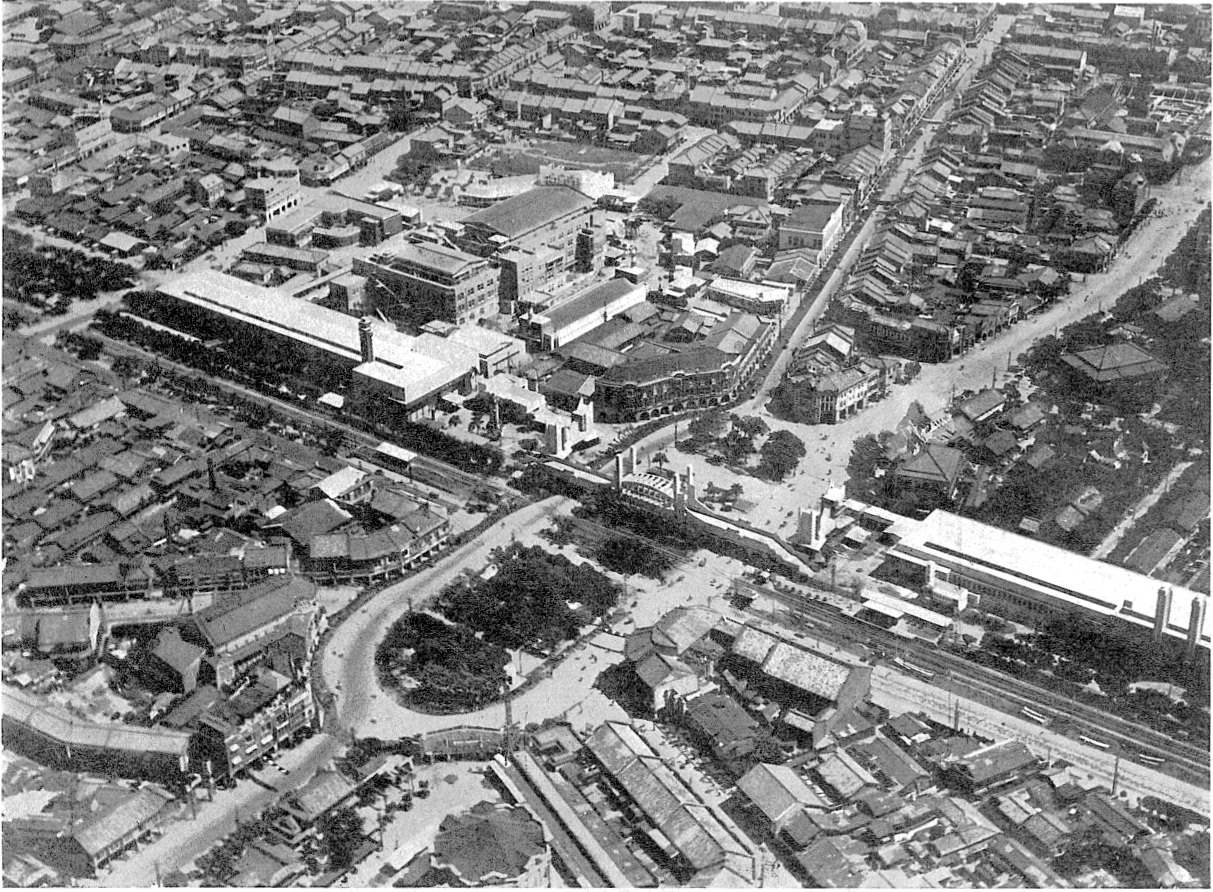
Aerial view of Ximending, Taihoku

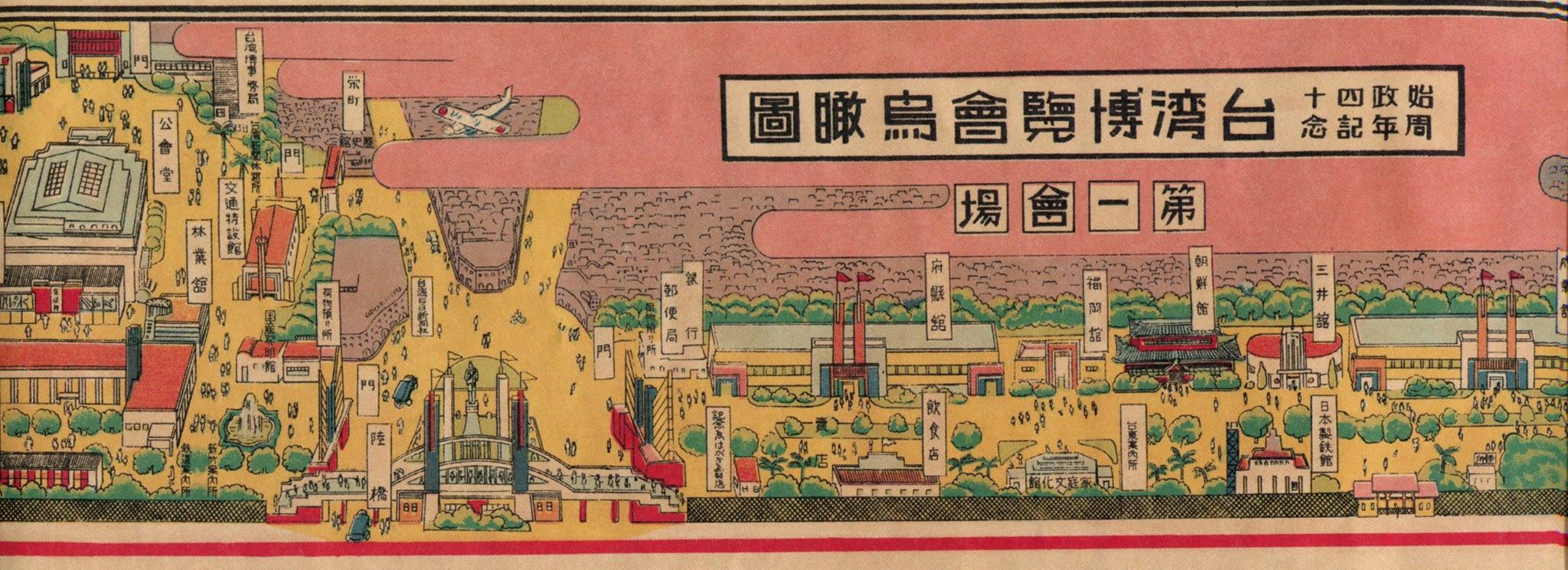
Contemporaneous bird's eye map of Ximending by Hatsusaburō Yoshida

=== National Taiwan Museum area ===
The "First Cultural Pavilion" was housed in what is now the National Taiwan Museum. It was 7.93 hectares big.

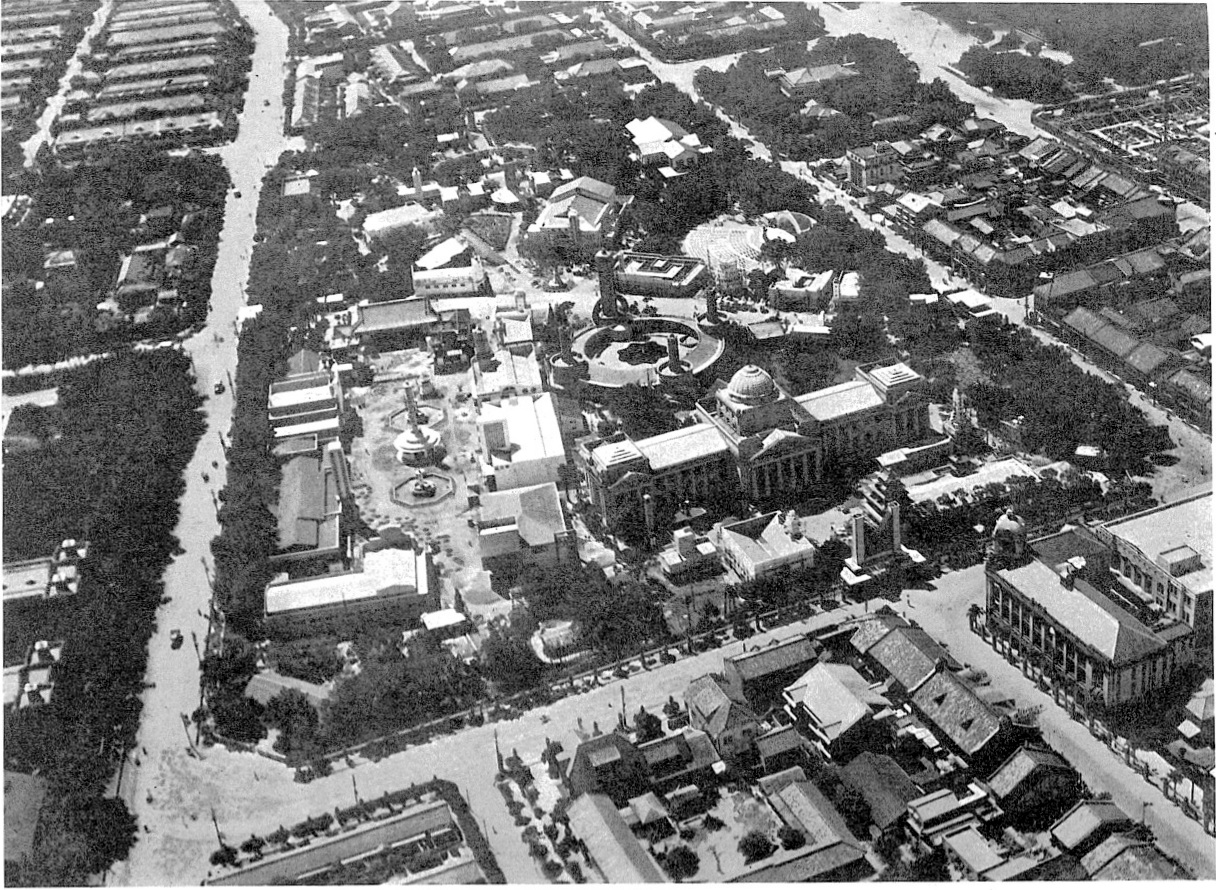
Aerial view of National Taiwan Museum area

=== Beitou hot springs ===
A site away from Taipei in the Beitou hot springs area was used to promote tourist attractions in Taiwan and plans for Datun National Park (now Yangmingshan National Park) and was housed in a "'Grass Mountain Exhibition Hall".

=== Daitōtei ===
The first two areas were both central Taipei, which led to local gentry making a request for a third exhibition area elsewhere in Taipei, in Daitōtei (now Dadaocheng).

This area hosted the "South Pavilion" which showed products from Siam (Thailand), the Philippines province and the Fujian Province, along with information about plans for Japan's future expansion.

Entertainments intended to attract Taiwanese people to this section included the opera performer Mei Lanfang, a Mazu parade and a Peking opera group.

== Attendance ==
It is estimated that over a million people attended the fair, with 2,750,000 individual visits to the several exhibition halls.
