= 1936 in Taiwan =

- Decades: 1910s; 1920s; 1930s; 1940s; 1950s
- See also: Other events of 1936; History of Taiwan • Timeline • Years

Events from the year 1936 in Taiwan, Empire of Japan.

== Incumbents ==
=== Monarchy ===
- Emperor: Hirohito

=== Central government of Japan ===
- Prime Minister: Keisuke Okada, Kōki Hirota

=== Taiwan ===
- Governor-General – Nakagawa Kenzō, Seizō Kobayashi

== Events ==
=== November ===
- 26 November – The completion of Zhongshan Hall in Taihoku Prefecture.

== Births ==
- 14 January – Su Nan-cheng, Mayor of Kaohsiung (1985–1990)
- 26 June - Lee Ming-liang, Minister of Department of Health (2000–2002)
- 28 September – Kuo Ting-tsai, Member of Legislative Yuan (1993–2002)
- 24 October – Lin Ming-chang, chemist
- 8 November – Huang Kun-huei, Chairman of Taiwan Solidarity Union (2007–2016)
