= Tenta Akaboshi =

Japanese politician

- 赤星 典太
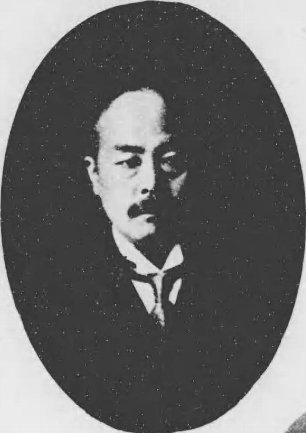

Governor of Nagasaki Prefecture
- In office 27 May 1921 – 16 October 1922
- Monarch: Taishō
- Preceded by: Katsusaburō Watanabe
- Succeeded by: Hiratsuka Hiroyoshi

Governor of Nagano Prefecture
- In office 12 August 1915 – 27 May 1921
- Monarch: Taishō
- Preceded by: Yūichirō Chikaraishi
- Succeeded by: Tadahiko Okada

Governor of Yamaguchi Prefecture
- In office 28 April 1914 – 12 August 1915
- Monarch: Taishō
- Preceded by: Eitaro Mabuchi
- Succeeded by: Kurogane Yasuyoshi

Governor of Kumamoto Prefecture
- In office 1 June 1913 – 28 April 1914
- Monarch: Taishō
- Preceded by: Kamiyama Mitsunoshin
- Succeeded by: Kawakami Chikaharu

Personal details
- Born: 22 October 1868 Kumamoto, Higo, Japan
- Died: 13 June 1958 (aged 89)
- Education: Tokyo Imperial University

Tenta Akaboshi (赤星 典太, Akaboshi Tenta; 22 October 1868 – 13 June 1958) was a Japanese politician. He was governor of Kumamoto Prefecture (1913–1914), Yamaguchi Prefecture (1914–1915), Nagano Prefecture (1915–1921) and Nagasaki Prefecture (1921–1922).

== Awards ==
- 1916 – Victory Medal

Government offices
Preceded by Kamiyama Mitsunoshin	Governor of Kumamoto Prefecture; 1913-1914	Succeeded by Ōta Masahiro
Preceded by	Governor of Yamaguchi Prefecture; 1914-1915	Succeeded by
Preceded by Yūichirō Chikaraishi	Governor of Nagano; 1915-1921	Succeeded by
Preceded by	Governor of Nagasaki Prefecture; 1921-1922	Succeeded by
