= 1924 in Taiwan =

- Decades: 1900s; 1910s; 1920s; 1930s; 1940s
- See also: Other events of 1924; History of Taiwan • Timeline • Years

Events from the year 1924 in Taiwan, Empire of Japan.

== Incumbents ==
=== Monarchy ===
- Emperor: Taisho

=== Central government of Japan ===
- Prime Minister: Yamamoto Gonnohyōe (until 7 January), Kiyoura Keigo (7 January – 11 June), Katō Takaaki (from 11 June)

=== Taiwan ===
- Governor-General: Uchida Kakichi (until 1 September), Takio Izawa (from 1 September)

== Births ==
- 18 February – Chin Shunshin, novelist, translator and cultural critic.
- 10 November – Tsai Wan-lin, businessman.
- 11 December – Lin Hêng-t'ai, writer and poet.
