= 1934 in Taiwan =

- Decades: 1910s; 1920s; 1930s; 1940s; 1950s
- See also: Other events of 1934; History of Taiwan • Timeline • Years

Events from the year 1934 in Taiwan, Empire of Japan.

== Incumbents ==
=== Monarchy ===
- Emperor: Hirohito

=== Central government of Japan ===
- Prime Minister: Saitō Makoto, Keisuke Okada

=== Taiwan ===
- Governor-General – Nakagawa Kenzō

== Births ==
- 1 July – Chen Kuei-miao, acting Mayor of Tainan (1985)
- 25 August – Hsiao Teng-tzang, Ministry of Justice (1988–1989)
- 24 December – Chen Chin-hsing, Magistrate of Hsinchu County (1981–1989)
