= 1930 in Taiwan =

- Decades: 1910s; 1920s; 1930s; 1940s; 1950s
- See also: Other events of 1930; History of Taiwan • Timeline • Years

Events from the year 1930 in Taiwan, Empire of Japan.

== Incumbents ==
=== Monarchy ===
- Emperor: Hirohito

=== Central government of Japan ===
- Prime Minister: Hamaguchi Osachi

=== Taiwan ===
- Governor-General – Ishizuka Eizō

== Events ==
=== October ===
- 18 October – The opening of Changhua Wude Hall in Taichū Prefecture.
- 27 October – Start of Musha Incident.

== Births ==
- 25 July – Wang Jui, actor

== Deaths ==
- 28 November – Mona Rudao, Seediq chief
