= 1926 in Taiwan =

- Decades: 1900s; 1910s; 1920s; 1930s; 1940s
- See also: Other events of 1926; History of Taiwan • Timeline • Years

Events from the year 1926 in Taiwan, Empire of Japan.

== Incumbents ==
=== Monarchy ===
- Emperor: Taisho, Hirohito

=== Central government of Japan ===
- Prime Minister: Katō Takaaki, Wakatsuki Reijirō

=== Taiwan ===
- Governor-General – Takio Izawa, Kamiyama Mitsunoshin

== Events ==
=== May ===
- 12 May – The establishment of Taiwan Provincial Ilan School of Agriculture and Forestry in Taihoku Prefecture.

== Births ==
- 31 March – Tseng Wen-hui, First Lady of the Republic of China (1988–2000)
- 15 October – Koo Kwang-ming, politician (died 2023)
