= 1933 in Taiwan =

- Decades: 1910s; 1920s; 1930s; 1940s; 1950s
- See also: Other events of 1933; History of Taiwan • Timeline • Years

Events from the year 1933 in Taiwan, Empire of Japan.

== Incumbents ==
=== Monarchy ===
- Emperor: Hirohito

=== Central government of Japan ===
- Prime Minister: Saitō Makoto

=== Taiwan ===
- Governor-General – Nakagawa Kenzō

== Events ==
=== March ===
- 2 March – The completion of Ōgon Shrine in Taihoku Prefecture.
- 3 March – Ching Yun University is established.

=== November ===
- 28 November – The opening of Tamsui Church in Taihoku Prefecture.

== Births ==
- 3 April – Fu Da-ren, Taiwanese television presenter (d. 2018)
