= Lin Hêng-t'ai =

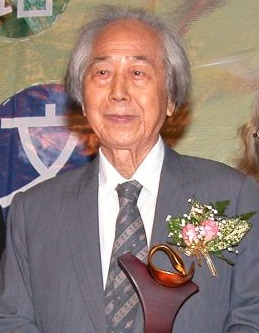
Portrait of Lin Hêng-t'ai.

Lin Hêng-t'ai (Chinese: 林亨泰; December 11, 1924 - September 23, 2023), born in Peitou Town, Changhua County, Taiwan, was a member of the Modernist movement in the Taiwanese poetry field. Later, he became one of the founders of the Li Poetry Society (笠詩社) and the first editor-in-chief of the society's poetry journal. He is considered a poet and poetry critic of the "generation that straddles between [Japanese and Chinese] languages."

== Biography ==
Lin Hêng-t'ai began experimenting with modern poetry during the Japanese rule period. In 1947, he joined the literary society Ying Lin Arts Association (銀鈴會) and published poems in various periodicals. In 1949, he published his first poetry collection, The Voice of Soul (靈魂の產聲). In 1956, he was invited to join the modern poetry society Modernists due to his acquaintance with poet Chi Hsien (紀弦) and his earlier exposure to Japanese modernist ideas. In 1964, he co-founded the Li Poetry Society, focusing on nativist themes, and became the first editor-in-chief of the poetry journal Li Poetry (笠). He dedicated himself to exploring "temporality" and "nativization". His primary literary genres are modern poetry and essays.

Lin Hêng-t'ai once explained his literary life in the essay "Walking Through the Modern, Defining the Local." It can be seen that in exploring his literature, he not only observed it from the perspective of "modernism", which is more commonly focused on by people, but also connected it with "locality", "nativism", and even "Taiwanese consciousness".

Scholar Lu Hsing-chang (呂興昌) believes that Lin Hêng-t'ai, having walked through modernity and positioned himself in nativism, witnesses the glory and insignificance, beauty and sorrow of Taiwan with a global perspective. He uses concise and sharp language for discourse, achieving remarkable results. Another poet and fellow member of the Li Poetry Society, Lee Kuei-shien (李魁賢), acknowledges Lin as a modernist who practices and demonstrates poetry, providing substantial contributions to Taiwan's poetic aesthetics. Lin Hêng-t'ai has authored works such as Collected Poems of Lin Hêng-t'ai (林亨泰詩集), The Basic Spirit of Modern Poetry: On Sincerity (現代詩的基本精神——論真摯性), and Collection of Claw Marks (爪痕集).
