= 1937 in Taiwan =

- Decades: 1910s; 1920s; 1930s; 1940s; 1950s
- See also: Other events of 1937; History of Taiwan • Timeline • Years

Events from the year 1937 in Taiwan, Empire of Japan.

== Incumbents ==
=== Monarchy ===
- Emperor: Hirohito

=== Central government of Japan ===
- Prime Minister: Kōki Hirota, Senjūrō Hayashi, Fumimaro Konoe

=== Taiwan ===
- Governor-General – Seizō Kobayashi

== Events ==
- December - the Ministry of Basic Industries(Republic of China) was reorganized as the Ministry of Economic Affairs.

Japan conquer Pratas Island.

== Births ==
- 19 June – Li Kuei-hsien, author and poet
- 2 October – Liu Cheng-tao, cyclist
