= Yūichirō Chikaraishi =

Japanese politician

- 力石 雄一郎
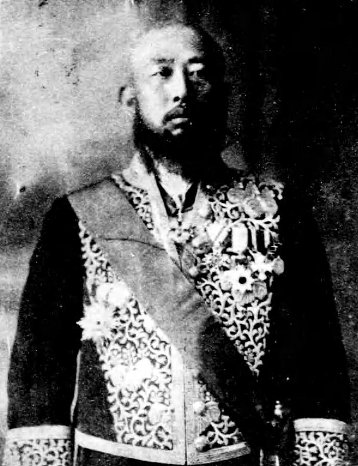

Governor of Osaka Prefecture
- In office 25 May 1928 – 5 July 1929
- Monarch: Hirohito
- Preceded by: Harumichi Tanabe
- Succeeded by: Shibata Zenzaburō
Additional positions
Governor of Niigata Prefecture
In office 28 February 1928 – 25 May 1928
Monarch	Hirohito
Preceded by	Shōhei Fujinuma
Succeeded by	Yuujirou Ozaki
Governor of Akita Prefecture
In office 17 May 1927 – 28 February 1928
Monarch	Hirohito
Preceded by	Nakano Hoichi
Succeeded by	Iwao Koinuma
Governor of Miyagi Prefecture
In office 27 May 1921 – 24 June 1924
Monarch	Taishō
Preceded by	Mori Masataka
Succeeded by	Manpei Ueda
Governor of Ibaraki Prefecture
In office 17 January 1917 – 27 May 1921
Monarch	Taishō
Preceded by	Unosuke Okada
Succeeded by	Genjirō Moriya
Governor of Ōita Prefecture
In office 12 August 1915 – 17 January 1917
Monarch	Taishō
Preceded by	Kurogane Yasuyoshi
Succeeded by	Niiduma Komagorō
Governor of Nagano Prefecture
In office 28 April 1914 – 12 August 1915
Monarch	Taishō
Preceded by	Ichiro Yoda
Succeeded by	Tenta Akaboshi

Personal details
- Born: 30 June 1876 Ōzu, Ehime, Japan
- Died: 17 March 1933 (aged 56)
- Resting place: Tama Cemetery
- Party: Rikken Seiyūkai

Yūichirō Chikaraishi (30 June 1876 – 17 March 1933) was a Japanese politician. He was governor of Nagano Prefecture (1914–1915), Ōita Prefecture (1915–1917), Ibaraki Prefecture (1917–1921), Miyagi Prefecture (1921–1924), Akita Prefecture (1927–1928), Niigata Prefecture (1928) and Osaka Prefecture (1928–1929).
