= Hatsusaburō Yoshida =

Japanese cartographer and artist (1884–1955)

- Born: Hatsusaburo Izumi; March 4, 1884
- Died: August 16, 1955 (aged 71)
- Occupations: Cartographer, artist
- Known for: Bird's-eye view maps of cities and towns

Hatsusaburō Yoshida (吉田 初三郎, Yoshida Hatsusaburō; March 4, 1884–August 16, 1955) was a Japanese cartographer and artist, known by his bird's-eye view maps of cities and towns. Known as the "Hiroshige of the Taisho Era," Yoshida created over 3,000 maps in his lifetime.

== Biography ==
Yoshida was born in Kyoto in 1884 as Hatsusaburo Izumi. His father died when he was a year old, so he adopted his mother's surname. At age 10, Yoshida became a textile designer apprentice, dyeing yūzen textiles for kimono. When he turned 25, he studied foreign painting with Masaro Kagiki, but turned to commercial art at Kagiki's recommendation.

In 1914, his first bird's-eye view "Keihan Train Guide" was praised by Emperor Showa (then Crown Prince), who was aboard the Keihan Train on a school trip.

The popularity of Hatsushiro's birds-eye view maps increased due to the tourism boom in Japan from Taisho to Showa era. Yoshida established the Taishō meisho zue-sha (Taishō famous places' illustration company), which was later renamed Kankō-sha (Tourism company). Yoshida visited the places which he depicted on maps, talking to people and studying popular attractions.

In 1921, in commemoration of the 50th anniversary of the introduction of rail transport in Japan, the Ministry of Railways decided to publish "Railway Travel Information" guides with maps illustrated by Yoshida. He also made posters for the International Tourism Bureau's "Beautiful Japan" campaign in the 1930s.

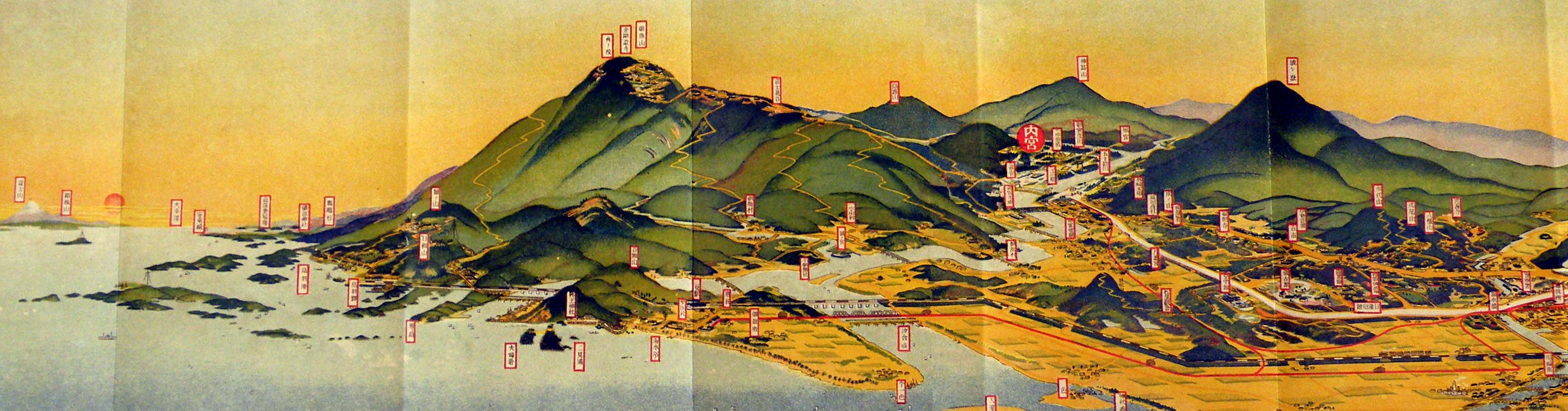
Ise Meisho Zue, by Hatsusaburo Yoshida (1919)

During that decade Yoshida was flooded with requests to create a bird's-eye maps from the whole country (including Manchuria and Taiwan). He hired disciples to help with his works, while moving his base to Inuyama City and Hachinohe City (Tanesashi Coast). He also received requests from many friends, like royalty such as Prince Takamatsu and soldiers such as Iwane Matsui. However, during World War II, Yoshida's map production slowed down; the military judged those maps would be inconvenient in that time, as they would potentially reveal military secrets, such as secret harbors, to the enemy.

Yoshida's first major work following the war was a bird's-eye view of the aftermath of the Hiroshima atomic bombing.

Yoshida died in 1955. In 1999, a retrospective exhibition about his maps was held at the Sakai City Museum.
