= Chen Wen-yu =

Taiwanese botanist, horticulturist and inventor

- 陳文郁
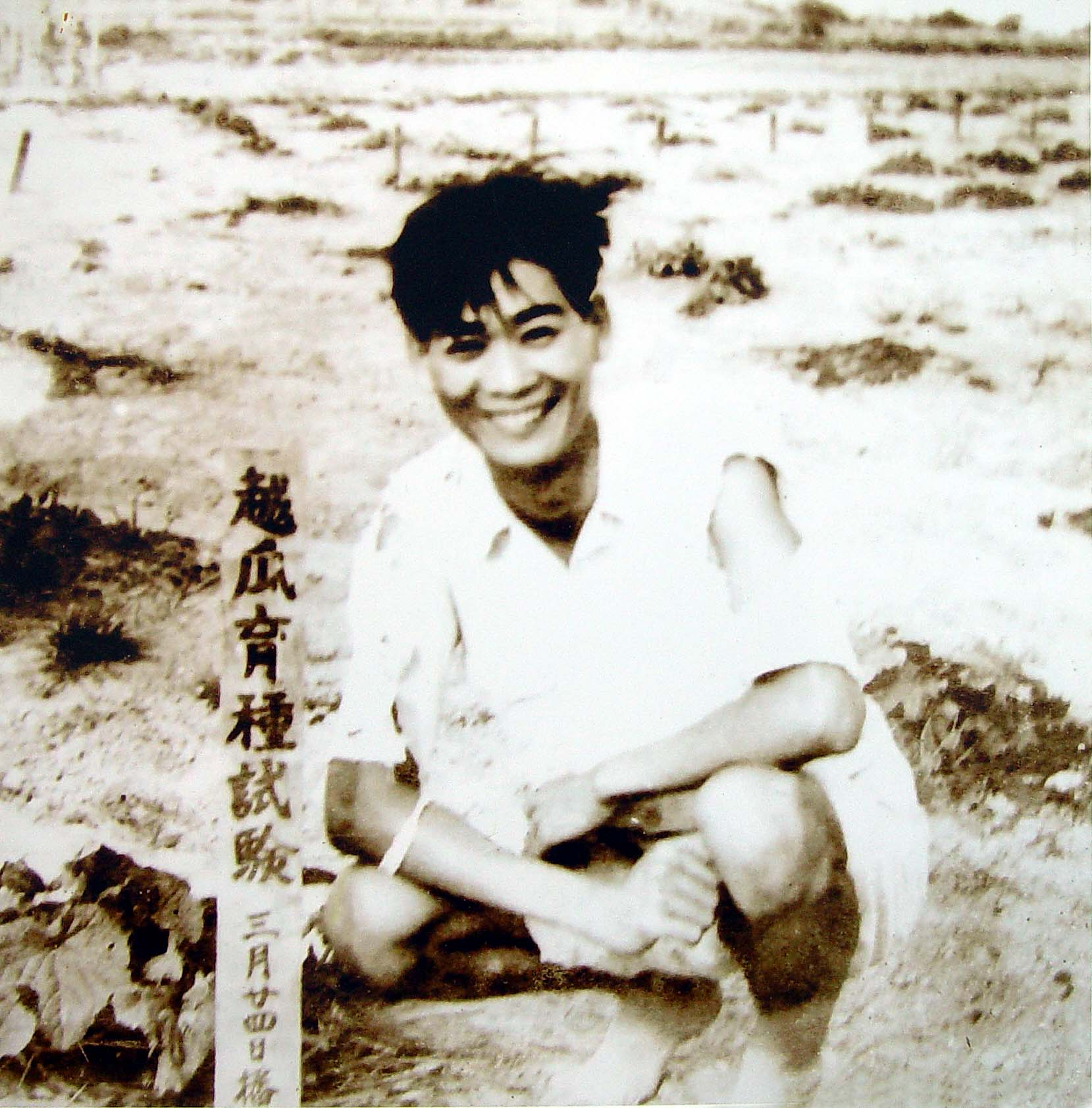
- Born: 20 November 1925; Tainan, Taiwan
- Died: 7 December 2012 (aged 87); Kaohsiung, Taiwan
- Scientific career
- Fields: Botany

Chen Wen-yu (Chinese: 陳文郁; 20 November 1925 – 7 December 2012) was a Taiwanese botanist, horticulturist and an inventor in agriculture science. He bred new strains and varieties of plants, including fruits, flowers, and vegetables over his 70-year-long career. At the time of his death, one fourth of the watermelon seeds in the world were supplied by Chen. He developed over 280 varieties of new watermelon species including seedless watermelons, yellow skinned watermelons with red meat (called “Diana”), and baby watermelons. He became known as the “Watermelon King” because of his extensive work with watermelons. He established Known-You Seed Cooperation at 1968, also as director of Known-You Social Welfare Foundation since 1991.

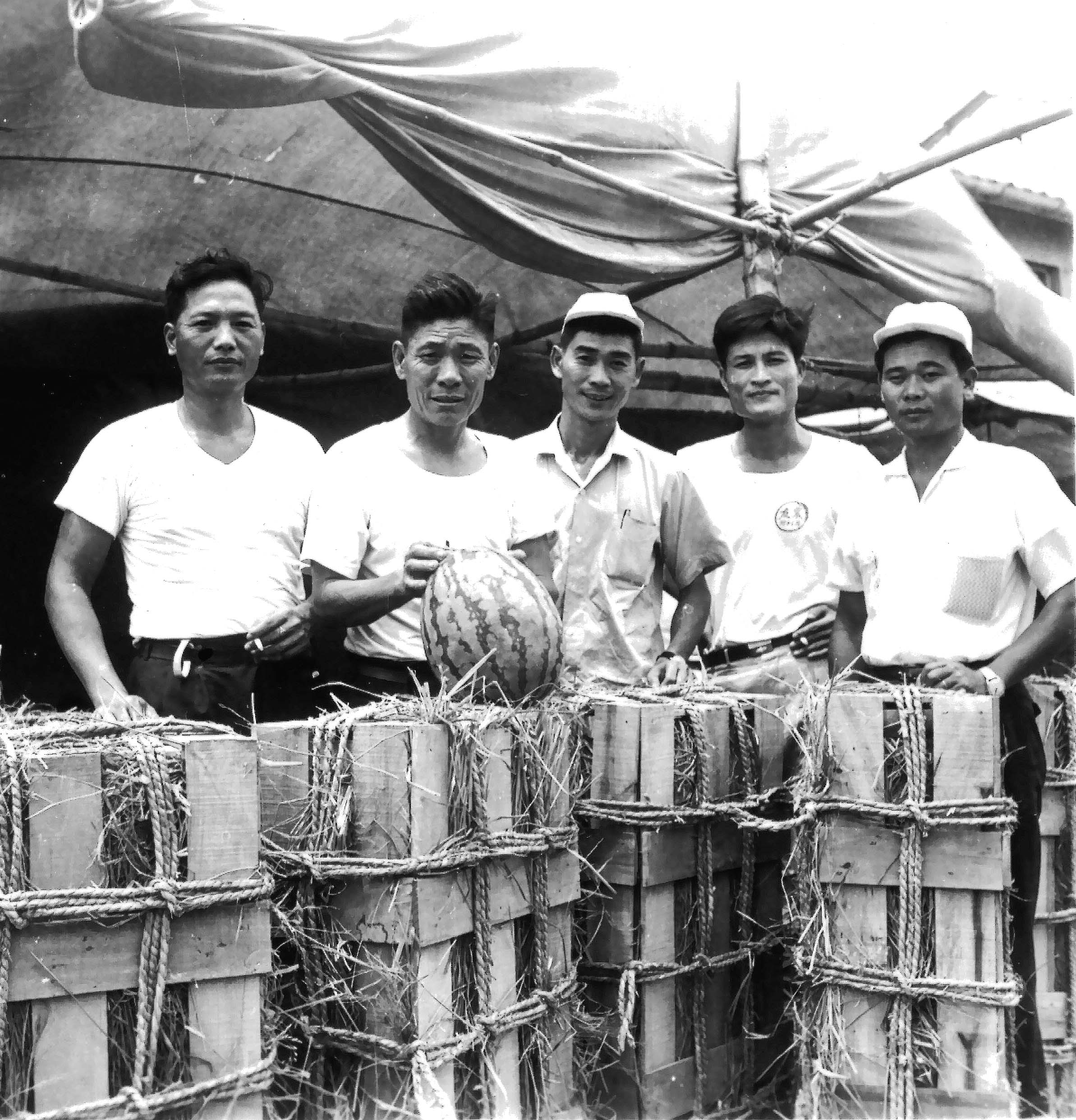
Chen Wen-yu (center) with his colleagues in a watermelon field.

== Early life ==
Born when Taiwan was under Japanese rule and raised in a rural village in Tainan's Yongkang District, which is in southern Taiwan, Chen realized the hardships farmers experienced in his childhood. When he was 14, he decided that he would study agricultural technology to help improve farmers’ lives. After graduating from an agricultural school, he worked with Dr. Tsuneo Eguchi (江口庸雄) in the FengShan Tropical Horticultural Experiment Branch of the Agricultural Research Institute, a department of the Council of Agriculture (COA) in Kaohsiung. During this time, he was inspired by Luther Burbank and Ivan Vladimirovich Michurin, who were pioneers in agricultural science. Two years later, he served in the Japanese Army near the end of World War II. After the war, he returned to the FengShan Tropical Horticultural Experiment Branch again, and he worked on plant breeding research. Recalling memories of his father's poor crops and the seeds they came from, Chen devoted himself to the research and development of seeds better suited to Taiwan's climate and soil. This in turn led him to study cross-pollination techniques. With funding from the US Agency for International Development, he pursued advanced studies in horticulture at Chiba University in Japan. He later returned to Taiwan and founded the Kaohsiung-based Known-You Seed Co with his friends in 1968. The name “Known-You” can be transliterated as “friends of farmers” in Taiwanese.

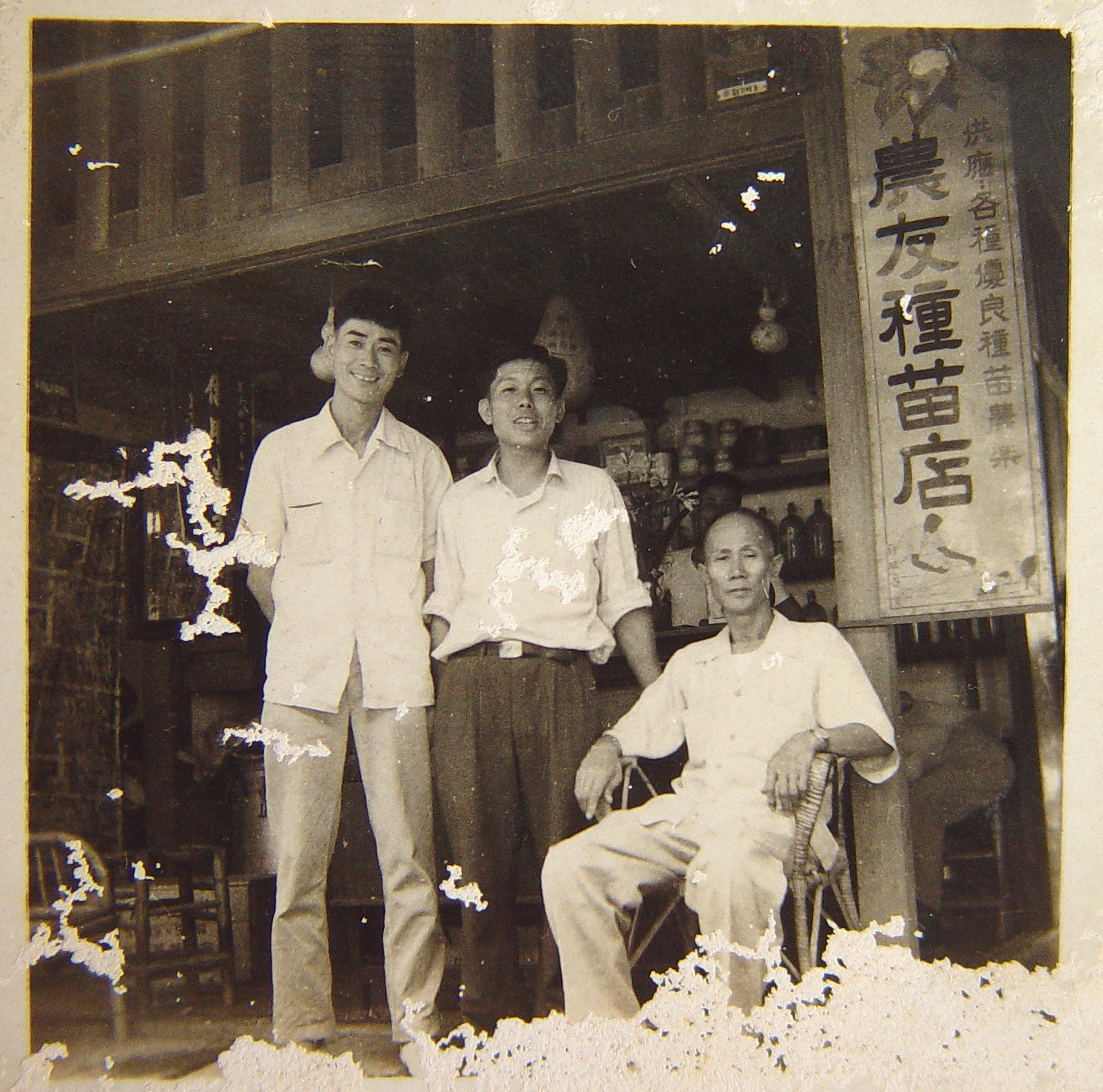
Chen Wen-yu pictured in front of Known-You Seed Co. with friends.

== Work ==
Chen's company focuses on developing new varieties of watermelon seeds, but has also created around 1,100 new vegetable and fruit varieties, with 600 of them going into mass production. So far over 90 percent of watermelon seeds sold to farmers in Taiwan are created by Chen. Due to the species improvement he has made, watermelons are cultivated on the island in the four seasons and in various kinds of soils. Meanwhile, the US seed-testing organization All-America Selections, which is the oldest, most established international testing organization to promote new seed varieties in North America, rewarded a total seven awards for watermelons, four of which were from Known-You. The company has a seedling farm in the US and branch offices in China, India and several Southeast Asian countries such as Singapore and Thailand. Inspired by Chen Wen-yu's mentor, Dr. Tsuneo Eguchi who mentioned about helping farmers in southeastern Asia, Chen funded the establishment of a hospital ( Known-You Seed Farmers’ Hospital) in Myanmar to provide free medical services for farmers there in 2001 and also set up a foundation to help improve local farmers’ welfare.

== Seedless watermelon ==
Chen Wen-yu was particularly interested in the theory of seedless watermelons proposed by the Japanese researcher Hitoshi Kihara in 1951, according to which crossing a female tetraploid plant (itself the product of genetic manipulation) with diploid pollen creates a triploid plant that is sterile, but can produce seedless fruit if pollenized by a diploid plant. Sound as the theory was, in practice none of the seed companies in Japan could successfully cultivate the seedless variety on a commercial scale. After incessant experimentation, in 1962 Chen also succeeded in producing seedless watermelons. The subsequent boom in Taiwan's seedless watermelon sales generated an annual export value of more than NT$100 million.

== Hobbies ==
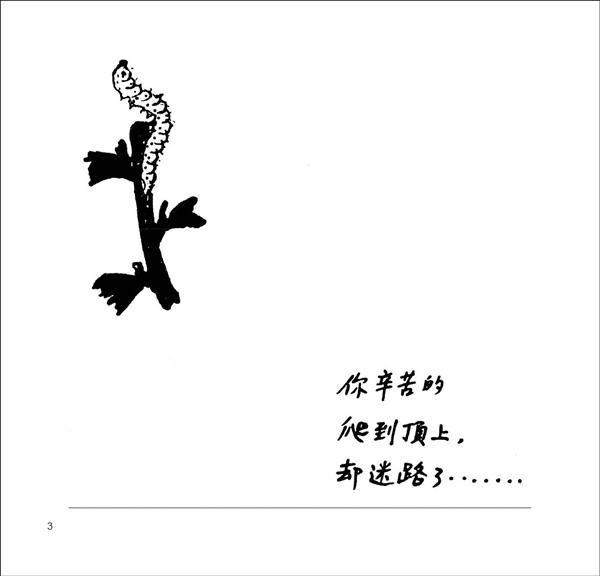
"You take lots effort to climb up to the top, but get lost at the end", extracted from "A-Ying's Drawing and Saying".

Chen Wen-yu started "Known-Yu News" in order to encourage his colleagues to enjoy writing and painting. By using a pen-name "A-Ying", Chen has written a column called as "A-Ying's Drawing and Saying (阿英的畫話)" over 30 years. Two books has been published by selecting the popular articles in his column.

== Rewards ==
- 2003 Chen Wen-yu received the honor of the “National Agricultural Medal of Honor, 1st Grade" by Council of Agriculture.
- 2006 Chen Wen-yu was one of six Taiwanese icons on Discovery Channel TV shows "Portraits: Taiwan".
- 2010 Chen Wen-yu received APSA SPECIAL AWARD.
- 2011 Chen Wen-yu was conferred The Order of Brilliant Star with Violet Grand Cordon, by President Ma Ying-Jeou in recognition of his great contribution to national and social development.
