= Le Moulin Poetry Society =

Literary society in Taiwan, founded 1933

Le Moulin Poetry Society (Chinese: 風車詩社) was the first literary society in the Japanese rule period to advocate surrealism in Taiwan. It was established in October 1933 in Tainan, Taiwan, by poets such as Yang Chih-chang (楊熾昌). Regarding the origin of the name Le Moulin (“windmill”), Yang Chih-chang pointed out several explanations: first, the admiration for the windmill scenery in the Saline Land they often visited; second, the influence of the French theater "Le Moulin”; third, the belief that the Taiwanese poetry field needed to bring in new air and establish a new atmosphere.

The writing styles of the members of Le Moulin Poetry Society varied, but many of them had experiences studying in Japan during a time when the modernist poetry movement in Japan was flourishing. Consequently, they were greatly influenced. For example, Yang Chih-chang advocated that poetry is the embodiment of intellect and focused on creating surreal images with local characteristics. Another member of the poetry society, Li Chang-jui (李張瑞), was influenced by the styles of French poets Jean Cocteau and Paul Valéry. His works had a light rhythm and experimented with various poetic forms.

The poetry society published the literary magazine Le Moulin in October 1933. It was an irregular publication, with 75 copies printed per issue. The content included poems, short stories, essays, and other works by the society members. The magazine had a total of four issues until December 1934. The story of this poetry society and its members was adapted into a documentary titled Le Moulin (日曜日式散步者). No. 26 of Taiwan Literature: English Translation Series (2010) is a special issue dedicated to Yang Chih-chang and Le Moulin poetry society.
