= Hiroshi Minami (politician) =

Japanese politician

Senior Second Rank Hiroshi Minami
- 南 弘
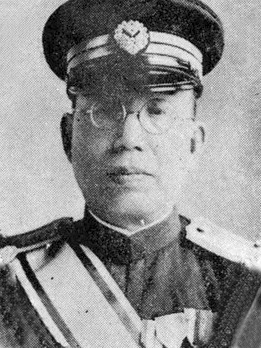

15th Governor-General of Taiwan
- In office 2 March 1932 – 26 May 1932
- Monarch: Hirohito
- Preceded by: Ōta Masahiro
- Succeeded by: Nakagawa Kenzō

Minister of Communications
- In office 26 May 1932 – 8 July 1934
- Prime Minister: Saitō Makoto
- Preceded by: Chūzō Mitsuji
- Succeeded by: Tokonami Takejirō

Governor of Fukuoka Prefecture
- In office 1 June 1913 – 16 April 1914
- Monarch: Taishō
- Preceded by: Kawaji Toshiatsu
- Succeeded by: Taniguchi Tomegoro

Chief Cabinet Secretary
- In office 30 August 1911 – 21 December 1912
- Prime Minister: Saionji Kinmochi
- Preceded by: Shibata Kamon
- Succeeded by: Tasuku Egi
- In office 4 January 1908 – 14 July 1908
- Prime Minister: Saionji Kinmochi
- Preceded by: Bin-ichi Ishiwatari
- Succeeded by: Shibata Kamon

Member of the Privy Council
- In office 24 December 1936 – 8 February 1946
- Monarch: Hirohito

Member of the House of Peers
- In office 3 July 1912 – 28 December 1936 Nominated by the Emperor

Personal details
- Born: 13 November 1869 Himi, Toyama, Japan
- Died: 8 February 1946 (aged 76) Tokyo, Japan
- Party: Rikken Seiyūkai
- Education: Tokyo Imperial University

Hiroshi Minami (南 弘, Minami Hiroshi; 13 November 1869 – 8 February 1946) was a Japanese bureaucrat, politician and cabinet minister in Taishō and early Shōwa period Japan.

== Early life ==
Minami was born as Iwama Tetsuro, the younger son of a wealthy farming family in Himi, Toyama, who had served for three generations in the Toyama prefectural assembly. He graduated from Tokyo Imperial University with a legal degree and passed his civil service examinations in 1896. Afterwards, he married the eldest daughter of Minami Heikichi, the chairman of the Toyama Prefectural Assembly, and changed his name to Minami Hiroshi.

== Political career ==
After serving in several posts within the Prime Minister's office and the Home Ministry, Minami was appointed Chief Cabinet Secretary under the First Saionji Cabinet in 1908, and served in that post again from 1911 to 1912. In December 1912, he was appointed to a seat in the House of Peers. From 1913 to 1914, he was appointed Governor of Fukuoka Prefecture. In 1918, he was appointed Undersecretary for Education.

On 2 March 1932, Minami became Governor-General of Taiwan, but served in that post for less than three months before being replaced on 26 May, following the May 15 Incident to become Communications Minister in the Saitō Cabinet. He was the first cabinet minister to have been appointed from Toyama Prefecture, and served in this post for two years and two months.

In 1937, Minami proposed that a new cabinet-level ministry be created, separating out the health care and social insurance / pensions portions of the Home Ministry. This “Ministry of Welfare” (the predecessor of the modern Ministry of Health, Labour, and Welfare) was realized in 1938, and Minami is credited with coining the kanji used in its name.

In 1943, Minami served as chairman of the National Language Council, a government body established to standardize the Tōyō kanji and Modern kana usage to simplify education. He was also a member of the Privy Council, where he earned the enmity of the military by his outspoken remarks against Japanese militarism.

Minami died of carbon monoxide poisoning on 8 February 1946 while in the middle of a meeting.

Government offices
Preceded by Ōta Masahiro	Governor-General of Taiwan; March 1932 – May 1932	Succeeded by Nakagawa Kenzō
Political offices
Preceded by Shibata Kamon	Chief Cabinet Secretary; August 1911 – December 1912	Succeeded by Egi Tasuku
Preceded by Chūzō Mitsuji	Minister of Communications; May 1932 – July 1934	Succeeded by Tokonami Takejirō
