= Ying Lin Arts Association =

The Ying Lin Arts Association (Chinese: 銀鈴會) was a literary group founded in 1942 by three high school classmates from Taichung Municipal Taichung First Senior High School: Chang Yen-hsun (張彥勳), Chu Shih (朱實), and Hsu Ching-shih (許清世). In 1949, the April 6 Incident (四六事件) broke out, and the political situation became tense. On May 20 of the same year, martial law was imposed, and Taiwan started its decades-long white terror period. The Ying Lin Arts Association was forced to disband.

After its establishment in 1942, the Ying Lin Arts Association published two mimeographed periodicals: Grass of Fate (緣草) and Trend Periodical (潮流). The objectives of these publications were twofold: literary research and the promotion of the development of new literature in Taiwan. Grass of Fate was first published in 1944 and continued until 1947, with more than 10 issues. It resumed publication in 1948 under the name Trend Periodical, producing six issues. In addition to featuring modern poetry, essays, fiction, short poems, haiku, and commentaries written by members, the publications also included diverse content such as critiques, explanations of classical poetry, and information about the members. The language used in these publications was predominantly Japanese in Grass of Fate and included both Chinese and Japanese in Trend Periodical.

After the war, the government of the Republic of China began a large-scale arrest in Taipei on April 6, 1949, triggered by the April 6 Incident involving students from National Taiwan University and National Taiwan Normal University. Due to constant investigations, arrests, or executions of its members, the Ying Lin Arts Association was forced to disband.

Scholar Mei-Hui Juan (阮美慧) believes that the Ying Lin Arts Association preserved the legacy of modern poetry from the Japanese rule period. In the 1970s, with the founding of the poetry journal Li Poetry (《笠》詩刊), it played a significant role in the development of post-war Taiwanese poetry. The association also transitioned from the aesthetic of modernism to promoting a style that emphasized the spirit of Taiwan's local culture, making it a crucial influence on the development of post-war Taiwanese poetry.
