= Kawamura Takeji =

Japanese businessperson and politician

Junior Third Rank Kawamura Takeji
- 川村 竹治
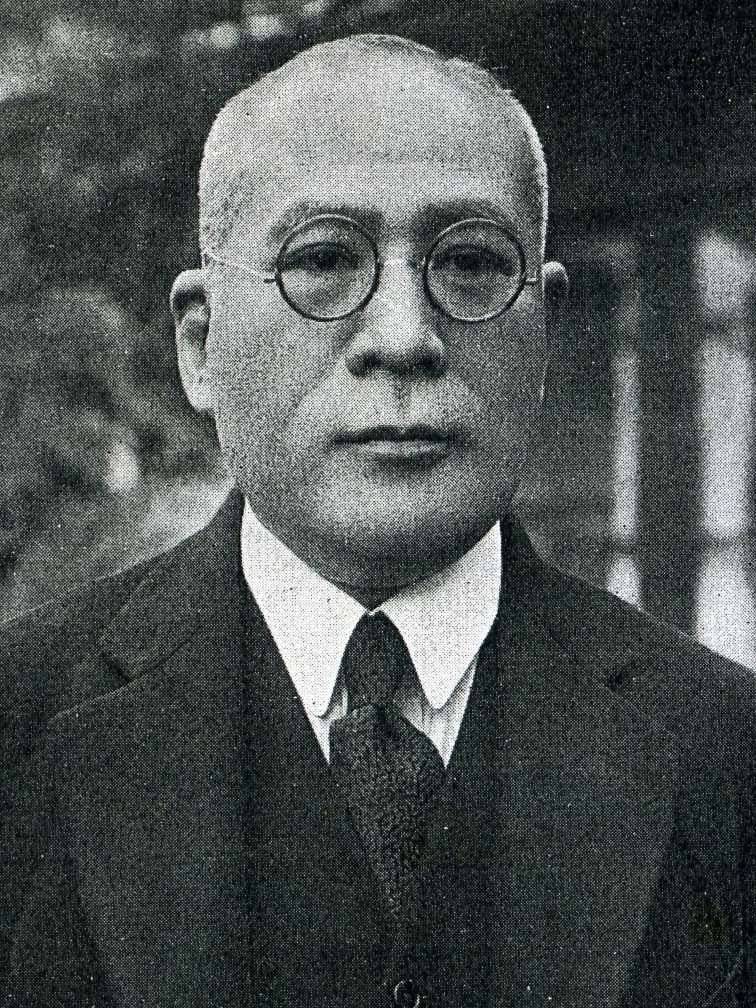
- Kawamura in 1932

Governor-General of Taiwan
- In office 16 June 1928 – 30 July 1929
- Monarch: Shōwa
- Preceded by: Kamiyama Mitsunoshin
- Succeeded by: Ishizuka Eizō

Minister of Justice
- In office 25 March 1932 – 26 May 1932
- Prime Minister: Inukai Tsuyoshi
- Preceded by: Suzuki Kisaburō
- Succeeded by: Koyama Matsukichi

Member of the House of Peers
- In office 6 June 1922 – 2 May 1947 Nominated by the Emperor

President of the South Manchuria Railway
- In office 24 October 1922 – 22 June 1924
- Preceded by: Hayakawa Senkichirō
- Succeeded by: Ban'ichirō Yasuhiro
Gubernatorial offices
Governor of Aomori Prefecture
In office 17 January 1917 – 3 October 1918
Monarch	Taishō
Preceded by	Matsujirō Kohama
Succeeded by	Sawada Ushimaro
Governor of Kagawa Prefecture
In office 9 June 1914 – 8 January 1915
Monarch	Taishō
Preceded by	Kanokogi Kogorō
Succeeded by	Raizo Wakabayashi
Governor of Wakayama Prefecture
In office 4 September 1911 – 9 June 1914
Monarchs	Meiji; Taishō
Preceded by	Kawakami Chikaharu
Succeeded by	Kanokogi Kogorō

Personal details
- Born: 1 September 1871 Kazuno, Akita, Japan
- Died: 8 September 1955 (aged 84) Mejiro, Tokyo, Japan
- Party: Rikken Seiyūkai
- Education: Tokyo Imperial University

Kawamura Takeji (川村 竹治; 1 September 1871 – 8 September 1955) was a Japanese businessman and the Governor-General of Taiwan (1928–1929), Minister of Justice (1932). He was Governor of Wakayama Prefecture (1911–1914), Kagawa Prefecture (1914–1915) and Aomori Prefecture (1917–1918).

Government offices
Preceded by Kamiyama Mitsunoshin	Governor-General of Taiwan; June 1928 – July 1929	Succeeded by Ishizuka Eizō
Political offices
Preceded by Suzuki Kisaburō	Justice Minister; March 1932 – May 1932	Succeeded by Koyama Matsukichi
