= Ōta Masahiro =

Japanese politician

Senior Third Rank Ōta Masahiro
- 太田 政弘
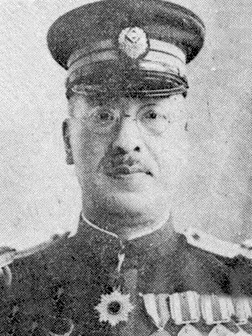

14th Governor-General of Taiwan
- In office 16 January 1931 – 2 March 1932
- Monarch: Hirohito
- Preceded by: Ishizuka Eizō
- Succeeded by: Hiroshi Minami

10th Governor-General of the Kwantung Leased Territory
- In office 17 August 1929 – 16 January 1931
- Monarch: Hirohito
- Preceded by: Kenjirō Kinoshita
- Succeeded by: Tsukamoto Seiji

Member of the House of Peers
- In office 29 January 1926 – 2 May 1947 Nominated by the Emperor

Superintendent General of the Tokyo Metropolitan Police Department
- In office 11 June 1924 – 20 April 1927
- Preceded by: Akaike Atsushi
- Succeeded by: Mitsuo Miyata
Gubernatorial offices
Governor of Aichi Prefecture
In office 16 June 1923 – 11 June 1924
Monarch	Taishō
Preceded by	Hikoharu Kawaguchi
Succeeded by	Haruki Yamawaki
Governor of Niigata Prefecture
In office 18 April 1919 – 16 June 1923
Monarch	Taishō
Preceded by	Katsusaburō Watanabe
Succeeded by	Shinzō Ohara
Governor of Kumamoto Prefecture
In office 13 October 1916 – 18 April 1919
Monarch	Taishō
Preceded by	Kawakami Chikaharu
Succeeded by	Hikoharu Kawaguchi
Governor of Ishikawa Prefecture
In office 1 April 1915 – 13 October 1916
Monarch	Taishō
Preceded by	Kiichirō Kumagai
Succeeded by	Kahei Toki
Governor of Fukushima Prefecture
In office 1 June 1913 – 1 April 1915
Monarch	Taishō
Preceded by	Nishikubo Hiromichi
Succeeded by	Sukeharu Horiguchi

Personal details
- Born: 16 November 1871 Sakata, Yamagata, Japan
- Died: 24 January 1951 (aged 79) Kamakura, Kanagawa, Japan
- Party: Rikken Minseitō
- Education: Tokyo Imperial University

Ōta Masahiro (太田 政弘; 16 November 1871 – 24 January 1951) was the 14th Governor-General of Taiwan (1931–1932). He was Governor of Fukushima Prefecture (1913–1915), Ishikawa Prefecture (1915–1916), Kumamoto Prefecture (1916–1919), Niigata Prefecture (1919–1923) and Aichi Prefecture (1923–1924). He was a graduate of the University of Tokyo.

Government offices
Preceded by Kinoshita Kenjiro	Governor-General of Kwantung; August 1929 – January 1931	Succeeded by Tsukamoto Seiji
Preceded by Ishizuka Eizō	Governor-General of Taiwan; January 1931 – March 1932	Succeeded by Minami Hiroshi
