= Ishizuka Eizō =

Japanese politician (1866–1942)

Junior Second Rank Ishizuka Eizō
- 石塚 英蔵
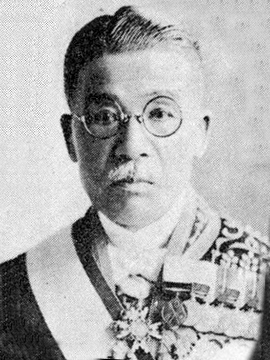

13th Governor-General of Taiwan
- In office 30 July 1929 – 16 January 1931
- Monarch: Hirohito
- Preceded by: Kawamura Takeji
- Succeeded by: Ōta Masahiro

Member of the Privy Council
- In office 29 March 1934 – 28 July 1942
- Monarch: Hirohito

Member of the House of Peers
- In office 21 October 1916 – 6 April 1934 Nominated by the Emperor

Personal details
- Born: 1 September 1866 Aizuwakamatsu, Mutsu, Japan
- Died: 28 July 1942 (aged 75) Shinjuku, Tokyo, Japan
- Party: Rikken Minseitō
- Education: Tokyo Imperial University

Ishizuka Eizō (石塚 英蔵; 1 September 1866 – 28 July 1942) was the 13th Governor-General of Taiwan (1929–1931). He was a graduate of the University of Tokyo.

Preceded by Kawamura Takeji	Governor-General of Taiwan; 1929–1931	Succeeded by Ōta Masahiro
