= Kamiyama Mitsunoshin =

Junior Second Rank Kamiyama Mitsunoshin
- 上山 満之進
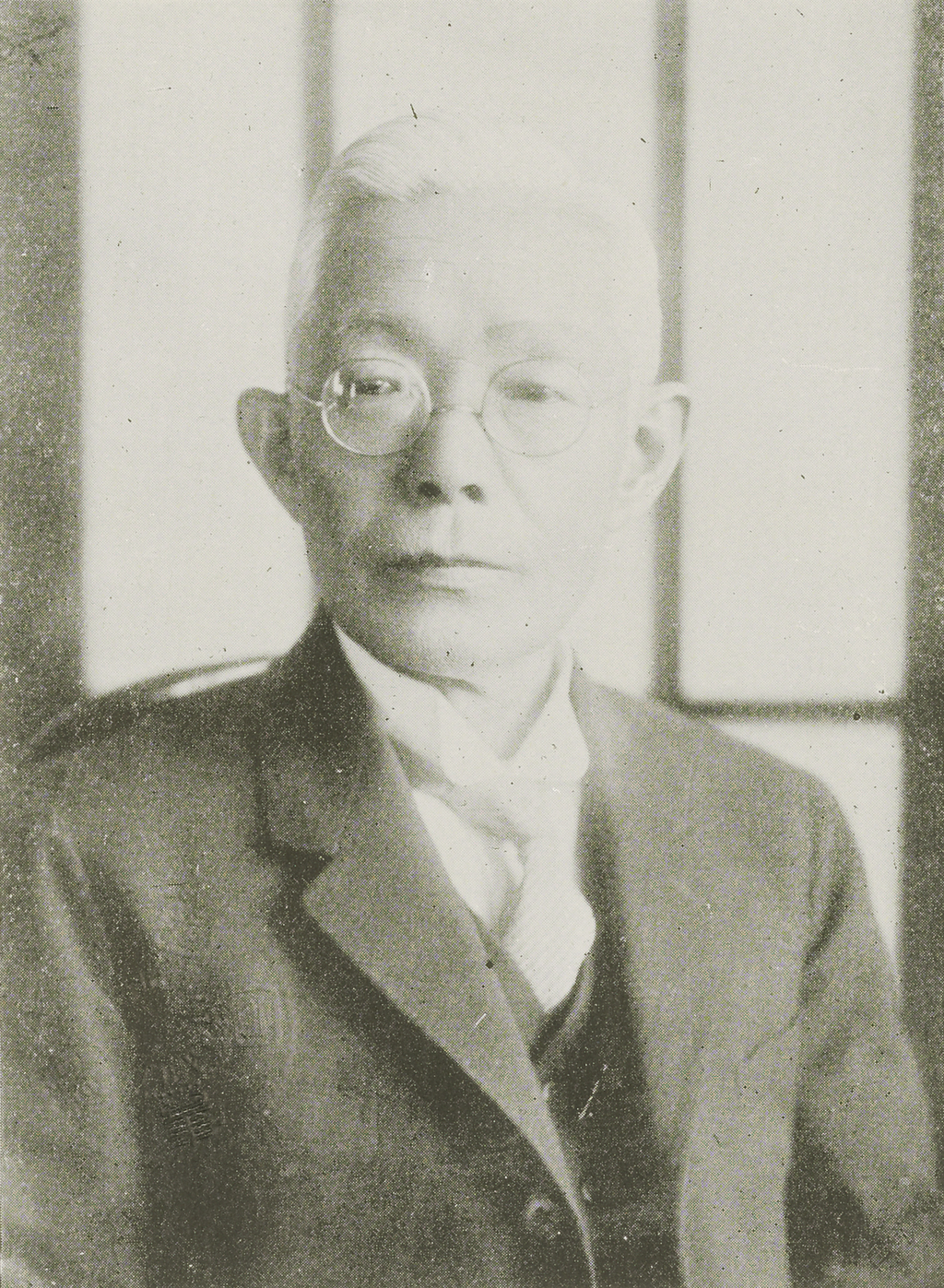

11th Governor-General of Taiwan
- In office 16 July 1926 – 16 June 1928
- Monarchs: Taishō; Hirohito
- Preceded by: Izawa Takio
- Succeeded by: Kawamura Takeji

Member of the Privy Council
- In office 9 December 1935 – 30 July 1938
- Monarch: Hirohito

Member of the House of Peers
- In office 21 September 1918 – 14 December 1935 Nominated by the Emperor

Governor of Kumamoto Prefecture
- In office 30 December 1912 – 1 June 1913
- Monarch: Taishō
- Preceded by: Tadashi Munakata
- Succeeded by: Tenta Akaboshi

Personal details
- Born: 31 October 1869 Hōfu, Yamaguchi, Japan
- Died: 30 July 1938 (aged 68) Tokyo, Japan
- Education: Tokyo Imperial University

Kamiyama Mitsunoshin (上山 満之進, 31 October 1869 – 30 July 1938) was the 11th Governor-General of Taiwan (1926–1928). He was Governor of Kumamoto Prefecture (1912–1913).

Government offices
Preceded by Izawa Takio	Governor-General of Taiwan; July 1926 – June 1928	Succeeded by Kawamura Takeji
