= Kenzō Nakagawa =

Japanese bureaucrat and political figure

- 中川 健蔵
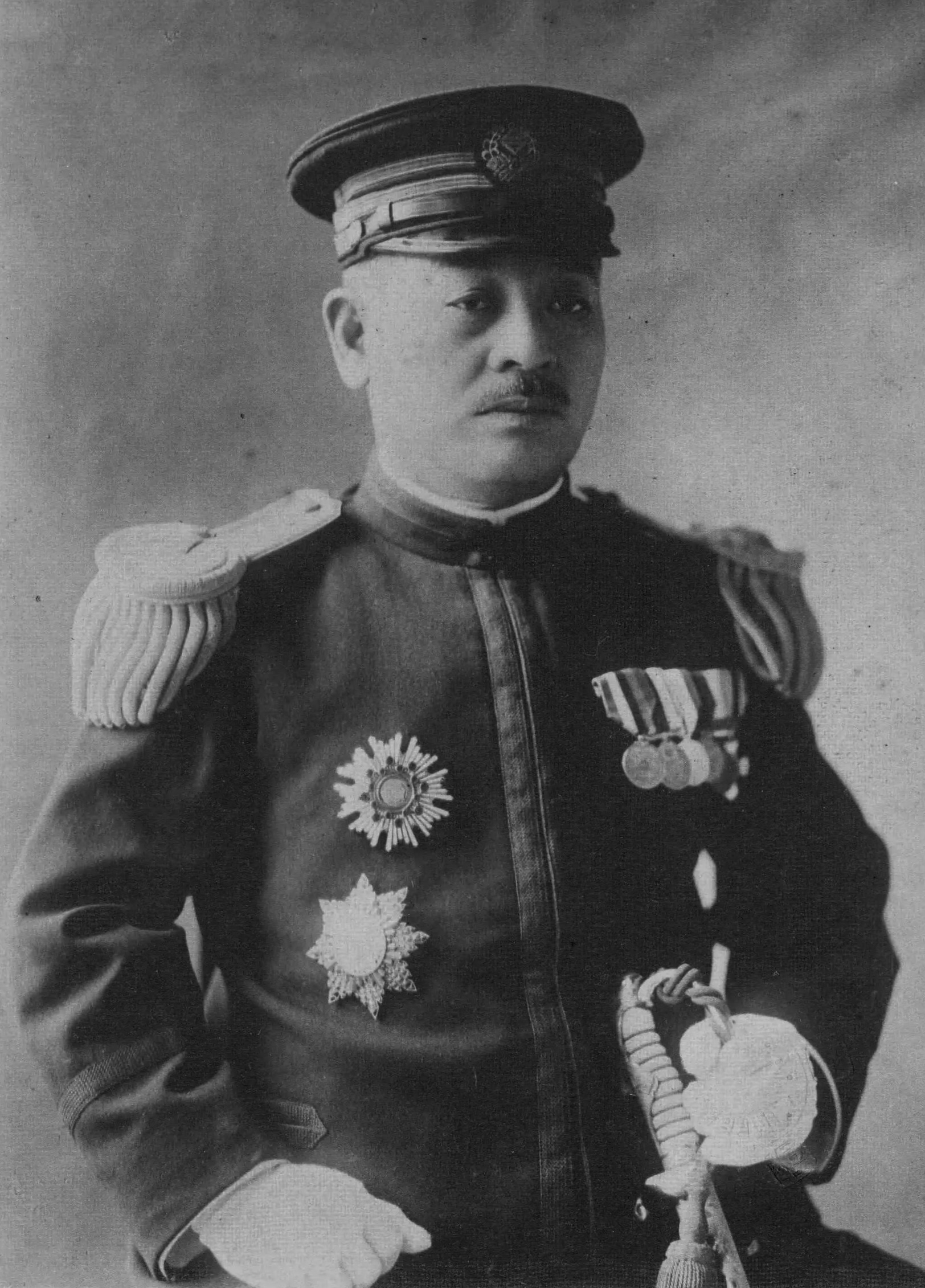

Governor-General of Taiwan
- In office 1 May 1932 – 2 September 1936
- Monarch: Shōwa
- Preceded by: Hiroshi Minami
- Succeeded by: Kobayashi Seizō

Member of the House of Peers
- In office 2 September 1936 – 26 June 1944 Nominated by the Emperor

Governor of Tokyo
- In office 5 July 1929 – 9 October 1929
- Monarch: Shōwa
- Preceded by: Hiroyoshi Hiratsuka
- Succeeded by: Torao Ushizuka

18th Director-General of the Hokkaidō Agency
- In office 16 September 1925 – 30 April 1927
- Monarchs: Taishō; Shōwa
- Preceded by: Toki Kahei
- Succeeded by: Gyūma Sawada

Governor of Kumamoto Prefecture
- In office 24 June 1924 – 16 September 1925
- Monarch: Taishō
- Preceded by: Tanaka Chisato
- Succeeded by: Satake Yoshifumi

Governor of Kagawa Prefecture
- In office 25 October 1922 – 24 June 1924
- Monarch: Taishō
- Preceded by: Sasaki Hideji
- Succeeded by: Saburō Asari

Personal details
- Born: 16 July 1875 Sannomiya, Niigata, Japan
- Died: 26 June 1944 (aged 68) Minami-Aoyama, Tokyo, Japan
- Education: Tokyo Imperial University

Kenzō Nakagawa (中川 健蔵, Nakagawa Kenzō; 16 July 1875 – 26 June 1944) was a Japanese bureaucrat and politician who served as Governor of Kagawa Prefecture, Governor of Kumamoto Prefecture, Director-General of the Hokkaidō Agency, Governor of Tokyo, Governor-General of Taiwan, and a member of the House of Peers.

== Early life and education ==
Nakagawa was born on 16 July 1875 in Sannomiya village in Sado District, Niigata Prefecture. He was born the second son of Yamamoto Denjūrō, but was later adopted into the Nakagawa family of Shinmachi in Sado and succeeded to that household.

He attended the First Higher School and graduated from the Faculty of Law of Tokyo Imperial University in 1902. In the same year he passed the higher civil service examination and entered government service.

== Career ==
After joining the bureaucracy, Nakagawa served first in the Home Ministry and the Hokkaidō administration, and later held posts in the Cabinet Legislation Bureau, the Pension Bureau, the Colonial Bureau, and the Communications Ministry. He also served as director of the South Manchuria Railway before moving into a series of senior prefectural governorships.

He became governor of Kagawa Prefecture on 25 October 1922, when he succeeded Sasaki Hideji. He later served as governor of Kumamoto Prefecture before being appointed the 18th Director-General of the Hokkaidō Agency, holding that office from 16 September 1925 to 30 April 1927.

Nakagawa subsequently became Governor of Tokyo in 1929, and then served as vice-minister of education in the Hamaguchi cabinet.

He was appointed Governor-General of Taiwan on 1 May 1932 and remained in office until 2 September 1936. He served between Hiroshi Minami and Kobayashi Seizō. During his period in Taiwan, he also served as president of the 1935 Taiwan Exposition.On 2 September 1936, Nakagawa was appointed to the House of Peers under the Imperial appointment provisions of the House of Peers Ordinance. Later, in 1939, he became president of Greater Japan Airways.

Preceded by Minami Hiroshi	Governor-General of Taiwan; 1932–1936	Succeeded by Seizō Kobayashi
