= Qi (surname 齊) =

Chinese family name

Qi (齊/齐, also commonly written as Ch’i in Wade–Giles, and Chai (Jyutping: cai4) in Cantonese) is a Chinese surname originated from the Qi (state) (齊/齐). In 2013 it was the 113th most common name, shared by 1,760,000 people or 0.130% of the population, with the province with the most being Hebei. It is the 87th name on the Hundred Family Surnames poem.

== Notable people ==
- Qi Baishi (齐白石; 齊白石), painter in the 20th century
- Chyi Yu (齊豫), singer
- Chyi Chin (齊秦), singer
- Qi Xin (齐心), mother of Xi Jinping
- Chi Po-lin (齊柏林), documentary filmmaker
- Qi Ying (齊映) (748 – 795), formally Baron Zhong of Hejian (河間忠男), was an official of the Tang Dynasty
- Qi Kerang (齊克讓) was a general of the Tang Dynasty, who was part of Tang's resistance against the major agrarian rebel Huang Chao
- Qi Xieyuan (齊燮元), Chinese warlord
- Qi Xueting (齐雪婷; born 1986) is a Chinese ice hockey player
- Qi Yaolin (齊耀琳) (1863 – ?) was a Chinese politician of the late Qing Dynasty and early period of the Republic of China. He was born in Jilin
- Qi Yaoshan (齊耀珊; 1865 - 1954), courtesy name Zhaoyan, was a statesman and government official in the Qing dynasty and Republic of China
- Qi Kang (architect), Southeast University. Qi's family is originally from Tiantai County, Zhejiang Province, China. Qi's family is descendant Qi Zhaonan (齊召南), a notable Chinese
- Qi Kang (official), (齊抗; 740 – 804), courtesy name Xiaju (遐舉), was an official of the Chinese dynasty Tang
- Chai Po Wa (齊寶華) or Qi Baohua is a table tennis player from Hong Kong
- Qi Guangpu (齐广璞; born 1990) is a Chinese aerial skier
- Pamelyn Chee (Chinese: 齐騛) a Singaporean actress.
