= 1978 in Taiwan =

- Decades: 1950s; 1960s; 1970s; 1980s; 1990s
- See also: Other events of 1978; History of Taiwan • Timeline • Years

Events in the year 1978 in Taiwan. This year is numbered Minguo 67 according to the official Republic of China calendar.

== Incumbents ==
- President – Yen Chia-kan, Chiang Ching-kuo
- Vice President – Chiang Ching-kuo, Hsieh Tung-min
- Premier – Chiang Ching-kuo, Sun Yun-suan
- Vice Premier – Hsu Ching-chung

== Events ==
=== May ===
- 20 May – Chiang Ching-kuo became the President of the Republic of China.

=== December ===
- 10 December – The commissioning of first unit of Jinshan Nuclear Power Plant in Taipei County.

== Births ==
- 1 January – Huang Chin-chih, baseball player
- 30 January – Chiang Tsu-ping, actress and television host
- 23 March – Chu Hung-sen, baseball player
- 14 May – Aimee Sun, socialite, heiress, media personality, jewelry designer, businesswoman, celebrity endorser, commercial actress and cover girl
- 7 June – Penny Lin, actress
- 14 June – Dee Hsu, television host, actress and singer
- 17 July – Suming, singer and songwriter
- 25 August – Giddens Ko, novelist and filmmaker
- 14 September – Aya Liu, actress and hostess
- 22 October – Chang Chih-chiang, baseball player
- 14 November – Liu Fu-hao, baseball player
- 26 December – Chiang Wan-an, member of Legislative Yuan, great grandson of Chiang Kai-shek

== Deaths ==
- 18 May – Wei Tao-ming, 78 former Minister of Foreign Affairs.
- 27 July – Zeng Baosun, 85, historian.
- 8 November – Chen Chih-Mai, 70, diplomat.
