= 1979 in Taiwan =

- Decades: 1950s; 1960s; 1970s; 1980s; 1990s
- See also: Other events of 1979; History of Taiwan • Timeline • Years

Events from the year 1979 in Taiwan, Republic of China. This year is numbered Minguo 68 according to the official Republic of China calendar.

== Incumbents ==
- President – Chiang Ching-kuo
- Vice President – Hsieh Tung-min
- Premier – Sun Yun-suan
- Vice Premier – Hsu Ching-chung

== Events ==
=== January ===
- 1 January:
  - The United States withdraws recognition of the Republic of China and recognizes the People's Republic of China as the sole legitimate government of "China".
  - People's Republic of China's Standing Committee of the National People's Congress published the Message to the Compatriots in Taiwan
- 11 January – The establishments of Export-Import Bank of the Republic of China.

=== February ===
- 8 February – The opening of Chongde Station and Heping Station of Taiwan Railways Administration in Xiulin Township, Hualien County.
- 26 February – Chiang Kai-shek International Airport located in Taoyuan County (now is Taoyuan County) officially opened.

=== April ===
- 4 April – United States President Jimmy Carter signs the Taiwan Relations Act into law.
- President Chiang Ching-kuo promulgated the Three Noes policy with dealing with the mainland: "no contact, no negotiation and no compromise"

=== May ===
- 17 May – The defection of Justin Yifu Lin to the People's Republic of China.

=== July ===
- 24 July – The establishment of Institute for Information Industry.

=== September ===
- 12 September – The Republic of China repeals a law mandating "closure" of the Taiwan Strait, ending blockade conditions in effect since June 1949.

=== July ===
- 1 July – Upgrade of Kaohsiung City from provincial city to special municipality.

=== December ===
- 10 December – Kaohsiung Incident in Kaohsiung.

== Births ==
- 18 January – Jay Chou, musician, singer-songwriter, multi-instrumentalist, actor and director
- 12 March – Holger Chen, Internet celebrity
- 19 March – Lu Wei-chih, golf athlete
- 4 April – Joe Chen, actress, singer and model
- 20 April – Quinn Weng, singer
- 22 April – Yang Chien-fu, baseball player
- 2 June – Huang Wen-hsing, singer and actor
- 16 July – Landy Wen, singer
- 30 July – Show Lo, singer, actor and host
- 24 August – Elva Hsiao, singer
- 15 November – Joyce Chao, actress and singer
- 5 December – Megan Lai, actress and singer
- 31 December – Hsieh Ying-hsuan, actress

== Deaths ==
- 7 March – Lei Chen, 81, politician and dissident.
- 15 June – Teruo Nakamura, 59, Taiwan-born Japanese holdout.
- 14 August – Wang Yun-wu, 91, Vice Premier (1958–1963).
- 1 September – Chang Wei-han, 92, acting President of the Control Yuan (1972–1973), Vice President of the Control Yuan (1965–1973).
