= 1954 in Taiwan =

- Decades: 1930s; 1940s; 1950s; 1960s; 1970s
- See also: Other events of 1954; History of Taiwan • Timeline • Years

Events from the year 1954 in Taiwan, Republic of China. This year is numbered Minguo 43 according to the official Republic of China calendar.

== Incumbents ==
- President – Chiang Kai-shek
- Vice President – Li Zongren, Chen Cheng
- Premier – Chen Cheng, Yu Hung-chun
- Vice Premier – Chang Li-sheng, Huang Shao-ku

== Events ==
=== March ===
- 22 March – 1954 Republic of China presidential election.

=== June ===
- 23 June – The Republic of China Navy captures the tanker Tuapse from the Soviet Union.

=== September ===
- 3 September – Start of First Taiwan Strait Crisis.

=== December ===
- 2 December – Sino-American Mutual Defense Treaty.

== Births ==
- 2 January – Hsueh Ling, member of 8th Legislative Yuan
- 24 June – Chang San-cheng, Vice Premier (2016)
- 26 July – Tsai Chen-nan, actor and singer
- 28 July – Chern Jenn-chuan, Minister of Public Construction Commission (2012–2013)
- 8 August
  - Lin Mun-lee, Director of National Palace Museum (2006–2008)
  - Mark Lee Ping-bing, cinematographer, photographer and author
- 10 September – Pan An-bang, former singer, TV presenter and actor
- 18 September – Liu Wen-hsiung, MLY (1999–2008)
- 10 November – Yang Sui-sheng, Magistrate of Lienchiang County (2009–2014)
- 15 December – Elaine Jin, actress
- Undated – Wong Sau-ching, visual artist

== Deaths ==
- 15 February – Qi Yaoshan, 88–89, Beiyang government official.
- 17 April – Uyongʉ Yata'uyungana, 45, educator and musician (execution by shooting).
- 12 May – Ding Weifen, 79, politician, Vice President of the Control Yuan (1931–1935).
- 3 November – Chen Jitang, 64, general and warlord.
- 16 December – Feng Zhi'an, 58, general.
