= Qi Kang =

Qi Kang may refer to:

- Qi Kang (official) (740–804), official of the Chinese dynasty Tang Dynasty, chancellor during the reign of Emperor Dezong
- Qi Kang (architect) (born 1931), Chinese architect and professor
