= Cigiya =

Manchu clan and family name

Manchu name
- Manchu script: ᠴᡳᡤᡳᠶᠠ

Chinese name
- Chinese: 齐佳氏
Transcriptions
Standard Mandarin
- Hanyu Pinyin: qí jiā shì

Pronunciation respelling name
- Pronunciation respelling: CHEE-ghee-yah

Cigiya is a Manchu clan and family name which was mentioned as Eight Great Manchu Surnames based on a local folk source among the Beijing Manchu Bannermen communities. The clan derived its name from Cigiya Camp (齊佳營), but the exact location today is unknown, though some members were also settled in Yehe. The clan was relatively small, consisting of only two households in its early history when joining the founding of Later Jin.

== Overview ==
During Qing dynasty, members of Cigiya clan were not particularly prominent. Only the descendants of Muhaliyan of the Plain Red Banner held hereditary titles. His son Busehe distinguished himself in campaigns in Shandong, Shanhai Pass, and Taiyuan, earning the warrior title of Baturu and being granted the hereditary rank of baitalabure hafan, later promoted to adaha hafan. His descendants continued to inherit hereditary ranks.

Following the fall of the Qing dynasty, members of the various branches of the Cigiya clan primarily adopted the Chinese surnames Qi (齊) or Qi (祁).
