= CMI =

CMI may refer to:

== Brands and enterprises ==
- C-Media Electronics, Inc., Taiwanese computer hardware company
- Chicago Musical Instruments (CMI), a manufacturer and distributor of musical instruments
- Chimei Innolux Corporation, Taiwanese TFT-LCD panel manufacturer
- Citibank Mortgage, Inc.
- CMI Gold & Silver Inc., one of the oldest precious metals bullion dealers in the United States
- Cockerill Maintenance & Ingénierie, Belgian engineering company
- Computer Memories Inc., a defunct hard disk drive manufacturer
- Continental Micronesia, Inc., ICAO code CMI, a company which was a wholly owned subsidiary of Continental Airlines
- Cummins, Inc., a manufacturer of diesel engines
- Fairlight CMI, the Fairlight Computer Musical Instrument, a digital synthesizer, sampler and digital audio workstation introduced in 1979 by Fairlight

== Computing and technology ==
- Coded mark inversion, a non-return-to-zero (NRZ) line code
- Content Management Interface, an Open Mobile Alliance enabler that provides a standardized way for content providers to interact with service providers (network operators)

== Economics and finance ==
- Chiang Mai Initiative, a multi-lateral currency swap among ASEAN+3 countries
- Credit Managers' Index, an economic indicator tracking the manufacturing and service sectors

== Healthcare ==
- Case mix index, a relative value assigned to a diagnosis-related group of patients
- Cell-mediated immunity, an immune response that does not involve antibodies but rather involves the activation of phagocytes
- Chronic Mental Illness

== Organizations and institutes ==
- Cambridge–MIT Institute, a partnership between the University of Cambridge in Cambridge, England, and the Massachusetts Institute of Technology in Cambridge, Massachusetts
- Carmelites of Mary Immaculate, a religious institute for men in the Syro-Malabar Church, founded in India
- Center for Medicare and Medicaid Innovation, an executive branch agency within Centers for Medicare and Medicaid Services
- Chartered Management Institute, professional institution for management based in the United Kingdom
- Chennai Mathematical Institute, a research and education institute in Chennai, India
- Chinese Maritime Institute, a non-profit institute based in the Taipei City, Taiwan
- Clay Mathematics Institute, a private, non-profit foundation, based in Providence, Rhode Island
- College of the Marshall Islands, a community college
- Committee for a Marxist International
- Creation Ministries International, a non-profit young Earth creationist organisation
- Crisis Management Initiative, an independent, non-governmental organisation based in Helsinki, Finland that works to resolve conflict and to build sustainable peace
- Culture and Media Institute, a conservative American non-profit organization
- Comité Maritime International

== Transportation ==
- Cimahi railway station, a railway station in Cimahi, Indonesia
- University of Illinois Willard Airport, IATA airport code

== Other uses ==
- CMi, International Astronomical Union abbreviation for the constellation Canis Minor
- 901, written CMI in Roman numerals
- Certified Master Inspector
- The Curse of Monkey Island, a video game
