= 1977 in Taiwan =

- Decades: 1950s; 1960s; 1970s; 1980s; 1990s
- See also: Other events of 1977; History of Taiwan • Timeline • Years

Events from the year 1977 in Taiwan. This year is numbered Minguo 66 according to the official Republic of China calendar.

== Incumbents ==
- President – Yen Chia-kan
- Vice President – Chiang Ching-kuo
- Premier – Chiang Ching-kuo
- Vice Premier – Hsu Ching-chung

== Events ==
=== July ===
- 9 July – President Yen Chia-kan visited Saudi Arabia.

=== August ===
- 1 August – The opening of Magong Airport in Penghu County.

== Births ==
- 24 January - Cheng Yung-jen, football player
- 1 April – Ehlo Huang, actor and singer
- 9 April – Kawlo Iyun Pacidal, member of 9th Legislative Yuan
- 20 April – Chan Yih-shin, golf athlete
- 28 April – Lawrence Ko, actor
- 29 April – Tsai Hsien-tang, football player
- 2 May – Blackie Chen, television host and basketball player
- 8 June – Dylan Kuo, actor, singer and model
- 1 July – Kao Cheng-hua, baseball player
- 31 August – Shen Po-tsang, baseball player
- 14 September – Yen Kuan-heng, member of Legislative Yuan
- 2 October – Samingad, singer
- 12 December – Cheryl Yang, actress
- 20 December – Patty Hou, former news anchor

== Deaths ==
- 9 February – Ma Buqing, 75–76, Ma clique warlord and general.
- 30 March – Tien Chung-chin, 77–78, politician, President of the Judicial Yuan (1971–1977).
- 15 May – Yang Sen, 93, general and warlord.
- 26 May – Meng Xiaodong, 68, actress.
- 22 June – Hu Lien, 69, general.
- 13 July – Thomé H. Fang, 78, philosopher.
- 30 September – Dong Zhao, 75, general.
- 30 November – Hsia Chi-ping, 68–69, general.
