= 1960 in Taiwan =

- Decades: 1940s; 1950s; 1960s; 1970s; 1980s
- See also: Other events of 1960; History of Taiwan • Timeline • Years

Events from the year 1960 in Taiwan, Republic of China. This year is numbered Minguo 49 according to the official Republic of China calendar.

== Incumbents ==
- President – Chiang Kai-shek
- Vice President – Chen Cheng
- Premier – Chen Cheng
- Vice Premier – Wang Yun-wu

== Events ==
=== January ===
- 11 January – The founding of Chi Mei Corporation.

=== February ===
- 15 February – The reorganization of Forestry Administration Division to Forestry Bureau.

=== March ===
- 29 March – The launching of National Education Radio.

=== April ===
- 13 April – The opening of the new building of Taipei Grand Mosque in Daan District, Taipei.

=== December ===
- 12 December – The establishment of National Property Administration.

== Births ==
- 12 January – Chyi Chin, singer and songwriter
- 15 January – Ku Chin-shui, decathlete and pole vaulter
- 1 April – Lee Wo-shih, Magistrate of Kinmen County (2009–2014)
- 11 April – Lee Mao-shan, singer and television host
- 2 June – Wu Shiow-ming, Chairperson of Fair Trade Commission (2009–2017)
- 9 June – Winston Chao, actor
- 10 August – Yang Ching-huang, singer and actor
- 25 August – Yen Ching-piao, member of Legislative Yuan (2002–2012)
- 31 August – Tsai Shing-hsiang, fencing athlete
- 18 November – Jiang Yi-huah, Premier of the Republic of China (2013–2014)
- 24 December – Fei Xiang, singer

== Deaths ==
- 23 May – Yan Xishan, 76, general and warlord.
- 1 June – Yu Hung-chun, 62, politician, Premier (1954–1958).
- 4 August – Chung Li-ho, 44, writer (tuberculosis).
- 25 October – Chia Ching-teh, 80, politician, Vice Premier (1949), President of the Examination Yuan (1952–1954).
