= 1976 in Taiwan =

- Decades: 1950s; 1960s; 1970s; 1980s; 1990s
- See also: Other events of 1976; History of Taiwan • Timeline • Years

Events from the year 1976 in Taiwan. This year is numbered Minguo 65 according to the official Republic of China calendar.

== Incumbents ==
- President – Yen Chia-kan
- Vice President – Chiang Ching-kuo
- Premier – Chiang Ching-kuo
- Vice Premier – Hsu Ching-chung

== Events ==
=== September ===
- 1 September – The establishment of Taiwan Institute of Economic Research.

=== October ===
- 10 October – Wang Sing-nan sent a mail bomb to Chairman of Taiwan Provincial Government Hsieh Tung-min; as a result of the explosion, Hsieh lost a hand.

=== November ===
- 27 November – The opening of Hsinchu CKS Baseball Stadium in North District, Hsinchu City.

== Births ==
- 24 March – Kuo Yi-feng, baseball player
- 5 April – Su Chiao-hui, member of Legislative Yuan
- 16 April – Shu Qi, actress
- 24 July – Chiang Peng-lung, table tennis player
- 7 September – Wang Jing-li, baseball player
- 22 September – Hsiao Huang-chi, singer, songwriter and judo athlete
- 6 October – Barbie Hsu, actress and singer (d. 2025)
- 14 October – Chang Chen, actor
- 16 October – Huang Chih-hsiung, member of 6th, 7th and 8th Legislative Yuan
- 24 October – Yang Shih-kuang, television presenter
- 27 October – Chen Chih-yuan, former professional baseball player
- 31 October – Chang Tai-shan, professional baseball player
- 28 November – Monster, guitarist
- 4 December – Joelle Lu, actress

== Deaths ==
- 13 February – Liao Chi-chun, 74, painter and sculptor.
- 12 May – Yu Jiaju, 78, educator, co-founder of the Young China Party.
- 1 July – Kwang Pu Chen, 94, banker.
- 7 October – Wu Chuo-liu, 76, novelist and journalist.
