= 1962 in Taiwan =

- Decades: 1940s; 1950s; 1960s; 1970s; 1980s
- See also: Other events of 1962; History of Taiwan • Timeline • Years

Events in the year 1962 in Taiwan, Republic of China. This year is numbered Minguo 51 according to the official Republic of China calendar.

== Incumbents ==
- President – Chiang Kai-shek
- Vice President – Chen Cheng
- Premier – Chen Cheng
- Vice Premier – Wang Yun-wu

== Events ==
=== April ===
- 1 April – The upgrade of Sanchong from an urban township to a county-administered city.
- 28 April – The establishment of TTV Main Channel.

=== May ===
- 16 May – The opening of Hualien Airport in Hualien County.

=== July ===
- 11 July – The establishment of China Maritime Institute.

=== October ===
- 10 October – The official launch of TTV Main Channel.

== Births ==
- 22 February – Lin Tsung-hsien, Magistrate of Yilan County (2009–2017)
- 17 March – Lin Hsi-shan, Secretary-General of Executive Yuan (1999–2016)
- 20 March – Kuo Tai-yuan, baseball player
- 8 May – Fu Kun-chi, Magistrate of Hualien County (2009–2018)
- 27 July – Vanessa Shih, Vice Minister of Foreign Affairs (2012–2016)
- 10 October – Tou Chung-hua, actor
- 25 October - Tsai Hsiao-hu, singer
- 28 November – Pan Wen-chung, Minister of Education (2016–2018)

== Deaths ==
- 14 February – Hu Zongnan, 65, general.
- 24 February – Hu Shih, 70, politician and writer, Minister of Foreign Affairs (1949), President of Academia Sinica (1957-1962).
- 19 May – Mei Yiqi, 72, politician, physicist and educator, Minister of Education (1948–1949, 1958–1961).
