= Dong Zhao =

Dong Zhao may refer to:

- Dong Zhao (Three Kingdoms), (156–236), minister who served under the Kingdom of Wei
- Dong Zhao (Kuomintang), KMT general from Shaanxi
