= 1980 in Taiwan =

- Decades: 1960s; 1970s; 1980s; 1990s; 2000s
- See also: Other events of 1980; History of Taiwan • Timeline • Years

Events from the year 1980 in Taiwan, Republic of China. This year is numbered Minguo 69 according to the official Republic of China calendar.

== Incumbents ==
- President – Chiang Ching-kuo
- Vice President – Hsieh Tung-min
- Premier – Sun Yun-suan
- Vice Premier – Hsu Ching-chung

== Events ==
=== February ===
- 1 February – The opening of Dong-ao Station, Hanben Station and Wuta Station of Taiwan Railways Administration in Nan'ao Township, Yilan County.

=== April ===
- 5 April – The opening of Chiang Kai-shek Memorial Hall in Zhongzheng District, Taipei City.

=== July ===
- 16 July – The establishment of Central Election Commission of the Republic of China.

=== November ===
- 12 November – The establishment of National Sun Yat-sen University in Gushan District, Kaohsiung City.

=== December ===
- 6 December – 1980 National Assembly and legislative election.

== Births ==
- 23 February – Shih Pei-chun, judo athlete.
- 7 March – Amy Hung, professional golfer.
- 9 March – Kelly Huang, actress.
- 5 May – Kingone Wang, actor, singer and host.
- 6 May – Chang Chih-chia, baseball player.
- 13 June – Jocelyn Wang, actress.
- 9 July – Lee Wei, actor and singer.
- 24 July – Kao Hao-chieh, football player.
- 27 July – Chang Chien-ming, baseball player.
- 14 August – Maggie Chiang, singer and songwriter.
- 15 September – Jolin Tsai, singer and dancer.
- 29 September – Ady An, singer and actress.
- 22 October – Sonia Sui, model and actress.
- 10 November – Calvin Chen, singer and actor.
