= 1963 in Taiwan =

- Decades: 1940s; 1950s; 1960s; 1970s; 1980s
- See also: Other events of 1963; History of Taiwan • Timeline • Years

Events in the year 1963 in Taiwan, Republic of China. This year is numbered Minguo 52 according to the official Republic of China calendar.

== Incumbents ==
- President – Chiang Kai-shek
- Vice President – Chen Cheng
- Premier – Chen Cheng, Yen Chia-kan
- Vice Premier – Wang Yun-wu, Yu Ching-tang

== Events ==
=== January ===
- 11 January – The opening of Taipei Prison in Taoyuan County (now Taoyuan City).

=== February ===
- 13 February – The 7.3 M_{w} Su-ao earthquake occurred off the coast of Yilan County, causing some injuries and deaths.

=== September ===
- 1 September – The declaration of Port of Hualien to be an international port.

=== October ===
- 22 October – The establishment of National Research Institute of Chinese Medicine in Beitou District, Taipei.

== Births ==
- 24 February – Wu Chi-ming, member of Legislative Yuan
- 26 February – Lu Wen-teh, golf athlete
- 12 March – Kuang Li-chen, Magistrate of Taitung County
- 18 March – Wei Ming-ku, Magistrate of Changhua County
- 3 June – Chen Fu-hai, Magistrate of Kinmen County
- 21 June – Tiger Huang, singer
- 8 August – Yang Tzu-pao, Deputy Minister of Culture
- 10 August – Lee Chia-fen, educator and politician
- 14 September – Chu Chin-peng, Minister of Research, Development and Evaluation Commission (2009–2012)
- 26 September – Huang Wei-cher, Mayor of Tainan
- 21 October – Hsieh Chen-wu, lawyer and presenter
- 6 November – Chang Hsien-yao, Deputy Minister of Mainland Affairs Council (2014)
- 14 November – Tuan Yi-kang, member of 5th, 8th and 9th Legislative Yuan

== Deaths ==
- 3 January – Zhu Jiahua, 69, politician, Vice Premier of the Republic of China (1949–1950).
- 12 January – Pang Bingxun, 83, general.
- 24 January – Yin Chung-jung, 59, government official, Minister of Economic Affairs (1954–1955).
- 28 May – Chen Chih-hsiung, 47, independence activist (execution by shooting).
- 7 September – Qin Dechun, 69, general.
- 18 November – Puru, 67, painter and calligrapher.
- 23 November – Dong Zuobin, 68, archaeologist.
