= 1958 in Taiwan =

- Decades: 1930s; 1940s; 1950s; 1960s; 1970s
- See also: Other events of 1958; History of Taiwan • Timeline • Years

Events from the year 1958 in Taiwan, Republic of China. This year is numbered Minguo 47 according to the official Republic of China calendar.

== Incumbents ==
- President – Chiang Kai-shek
- Vice President – Chen Cheng
- Premier – Yu Hung-Chun, Chen Cheng
- Vice Premier – Huang Shao-ku, Wang Yun-wu

== Events ==
=== August ===
- 23 August – Start of Second Taiwan Strait Crisis.

=== September ===
- 22 September – End of Second Taiwan Strait Crisis.

=== October ===
- 25 October – Mao Zedong issued a document through the Ministry of National Defense of PRC, Mao said,”There is only one China in the world and no two in China. We are consistent with this point. The Americans are compelled to create two Chinese tricks. The entire Chinese people, including you and overseas Chinese, are absolutely not allowed to realize them.”(s:中華人民共和國國防部再告台灣同胞書)

== Births ==
- 1 February – Lee Shu-chuan, Deputy Mayor of Kaohsiung
- 11 March – Chou Hsi-wei, Magistrate of Taipei County (2005–2010)
- 25 March – Sisy Chen, politician
- 4 May – Sibelle Hu, former actress and singer
- 14 May – Sarah Chen, singer
- 20 June – Lee Wen-chung, Deputy Minister of Veterans Affairs Council
- 10 July – Ho Min-hao, member of Legislative Yuan
- 10 August – Wang Mei-hua, Vice Minister of Economic Affairs
- 24 August – Liu Cheng-ying, Magistrate of Lienchiang County
- 14 September – James C. F. Huang, Minister of Foreign Affairs (2006–2008)
- 23 September – Lin Chung-chiu, baseball player
- 31 October – Wellington Koo, Chairperson of Financial Supervisory Commission

== Deaths ==
- 15 March – Wang Chonghui, 76, Premier (1922).
- 26 August – Ji Xingwen, 51, general (killed in action during the Second Taiwan Strait Crisis).
- 28 September – Hung Lan-yu, 57–58, politician, secretary-general of the National Assembly (1947–1958).
