= Premier Yu =

Premier Yu may refer to:

- Yu Hung-chun (born 1948), 6th premier of the Republic of China
- Yu Kuo-hwa (1842–1922), 11th premier of the Republic of China

== Others ==
- You Si-kun (1842–1922), also romanized Yu Shyi-kun, 18th premier of the Republic of China
