= Yu Di (Tang dynasty) =

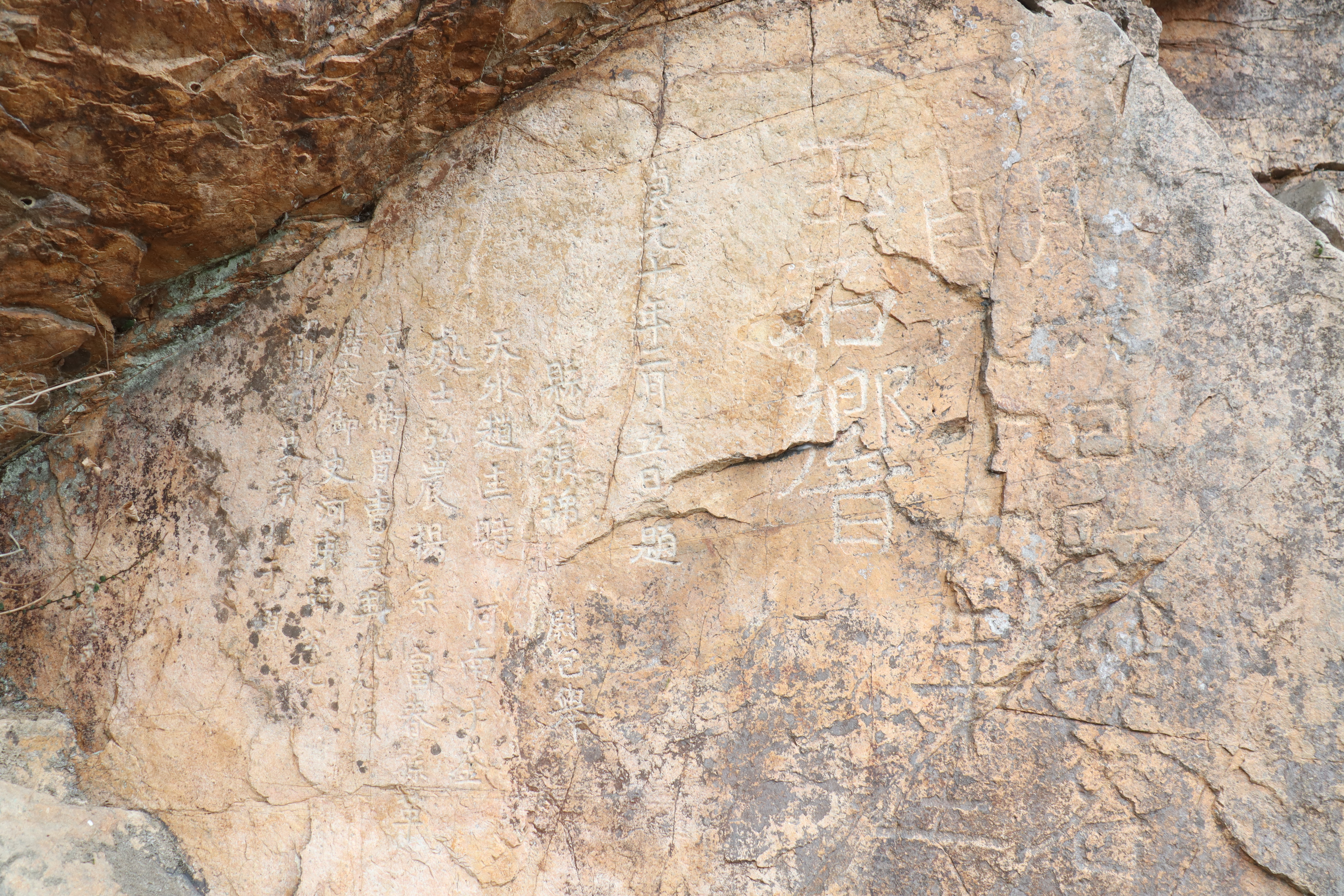
Inscription by Yu Di and his escorts, Tenth year of Zhenyuan, 794 AD. Located in Xialongtan, Xiangying Mountain, Deqing County. It is now the county's cultural relics protection unit.

Yu Di (于頔; died 818), courtesy name Yunyuan (允元), formally initially Duke Li of Yan (燕厲公) and later Duke Si of Yan (燕思公), was a Chinese diplomat, military general, politician, and warlord during the Tang dynasty. He was a powerful warlord at the end of the reign of Emperor Dezong but submitted to imperial authority during the reign of Emperor Dezong's grandson Emperor Xianzong.

== Background and early career ==
It is not known when Yu Di was born, but it is known that his family was from Henan Municipality (河南, i.e., the region of the Tang dynasty eastern capital Luoyang). His family traced its ancestry to the prominent Xianbei clan Moniuyu (万鈕于) of Northern Wei, which changed its name to Yu when Emperor Xiaowen of Northern Wei had the Xianbei clans' names changed to Han names. Among Yu Di's ancestors were generals and officials of Northern Wei, Western Wei, Northern Zhou, Sui dynasty, and Tang, including the prominent Northern Zhou general Yu Jin. Yu Di's grandfather Yu Wang (于汪) served as the director of the archival bureau, while his father Yu Xiong (于敻) served as a military advisor to a prefectural prefect.

It was said that because of his heritage, Yu Di was made an imperial guard officer at the start of his official career, and then as the sheriff of Huayin County (華陰, in modern Weinan, Shaanxi). The surveyor of the circuit, Liu Wan (劉灣), later invited him to serve as assistant; yet later, while he was serving as the secretary general of Yueyang County (櫟陽, in modern Xi'an, Shaanxi), he served under the senior official Zhang Yi at a treaty signing with the Tibetan Empire. Thereafter, he served as Simen Yuanwailang (司門員外郎), a low-level official at the ministry of justice (刑部, Xingbu), as well as Shiyushi (侍御史), a low-level imperial censor. He later again served on a diplomatic mission with the Tibetan Empire, and was said to have served well and been highly regarded as a result. He later served as the magistrate of Chang'an County (one of the two counties making up the Tang capital Chang'an) and then as Jiabu Langzhong (駕部郎中), a supervisorial official at the ministry of rites (禮部, Libu).

Later, he was sent out of Chang'an to serve as the prefect of Hu Prefecture (湖州, in modern Huzhou, Zhejiang). Within his territory was a lake that, during the time of the Southern dynasties, provided irrigation water for a large area, but which since then had become abandoned. Yu ordered that its reconstruction be carried out, and thereafter, the people received not only the benefits of irrigation but also of fishing. As the prefecture did not have much usable land, many human corpses went unburied, and Yu established more than 10 burial sites for the bodies. He later served as the prefect of Su Prefecture (蘇州, in modern Suzhou, Jiangsu), and it was said that the irrigation ditches and the streets that he constructed were still heavily relied upon at the time that the Old Book of Tang was written—i.e., during Later Jin. Believing that there were too many odd temples in his territory, he had them destroyed, leaving only the temples of Taibo of Wu and Wu Zixu. However, while Yu was said to be able as a prefect, he was also said to be cruel and unreasonable at times, often caning people, particularly when he was at Hu Prefecture. His superior, the circuit governor (觀察使, Guanchashi) Wang Wei (王緯) reported this to then-reigning Emperor Dezong, but Emperor Dezong took no actions against Yu. (After Yu was later promoted several times, he wrote a letter to Wang to brag, "After I received your poor comments, I was promoted three times.") Yu was later promoted to be Dali Qing (大理卿), the chief judge of the superior court, and yet later served as the governor of Shan'guo Circuit (陝虢, headquartered in modern Sanmenxia, Henan). As he believed that he was becoming powerful, he was further abusing his power and being cruel, punishing many of his subordinates daily with heavy punishments. On one occasion, a secretary, Yao Xian (姚峴), becoming distressed over Yu's cruelty, jumped into a river (probably Yellow River) to his death while rowing on the river with his brother.

== As Jiedushi of Shannan East Circuit ==
In 798, Yu Di was made the military governor of Shannan East Circuit (山南東道, headquartered in modern Xiangfan, Hubei) and the prefect of its capital Xiang Prefecture (襄州). Shortly thereafter, Wu Shaocheng the military governor of Zhangyi Circuit (彰義, headquartered in modern Zhumadian, Henan), whose circuit bordered Yu's, rebelled against Emperor Dezong's authority, and Yu was one of the generals commissioned to attack Wu. In 799, Yu captured two counties from Wu—Wufang (吳房) and Langshan (朗山) (both in modern Zhumadian).

Thereafter, however, Yu grew arrogant, and it was said that he recruited more soldiers and acted as if the land south of the Han River was all his domain. It was also said that he killed people at will. As Emperor Dezong was more interested in appeasing the regional governors at the time, he acted as Yu requested, including promoting Xiang Prefecture's status into one where a commandant would be stationed, just as the capital of two other circuits ruled by warlords ruling their realms independently from the imperial government—Yun Prefecture (鄆州, in modern Tai'an, Shandong), the capital of Pinglu Circuit (平盧), then ruled by Li Shigu; and Wei Prefecture (魏州, in modern Handan, Hebei), the capital of Weibo Circuit (魏博), then ruled by Tian Xu. On one occasion, he falsely accused his subordinate Yuan Hong (元洪) the prefect of Deng Prefecture (鄧州, in modern Nanyang, Henan) of corruption. After Emperor Dezong ordered that Yuan be exiled to Duan Prefecture (端州, in modern Zhaoqing, Guangdong), Yu seized Yuan from the eunuch sent to escort Yuan to exile, forcing the eunuch to flee back to Chang'an, and then submitted a petition complaining that Yuan was punished too harshly, and only after Emperor Dezong changed the punishment to demotion to be the secretary general of Ji Prefecture (吉州, in modern Ji'an, Jiangxi) did Yu allow Yuan to leave. On another occasion, when Yu became angry with his assistant Xue Zhenglun (薛正倫), he requested Emperor Dezong to demote Xue to be the secretary general of Xia Prefecture (峽州, in modern Yichang, Hubei), but after Emperor Dezong issued the edict, Yu was no longer angry with Xue by that point, and submitted another petition to keep Xue as assistant. Emperor Dezong agreed with that request as well. After Xue died and before Xue was buried, Yu had soldiers surround Xue's house and forced Xue's daughter to marry Yu's son born of a concubine. While Yu served at Shannan East Circuit, he was eventually created the Duke of Yan and, in 805, after Emperor Dezong's grandson Emperor Xianzong became emperor, Yu was given the honorary chancellor title of Tong Zhongshu Menxia Pingzhangshi (同中書門下平章事). It was also said that he, without imperial permission, stationed troops at the important city of Nanyang, causing the imperial government such distress.

With Emperor Xianzong carrying out campaigns to reassert imperial power, Yu became apprehensive, and in or just before 807, he requested that a princess be married to his son Yu Jiyou (于季友). The imperial scholar Li Jiang opposed on the grounds that Yu Di was from Xianbei ancestry and that Yu Jiyou was not even born of Yu Di's wife but of a concubine. Emperor Xianzong, however, saw the advantages of agreeing to the proposal. Around the new year 808, Emperor Xianzong married his daughter Princess Puning to You Jiyou and sent much dowry with her. This surprised Yu Di, who was very pleased. Shortly after, Emperor Xianzong had other officials hint to Yu that he should personally pay homage to the emperor to thank him, a suggestion echoed by Yu Di's son Yu Fang (于方). When Yu Di went to Chang'an to pay homage to Emperor Xianzong later in 808, he was made Sikong (司空) and chancellor, and kept at Chang'an; he was replaced as the military governor of Shannan East Circuit by Pei Jun (裴均). almost to the time he became king

== After return to Chang'an ==
However, it appeared that Yu Di did not exercise much actual chancellor responsibility, as, per the precedent of Du You, he only attended imperial meetings three times a month. Further, when he suggested to Emperor Xianzong that harsher punishments be instituted, Emperor Xianzong did not accept the proposal and further, in discussion with other chancellors, referred to Yu as being evil in submitting the proposal and wanting him to lose the hearts of the people.

Yu Di was not happy serving in this manner. In or shortly before 813, there was a man named Liang Zhengyan (梁正言) who claimed to be a close relative of the powerful eunuch Liang Shouqian (梁守謙), and Yu had his son Yu Min (于敏) bribe Liang Zhengyan, seeking to be made a military governor again. However, at a later point, Liang Zhengyan was revealed to be a fraud, and Yu Min demanded the return of the bribe, which Liang Zhengyan refused. In anger, Yu Min trapped Liang Zhengyan's servant by trick, and killed and dismembered the servant. When this was discovered, Yu Di and Yu Jiyou went to the palace gate in mourning clothes to seek mercy, but the palace guards refused to let him meet the emperor. He was subsequently demoted to be the assistant to Emperor Xianzong's granduncle Li Lian (李連) the Prince of En, and he was denied further access to the emperor's presence. Yu Min was exiled to Lei Prefecture (雷州, in modern Zhanjiang, Guangdong), while Yu Di's other sons were all demoted in rank. On the way to exile, Yu Min was ordered to commit suicide, while Liang Zhengyan and his associate, the Buddhist monk Jianxu (鑒虛) were executed. Later that year, Yu Di was elevated to the higher position of Taizi Binke (太子賓客), an advisor to Emperor Xianzong's crown prince Li Heng.

In 815, when Emperor Xianzong was conducting a campaign against Zhangyi, then ruled by Wu Yuanji (whose father Wu Shaoyang was not related by blood to Wu Shaocheng but was regarded as a cousin), many generals submitted their wealth to support the campaign. When Yu tried to submit a large amount of silver and gold, however, Emperor Xianzong refused to accept his submission. Subsequently, when Yu Jiyou was accused of lack of filial piety as he continued to feast when Yu Di's wife (not his mother) died, Yu Di was stripped of his honorific title of Jinzi Guanglu Daifu (金紫光祿大夫) as he was considered to have failed to educate Yu Jiyou properly. In 818, Yu requested retirement, and traditionally, when an official sought retirement, he would be allowed to retire at a greater position than he actually held. The chancellors thus proposed giving him the greater position of Taizi Shaobao (太子少保)—also advisor to the crown prince, but at higher position. Emperor Xianzong disapproved and had him retire as Taizi Binke. He died later that year and was given posthumous honors but the posthumous name Li (厲, "cruel"). After Emperor Xianzong's death and succession by Li Heng (as Emperor Muzong) in 820, Yu Jiyou, on an occasion when he attended a hunt with Emperor Muzong, pleaded with Emperor Muzong to give his father a more honorable posthumous name. Many officials opposed such a request, but Emperor Muzong eventually gave Yu Di the posthumous name of Si (思, "repentant").

== Notes and references ==
- Old Book of Tang, vol. 156.
- New Book of Tang, vol. 172.
- Zizhi Tongjian, vols. 235, 236, 238, 239.
