= Zhang Yi (Tang dynasty) =

Chinese historian, military general and politician

Zhang Yi (Chinese: 張鎰; died November 8, 783), courtesy names Jiquan (季權) and Gongdu (公度), was a Chinese historian, military general, and politician of the Tang dynasty, briefly serving as a chancellor during the reign of Emperor Dezong.

== Background ==
It is not known when Zhang Yi was born, but it is known that his family was from Su Prefecture (蘇州, in modern Suzhou, Jiangsu). His family traced its ancestry to officials of the Spring and Autumn period state Jin, the Warring States period state Han, Han dynasty, Southern Qi, Liang dynasty, Sui dynasty, and Tang dynasty. His great-great-grandfather Zhang Houyin (張後胤) was a principal of the imperial university early in Tang and carried the title of Duke of Xinye. His grandfather Zhang Lüshi (張律師) served as an advisor to an imperial prince. His grandfather Zhang Yifang (張義方) served as a prefectural prefect. His father Zhang Qiqiu (張齊丘) was a military governor (Jiedushi) of Shuofang Circuit (朔方, headquartered in modern Yinchuan, Ningxia).

== During Emperors Suzong's and Daizong's reigns ==
Due to Zhang Yi's father Zhang Qiqiu's status, he was made an officer of the imperial guards early in his career. When the major general Guo Ziyi served as the deputy supreme commander of armed forces in the Guannei Region (關內, i.e., the region around the capital Chang'an), because Guo had previously served under Zhang Qiqiu, he invited Zhang Yi to serve as his secretary. He later served as Dali Pingshi (大理評事), a judge at the supreme court, and then as Dianzhong Shiyushi (殿中侍御史), an imperial censor. During Emperor Suzong's Qianyuan era (758-760), there was an incident when a county magistrate, Lu Cong (盧樅), rebuked his subordinate Qi Lingshen (齊令詵), and Qi, as payback, made false accusations against Lu. Zhang was put in charge of the investigation against Lu, and he suggested that Lu be demoted — but after he made his reports to his superiors, they decided that Lu should be executed by caning. Zhang, believing this to be unjust, put on his official uniform and told his mother:

If I submit a petition in Lu Cong's defense, Lu will not be executed, but I will surely be demoted. If I watch out for my personal interest, then I am not carrying out my duties as an official. If I am demoted, then I will worry you, Lady. What should I do?

Zhang's mother responded: "If you are doing the right thing, then I will not worry." Zhang thus submitted a petition in Lu's defense, and Lu was not executed but exiled. Zhang himself was demoted to be the census officer of Fu Prefecture (撫州, in modern Fuzhou, Jiangxi). He was later made the magistrate of Jinling County (晉陵, in modern Changzhou, Jiangsu), but before he could report to Jinling, Zhang Gao, the governor of Jiangnan West Circuit (江南西道, headquartered in modern Nanchang, Jiangxi), invited him to serve as a secretary. Zhang Yi later was recalled to Chang'an, and he successively served as Tuntian Yuanwailang (屯田員外郎), a low-level official at the ministry of public works (工部, Gongbu); Cibu Yuanwailang (祠部員外郎), a low-level official at the ministry of rites (禮部, Lǐbu); and Yousi Yuanwailang (右司員外郎), an assistant to one of the secretaries general of the executive bureau of government (尚書省, Shangshu Sheng). When his mother died, he observed a period of mourning for her, and after the mourning period was over, he was made Sixun Yuanwailang (司勳員外郎), a low-level official at the ministry of civil service affairs (吏部, Lìbu, note different tone than the ministry of rites). It was said that he chose his friends carefully and did not associate with many people, and was particularly friendly with Yang Guan and Cui Youfu.

In 770, during the reign of Emperor Suzong's son Emperor Daizong, Zhang Yi was made the prefect of Bo Prefecture (濠州, in modern Chuzhou, Anhui). It was said that he ruled the prefecture effectively, and he invited scholars to teach the students of the prefecture. During his term of service, as a result, over 40 people from the prefecture passed the imperial examinations. He also authored a number of commentaries on the Three Rites (i.e., the Classic of Rites, the Rites of Zhou, and the Yili "Etiquette and Rites"), the Five Classics, and the Mencius. When the army officer Li Lingyao (李靈曜) rebelled at Biansong Circuit (汴宋, headquartered in modern Kaifeng, Henan) in 776, Zhang trained the militia and defended the prefecture carefully, drawing Emperor Daizong's praise. He was given the defender of the Huai River region (沿淮鎮守使, Yanhuai Zhenshoushi). He was soon made the prefect of Shou Prefecture (壽州, in modern Lu'an, Anhui), and continued to carry the title of defender of the Huai River Region.

== During Emperor Dezong's reign ==
Emperor Daizong died in 779 and was succeeded by his son Emperor Dezong. He made Zhang Yi the governor of Jiangnan West Circuit and the prefect of its capital Hong Prefecture (洪州). Later, he recalled Zhang to serve as the deputy minister of civil services affairs (吏部侍郎, Libu Shilang). He later made Zhang the governor of Hezhong Circuit (河中, headquartered in modern Yuncheng, Shanxi), but after just a few days made Zhang the military governor of Yongping Circuit (永平, headquartered in modern Kaifeng) instead. Claiming an illness, Zhang never reported to Yongping Circuit. He was allowed to return to Chang'an to recover from illness at his mansion. In 780, when the chancellor Yang Yan was removed from his post, Emperor Dezong made Zhang Zhongshu Shilang (中書侍郎), the deputy head of the legislative bureau (中書省, Zhongshu Sheng), and gave him the designation Tong Zhongshu Menxia Pingzhangshi (同中書門下平章事), making him a chancellor de facto.

Zhang Yi's chancellor colleague Lu Qi, however, was trusted by Emperor Dezong and was far more powerful than Zhang himself was. For example, later in the year, when Li Wei (李洧) the prefect of Xu Prefecture (徐州, in modern Xuzhou, Jiangsu), was ready to submit to imperial authority and turn against his relative, Li Na, who was resisting imperial authority and ruling Pinglu Circuit (平盧, headquartered in modern Tai'an, Shandong) independently after Emperor Dezong denied him permission to succeed his father Li Zhengji. Li Wei sent his assistant Cui Cheng (崔程) to Chang'an to report on Li Wei's submission and suggested that if Emperor Dezong publicly made him the governor of, in addition to Xu, two other prefectures nearby, that those prefectures would also follow his call to return to imperial authority. When Cui arrived at Chang'an, however, not understanding the power balance between the chancellors, he reported to Zhang rather than Lu. Even though Zhang relayed the report to Lu, Lu was still angered, and Li Wei's proposal was rejected. Subsequently, the imperial government was only able to recover Xu Prefecture.

In 782, Zhao Zong (趙縱), the minister of husbandry and a son-in-law to Guo Ziyi (who had died in 781), was accused by his own eunuch Dangqian (當千) of improprieties. Zhao was arrested and detained at the bureau of censors, while Emperor Dezong kept Dangqian as an imperial servant at the bureau of eunuchs. Zhang submitted a lengthy petition, pointing out that it was troubling that Zhang was being arrested based on accusation of a servant and that he was the third son-in-law of Guo's to be accused of crimes within a short period after Guo's death. As a result, Emperor Dezong only demoted Zhao and put Dangqian to death for betraying his master. Zhang took Dangqian's body and displayed it to all of the servants of the Guo household as a warning.

Zhang was respected by Emperor Dezong, and Lu became jealous of this, and he wanted to remove Zhang from his chancellor position. Later in 782, when Emperor Dezong removed Zhu Ci the military governor of Fengxiang Circuit (鳳翔, headquartered in modern Baoji, Shaanxi) from his post because Zhu Ci's brother Zhu Tao the acting military governor of Lulong Circuit (盧龍, headquartered in modern Beijing), had rebelled against imperial authority, Lu stated that due to Fengxiang's importance, Zhu Ci needed to be succeeded by a chancellor, and offered to take the position himself. When Emperor Dezong hesitated, Lu, who was ugly in appearance, immediately stated that he understood Emperor Dezong's hesitation that because of his ugliness he might not be able to gain the respect of the army, and requested that someone else be sent. Emperor Dezong thus made Zhang the military governor of Fengxiang Circuit and the mayor of Fengxiang Municipality, and Zhang continued to carry a chancellor designation as an honorary designation.

In 783, by Emperor Dezong's orders, Zhang and the Tufan chancellor Nanam Shang Gyaltsen Lhanang ("Shang Jiezan" (尚結贊) in Chinese) swore an oath of friendship between the two states. In the solemn ceremony, Zhang and six of his staff members — among whom were future chancellors Qi Ying, Qi Kang, and Yu Di — served as administrators of the oath on the Tang side, while Shang and six of key Tufan officials and generals served as administrators of the oath on the Tufan side. Zhang was, however, ashamed of having to swear an oath with someone that he saw as a barbarian, and he wanted to reduce the solemnity of the oath. Originally, the oath was to be accompanied by sacrifices of horses and cattle. Zhang requested that sheep, pigs, and dogs be substituted, but as pigs could not be found in the locale, at Shang's suggestion, goats were substituted instead.

It was said that while Zhang was serving as the military governor of Fengxiang, he was not well-acquainted with military matters, and spent much time on personal appearance. On November 2, 783, soldiers from Jingyuan Circuit (涇原, headquartered in modern Pingliang, Gansu), at Chang'an to await deployment to the east against warlords, mutinied when they did not receive rewards they felt they deserved. Emperor Dezong fled to Fengtian (奉天, in modern Xianyang, Shaanxi), but as Fengtian was a small city, considered further heading to Fengxiang. The soldiers supported Zhu Ci as their leader, and Zhu Ci initially postured that he would calm the people of Chang'an and then welcome Emperor Dezong back to Chang'an. Meanwhile, Zhang, hearing of the mutiny and of Emperor Dezong's considering visiting Fengxiang, began undertaking preparations for the emperor's arrival. Qi Ying and Qi Kang pointed out that one of the military officers, Li Chulin (李楚琳), was previously a subordinate of Zhu Ci's and would be difficult to control. Zhang thus issued an order that Li Chulin report to Long Prefecture (隴州, in modern Baoji). Li Chulin, giving excuses, did not report immediately, and Zhang, concentrating on welcoming the emperor, never followed up on whether Li Chulin left for Long Prefecture. The night of November 8, Li Chulin and his associates mutinied and attacked Zhang's headquarters. Zhang and two of his sons climbed over the city walls and tried to flee, but were captured by the mutineers and killed. He was posthumously honored by Emperor Dezong.

== Notes and references ==
- Old Book of Tang, vol. 125.
- New Book of Tang, vol. 152.
- Zizhi Tongjian, vols. 227, 228.
