= 1975 in Taiwan =

- Decades: 1950s; 1960s; 1970s; 1980s; 1990s
- See also: Other events of 1975; History of Taiwan • Timeline • Years

Events from the year 1975 in Taiwan, Republic of China. This year is numbered Minguo 64 according to the official Republic of China calendar.

== Incumbents ==
- President – Chiang Kai-shek, Yen Chia-kan
- Vice President – Yen Chia-kan, Chiang Ching-kuo
- Premier – Chiang Ching-kuo
- Vice Premier – Hsu Ching-chung

== Events ==
=== February ===
- 10 February – The opening of Chinese Culture and Movie Center in Taipei.

=== April ===
- 5 April – President Chiang Kai-shek died in age 87, Yen Chia-kan became the President of the Republic of China.

=== July ===
- 8 July – The establishment of diplomatic relations with Paraguay.
- 26 July – The opening of Beipu Station of Taiwan Railways Administration in Xincheng Township, Hualien County.

=== December ===
- 20 December – 1975 Republic of China legislative election.

== Births ==
- 28 February – A-Sun, singer and songwriter
- 19 March – Vivian Hsu, singer, actress and model
- 9 May – Weng Li-you, pop singer
- 27 May – Lin Chih-chien, Mayor of Hsinchu City
- 6 June – Cheer Chen, singer and songwriter
- 9 June – Serina Liu, actress (d. 2020)
- 1 July – Kung Tsui-chang, Duke Yansheng
- 5 October – Hsieh Kuo-liang, member of 6th, 7th and 8th Legislative Yuan
- 15 October – Hsu Shu-hua, member of Legislative Yuan
- 5 December – Laha Mebow, writer, producer and director
- 10 December – Hsing Hui, actress

== Deaths ==
- 17 January – Chang Chin-lan, 57, judge, justice on the Supreme Court, judge of the Judicial Yuan.
- 26 February – Li Hsi-mou, 78, former President of Taiwan Provincial Museum
- 5 April – Chiang Kai-shek, 87, President (1950–1975)
- 28 April, Liu Ruming, 79, general.
- 23 December – Chen Pao-pei, 40–41, table tennis player.
