= 1964 in Taiwan =

- Decades: 1940s; 1950s; 1960s; 1970s; 1980s
- See also: Other events of 1964; History of Taiwan • Timeline • Years

Events from the year 1964 in Taiwan, Republic of China. This year is numbered Minguo 53 according to the official Republic of China calendar.

== Incumbents ==
- President – Chiang Kai-shek
- Vice President – Chen Cheng
- Premier – Yen Chia-kan
- Vice Premier – Yu Ching-tang

== Events ==
=== January ===
- 18 January – The 6.3 M_{L} Baihe earthquake occurred in Tainan County.

=== March ===
- 1 March – The founding of Free China Weekly.

=== July ===
- 1 July – The establishment of Yunlin District Prosecutors Office in Yunlin County.

=== August ===
- 3 August – The opening of Taipei City Council new venue at the corner of Zhongxiao West Road and Zhongshan South Road from the former Zhongshan Hall.

=== October ===
- 25 October – The founding of Taiwan Daily.

== Births ==
- 1 January – Chang Li-shan, Magistrate of Yunlin County.
- 13 February – Lin Chia-lung, Mayor of Taichung (2014–2018).
- 30 July – Chiang Shu-na, singer, television presenter and actress.
- 20 December – Carl Chien, Co-Head of Banking for JPMorgan Greater China.
- 23 December – Chen Chi-mai, Deputy Secretary-General of the Presidential Office (2007–2008).

== Deaths ==
- 22 February – Pai Ko, 50, film director, executed.
- 19 June – Jiang Menglin, 78, educator, writer, and politician, head of the Sino-American Joint Commission on Rural Reconstruction (1948–1964).
- 20 June – Wang Jingjiu, 61–62, general.
- 13 October – Xu Shiying, 91, politician, Premier (1925–1926).
- 10 November – Yu Youren, 85, President of the Control Yuan (1930-1964).
