= Wu Shaocheng =

Chinese military officer and politician (750–810)

Wu Shaocheng Prince of Puyang (濮陽王)
- 吳少誠

Military Governor of Zhangyi Circuit
- In office 786 – January 6, 810
- Preceded by: Chen Xianqi
- Succeeded by: Wu Shaoyang

Personal details
- Born: 750 You Prefecture (幽州, modern Beijing)
- Died: January 6, 810 Cai Prefecture (蔡州, modern Zhumadian, Henan)
- Profession: Military general, politician
- Known for: Ruling Zhangyi Circuit in semi-independence from Tang authority; rebellion against Emperor Dezong

Military service
- Allegiance: Tang dynasty
- Branch/service: Tang military
- Rank: Jiedushi (Military Governor)
- Battles/wars: Campaign against Liang Chongyi, Rebellion against imperial forces (798–800)

Wu Shaocheng (Chinese: 吳少誠) (750 – January 6, 810), formally the Prince of Puyang (濮陽王), was a Chinese military general and politician who served as the military governor of Zhangyi Circuit (彰義, headquartered in modern Zhumadian, Henan), ruled the circuit in a de facto independent manner from the imperial regime, at one point engaging a campaign against imperial forces.

== Background ==
Wu Shaocheng was born in 750, during the reign of Emperor Xuanzong. His family was from You Prefecture (幽州, in modern Beijing), and his father served as an officer at Weibo Circuit (魏博, headquartered in modern Handan, Hebei). As a result of his father's service, Wu Shaocheng became a guard officer for an imperial prince. Later, on an occasion when he was in Jingnan Circuit (荊南, headquartered in modern Jingzhou, Hubei), the military governor (Jiedushi) Yu Zhun (庾準) was impressed by Wu and kept Wu as a guard commander at his headquarters.

When Yu was subsequently recalled to the capital Chang'an, Wu followed him. As they went through Xiangyang, Wu saw that the military governor of the circuit headquartered at Xiangyang, Liang Chongyi of Shannan East Circuit (山南東道), was not following imperial orders, he secretly drafted strategies on defeating Liang and was planning on offering them to Emperor Dezong. He first offered them to general Li Xilie the military governor of Huaixi Circuit (淮西, the same circuit that would later be renamed Zhangyi). Li Xilie favored them and offered them to Emperor Dezong as his own strategies, and Emperor Dezong put Li in charge of the operations against Liang in 781. Li made Wu his forward commander in the campaign against Liang. After Li defeated Liang later in the year, leading to Liang's suicide, Wu was rewarded. When Li himself turned against the imperial government and declared himself emperor in 784, Wu continued to serve him. In 786, Li was assassinated by his officer Chen Xianqi, who submitted to imperial authority, and Emperor Dezong made Chen the military governor of Huaixi Circuit. Several months later, however, Wu, avenging Li, assassinated Chen. Emperor Dezong made his son Li Liang (李諒) the Prince of Qian the titular military governor, but did not send Li Liang to Huaixi, and made Wu the acting military governor.

== Initial service as Jiedushi ==
During the brief duration that Chen Xianqi served as military governor, he had sent some 5,000 Huaixi troops to the western border of the empire to assist the defense of that border with Tufan. After Wu Shaochen assassinated Chen, he secretly ordered the commander of those troops, Wu Fachao (吳法超), to return to Huaixi. Wu Fachao thus mutinied in spring 787, took the troops, and headed back toward Huaixi without permission, and when the general commanding the operations against Tufan, Hun Jian, sent troops to intercept Wu Fachao, Wu Fachao defeated the troops he sent. However, as Wu Fachao went through Shan'guo Circuit (陝虢, headquartered in modern Sanmenxia, Henan), he was crushed by the governor (Guanchashi, 觀察使) of Shan'guo, Li Mi, with only some 47 soldiers making it back to Huaixi. Wu Shaocheng, as he did not want to damage his relations with the imperial government over this small number of soldiers, executed them and pretended to know nothing of their mutiny.

Wu Shaocheng was said to be an effective, diligent, frugal, and fair governor, but was not loyal to the imperial government. Later in 787, he strengthened the walls of Huaixi's capital Cai Prefecture (蔡州), intending to be ready to stand against any imperial attacks. Meanwhile, his secretary Zheng Chang (鄭常) and officer Yang Ji (楊冀) plotted to expel him and submit to the imperial government, and they had the scribe Liu She (劉涉) forge a number of imperial edicts, addressed to various Huaixi officers, to try to get them join the plot. Thereafter, when an imperial eunuch messenger arrived at Cai Prefecture, Wu went out of the city to welcome the imperial messenger, and Zheng and Yang were set to carry out their plot. However, someone informed the plot to Wu, and Wu executed Zheng, Yang, and another official involved in the plot, Zhang Boyuan (張伯元). Two others, Song Min (宋旻) and Cao Ji (曹濟) fled to the imperial capital Chang'an. In 789, Emperor Dezong made him full military governor.

In 793, when Liu Shi'ning (劉士寧) the military governor of nearby Xuanwu Circuit (宣武, headquartered in modern Kaifeng, Henan) was expelled by his soldiers, and his officer Li Wanrong (李萬榮) took over, Wu took his troops to the borders with Xuanwu and demanded an explanation. Li, however, sent back sarcastic replies, and Wu, judging himself to lack the strength to attack Xuanwu at the time, withdrew. In 797, without imperial permission, Wu was digging a new canal, Dao Canal (刀溝), that would divert from Ru River (汝水, flowing through modern Zhumadian), claiming that it would be beneficial to the farmers, and when Emperor Dezong sent eunuchs to stop him, he refused to stop. When Emperor Dezong thereafter sent the official Lu Qun (盧群) to dissuade him, Lu pointed out that if he openly defied an imperial order, he risked having his subordinates defy him as well. Wu thereafter stopped the Dao Canal project.

== Rebellion against Emperor Dezong ==
In 798, for reasons lost to history, Wu Shaocheng, whose circuit had been renamed Zhangyi by this point, sent troops to pillage Huoshan County (霍山, in modern Lu'an, Anhui), belonging to Shou Prefecture (壽州, in modern Lu'an) of Huai'nan Circuit (淮南, headquartered in modern Yangzhou, Jiangsu), killing Huoshan's defender Xie Xiang (謝詳) and occupying Huoshan. In 799, he further attacked Tang Prefecture (唐州, in modern Zhumadian), belonging to Shannan East Circuit, killing its prefect Zhang Jiayu (張嘉瑜) and eunuch monitor Shao Guochao (邵國朝) and capturing over 1,000 residents. When Qu Huan (曲環) the military governor of Chenxu Circuit (陳許, headquartered in modern Xuchang, Henan) died in the fall that year, Wu further attacked Chenxu, putting its capital Xu Prefecture under siege, although his attacks were eventually repelled. (Wu had made a secret pact with then-military governor of Xuanwu, Liu Quanliang (劉全諒), to attack Chenxu together and divide its territory, but Liu died around that time as well, and Liu's successor Han Hong refused to follow the pact and further sent troops to help the defense against Wu's attack.) In response, Emperor Dezong stripped Wu of all of his offices and ordered the circuits around his to attack him. Subsequently, Han, along with Yu Di the military governor of Shannan East Circuit, Yi Shen (伊慎) the military governor of Anhuang Circuit (安黃, headquartered in modern Xiaogan, Hubei), Chenxu's new military governor Shangguan Shui (上官涗), and Shou Prefecture's prefect Wang Zong (王宗), attacked Wu together, initially enjoying some successes. However, as the imperial forces lacked a supreme commander, they did not coordinate their operations and did not look out for each other. Late in 799, for reasons unknown, the imperial forces suddenly collapsed themselves, abandoning their camp site at Little Yin River (小殷水, flowing through Luohe, Henan), and Wu was able to take over their supplies after they abandoned their camp. After forces sent from Chengde (成德, headquartered in modern Shijiazhuang, Hebei), Yiwu (義武, headquartered in modern Baoding, Hebei), Chenxu, and Heyang (河陽, headquartered in modern Luoyang, Henan) were also defeated by Wu in spring 800, Emperor Dezong commissioned Han Quanyi (韓全義) the military governor of Xiasui Circuit (夏綏, headquartered in modern Yulin, Shaanxi) as the overall commander of the forces against Wu. However, Han Quanyi was also unsuccessful against Wu and later in 800 was defeated at Wulou (五樓, in modern Zhumadian). After Wu withdrew back to Cai Prefecture in winter 800, Emperor Dezong, at the advice of the general Wei Gao and the chancellor Jia Dan, considered pardoning Wu. Wu also sent letters to nearby imperial eunuch messengers, requesting exoneration. Emperor Dezong thus pardoned Wu and his soldiers, restoring them to their titles. It was said that Wu, meanwhile, strengthened the resolve of the people of Zhangyi against imperial forces by showing them letters addressed to Han Quanyi that he captured in the Battle of Wulou, falsely claiming that those were requests by imperial officials requesting Han to pillage Zhangyi and seizing women to serve as the officials' concubines. He further had his soldiers' armors be inscribed with magical writing intended to curse the imperial troops.

== Resubmission to Tang rule ==
In 805, Emperor Dezong's son Emperor Shunzong gave Wu Shaocheng the honorary chancellor designation of Tong Zhongshu Menxia Pingzhangshi (同中書門下平章事).

When Wu Shaocheng was at Weibo, he had a close relationship with a Weibo officer named Wu Shaoyang. Sometime after he became military governor, he sent gold and silk to Weibo Circuit, requesting that he be allowed to have Wu Shaoyang. Weibo allowed Wu Shaoyang to report to Zhangyi. Wu Shaocheng claimed that Wu Shaoyang was a cousin, and gave him various commissions; Wu Shaoyang was also given access to Wu Shaocheng's mansion. Still, because Wu Shaocheng was cruel and suspicious, Wu Shaoyang requested a position not at headquarters, and Wu Shaocheng made him the prefect of Shen Prefecture (申州, in modern Xinyang, Henan). It was said that because Wu Shaoyang was lenient, he became favored by the army. When Wu Shaocheng grew ill in 809 and fell unconscious, his servant Xianyu Xiong'er (鮮于熊兒) forged an order in Wu Shaocheng's name recalling Wu Shaoyang to serve as deputy military governor. Wu Shaoyang put Wu Shaocheng's son Wu Yuanqing (吳元慶) to death and took over the circuit. After Wu Shaocheng died around the new year 810, Wu Shaoyang claimed the title of acting military governor, which was eventually recognized by Emperor Shunzong's son Emperor Xianzong later in 810.

== Notes and references ==
- Old Book of Tang, vol. 145.
- New Book of Tang, vol. 214.
- Zizhi Tongjian, vols. 227, 232, 234, 235, 236, 238.
