= 1955 in Taiwan =

- Decades: 1930s; 1940s; 1950s; 1960s; 1970s
- See also: Other events of 1955; History of Taiwan • Timeline • Years

Events from the year 1955 in Taiwan, Republic of China. This year is numbered Minguo 44 according to the official Republic of China calendar.

== Incumbents ==
- President – Chiang Kai-shek
- Vice President – Chen Cheng
- Premier – Yu Hung-chun
- Vice Premier – Huang Shao-ku

== Events ==
=== January ===
- 28 January – United States Congress authorizes President Dwight D. Eisenhower to use force to protect Formosa from the People's Republic of China.

=== May ===
- 1 May – The end of First Taiwan Strait Crisis.

=== October ===
- 31 October – The establishment of National School of Arts in Taipei County.

== Births ==
- 10 February – Cho Chun-ying, acting Mayor of Tainan (2001).
- 29 March – Kong Jaw-sheng, Chairperson of Financial Supervisory Commission (2004–2006).
- 7 April – Christina Liu, Minister of Finance (2012).
- 13 May – Chen Ming-wen, Magistrate of Chiayi County (2001–2009).
- 15 May – Andrew Yang, Minister of National Defense (2013).
- 17 May – Pai Bing-bing, singer and actress.
- 30 June – Hsu Yao-chang, Magistrate of Miaoli County.
- 9 July – Wu Se-hwa, Minister of Education (2014–2016).
- 27 July – Pan Shih-wei, Minister of Labor (2014).
- 10 August – Shih Jun-ji, designated Vice Premier of the Republic of China.
- 22 August – Jaclyn Tsai, Minister of Mongolian and Tibetan Affairs Commission (2013–2016).
- 7 October – Thomas Lee, member of Legislative Yuan (2002–2005, 2012–2016).
- 25 October – Chen Kuang-fu, Magistrate of Penghu County.
- 29 October – Cyrus Chu, Minister of National Science Council (2012–2014).
- 16 November – Chen Wen-Chi, President and CEO of VIA Technologies.
- 25 November – Chen Ming-tong, Minister of Mainland Affairs Council.
