= 1966 in Taiwan =

- Decades: 1940s; 1950s; 1960s; 1970s; 1980s
- See also: Other events of 1966; History of Taiwan • Timeline • Years

Events from the year 1966 in Taiwan, Republic of China. This year is numbered Minguo 55 according to the official Republic of China calendar.

== Incumbents ==
- President – Chiang Kai-shek
- Vice President – Yen Chia-kan
- Premier – Yen Chia-kan
- Vice Premier – Yu Ching-tang, Huang Shao-ku

== Events ==
=== January ===
- 7 January – The establishment of Chun Yuan Steel.
- 28 January – The establishment of National Youth Commission.

=== February ===
- 15 February – President of South Korea Park Chung-hee visited Taiwan.

=== March ===
- 13 March – The 8.0 M_{s} Hualien earthquake occurred off the Hualien County coast.
- 22 March – The completion of Jhaishan Tunnel in Kinmen County.

=== July ===
- 17 July – The completion of Touliao Guesthouse construction in Daxi Township, Taoyuan County.

=== September ===
- 1 September – The appointment of Sun Fo as the President of Examination Yuan.

=== December ===
- 30 December – Taipei was approved by Executive Yuan to become a special municipality.

== Births ==
- 5 January – Hsu Chih-chieh, member of 8th Legislative Yuan
- 15 May – Hsu Yung-ming, member of Legislative Yuan
- 22 June – Doze Niu, actor, film director, show host, screenwriter and producer
- 23 June – Richie Jen, actor and singer
- 31 August – Stella Chang, singer
- 6 December – Yang Yao, member of Legislative Yuan
- 12 December – Li Meng-yen, Secretary-General of Executive Yuan
