= 1965 in Taiwan =

- Decades: 1940s; 1950s; 1960s; 1970s; 1980s
- See also: Other events of 1965; History of Taiwan • Timeline • Years

Events from the year 1965 in Taiwan, Republic of China. This year is numbered Minguo 54 according to the official Republic of China calendar.

== Incumbents ==
- President – Chiang Kai-shek
- Vice President – Chen Cheng
- Premier – Yen Chia-kan
- Vice Premier – Yu Ching-tang

== Events ==
=== April ===
- 29 April – The establishment of Kun Shan Institute of Technology in Tainan County.

=== November ===
- 12 November – The reestablishment of National Palace Museum in Shilin District, Taipei.

== Births ==
- 14 January – Wang San-tsai, fencing athlete
- 19 January – Donna Chiu, singer
- 19 March – Weng Chang-liang, Magistrate of Chiayi County
- 27 March – Cho Po-yuan, Magistrate of Changhua County (2005–2014)
- 7 May – Tai Chih-yuan, comedian, actor, and show host
- 23 May – Kenneth Yen, CEO of Yulon Motor
- 6 July – Lee Chun-yi, Deputy Mayor of Chiayi (2001–2004)
- 3 September – Yang Hung-duen, Minister of Science and Technology (2016–2017)
- 16 September – Lo Kuo-chong, baseball player
- 21 September – Kao Chin Su-mei, member of 5th, 6th, 7th, 8th and 9th Legislative Yuan
- 16 November – Pauline Lan, host, actress, singer and businesswoman
- 1 December – Ma Wen-chun, member of 8th and 9th Legislative Yuan
- 4 December – Pasuya Yao, member of 8th and 9th Legislative Yuan

== Deaths ==
- 5 March – Chen Cheng, 67, general and politician, Vice President (1954–1965).
- 29 July – Foo Ping-sheung, 69, diplomat and politician.
- 3 October – Wang Baiyuan, 62, poet and writer.
