= Chen Xianqi =

General in the Chinese Tang dynasty

Chen Xianqi (Chinese: 陳仙奇) (died c.August 786) was a general of the Chinese Tang dynasty. He had served under Li Xilie, who had rebelled against Emperor Dezong and claimed the title of emperor of his own state of Chu. Li Xilie, however, by 786, had become repeatedly defeated by Tang forces. When Li Xilie grew ill, Chen had him poisoned and then submitted to Tang, but was himself in turn assassinated by Wu Shaocheng later in the year.

== Service under and killing of Li Xilie ==
Virtually nothing is known about Chen Xianqi's background, including his birth date or his family origin. It is known that he had risen from soldier ranks to serve as an officer below Li Xilie while Li Xilie was the Tang military governor (Jiedushi) of Huaixi Circuit. His wife carried the surname Dou, the same surname as Li Xilie's favorite concubine, a daughter of the official Dou Liang (竇良), whom Li Xilie had forced to become his concubine during the time he claimed imperial title at the emperor of his own state of Chu (a title he claimed in 784). Dou Liang's daughter, however, was secretly plotting against Li Xilie, and she persuaded Li Xilie that Chen was faithful and capable and thus should be trusted. Because she and Chen's wife shared the same surname, she informed Li Xilie that she would try to enter a friendship with Chen's wife in order to ensure his loyalty. After she befriended Chen's wife, she instead involved Chen and Chen's wife in the plot to destroy Li Xilie. When Li Xilie grew ill after eating beef in summer 786, at Chen's instigation, Li Xilie's physician poisoned him to death.

After Li Xilie's death, Li Xilie's son did not announce his death and was planning to kill officers who would not submit to him, and then declare himself Li Xilie's successor. Li Xilie's concubine Lady Dou, who had just received some peaches as tribute, wrote down the son's plans and hid the plan in a wax ball, and then hid the wax ball in a peach which she then gave to Chen's wife. Chen, realizing what Li Xilie's son was planning, entered the mansion along with fellow officer Xue Yu (薛育) and killed Li Xilie's son. He then killed Li Xilie's wife, brothers, and sons, and delivered the heads of Li Xilie, his wife, and his sons to the Tang capital Chang'an and submitted to Emperor Dezong. Emperor Dezong made him military governor of Huaixi.

== As Jiedushi ==
As military governor, Chen tried to show loyalty to the imperial government immediately, and he sent troops to Tang's western borders that fall to help defend against attacks by Tufan. Just three months after he killed Li Xilie, however, one of LI Xilie's close associates, Wu Shaocheng, killed him and took over as acting military governor. Li Xilie's concubine also died in the coup. Emperor Dezong, while mourning Chen, did not dare to wage a campaign against Wu, and he made his own son Li Liang (李諒) the Prince of Qian the nominal military governor and Wu the deputy military governor, thus effectively allowing Wu to take over the circuit.

== Notes and references ==
- Old Book of Tang, vol. 145.
- New Book of Tang, vol. 225, part 2.
- Zizhi Tongjian, vol. 232.
