= 1959 in Taiwan =

- Decades: 1930s; 1940s; 1950s; 1960s; 1970s
- See also: Other events of 1959; History of Taiwan • Timeline • Years

Events from the year 1959 in Taiwan, Republic of China. This year is numbered Minguo 48 according to the official Republic of China calendar.

== Incumbents ==
- President – Chiang Kai-shek
- Vice President – Chen Cheng
- Premier – Chen Cheng
- Vice Premier – Wang Yun-wu

== Events ==
=== February ===
- 1 February – The establishment of National Science Council.

=== August ===
- 15 August – The magnitude 7.1 Hengchun earthquake occurs offshore southern Taiwan.

=== September ===
- 21 September – Nantou shooting in Nantou County.

=== December ===
- 16 December – The establishment of China Airlines.

== Births ==
- 17 January – Diane Lee, member of Legislative Yuan (1993–2002, 2008–2009)
- 20 January – Huang Min-hui, Mayor of Chiayi City
- 22 January
  - Cho Jung-tai, Chairperson of Democratic Progressive Party
  - Tseng Ming-chung, Chairperson of Financial Supervisory Commission (2013–2016)
- 10 March – Tseng Chih-chen, baseball player
- 31 March – Lin Cheng-sheng, film director
- 6 August – Ko Wen-je, Mayor of Taipei
- 13 August – Liu Shyh-fang, Secretary-General of Executive Yuan (2002–2004)
- 8 September – Yu Cheng-hsien, Minister of the Interior (2002–2004)
- 19 September – Hao Feng-ming, Political Deputy Minister of Labor
- 8 October – Chang Ching-sen, Governor of Fujian Province (2016–2019)
- 23 October – Woody Duh, Vice Premier (2016)
- 6 November – Justin Huang, Magistrate of Taitung County (2009–2018)
- 7 November – Lu Tien-ling, Minister of Council of Labor Affairs (2007–2008)
- 28 December – Lu Chien-soon, golf athlete
