= Wanyou Wenku =

Chinese encyclopedic and literary work (1929)

Wanyou Wenku (Chinese: 萬有文庫/万有文库, literally the encyclopaedic library) is an extensive collectanea first published by the Commercial Press at Shanghai in 1929. The collection, edited by Wang Yun-wu, comprises 1,710 titles, totalling 4,000 volumes; among these, the first set comprises 1,010 books with a total of 2,000 volumes, and the second set composed of 700 titles in another 2,000 volumes. As noted by Wang, the purpose of this collection is to make important texts, both traditional and modern, available for public perusal at an affordable price.
