= 1956 in Taiwan =

- Decades: 1930s; 1940s; 1950s; 1960s; 1970s
- See also: Other events of 1956; History of Taiwan • Timeline • Years

Events from the year 1956 in Taiwan, Republic of China. This year is numbered Minguo 45 according to the official Republic of China calendar.

== Incumbents ==
- President – Chiang Kai-shek
- Vice President – Chen Cheng
- Premier – Yu Hung-chun
- Vice Premier – Huang Shao-ku

== Events ==
=== July ===
- 16 July – The streamlining of Fujian Province Government.

=== August ===
- 1 August – The establishment of Fuxing Broadcasting Station.

== Births ==
- 22 February – Lu Kuo-hua, Magistrate of Yilan County (2005–2009)
- 2 March – Chen Hung-chang, member of Legislative Yuan (1993–2005)
- 5 March – Sung Yu-hsieh, Deputy Minister of National Development Council (2014)
- 13 March – Kuo Yao-chi, Minister of Transportation and Communications (2006)
- 15 May – Yang Chiu-hsing, Magistrate of Kaohsiung County (2001–2010)
- 24 May – Teng Chia-chi, Deputy Mayor of Taipei
- 21 June – Lee Hong-yuan, Minister of the Interior (2012–2014)
- 7 July – Pu Tze-chun, Vice Minister of National Defense (2017-2018)
- 20 July – Su Huan-chih, Magistrate of Tainan County (2001–2010)
- 14 August – Lo Chih-tsung, head coach of Chinese Taipei national football team (1985–1988, 2009–2011)
- 15 August – Kuan Chung-ming, Minister of National Development Council (2014–2015)
- 24 August – Chu T’ien-wen, writer
- 30 August – King Pu-tsung, Secretary-General of National Security Council (2014–2015)
- 23 September – Chen Liang-gee, Political Deputy Minister of Education
- 29 September – Akio Chen, actor
- 10 October – Huang Fu-yuan, Minister of Directorate-General of Personnel Administration (2012–2016)
- 22 October – Su Jia-chyuan, President of the Legislative Yuan
- 16 December – Sra Kacaw, member of Legislative Yuan
- 9 December – Kuan Bi-ling, member of Legislative Yuan

== Deaths ==
- 25 April – He Jian, 69, general and politician.
- 28 June – Hsu Mo, 62, lawyer, politician, diplomat, judge at the International Court of Justice (1946–1956) (in the Netherlands).
- 24 July – Qiu Changwei, 57, politician, Secretary-General to the President (1949–1950).
- 8 September – Lin Hsien-tang, 74, politician (in Japan).
- 11 December – Mao Renfeng, 58, general and spymaster, director of the Bureau of Investigation and Statistics (1946–1956).
