= 1957 in Taiwan =

- Decades: 1930s; 1940s; 1950s; 1960s; 1970s
- See also: Other events of 1957; History of Taiwan • Timeline • Years

Events from the year 1957 in Taiwan, Republic of China. This year is numbered Minguo 46 according to the official Republic of China calendar.

== Incumbents ==
- President – Chiang Kai-shek
- Vice President – Chen Cheng
- Premier – Yu Hung-Chun
- Vice Premier – Huang Shao-ku

== Events ==
=== March ===
- 29 March – The opening of National Center of Arts in Taipei.

=== April ===
- 21 April – Local elections held.

=== June ===
- 5 June – The establishment of Far Eastern Air Transport.

== Births ==
- 7 January – Yeh Kuang-shih, Minister of Transportation and Communications (2013–2015).
- 28 February – Perng Shaw-jiin, Deputy Chairperson of Fair Trade Commission.
- 31 March – Tina Pan, member of Legislative Yuan (1993–2002, 2005–2016).
- 10 May – Wu Cherng-dean, member of Legislative Yuan (2002–2008).
- 7 June – Hou You-yi, Mayor of New Taipei.
- 17 June – Han Kuo-yu, Mayor of Kaohsiung.
- 2 September – Chiang Wei-ling, Minister of Education (2012–2014).
- 7 October – Shyu Jong-shyong, Deputy Secretary-General of Executive Yuan (2015–2016).
- 22 December – Tsai Chin, singer.
