= 1961 in Taiwan =

- Decades: 1940s; 1950s; 1960s; 1970s; 1980s
- See also: Other events of 1961; History of Taiwan • Timeline • Years

Events in the year 1961 in Taiwan, Republic of China. This year is numbered Minguo 50 according to the official Republic of China calendar.

== Incumbents ==
- President – Chiang Kai-shek
- Vice President – Chen Cheng
- Premier – Chen Cheng
- Vice Premier – Wang Yun-wu

== Events ==
=== February ===
- 20 February – The opening of Cingjing Farm in Nantou County.

=== April ===
- 1 April – The establishment of the Project National Glory office.

=== July ===
- 7 July – The establishment of Taipei Broadcasting Station.

=== October ===
- 10 October – 50th Double Ten Day.
- 23 October – The establishment of Taiwan Stock Exchange.
- 31 October – The establishment of Republic of China Armed Forces Museum in Zhongzheng District, Taipei.

== Births ==
- 7 June – Eric Chu, Mayor of New Taipei (2010–2015, 2016-2018).
- 18 June – Chao Chuan, singer.
- 31 August – Lu Shiow-yen, Mayor of Taichung.
- 1 September – Jody Chiang, singer.
- 2 October – Wang Ju-hsuan, Minister of Council of Labor Affairs (2008–2012).
- 12 November – Su Jain-rong, Ministry of Finance.
- 25 December – Lin Hsi-yao, Vice Premier of the Republic of China.

== Deaths ==
- 7 May – He Chengjun, 78, general.
- 5 November – Luo Zhuoying, 65, general.
