= Kuo Yi-feng =

Taiwanese baseball player

Brother Elephants – No. 36
- Catcher
- Born: 24 March 1976 (age 50); Taiwan
- Bats: Right Throws: Right

CPBL debut
- March 20, 1999, for the Wei Chuan Dragons

Career statistics (through 2008)
- Batting average: .192
- Home runs: 5
- Runs batted in: 108
- Stats at Baseball Reference

Teams
- Wei Chuan Dragons (1999); Brother Elephants (2000–present)

Kuo Yi-feng (Chinese: 郭一峰; pinyin: Guō Yīfēng; Wade–Giles: Kuo^{1} Yi^{1} Feng^{1}; born 24 March 1976 in Taiwan) is a Taiwanese baseball player who currently plays for Brother Elephants of Chinese Professional Baseball League. He currently plays as catcher for the Elephants. In his first professional year, he is Wei Chuan Dragons player. The next year, Wei Chuan Dragons has disbanded, he was picked up by Brother Elephants.

== Career statistics ==
Season	G	AB	H	HR	RBI	SB	BB	SO	TB	DP	AVG
1999	20	23	3	0	1	1	3	10	3	0	.130
2000	43	88	13	2	15	1	9	28	20	0	.148
2001	75	194	41	1	19	6	24	67	56	8	.211
2002	50	96	19	0	5	0	10	48	22	2	.198
2003	50	97	17	3	12	2	8	34	29	4	.175
2004	39	77	11	1	7	0	8	30	14	2	.143
2005	68	162	25	2	10	1	19	61	35	5	.154
2006	32	70	11	0	10	0	3	24	16	3	.157
2007	40	84	15	0	10	0	5	32	19	2	.179
2008	77	197	54	3	19	2	26	53	76	3	.274
Total	494	1088	209	12	108	12	115	387	290	29	.192
