= Qi Ying =

Chinese politician

Qi Ying (Chinese: 齊映; 748 – August 15, 795), posthumous name Baron Zhong of Hejian (河間忠男), was a Chinese politician, serving as a chancellor during the reign of Emperor Dezong.

== Background ==
Qi Ying was born in 748, during the reign of Emperor Xuanzong. His family was from Ying Prefecture (瀛州, in modern Baoding, Hebei) and claimed ancestry from the Spring and Autumn period state Qi's ruling Jiang house. His father Qi Pi (齊圮) might have served as an acting official in the imperial government, but there is no historical record as to his grandfather or more distant ancestors. He had at least two older brothers, Qi Zhāo (齊昭) and Qi Wen (齊汶), and two younger brothers, Qi Hao (齊皞) and Qi Zhao (齊照, note different tone than the other brother), who served as officials, and one younger brother, Qi Xi (齊煦), who did not.

== Early career ==
Qi Ying passed the imperial examinations with the highest score, and he further passed two special imperial examinations on depth of knowledge and magnificent style, and thereafter was made an officer at Henan Municipality (河南, i.e., the region of the eastern capital Luoyang). Thereafter, the military governor (Jiedushi) of Yongping Circuit (永平, headquartered in modern Anyang, Henan), Linghu Zhang (令狐彰) invited Qi to serve as his scribe. In 773, Linghu grew gravely ill. Qi, whom Linghu asked to draft his will and final petition to Emperor Xuanzong's grandson Emperor Daizong, suggested, and Linghu agreed, that he should not ask that his son Linghu Jian (令狐建) be allowed to succeed him, that he should suggest replacement for himself (Linghu ultimately recommended either Liu Yan or Li Mian, and Emperor Daizong chose Li), and that he should send Linghu Jian and the other sons back to his mansion at Luoyang. Linghu Zhang also gave a daughter to Qi in marriage. After Linghu died that year, there was a disturbance in the Yongping Army, and Qi left Yongping and went to Luoyang. Thereafter, Ma Sui the commander of the army at Heyang (河陽, in modern Luoyang) invited Qi to serve as his secretary.

== During Emperor Dezong's reign ==
Early in the Jianzhong era (780–783) of Emperor Daizong's son Emperor Dezong, the chancellor Lu Qi recommended Qi Ying, and Qi was made Xingbu Yuanwailang (刑部員外郎), a low-level official at the ministry of justice (刑部, Xingbu). Subsequently, when the chancellor Zhang Yi was made the military governor of Fengxiang Circuit (鳳翔, headquartered in modern Baoji, Shaanxi) in 783, Qi was made his secretary. As Qi was good at speaking and often made suggestions in military matters, Zhang favored him and soon recommended him to be a military commander (行軍司馬, Xingjun Sima).

In fall 783, soldiers from Jingyuan Circuit (涇原, headquartered in modern Pingliang, Gansu), at the capital Chang'an to await deployment to the east against warlords, mutinied when they did not receive rewards they felt they deserved. Emperor Dezong fled to Fengtian (奉天, in modern Xianyang, Shaanxi), but as Fengtian was a small city, considered further heading to Fengxiang. The soldiers supported the general Zhu Ci, who had formerly served as the military governor of Fengxiang but who had been replaced with Zhang due to the rebellion of his brother Zhu Tao, as their leader, and Zhu Ci initially postured that he would calm the people of Chang'an and then welcome Emperor Dezong back to Chang'an. Meanwhile, Zhang, hearing of the mutiny and of Emperor Dezong's considering visiting Fengxiang, began undertaking preparations for the emperor's arrival. Qi Ying and fellow staff member Qi Kang pointed out that one of the military officers, Li Chulin (李楚琳), was previously a subordinate of Zhu Ci's and would be difficult to control. Zhang thus issued an order that Li Chulin report to Long Prefecture (隴州, in modern Baoji). Li Chulin, giving excuses, did not report immediately, and Zhang, concentrating on welcoming the emperor, never followed up on whether Li Chulin left for Long Prefecture. The night of November 8, Li Chulin and his associates mutinied and attacked Zhang's headquarters. Zhang was killed, but as Qi Ying was well respected by the army, he was not killed. Both he and Qi Kang fled to Fengtian, and Emperor Dezong made him the deputy chief imperial censor (御史中丞, Yushi Zhongcheng).

In 784, when another rebellion, led by the general Li Huaiguang, forced Emperor Dezong to further flee to Liang Prefecture (梁州, in modern Hanzhong, Shaanxi), Qi Ying attended to the emperor and held the bridle for Emperor Dezong's horse whenever there was uneven ground. The imperial horse was not easily handled and often leaped. Emperor Dezong, fearful that Qi would be injured, told him not to hold the bridle any more, but Qi declined, stating, "If the horse leaped, it would only injure me. If I let the bridle go, it might harm Your Imperial Majesty. Even if I die 10,000 deaths, how can I be excused from that?" Emperor Dezong praised him, and when they arrived at Liang Prefecture, he made Qi an imperial attendant (給事中, Jishizhong). As Qi had a fair appearance, was tall, and spoke loudly, later, after Emperor Dezong was able to return to Chang'an later in 784, he often had Qi attend to him or ride the horse in front of him, and whichever town the emperor went through, Qi would personally proclaim the imperial edicts. He became especially trusted by Emperor Dezong thereafter, and that winter became a Zhongshu Sheren (中書舍人), a mid-level official at the legislative bureau of government (中書省, Zhongshu Sheng).

In 786, Qi was given the designation Tong Zhongshu Menxia Pingzhangshi (同中書門下平章事), making him a chancellor de facto, along with Liu Zi and Cui Zao. Qi was also created the Baron of Hejian. It was said that Emperor Dezong gave Cui the responsibilities because Cui was daring to speak and act, and that Liu and Qi were both thus yielding much of the responsibilities to Cui. Emperor Dezong also put the chancellors in direct command over the six ministries of the executive bureau (尚書省, Shangshu Sheng), and Qi was given the responsibilities over the ministry of defense (兵部, Bingbu). When a Tufan incursion threatened Chang'an, it was rumored that Emperor Dezong planned to flee Chang'an. Qi tearfully pointed out that it would not be easy for Emperor Dezong to be able to return to Chang'an again if he fled it, and advised against it; Emperor Dezong ultimately stayed in Chang'an. Qi began to have more control over important matters later that year after Cui fell ill. When the imperial attendant Yuan Gao (袁高) offended Emperor Dezong by his bluntness, Qi, apparently approving Yuan's bluntness, recommended Yuan to be a secretary general of the executive bureau and also chief imperial censor.

Meanwhile, Zhang Yanshang, who was the mayor of Henan when Qi was an officer there, was favored by Emperor Dezong but not chancellor at that time. As Zhang had treated Qi kindly while Qi served under him, he often made suggestions and recommendations of his associates to Qi, but Qi did not heed Zhang's requests. As of 787, when Zhang was chancellor as well, he therefore stated to Emperor Dezong that Qi did not have enough talent to be a chancellor. With Emperor Dezong also displeased with Qi's bluntness, Emperor Dezong demoted Qi to be the prefect of Kui Prefecture (夔州, in modern Chongqing). He was later made the prefect of Heng Prefecture (modern Hengyang in Hunan). In 791, he was made the governor (觀察使, Guanchashi) of Gui District (桂管, headquartered in modern Guilin, Guangxi), and in 792 was made the governor of Jiangxi Circuit (江西, headquartered in modern Nanchang, Jiangxi). Qi believed that, because he was demoted without major faults, he had a chance to be recalled to be chancellor again. He therefore gathered wealth from the people to pay tributes to Emperor Dezong, including gold and silver vessels. It was often the case at the time that governors would offer silver vases five chi tall, and on the emperor's birthday, Qi offered a silver vase eight chi tall. Nevertheless, he was not recalled, and he died in 795 and was given posthumous honors.

== Notes and references ==
- Old Book of Tang, vol. 136.
- New Book of Tang, vol. 150.
- Zizhi Tongjian, vols. 224, 228, 232.
