= Chu Hung-sen =

Taiwanese baseball player

Brother Elephants – No. 7
- Second baseman
- Born: March 23, 1978 (age 48); Taiwan
- Bats: Right Throws: Right

CPBL debut
- September 7, 2002, for the Brother Elephants

Career statistics (through 2008)
- Batting average: .231
- Home runs: 3
- Runs batted in: 76
- Stats at Baseball Reference

Teams
- Brother Elephants (2002–present)

Chu Hung-sen (Chinese: 朱鴻森; born 23 March 1978 in Taiwan) is a Taiwanese baseball player who currently plays as a second baseman for the Brother Elephants of the Chinese Professional Baseball League.

== Career statistics ==
Season	Team	G	AB	H	HR	RBI	SB	BB	SO	RBI	DP	AVG
2002	Brother Elephants	5	7	3	0	3	0	1	2	3	0	0.429
2003	Brother Elephants	28	58	9	0	3	3	5	6	9	2	0.155
2004	Brother Elephants	45	91	22	0	9	6	3	23	27	2	0.242
2005	Brother Elephants	92	343	77	0	27	25	49	36	91	4	0.224
2006	Brother Elephants	75	201	46	2	8	1	19	30	60	5	0.229
2007	Brother Elephants	46	82	15	0	6	0	4	17	18	2	0.183
2008	Brother Elephants	75	188	52	1	20	11	15	28	62	6	0.277
Total	7 years	366	970	224	3	76	46	78	155	270	21	0.231

== See also ==
- Chinese Professional Baseball League
- Brother Elephants
