= Qi Kang (official) =

Chinese historian and politician

Qi Kang (Chinese: 齊抗; pinyin: Qí Kàng) (740 – May 29, 804), courtesy name Xiaju (Chinese: 遐舉; pinyin: Xiájǔ), was a Chinese historian and politician of the Tang Dynasty serving as a chancellor during the reign of Emperor Dezong.

== Background ==
Qi Kang was born in 740, during the reign of Emperor Xuanzong. His family was from Ding Prefecture (Chinese: 定州; pinyin: Dìng Zhōu, in modern Baoding, Hebei). and claimed ancestry from the royal Jiang house of the Spring and Autumn period state Qi. His grandfather Qi Huan (Chinese: 齊澣; pinyin: Qí Huǎn) was a well-known commandery governor during Emperor Xuanzong's reign, although his father Qi Ao (Chinese: 齊翱; pinyin: Qí Áo) was described to have served in an insignificant position.

In Qi Kang's youth, the Anshi Rebellion swept over the northern parts of the Tang empire, and he took his mother and fled to Kuaiji (present-day Shaoxing in Zhejiang), where he spent his time studying. It was said that he was good at writing, particularly when it came to reports on various matters.

== During Emperor Daizong's reign ==
During the Dali era (766-779) of Emperor Xuanzong's grandson Emperor Daizong, Zhang Yi the prefect of Shou Prefecture (Chinese: 壽州; pinyin: Shòu Zhōu, in modern Lu'an, Anhui) invited Qi Kang to serve as an assistant. It was said that Qi was capable administratively and literarily, and Zhang respected him.

== During Emperor Dezong's reign ==
Early in the Jianzhong era (780-783) of Emperor Daizong's son Emperor Daizong, Zhang Yi became the governor of Jiangxi Circuit (Chinese: 江西; pinyin: Jiāngxī, headquartered in modern Nanchang, Jiangxi), and Qi Kang followed him and continued to serve on his staff. After Zhang later served a stint as chancellor and was made the military governor (Jiedushi) of Fengxiang Circuit (Chinese: 鳳翔; pinyin: Fèngxiáng, headquartered in modern Baoji, Shaanxi) in 782, he invited Qi to serve on his staff again. It was said that most of the military tactics that Zhang used at the time were suggested by Qi.

In fall 783, when a mutiny at the capital Chang'an forced Emperor Dezong to flee to Fengtian (Chinese: 奉天; pinyin: Fèngtiān, in modern Xianyang, Shaanxi), as Fengtian was a small city, Emperor Dezong considered further heading to Fengxiang. Meanwhile, Zhang, hearing of the mutiny and of Emperor Dezong's considering visiting Fengxiang, began undertaking preparations for the emperor's arrival. Qi Kang and fellow staff member Qi Ying pointed out that one of the military officers, Li Chulin (Chinese: 李楚琳; pinyin: Lǐ Chǔlín), was previously a subordinate of the mutiny leader Zhu Ci and would be difficult to control. Zhang thus issued an order that Li report to Long Prefecture (Chinese: 隴州; pinyin: Lǒng Zhōu, in modern Baoji). Li, giving excuses, did not report immediately, and Zhang, concentrating on welcoming the emperor, never followed up on whether Li left for Long Prefecture. That night, Li and his associates mutinied and attacked Zhang's headquarters. Zhang and two of his sons climbed over the city walls and tried to flee but were captured by the mutineers and killed. Qi Kang and Qi Ying both fled to Fengtian, and Emperor Dezong made Qi Kang an imperial censor with the title Shiyushi (Chinese: 侍御史; pinyin: Shìyùshǐ).

After the rebellions were quashed in 784 and Emperor Dezong returned to Chang'an, the treasury was drained, and a major part of the empire was laid waste. At that time, the official Yuan Xiu (Chinese: 元琇; pinyin: Yuán Xiù), who was in charge of the state salt and iron monopolies, believed that Qi Kang was capable and recommended him as Cangbu Langzhong (Chinese: 倉部郎中; pinyin: Cāngbù Làngzhōng), a supervisorial official at the ministry of census (Chinese: 戶部; pinyin: Hùbù), to be in charge of the salt monopoly in the Yangtze River-Huai River region. Qi was also soon made the deputy director of the supplies, in charge of supplying Chang'an with food from the Yangtze-Huai region. Soon, for minor faults that are lost to history, he was demoted to be the prefect of Chu Prefecture (處州, in modern Lishui, Zhejiang). He later served as the prefect of Su Prefecture (蘇州, in modern Suzhou, Jiangsu) before becoming the governor (觀察使, Guanchashi) of Hunan Circuit (湖南, headquartered in modern Changsha, Hunan) was well as the prefect of its capital Tan Prefecture (in modern Changsha, Hunan). He was later recalled serving as imperial attendant (給事中, Jishizhong) and then the mayor of Henan Municipality (河南, i.e., the region of the eastern capital Luoyang). He later successively served as Mishu Jian (秘書監), the director of the Palace Library and then the minister of worship (太常卿, Taichang Qing).

In 800, Qi was made Zhongshu Sheren (中書舍人), a mid-level official at the legislative bureau of government (中書省, Zhongshu Sheng) and given the designation Tong Zhongshu Menxia Pingzhangshi (同中書門下平章事). This made him a chancellor, replacing the recently demoted Zheng Yuqing. While serving as chancellor, Qi suggested the abolition of the system where, after the ministry of civil service affairs (吏部, Lìbu) selected officials to be commissioned, the officials from the legislative bureau and the examination bureau (門下省, Menxia Sheng) would reexamine the proposed list — reasoning that after the ministry of civil service affairs had carefully selected the officials, it would be a waste of time to reexamine. This suggestion was accepted. Per the customs of the time, as the deputy minister of rites was in charge of the imperial examinations, his relatives and friends would be given a separate imperial examination; under Qi's suggestion, that examination was also abolished. Also, per Qi's suggestions, various local officials were also given titles of corresponding central government officials. Emperor Dezong also gave Qi the responsibilities of editing the imperial histories.

It was said that while Qi was well-learned, he did not have long-term plans, but overly paid attention to details such that he became known for pickiness and harshness. In 803, after he became ill and offered to resign, he was made an advisor to Emperor Dezong's crown prince Li Song, and it was said that due to the illness, he was unable to thank Emperor Dezong in person. He died in 804 and was given posthumous honors. He was also given the posthumous name of Cheng (成, meaning "successful").

== Notes and references ==
- Old Book of Tang, vol. 136.
- New Book of Tang, vol. 128.
- Zizhi Tongjian, vols. 228, 235, 236.
