= China Maritime Institute =

Taiwanese research institute

- 中華航運學會
- Abbreviation: CMI
- Formation: 11 July 1962; 64 years ago
- Founder: Kuang Wang
- Headquarters: Taipei, Taiwan
- Website: www.maritime.org.tw

The China Maritime Institute (CMI; Chinese: 中華航運學會) is a non-profit Taiwanese institute that engages in academic research on maritime and aviation issues. Founded on 11 July 1962, CMI is based in Taipei City, Taiwan.

CMI was founded by Professor Kuang Wang, a researcher on maritime affairs in both. The China and Taiwan.

The permanent president of honour for CMI is Professor Kuan Lin, who is also the founder of Pacific Star Group in Taiwan. The current chairman of the CMI is Professor Chih-Ching Chang of the National Taiwan Ocean University. The 17th Board members of CMI will held their posts for three years from May 27, 2011 until May 26, 2014.

CMI is the publisher of the Maritime Quarterly.

CMI has established a late Prof. Kuang Wang Scholarship Commission to support students to study in the six major maritime universities and colleges in Taiwan. These institutions include National Taiwan Ocean University, National Kaohsiung Marine University, National Penghu University, Chang Jung Christian University, Kainan University and Taipei College of Maritime Technology.
