= Dong Zhao (general) =

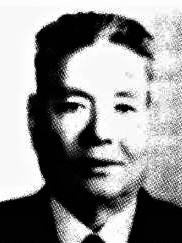
- Born: July 4, 1902; Xi'an, Shaanxi, Qing China
- Died: September 30, 1977 (aged 75); Taipei, Taiwan
- Allegiance: Republic of China
- Branch: (Republic of China (1912–1949)) National Revolutionary Army
- Rank: Lieutenant general
- Battles / wars: Chinese Civil War; Second Sino-Japanese War; Battle of Xuzhou; Battle of Taierzhuang

Dong Zhao (traditional Chinese: 董釗; simplified Chinese: 董钊; pinyin: Dǒng Zhāo; Wade–Giles: Tung Chao) (July 4, 1902 - September 30, 1977) was a Chinese National Revolutionary Army general during the Second Sino-Japanese War and the Chinese Civil War.

== Biography ==
A graduate of the Whampoa Military Academy, he fought against the Chinese Red Army during the Chinese Civil War. During the war against the Empire of Japan, he fought against Japanese forces at Battle of Xuzhou and the Battle of Taierzhuang and was commander of the 16th Army.

In July 1948, he was made governor of his home province. In May 1949, after the People's Liberation Army captured Xi'an, he fled to Hanzhong and later to Sichuan. On December 19, 1949, he left mainland China for Taiwan.
