= Qi Yaoshan =

Chinese politician

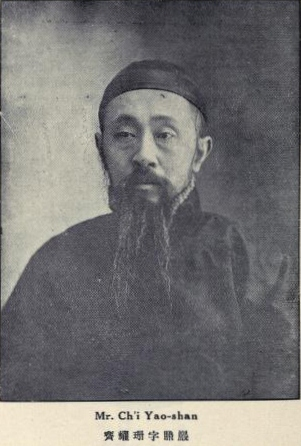
A picture of Qi Yaoshan

Qi Yaoshan (Chinese: 齊耀珊; 1865 - February 15, 1954), courtesy name Zhaoyan, was a statesman and government official in the Qing dynasty and Republic of China. He was born in Yitong County (now Sitaizu Village, Mengjialing Town, Lishu County), Jilin.

== Qing dynasty ==
Qi Yaoshan was born in Jilin in 1865. In 1889, he had become a Juren in the Imperial Examination system. In the following year, he became a scholar of Genshenke. In May 1890, he was awarded the position of Chancellor (Zhongshu) of the Cabinet. He served as a copy-writer serving the Governor of Hubei, the Zongban (high organizational rank) to the Baojia of Wuchang, the Prefect of Yichang Prefecture, and at the General Office of the Qingzhang Bureau of Hankou.

Towards the final years of the reign of the Guangxu Emperor, Qi was promoted to the position of administrator of Jingyi Circuit and Hanhuangde Circuit in Hubei. After this, he served at the General Office of Honghanguan at the Public Relations Office, as well as at the head of the Hubei Provincial Government Supervising and Training Office and as a manager of academic affairs in Hubei.

== Republican Era ==
In 1913, Qi served as the director of the Beijing Salt Production Affairs Preparation Office. In March of the following year, he served as a delegate to the Republic of China Constitutional Convention. In May, he was appointed to the National Assembly.

In 1918, Qi was appointed Governor of Zhejiang Province. In 1920, he was appointed Governor of Shandong Province. In 1921, he served as the Chief Cabinet Secretary of Jin Yunpeng and the Prime Minister of the Famine Relief Society. In June, he began supervising the affairs of Beijing Normal University. In July, he was appointed to the position of President of Shangwu (Commercial) Bank. In December, he entered the Cabinet of Agriculture and Commerce under Liang Shiyi, as well as becoming the Minister of Education. In 1922, Qi was appointed Chairman of the Grain Survey Committee. In April, he was removed from his position as Minister of Education, and in June, he was removed from his position as being the President of the Shangwu Bank. In 1927, he served as a member of the Political Discussion Committee of the Anguojun Government under Zhang Zuolin, as well as becoming a researcher of Beijing Ancient Studies University.

On February 15, 1954, Qi died in Taipei. His family consisted of his older brother, Qi Yaolin, and his younger brother, Qi Yaocheng.
