= Sun Yun-suan =

Taiwanese politician

- 孫運璿
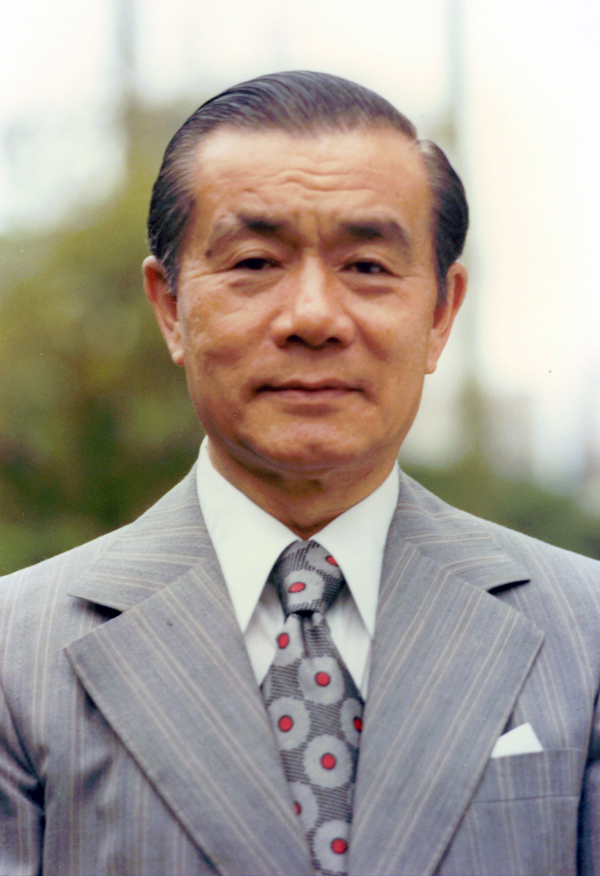
- Official portrait, 1978

Senior Advisor to the President
- In office 1 June 1984 – 15 February 2006
- President: Chiang Ching-kuo; Lee Teng-hui; Chen Shui-bian

10th Premier of the Republic of China
- In office 1 June 1978 – 24 February 1984
- President: Chiang Ching-kuo
- Vice Premier: Hsu Ching-chung; Chiu Chuang-huan
- Preceded by: Hsu Ching-chung (acting)
- Succeeded by: Chiu Chuang-huan (acting)

13th Minister of Economic Affairs
- In office 1 October 1969 – 29 May 1978
- Premier: Yen Chia-kan; Chiang Ching-kuo; Hsu Ching-chung (acting)
- Preceded by: Tao Shen-yang
- Succeeded by: Chang Shih-kuang

7th Minister of Transportation and Communications
- In office 29 November 1967 – 1 October 1969
- Premier: Yen Chia-kan
- Preceded by: Yi Shen
- Succeeded by: Chang Chi-cheng

Personal details
- Born: 10 November 1913 Penglai, Shandong, Republic of China
- Died: 15 February 2006 (aged 92) Taipei, Taiwan, Republic of China
- Resting place: Hsin Hsin Cemetery, Keelung
- Party: Kuomintang
- Spouse: Yu Hui-hsuen
- Children: 4
- Education: Harbin Institute of Technology (BE)

Sun Yun-suan (Chinese: 孫運璿; pinyin: Sūn Yùnxuán; 10 November 1913 – 15 February 2006) was a Taiwanese engineer and politician. As minister of economic affairs from 1969 to 1978 and Premier of the Republic of China from 1978 to 1984, he was credited for overseeing the export-driven industrialization of Taiwan. An electrical engineer trained in Harbin and at the Tennessee Valley Authority, he restored Taiwan's war-damaged power grid after 1945 and later became president of the Taiwan Power Company. As economics minister and premier, he helped carry out the Ten Major Construction Projects, and he established the Industrial Technology Research Institute and the Hsinchu Science-based Industrial Park, which later became a center of the world's semiconductor industry. A cerebral hemorrhage in February 1984 ended his political career and disrupted President Chiang Ching-kuo's succession plans, and he then served as a senior adviser to the president until his death.

== Early life ==
Sun Yun-suan was born on 8 December 1913 into an ordinary family in Penglai, Shandong, and was the eldest son. His father, Sun Jung-chang, was away studying law at Chaoyang University in Beijing, and the family depended on the support of relatives.

In 1925, at the suggestion of his father, who was then a judge in Harbin and believed that China needed engineers and Russian speakers, Sun moved to Harbin and enrolled at a school for the children of Russian émigrés, where he was the only Chinese pupil. In 1927, at the age of 14, he entered the preparatory course of the Sino-Russian Industrial University (now the Harbin Institute of Technology). He studied electrical engineering and graduated first in his class in May 1934.

== Engineering career (1934–1945) ==
Because the Japanese-controlled authorities of Manchukuo discouraged graduates from leaving for China proper, Sun left Harbin in 1934 disguised as a merchant. He joined his father in Tianjin and then worked on the construction of a power plant at Lianyungang, Jiangsu. In 1936, a paper he published in the journal of the Chinese Institute of Engineers caught the attention of the electrical engineer Yun Zhen, who recruited him to the Nationalist government's National Resources Commission to help build a power plant at Xiangtan, Hunan.

During the Second Sino-Japanese War, Sun helped to dismantle and relocate power plants ahead of the Japanese advance. He organized a mule caravan that took three months to carry the Lianyungang plant's boilers from Shaanxi over the Qinling and Daba Mountains to Zigong, Sichuan. He was then sent to Xining, Qinghai, where, after a year of negotiation with the provincial governor Ma Bufang, he built the area's first power plant and became its director in 1940. In 1942, he was one of 31 engineers selected by the National Resources Commission for training in the United States, where he studied at the Tennessee Valley Authority until the end of the war.

== Taiwan Power Company (1945–1964) ==
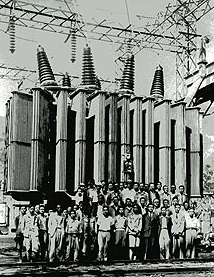
Sun (fourth from right, in a suit) with technical-school students who helped to restore Taiwan's power supply

In late 1945, Sun was due to fly to Northeast China to take part in the takeover of industry there, but he was asked at the last minute to stay behind in Chongqing to look after visiting American engineers. He later said that the change of plan had saved his life. In November 1945, the National Resources Commission instead appointed him to the team taking over Taiwan's electricity system, and he arrived in Taiwan on 20 December 1945.

When the Taiwan Power Company (Taipower) was founded on 1 May 1946, Sun became head of its mechanical and electrical department, in charge of repairing the island's power system. Allied bombing had reduced generating output to about a quarter of its 1943 peak. When Japanese staff were repatriated in 1946, they predicted that Taiwan would be in darkness within three months. Sun recruited three to four hundred senior students from the technical schools in Tainan and Taipei, and within five months they had restored about 80 per cent of the island's power supply. The historian Lin Lan-fang describes him as a key figure in Taipower's transition from Japanese to American technology. During the February 28 incident in 1947, Sun spent a week hiding in the home of a Taiwanese colleague.

Sun became Taipower's chief engineer in 1950. He negotiated a US$2 million loan from Westinghouse, which financed projects including the Wulai hydroelectric plant, the first in Taiwan to be designed and installed locally. After the outbreak of the Korean War, the United States expanded its aid to Taiwan's power industry, and by 1957, Taipower's generating capacity had doubled. Sun also set the company's long-term policy of relying mainly on thermal rather than hydroelectric power. From 1953, he was also Taipower's assistant general manager. In 1959, he graduated in the first class of the National Defense Research Institute. He became general manager in 1962. He secured American support for the development of the Dajia River and the planning of the Techi Reservoir, and introduced management by objectives. A rural electrification programme raised Taiwan's electrification rate to 99.7 per cent, higher than those of Japan and South Korea at the time.

In 1964, at the invitation of the World Bank, Sun became general manager of the Electricity Corporation of Nigeria. During his three years there, he led an international team on the Niger River hydroelectric project, and Nigeria's generating output rose by 87 per cent. He resigned in 1967 and returned to Taiwan because his mother was seriously ill. According to Taiwan's Ministry of Foreign Affairs, he turned down a pay rise and a job offer from the World Bank when President Chiang Kai-shek called him home.

== Minister of Transportation and Economic Affairs (1967–1978) ==
At the end of 1967, Sun became Minister of Transportation and Communications in the cabinet of Yen Chia-kan. He launched a programme to build roads to every village, and he oversaw the planning of several of the Ten Major Construction Projects, including the North-link railway, the international airport at Taoyuan, Taichung Harbor, Su'ao Port, railway electrification and the north–south freeway.

In 1969, after the sudden death of Tao Sheng-yang, Chiang Kai-shek made Sun Minister of Economic Affairs. Taiwan's per capita gross national product was then US$320. Taiwan recorded its first trade surplus in 1970, but the loss of the UN seat in 1971 and the 1973 oil crisis badly shook confidence in the economy. Sun led a delegation to Saudi Arabia that secured oil supplies in exchange for economic co-operation. He had at first insisted on price controls, but he later joined Li Kwoh-ting in recommending a single, full price increase to break inflationary expectations.

=== Industrial Technology Research Institute ===
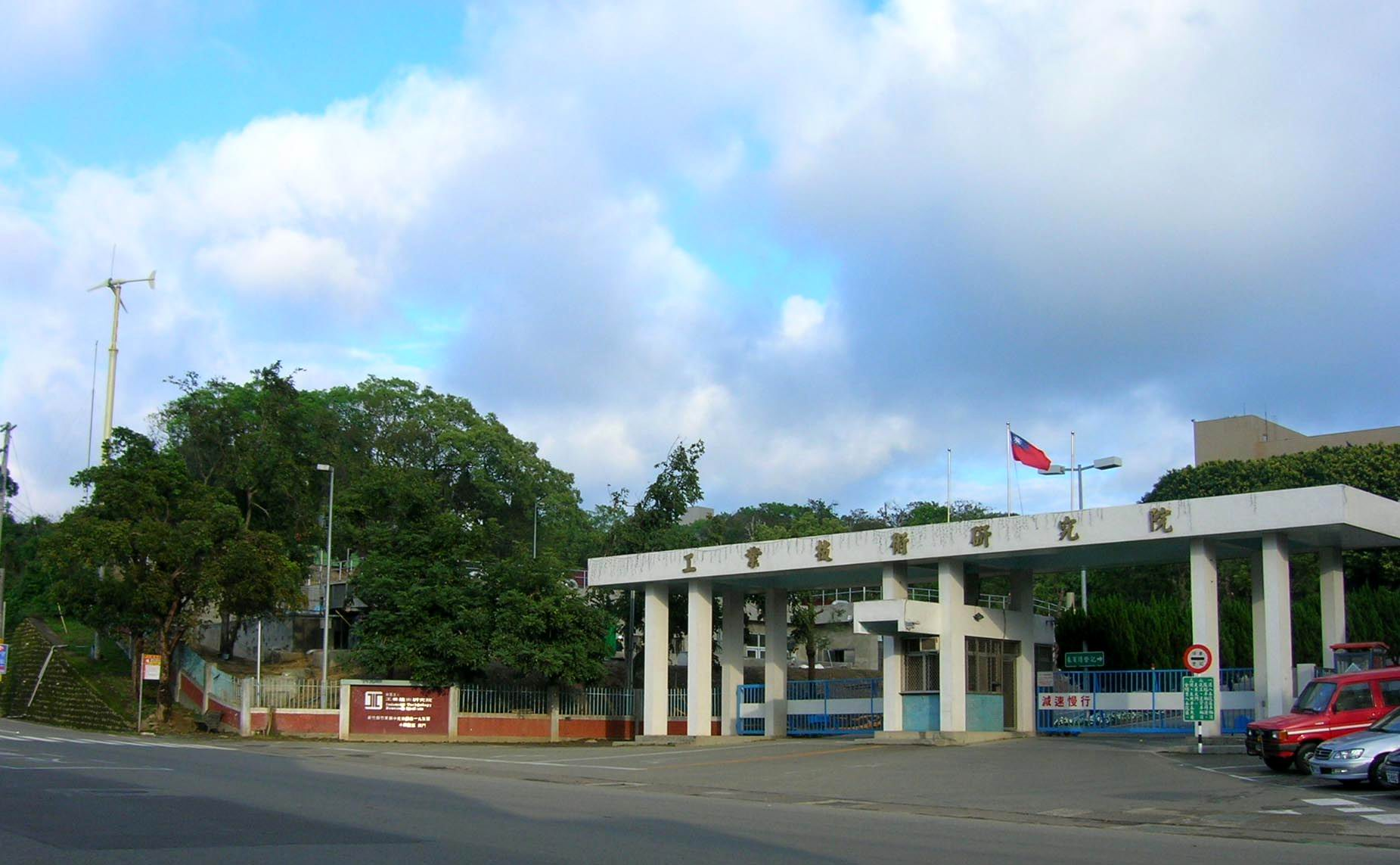
Main gate of the Industrial Technology Research Institute

In 1973, Sun founded the Industrial Technology Research Institute (ITRI) by merging three research centres under the Ministry of Economic Affairs. He visited South Korea's Korea Institute of Science and Technology four times between 1970 and 1976, and the Korean scholar Son Key-young has argued that it was the model for ITRI. ITRI was set up as a government-funded foundation outside legislative supervision and regulatory restrictions, so that it could operate with autonomy. Sun pushed the bill through the Legislative Yuan despite the opposition of about a third of its members. He is often called the "father of ITRI".

On 7 February 1974, at a breakfast meeting at the Hsiao Hsin Hsin soy-milk shop in Taipei, Sun and a small group of officials and engineers, including Fei Hua, secretary-general of the Executive Yuan (the cabinet), and Pan Wen-yuan of RCA, agreed to make semiconductors a focus of Taiwan's economic development. Sun then approved a four-year, US$10 million project to develop integrated circuits, and Pan helped to arrange a technology agreement with RCA. RCA supplied ITRI with complete production technology and trained a group of 37 Taiwanese engineers. The project faced opposition from technology officials and overseas experts, and Sun took on much of the political pressure needed to push it through. In a Christmas card to Pan in 1975, he wrote that the project would succeed and urged Pan to ignore resistance from outside.

Sun also worked with Li Kwoh-ting on preparations for the Hsinchu Science Park, which was established in 1980. ITRI later incubated TSMC and UMC. Morris Chang, a veteran of Texas Instruments, moved to Taiwan in 1985 to head ITRI, and he founded TSMC in 1987. Chang later said that he would not have returned to Taiwan without Sun's invitation.

== Premier (1978–1984) ==
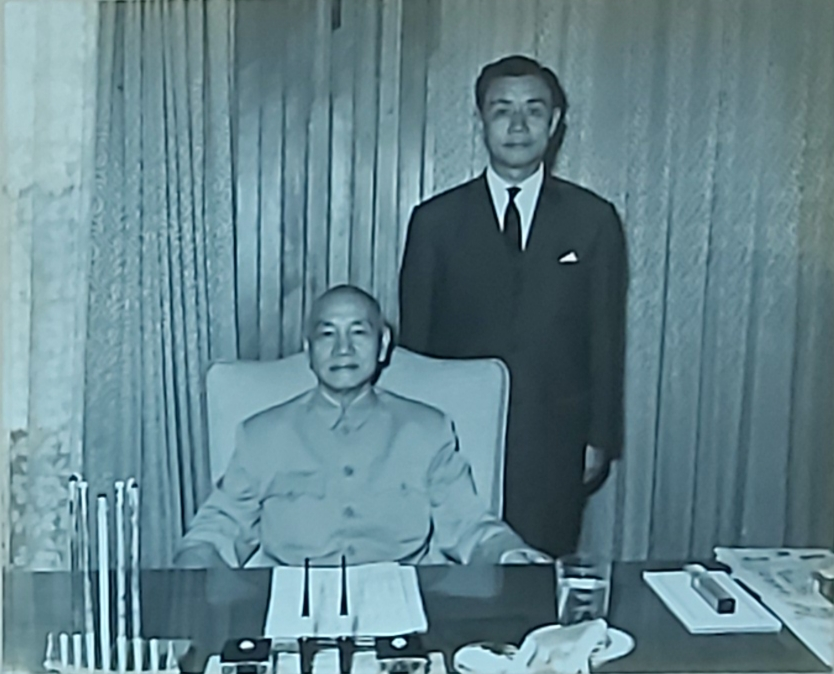
Sun (standing, rear) with President Chiang Kai-shek

After Chiang Ching-kuo became President in 1978, he appointed Sun Premier. Sun took office on 1 June 1978. In a telegram to Chiang, Soong Mei-ling endorsed the appointment, praising Sun's record and character. In December 1978, he was also briefly acting foreign minister.

Sun led the cabinet through the United States' switch of diplomatic recognition to Beijing at the end of 1978. He rejected Beijing's calls for peace talks, describing them in January 1979 as a tactic to induce surrender. In February 1981, he told The Christian Science Monitor that "no talk with the Chinese communist regime is the basic position of my government" and that the policy would never change. In a speech on 10 June 1982, he called on the Communists to abandon their "four principles" and accept Sun Yat-sen's Three Principles of the People, and he said that China's future should be decided by the Chinese people as a whole. He suggested that conditions for reunification could gradually mature as the gap between the mainland and Taiwan narrowed, but he gave no direct answer to Beijing's proposals for talks.

The Ten Major Construction Projects were completed by 1980. In 1980, Sun's government launched a second set of development projects, which extended to culture, education and social welfare as well as further nuclear power plants, railways and new towns. His cabinet's 1979 science and technology development plan named eight priority sectors. He approved the founding of the Synchrotron Radiation Research Center, and he credited the chemist Lee Yuan-tseh with persuading him to invest in basic science.

In 1979, Sun's cabinet adopted a comprehensive development plan for Taiwan that designated areas including Yushan, Kenting, Xueshan and Taroko for future national parks. Kenting National Park, Taiwan's first, opened on 1 September 1982. In 1982, his government launched a NT$20 billion programme to strengthen rural infrastructure and narrow the income gap between farmers and other workers. By the time Sun left office in 1984, per capita gross national product had reached about US$3,000.

=== Succession ===
Sun was widely expected to be nominated as Chiang Ching-kuo's vice-president in 1984, but on 15 February 1984, Chiang chose Lee Teng-hui instead, and Sun remained Premier. According to the diary of the Chief of the General Staff Hau Pei-tsun, Chiang told him in March 1984 that he had intended Sun to be the next president. Others have interpreted Chiang's intentions differently. Some observers believe that Sun would have become president if he had not suffered a stroke.

== Later life ==
On 24 February 1984, while preparing a policy report for the Legislative Yuan, Sun suffered a cerebral haemorrhage. Surgery was delayed while the specialist Yu Nan-keng was flown in from the United States, and Sun was operated on early on 26 February. He stepped down as Premier and became a senior adviser to the President, a post he held until his death. He used a wheelchair for the rest of his life.

In 1996, his former colleagues, including Hsu Li-teh, Morris Chang and Robert Tsao, founded the Sun Yun-suan Academic Foundation, which honours outstanding civil servants and supports public policy research. He remained a senior adviser under President Chen Shui-bian of the Democratic Progressive Party after 2000. He supported the Kuomintang in his later years, backing Ma Ying-jeou's campaign for mayor of Taipei in 1998 and Lien Chan's presidential campaign in 2004. His last public appearance was on 16 August 2005, when Ma received his certificate of election as chairman of the Kuomintang.

Sun was admitted to hospital in January 2006 with heart and lung complications. He died of heart failure at Taipei Veterans General Hospital on 15 February 2006, aged 92. Chen Shui-bian called him the creator of Taiwan's "economic miracle" and issued a presidential citation in his honour. His funeral was held on 25 February 2006. His ashes were interred in Qidu District, Keelung.

== Personal life ==
Sun married Yu Hui-hsuan in Shanghai in 1947, and they had four children. Their daughter Sun Lu-hsi became a professor of food science at National Taiwan University. Shortly after the wedding, Sun's father visited him in Taiwan, but he returned to Shandong as the civil war intensified, and the two never met again. Sun converted to Christianity at the age of 74.

== Legacy ==
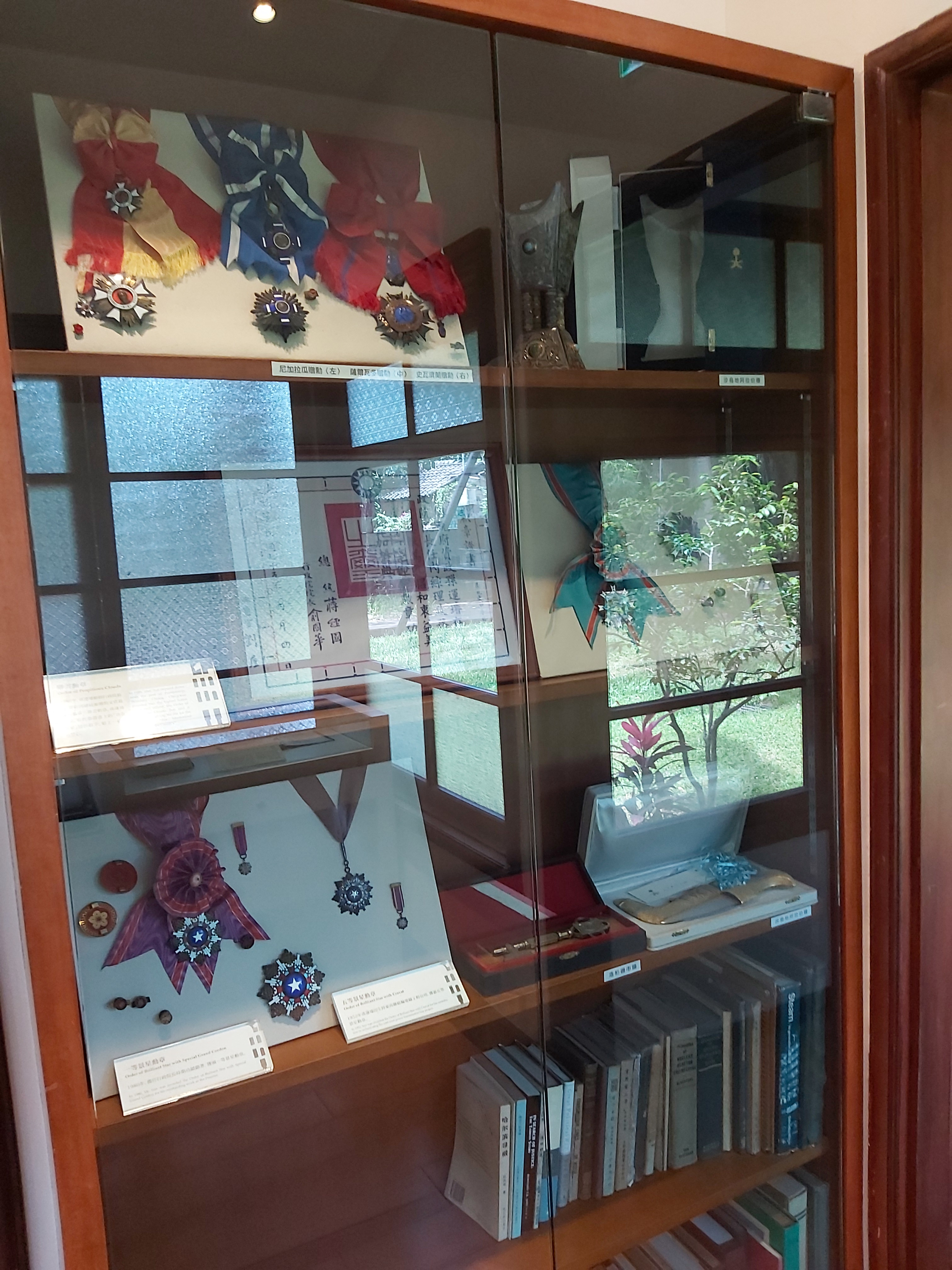
Display of Sun's decorations at his former residence, now a museum

Sun is widely credited, together with Li Kwoh-ting, as one of the architects of Taiwan's economic development. After his death, a statement from Chen Shui-bian's office described them both as driving forces behind the "economic miracle". His death prompted a wave of public tributes in Taiwan. An authorized biography of Sun by Yang Ai-li was published by CommonWealth in 1989, and by 1994, it had been reprinted more than 100 times. Taiwan's Ministry of Foreign Affairs has described his personal integrity as his greatest legacy, noting that he owned no house, land or car after leaving office.

The "eight key technologies" designated for development by his government were criticized at the time as too broad and as having been chosen without wide consultation. The former legislator Lin Cho-shui argued that the protectionist conditions set by Sun and other officials led Taiwan to partner with Ford rather than Toyota, which held back the development of its car industry. Hsu Tain-tsair recalled Sun saying that Taiwan was still too poor to worry about environmental protection. Sun himself later said that his greatest regret was having focused on economic growth at the expense of cultural and moral education.

Sun lived from 1980 until his death in a 1920s house in Taipei, which the city government designated a municipal historic site in 2006. It opened as the Sun Yun-suan Memorial Museum on 30 October 2014. National Tsing Hua University named a lecture hall in its TSMC Building after him in 2008 and holds the Sun Yun-suan Technology Lecture series there. National Cheng Kung University in Tainan named its green building research centre, also known as the Magic School of Green Technology, after him. His childhood home in Penglai is a protected heritage site of Shandong province.

Political offices
Preceded by Chiang Ching-kuo	Premier of the Republic of China; 1978–1984	Succeeded by Yu Kuo-hwa
Preceded by Tao Sheng-yang	Minister of Economic Affairs of the Republic of China; 1969–1978	Succeeded by Chang Kuang-shih
