= Yu Ching-tang =

Taiwanese politician

- 余井塘
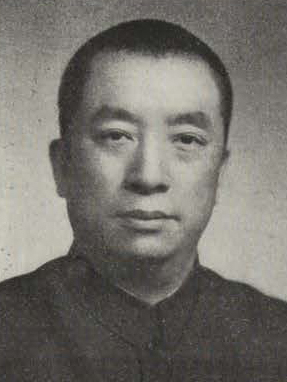

Vice Premier of the Republic of China
- In office 16 December 1963 – 1 June 1966
- Premier: Yen Chia-kan
- Preceded by: Wang Yunwu
- Succeeded by: Huang Shao-ku

Personal details
- Born: 1896
- Died: 2 September 1985 (aged 88–89) Taipei, Taiwan
- Party: Kuomintang
- Education: Fudan University

Yu Ching-tang ([y̌ tɕìŋ tʰǎŋ]; Chinese: 余井塘; pinyin: Yú Jǐngtáng) was a Taiwanese politician. He was the Vice Premier from 1963 to 1966.

== Vice Premiership ==
=== Resignation ===
During an extraordinary session of the Standing Committee of the Central Executive Committee of the Kuomintang on 1 June 1966, Vice Premier Yu resigned from his position for health reasons and was succeeded by Huang Shao-ku.

== See also ==
- List of vice premiers of the Republic of China
