= Hsu Ching-chung =

Taiwanese agricultural scientist and politician (1907–1996)

- 徐慶鐘
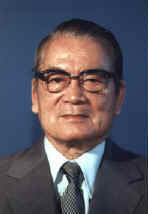
- Official portrait, 1972

Senior Advisor to the President
- In office December 1981 – 13 March 1996
- President: Chiang Ching-kuo; Lee Teng-hui

Acting Premier of the Republic of China
- In office 20 May 1978 – 1 June 1978
- President: Chiang Ching-kuo
- Preceded by: Chiang Ching-kuo
- Succeeded by: Sun Yun-suan

12th Vice Premier of the Republic of China
- In office 1 June 1972 – 1 December 1981
- Premier: Chiang Ching-kuo; Himself (acting); Sun Yun-suan
- Preceded by: Chiang Ching-kuo
- Succeeded by: Chiu Chuang-huan

11th Minister of the Interior
- In office 3 June 1966 – 1 June 1972
- Premier: Yen Chia-kan
- Preceded by: Lien Chen-tung
- Succeeded by: Lin Chin-sheng

Minister without Portfolio
- In office 3 June 1966 – 1 June 1972
- Premier: Yen Chia-kan

Personal details
- Born: 19 July 1907 Taihoku, Taiwan, Empire of Japan
- Died: 13 March 1996 (aged 88) Taipei, Taiwan
- Party: Kuomintang
- Education: National Taiwan University (BS, PhD)

Hsu Ching-chung (Chinese: 徐慶鐘; pinyin: Xú Qìngzhōng; 19 July 1907 – 13 March 1996) was a Taiwanese agricultural scientist and politician. He was the vice premier of Taiwan from 1972 to 1981 and acting premier of Taiwan in 1978

== Early life and education ==
Born in Taipei in 1907, Hsu was of Hakka ancestry from Jiaoling, Meizhou, Guangdong, China. He graduated from National Taiwan University with a bachelor's degree in agriculture in 1931 and earned his Ph.D. in agriculture from the university in 1945.

== Political career ==
Hsu was the Minister of the Interior in 1966–1972 and Vice Premier in 1972–1981.

== Death ==
Hsu died in 1996.
