= Wang Yun-wu =

Chinese scholar and politician (1888–1979)

- 王雲五
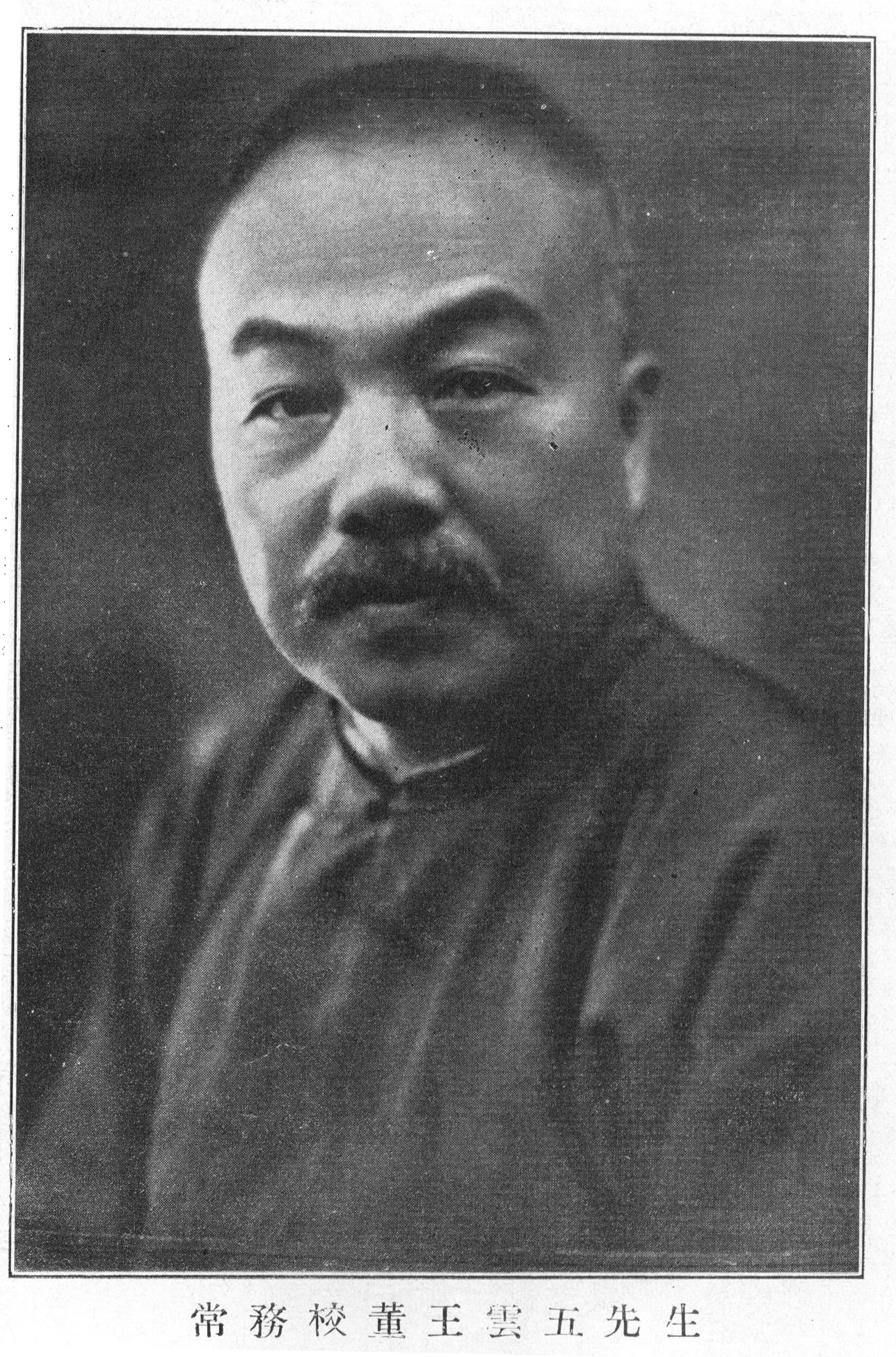

Vice Premier of China
- In office 18 April 1947 – 24 May 1948
- Premier: Chang Ch'un
- Preceded by: Huang Shao-ku
- Succeeded by: Ku Meng-yu

Minister of Finance
- In office 1 June 1948 – 15 November 1948
- Preceded by: Yu Hung-chun
- Succeeded by: Hsu Kan

Vice Premier of the Republic of China
- In office 15 July 1958 – 16 December 1963
- Premier: Chen Cheng
- Preceded by: Huang Shao-ku
- Succeeded by: Yu Ching-tang

Personal details
- Born: 9 July 1888 Shanghai, China
- Died: 14 August 1979 (aged 91) Taipei, Taiwan
- Occupation: Scholar; editor; politician

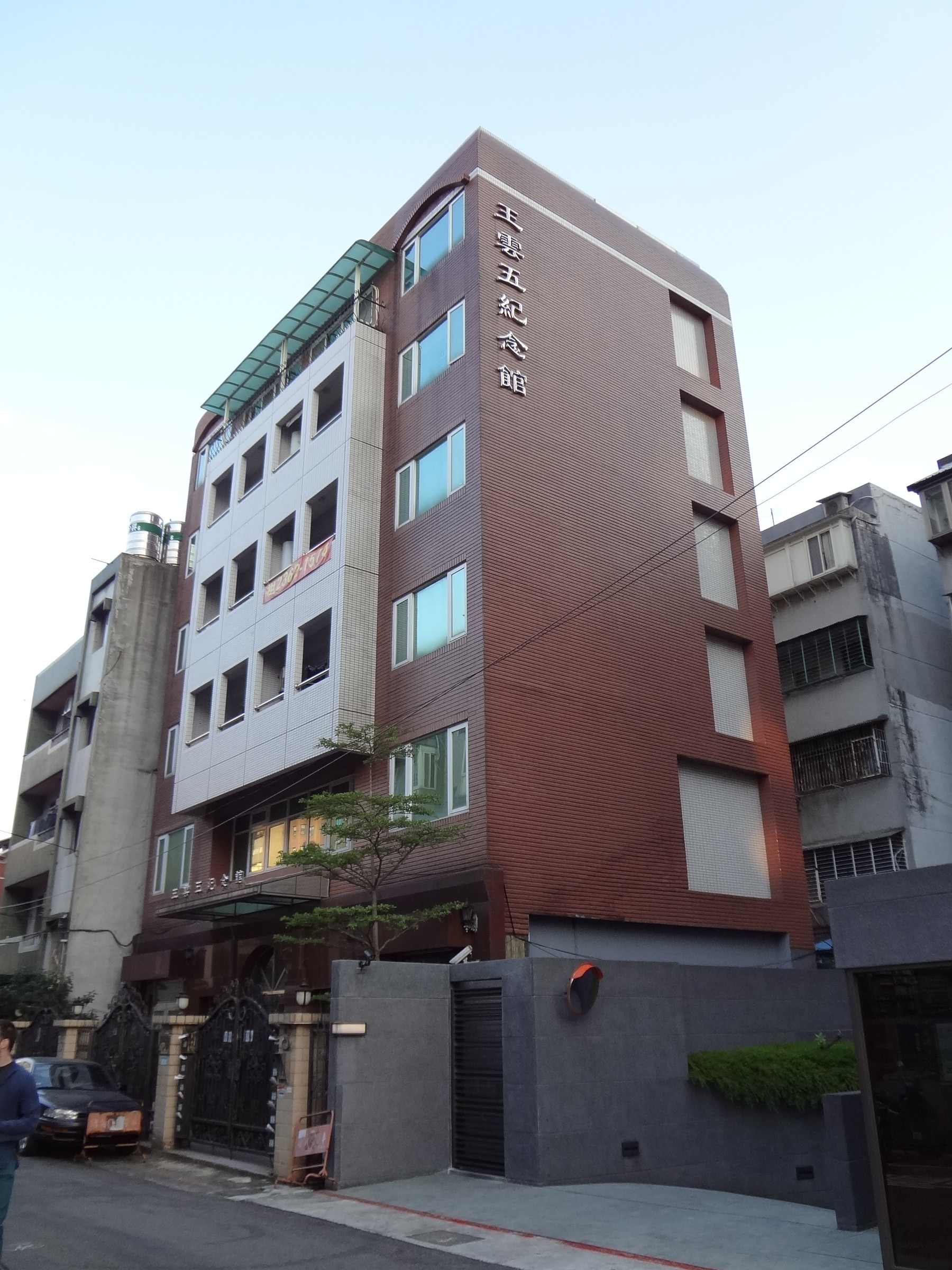
Wang Yun-wu Memorial Hall in Taipei.

Wang Yun-wu ([wǎŋ y̌n ù]; Chinese: 王雲五; pinyin: Wáng Yúnwǔ; July 9, 1888 – August 14, 1979) was an influential Chinese publisher, politician, and scholar of history and political science. He invented the Shih Chiao Hao Ma, a method of Chinese lexicography also sometimes referred to as the Four Corner Method.

== Career ==
In the 1920s when Wang Yun-wu was the editor in chief at The Commercial Press, one of the oldest book enterprises in China, he invented the Four Corner Method. During his tenure, he edited the 4,000-volume collectanea Wanyou Wenku (萬有文庫), the Oriental Magazine (東方雜誌社), and co-curated the Oriental Library (東方圖書館), one of the largest private libraries in the country prior to its destruction by Japanese bombing in 1932.

On May 31, 1948, during the Chinese Civil War, he was appointed by Chiang Kai-shek to lead the Ministry of Finance. After the Chinese Civil War he moved to Taipei with his family. In 1972 Wang Yun-wu presided over the opening of the Sun Yat-sen Memorial Hall in Taipei on behalf of the government.

On August 14, 1987, to commemorate his historical achievement his picture (as above) was placed on the NT$2 Stamp of which 4 million units were printed in Taiwan.
