= Yu Hung-chun =

Chinese political figure (1898–1960)

- 俞鴻鈞
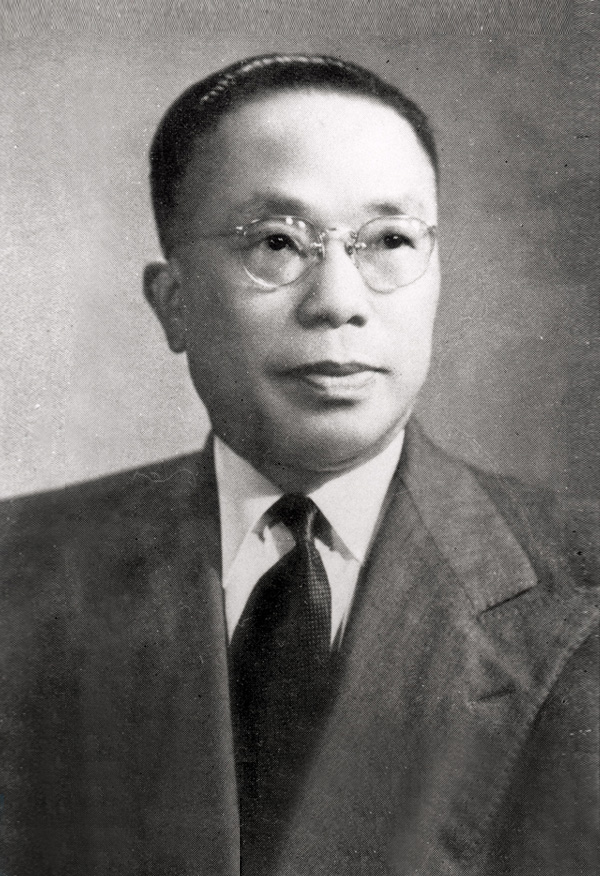

Premier of the Republic of China
- In office 7 June 1954 – 30 June 1958
- President: Chiang Kai-shek
- Vice Premier: Huang Shao-ku
- Preceded by: Chen Cheng
- Succeeded by: Chen Cheng

4th Chairman of the Taiwan Provincial Government
- In office 16 April 1953 – 7 June 1954

Mayor of Shanghai
- In office April 1937 – November 1937
- Preceded by: Wu Tiecheng

Personal details
- Born: 4 January 1898 Xinhui county, Szeyap, Guangdong, China
- Died: 1 June 1960 (aged 62) Taipei, Taiwan
- Education: St. John's University, Shanghai (BA)

Chinese name
- Traditional Chinese: 俞鴻鈞
Transcriptions
Standard Mandarin
- Hanyu Pinyin: Yú Hóngjūn
- Bopomofo: ㄩˊㄏㄨㄥˊㄐㄩㄣ
- Wade–Giles: Yü^{2} Hung^{2}-chün^{1}
Wu
- Wugniu: Yu^{6} Ghon^{6}-jyn^{1}
other Yue
- Taishanese: Yi^{3} Huung^{3}-gun^{1}
Southern Min
- Tâi-lô: Lû Hông-kun

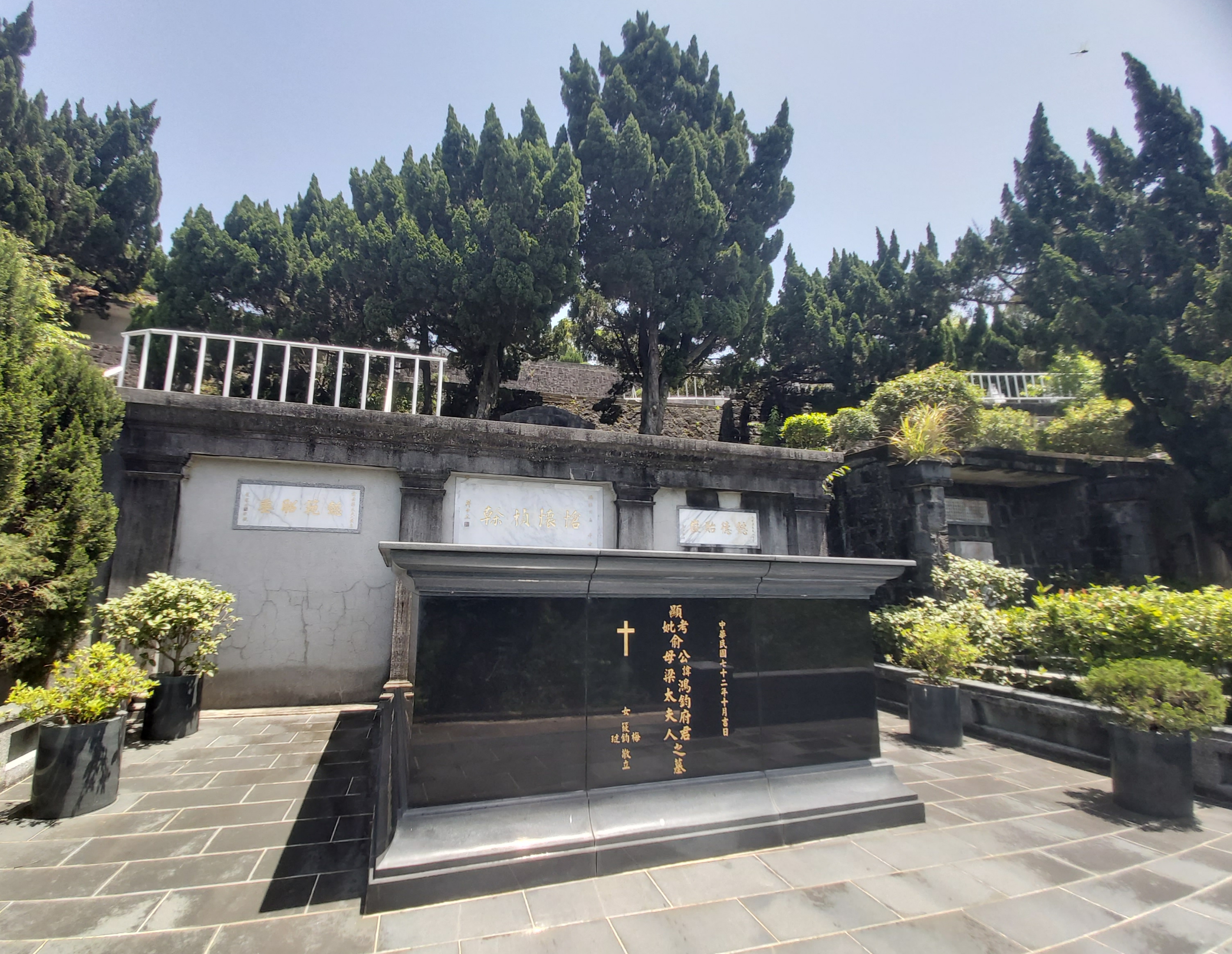
Tomb of Yu Hung-chun in Yangmingshan Cemetery, Taipei.

Yu Hung-chun (Chinese: 俞鴻鈞; pinyin: Yú Hóngjūn; 4 January 1898 – 1 June 1960), also known as O. K. Yui, was a Chinese political figure who served as mayor of Shanghai, chairman of the Taiwan Provincial Government and Premier of the Republic of China. He graduated from Saint Johns University in Shanghai, having majored in English Literature. He was later appointed Mayor of Shanghai. During World War II he negotiated unsuccessfully with the Japanese not to expand military conflict. He was appointed Director of Central Trust, Deputy minister of Foreign Affairs, and later became Minister of Department of Treasury. Yu replaced H.H. Kung as minister of finance in November 1944, following H.H. Kung's removal for corruption. Immediately before he replaced Kung, Yu served as vice minister of finance. Later he was appointed Central Bank and started moving the gold reserve to Taiwan from China to keep it away from the advancing communists. He was COO of Central, Farmer and Communication Banks, In 1954 he was appointed Governor of Taiwan Province. Then he was in charge of Executive Yuan from 1954 to 1958. Yu offered to resign when an Anti-American demonstration at US Embassy went out of control. Later he refused to appeal at court resigned and went back to Central Bank as an executive. In 1960 he died of an asthma attack at age 62.

His great-granddaughter is Michelle Dee, a Filipino actress and model.

== Chronology ==
- 23 March 1937 – the Executive Yuan resolved that Yu Hung-chun may act as mayor of Shanghai.
- 27 July 1937 – the Nationalist Government appointed Yu Hung-chun as mayor of Shanghai.
- 30 June 1958 – resigned as the president of the Executive Yuan.(Premier of the Republic of China)
- 1958 – appointed President of Central Bank.

Government offices
Preceded by Wu Tiecheng	Mayor of Shanghai; 1937	Succeeded by Chen Gongbo
Preceded by K. C. Wu	Chairman of the Taiwan Provincial Government; 1953–1954	Succeeded by Yen Chia-kan
Preceded by Chen Cheng	Premier of the Republic of China; 1954–1958	Succeeded by Chen Cheng
