= Chow Shu-kai =

Taiwanese diplomat and politician

Chow Shu-kai 周書楷

Ambassador of the Republic of China to the Holy See
- In office 5 January 1978 – 15 March 1991
- Preceded by: Chen Chih-Mai
- Succeeded by: Hoang Sieou-je

Minister of Foreign Affairs of the Republic of China
- In office 31 March 1971 – 1 June 1972
- Preceded by: Wei Tao-ming
- Succeeded by: Shen Chang-huan

Ambassador of the Republic of China to the United States
- In office 5 May 1965 – 12 April 1971
- Preceded by: Tsiang Tingfu
- Succeeded by: James Shen

Ambassador of the Republic of China to Spain
- In office 23 October 1962 – 5 May 1965
- Preceded by: Huang Shao-ku
- Succeeded by: Chu Fu-sung

Chairman of the Overseas Community Affairs Council
- In office 30 May 1960 – 22 November 1962
- Preceded by: Chen Ching-wen
- Succeeded by: Kao Hsin

Personal details
- Born: 21 August 1913 Anlu, Hubei, China
- Died: 31 July 1992 (aged 78) Taipei, Taiwan
- Party: Kuomintang
- Education: National Central University; Cambridge University; University of London (MA)

Chinese name
- Traditional Chinese: 周書楷
- Simplified Chinese: 周书楷
Transcriptions
Standard Mandarin
- Hanyu Pinyin: Zhōu Shūkǎi
- Gwoyeu Romatzyh: Jou Shu Kaai
- Wade–Giles: Chou^{1} Shu^{1}-k'ai^{3}
Wu
- Romanization: Tszeu Sy Ckai
Yue: Cantonese
- Jyutping: Zau^{1} Syu^{1} kaai^{2}
Southern Min
- Hokkien POJ: Chiu Su-khái

Chow Shu-kai (Chinese: 周書楷; 21 August 1913 – 31 July 1992) was a Taiwanese diplomat and politician who served as Minister of Foreign Affairs of the Republic of China from 1971 to 1972. He subsequently served as Ambassador of the Republic of China to the United States, Spain and the Holy See. He also chaired the Overseas Community Affairs Council from 1960 to 1962.

== Early life and education ==
Chow was born on 21 August 1913 in Anlu, Hubei, China, into a family with a scholarly tradition. His grandfather was a private-school teacher. His father had been trained as a scholar but, dissatisfied with the corruption of the Qing government, pursued a military career. In 1925, he served as chief of staff of the division commanded by General Yu Xuezhong.

His father established a private school at home and arranged for teachers from Anlu to teach Chow Chinese and English. At the age of 16, Chow left Anlu to attend Hubei Provincial No. 3 High School in Hankou. He ranked among the school's top students throughout his three years there. In 1931, at the age of 18, he entered the Department of Political Science at National Central University in Nanjing. He subsequently won first place in Chinese and English competitions organized by the Ministry of Education among students from ten universities in southeastern China.

== Diplomatic career ==
=== Early diplomatic career ===
After graduating in the summer of 1935, Chow was recommended by his teachers for a position with the League of Nations Association of China. The association was chaired by Chu Chia-hua, then president of National Central University, and its board included Han Lih-wu, head of the university's political science department.

In the summer of 1938, on the recommendation of Chu and Han, Chow joined the Chinese delegation to the World Youth Congress Movement in New York City. The delegation sought to publicize China's situation during the Second Sino-Japanese War and obtain international support for China. After several weeks in the United States, Chow accepted an invitation from the British delegation to travel to London, where he remained until the winter of 1938. In February 1939, Chow travelled to Berlin. While preparing to travel by train to Marseille to return to China, he received a telegram from Han informing him that the Ministry of Foreign Affairs had agreed to employ him and instructing him to return to London to await further orders.

=== Embassy in London (1939–1945) ===
Chow reported to the Chinese embassy in London on 9 March 1939 as a "Class A trainee" (甲種學習員). Under the trainee programme, he studied political science at the University of London, where he obtained a master's degree, and subsequently studied modern European diplomatic history at the University of Cambridge. He was later appointed an attaché and, in 1941, became a specialist officer at the embassy. He also served as vice-consul in Manchester.

Wellington Koo became Chinese ambassador to the United Kingdom in July 1941 and appointed Chow as his personal secretary in 1943. In that capacity, Chow assisted Koo in receiving visiting Chinese officials, including T. V. Soong and Wang Shih-chieh. In the autumn of 1944, Koo led the Chinese delegation to the Dumbarton Oaks Conference, where representatives of the Soviet Union, the United States, the United Kingdom and China discussed the establishment of the United Nations. Chow accompanied Koo as an assistant and participated in work related to the drafting of the United Nations Charter. In 1945, the foreign ministers of the Soviet Union, the United States, the United Kingdom, France and China held their first conference in London. China's five-member delegation was led by Foreign Minister Wang Shih-chieh and included Koo. Wang appointed Chow as his secretary. At the end of 1945, Chow returned to China, where he continued serving as Wang's secretary.

=== Post-war career (1946–1960) ===
From 1946 to early 1947, Chow's principal assignment was to serve as interpreter for General George C. Marshall, the United States special envoy, during the three-party talks involving the Nationalist government, the Chinese Communist Party and the United States. The Nationalist government was represented by Chang Chun and later Chang Chih-chung, while the Chinese Communist Party was represented by Zhou Enlai. In 1946, Chow also attended the 21-nation Paris Peace Conference as an adviser and spokesman for the Chinese delegation.

With the support of Wang Shih-chieh and his successor as foreign minister, George Yeh, Chow advanced through the Ministry of Foreign Affairs, serving successively as a section chief, secretary and senior specialist before becoming deputy director of the Department of Information. Following the retreat of the government of the Republic of China to Taiwan, Chow was posted to the Philippines. He became counsellor at the Republic of China Embassy in Manila in 1950 and counsellor with the rank of minister in 1953. He also served as consul-general in Manila and as chargé d'affaires in the Philippines. In 1956, he was recalled to Taipei and promoted ahead of normal seniority to administrative vice minister of foreign affairs.

=== Overseas Chinese affairs and ambassador to Spain (1960–1965) ===
In the late 1950s and early 1960s, amid a series of anti-Chinese incidents in Southeast Asia, the Republic of China government decided to replace the head of the Overseas Chinese Affairs Commission. According to one account, three candidates were considered, with Chow ranked third. Chiang Kai-shek and Chen Cheng were unable to agree on the other two candidates, after which Chen proposed appointing someone with experience in foreign affairs. Chow was subsequently appointed chairman. He was the first person to hold the position who was not a native of Fujian or Guangdong.

While serving at the commission, Chow continued to receive diplomatic assignments. He was a plenipotentiary delegate to the 16th session of the United Nations General Assembly in September 1961 and to the 17th session in September 1962. In August 1962, he attended the independence celebrations of Madagascar as a special envoy of the President. In November 1962, approximately two and a half years after leaving the foreign ministry, he was appointed ambassador to Spain.

=== Ambassador to the United States (1965–1971) ===
When Tsiang Tingfu resigned as ambassador to the United States, citing his age, three candidates were reportedly considered. Chow was reportedly ranked third behind former foreign minister Shen Chang-huan and former defense minister Yu Ta-wei. Chow was selected after Soong Mei-ling recommended him and Chiang Kai-shek endorsed his appointment. He took up the position in early June 1965 at the age of 52.

In 1970, after democracy activist Peng Ming-min escaped Taiwan, the Republic of China (ROC) government sought to prevent him from travelling to the United States. In August, Chow reported to the Ministry of Foreign Affairs on a conversation with Winthrop G. Brown, a senior U.S. State Department official. Brown warned that if the American government denied Peng entry, American public opinion would criticize both the government and the ROC government. Chow nevertheless stated that he would prefer Peng to be prevented from entering the United States, even at the cost of criticism, arguing that such criticism would eventually subside. Peng ultimately arrived in the United States in September 1970.

=== Minister of Foreign Affairs (1971–1972) ===
In November 1970, during the 25th session of the United Nations General Assembly, a resolution sponsored by Albania and 17 other states seeking to restore the rights of the People's Republic of China (PRC) in the United Nations received a majority for the first time, passing by 51 votes to 49. As the Republic of China's position at the United Nations came under increasing pressure, Chiang Kai-shek accepted the resignation of Foreign Minister Wei Tao-ming. On 31 March 1971, Chow was appointed foreign minister.

During Chow's tenure, the United States and the PRC moved toward closer diplomatic engagement. United States National Security Advisor Henry Kissinger made a secret visit to China, and it was subsequently announced that President Richard Nixon would visit China the following year. Within six months of Chow taking office, eight countries established diplomatic relations with Beijing. In 1971, as international support grew for the People's Republic of China (PRC) to assume China's seat at the United Nations, Chow faced proposals for a "dual representation" arrangement that would have allowed the Republic of China (ROC) to retain its UN membership. Although Chow formally opposed the proposal, he indicated privately that Taiwan could tolerate the PRC's participation, telling the Japanese ambassador that "we can live with it." In May 1971, Chow and National Security Council secretary-general Huang Shao-ku proposed conditions under which the ROC could maintain diplomatic relations with countries that established relations with Beijing. These included requiring such countries not to recognise the PRC as the sole legitimate government of China, not to regard Taiwan as part of the PRC, and to continue recognising the ROC government rather than a separate Taiwanese government.

In September 1971, Chow led the Republic of China delegation to the 26th session of the United Nations General Assembly. A resolution sponsored by the United States and Japan that would have required a two-thirds majority to alter the representation of China was defeated by 59 votes to 55, with 15 abstentions and three members absent. Before the vote on the United Nations General Assembly Resolution 2758, Chow announced that the Republic of China was withdrawing from the United Nations and led the ROC delegation out of the General Assembly before the resolution voting.

The General Assembly subsequently adopted the resolution by 76 votes to 35, with 17 abstentions. The resolution recognized representatives of the government of the People's Republic of China as the representatives of China and expelled the 'representatives of Chiang Kai-shek'. After returning to Taiwan, Chow offered his resignation, but Chiang Kai-shek asked him to remain in government service.

=== Minister without Portfolio (1972–1977) ===
Chow (first from left) with Chiang Ching-kuo at the Ci En Pagoda

In May 1972, Chiang Ching-kuo became Premier. He initially intended to retain Chow as foreign minister, but following objections from Soong Mei-ling, Chow instead remained in government as a Minister without Portfolio of the Executive Yuan.

During this period, Chow's work focused on delaying the establishment of diplomatic relations between the United States and the People's Republic of China. The two countries nevertheless began formal negotiations in Beijing in July 1978. Under the resulting agreement, the United States recognized the PRC government as the sole legal government of China, acknowledged the Chinese position that there was one China, ended diplomatic relations with the Republic of China and established diplomatic relations with the PRC from 1 January 1979.

=== Ambassador to the Holy See (1977–1991) ===
In December 1977, Chow was appointed ambassador of the Republic of China to the Holy See. He took up the post in January 1978 and remained ambassador until he was permitted to step down in March 1991. After returning to Taiwan, Chow served as a National Policy Adviser to President Lee Teng-hui and as an adviser to the Ministry of Foreign Affairs.

== Later life and death ==
After leaving his post at the Holy See and returning to Taiwan in May 1991, Chow no longer took part in diplomatic affairs. He told relatives and friends that he intended to spend more time with his wife and, following the example of Wellington Koo, to compile and publish his memoirs. In August 1990 and June 1992, Chow met his younger sister and his four sons in British Hong Kong. His sons had been living in mainland China, and he had been separated from them for more than 40 years.

Chow died of a heart attack on 31 July 1992 at Taipei Veterans General Hospital, aged 78.

== Personal life ==
Chow was married to Tu Xuezhen (屠雪貞). They had four sons, who remained in mainland China after 1949.

His son Zhou Yate (周亞特), born in Anlu in July 1936, became a member of the central committee of the Revolutionary Committee of the Chinese Kuomintang in China. He later served as chairman of its Huangshi municipal committee and as vice chairman of the Huangshi committee of the Chinese People's Political Consultative Conference.

== Awards and honors ==
- Grand Cross of Order of Isabella the Catholic (Spain, 1965)
