= Zheng Yanfen =

Republic of China politician (1902–1990)

- 鄭彥棻
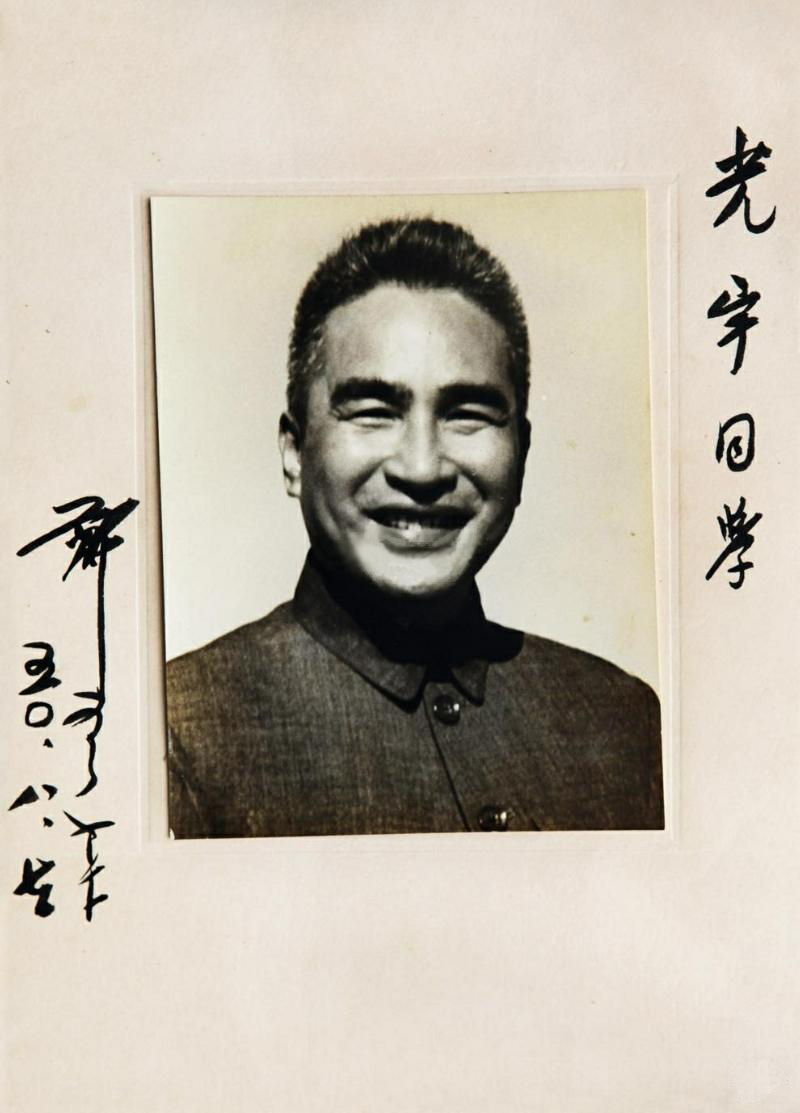

Secretary-General to the President
- In office 29 May 1972 – 19 May 1978
- Preceded by: Zhang Qun
- Succeeded by: Chiang Yen-si

Deputy Secretary-General to the President
- In office 6 December 1967 – 29 May 1972
- Secretary-General: Zhang Qun

Minister of Justice
- In office 1 June 1960 – 6 December 1967
- Preceded by: Gu Fengxiang
- Succeeded by: Zha Liangjian

Minister of the Overseas Chinese Affairs Commission
- In office 16 April 1952 – 16 July 1958
- Preceded by: George Yeh
- Succeeded by: Chen Qingwen

Secretary-General of the Central Executive Committee of the Kuomintang
- In office 1948–1950
- Preceded by: Wu Tiecheng
- Succeeded by: Chang Chi-yun as Secretary-General of the Central Reform Committee

Member of the Legislative Yuan
- In office August 1947 – March 1952
- Preceded by: multi-member district
- Succeeded by: multi-member district
- Constituency: Guangdong 1

Personal details
- Born: 8 February 1902 Shunde, Guangdong, China
- Died: 21 June 1990 (aged 88) Taipei, Taiwan
- Party: Kuomintang
- Spouse: Lun Yunshan (m. 1933; died 1988)
- Education: University of Lyon; University of Paris

Chinese name
- Traditional Chinese: 鄭彥棻
- Simplified Chinese: 郑彦棻
Transcriptions
Standard Mandarin
- Hanyu Pinyin: Zhèng Yànfēn
- Bopomofo: ㄓㄥˋ ㄧㄢˋㄈㄣ
- Wade–Giles: Chêng^{4} Yen^{4}-fên^{1}
Yue: Cantonese
- Jyutping: Zeng^{6} Jin-fan^{1}
Southern Min
- Hokkien POJ: Tēⁿ Gān-hun

Zheng Yanfen (Chinese: 鄭彥棻; 8 February 1902 – 21 June 1990) was a Chinese-born politician affiliated with the Kuomintang. He worked with the League of Nations and supported the Nationalist government. After the government of the Republic of China moved to Taiwan, Zheng led the Overseas Chinese Affairs Commission, was the Minister of Justice, and served as Secretary-General to the President.

== Early life and education ==
Zheng was born on 8 February 1902 in present-day Shunde, Guangdong. His father died when Zheng was six years old. At the age of nine, Zheng began attending a private school and at ten years old moved to a school in Beijiao. Zheng spent 1916 at school in Hong Kong, returning to Guangzhou the next year, and soon found work as a journalist.

He was accepted into a normal school affiliated with National Guangdong University in 1918, and became active in student government, while also serving on the staff of several student publications. Influenced by professor Huang Xisheng, Zheng left the study of math and chemistry, to focus on education instead. Zheng's academic performance caught the attention of school president Zou Lu, who suggested that Zheng join the Kuomintang. Zheng became a member of the party in 1923.

In January 1924, Sun Yat-sen held lectures on his political philosophy, the Three Principles of the People, at Zheng's school. Upon graduation, Zheng chose to further his studies in education in Japan. Upon his return, Zheng worked as a mathematics teacher and department director at National Guangdong University.

== Time in Europe ==
In late 1925, Zheng arrived in France to study at the University of Lyon. By 1926, Zheng became leader of the French chapter of the Kuomintang. From his base in Lyon, he oversaw party operations in several western European countries. In 1927, Zheng transferred to the University of Paris. The next year, he returned to China, attending the Third Kuomintang National Congress in Nanjing. Zheng then became the European bureau chief for the Central Daily News. Zheng formally declared his support of Chiang Kai-shek's Nationalist government in 1930 and began work at the League of Nations.

Zheng completed his degree in statistics from the University of Paris in 1931 and married Lun Yunshan two years later. Shortly thereafter, National Guangdong University Law School dean Guo Guanjie stepped down and Zou Lu offered the position to Zheng, who cited the events of the Fujian Rebellion as a reason he should continue working in government. As a result, Zheng returned to Geneva with his wife in 1934.

== Return to China ==
Zheng left his position at the League of Nations in 1935 and became dean of SYSU Law School until 1937.

After the Second Sino–Japanese War broke out, Zheng sought to aid the war effort, moving from Guangzhou to Shanghai with the assistance of T. V. Soong. The war's opening engagement forced Zheng to Hong Kong. From Hong Kong, Zheng relocated to Wuhan, where he helped organize the Three People's Principles Youth League in 1938, which he served as secretary-general. Zheng was elected to the Guangdong Provincial Government, serving between 1939 and 1943. During this time, Zheng served in several positions within the Kuomintang. He attended the Sixth Kuomintang National Congress, where he was named secretary-general of the party's central committee.

In 1947, Zheng was elected to the Legislative Yuan for the first time. The next year, he succeeded Wu Tieh-cheng as secretary-general of the Kuomintang Central Committee. He won reelection to the legislature after the Constitution of the Republic of China went into effect. In April 1949, Zheng met with several senior members of the Kuomintang to discuss moving party leadership to Guangzhou.

== Career in Taiwan ==
After the Second Chinese Civil War ended, Zheng moved to Taiwan. In January 1950, Zheng, and leading Kuomintang figures Huang Shao-ku, Chen Lifu, Chiang Ching-kuo, and Ku Cheng-kang, among others, met at Sun Moon Lake to discuss party reform. Zheng left the legislature in March 1952, and took office as the Minister of the Overseas Chinese Affairs Commission the next month. After leaving that post in 1958, Zheng returned to public service as Minister of Justice from 1960 to 1967. He was then named deputy secretary-general of the Presidential Office, before succeeding Zhang Qun as Secretary-General in 1972. Zheng was replaced by Chiang Yen-si as secretary-general, and became an adviser to Chiang Ching-kuo, who had become president. In 1979, Chang Chi-yun invited Zheng to join the faculty of Chinese Culture University.

In later life, Zheng was diagnosed with colorectal cancer. His wife died on 12 March 1988 at Tri-Service General Hospital. Zheng died of a cerebral hemorrhage and renal failure at the same hospital on 21 June 1990, aged 88.

Upon learning of Zheng's death, President Lee Teng-hui and Premier Hau Pei-tsun released a joint statement.
