= Minister of Foreign Affairs (Taiwan) =

Republic of China office

Minister of Foreign Affairs of the Republic of China
- 中華民國外交部部長
- Flag of the Republic of China

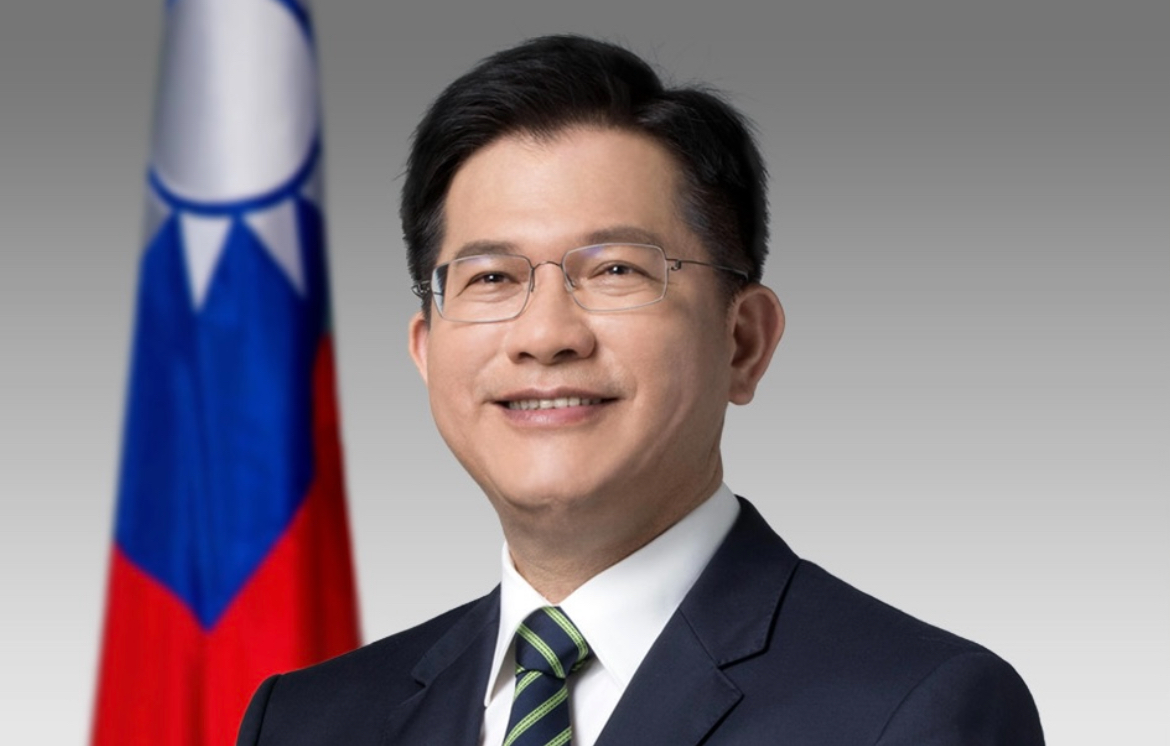
- Incumbent; Lin Chia-lung since 20 May 2024
- Ministry of Foreign Affairs
- Member of: Executive Yuan
- Seat: Taipei
- Nominator: Premier
- Appointer: President
- Inaugural holder: Wang Chonghui
- Formation: 1 January 1912; 114 years ago
- Website: www.mofa.gov.tw

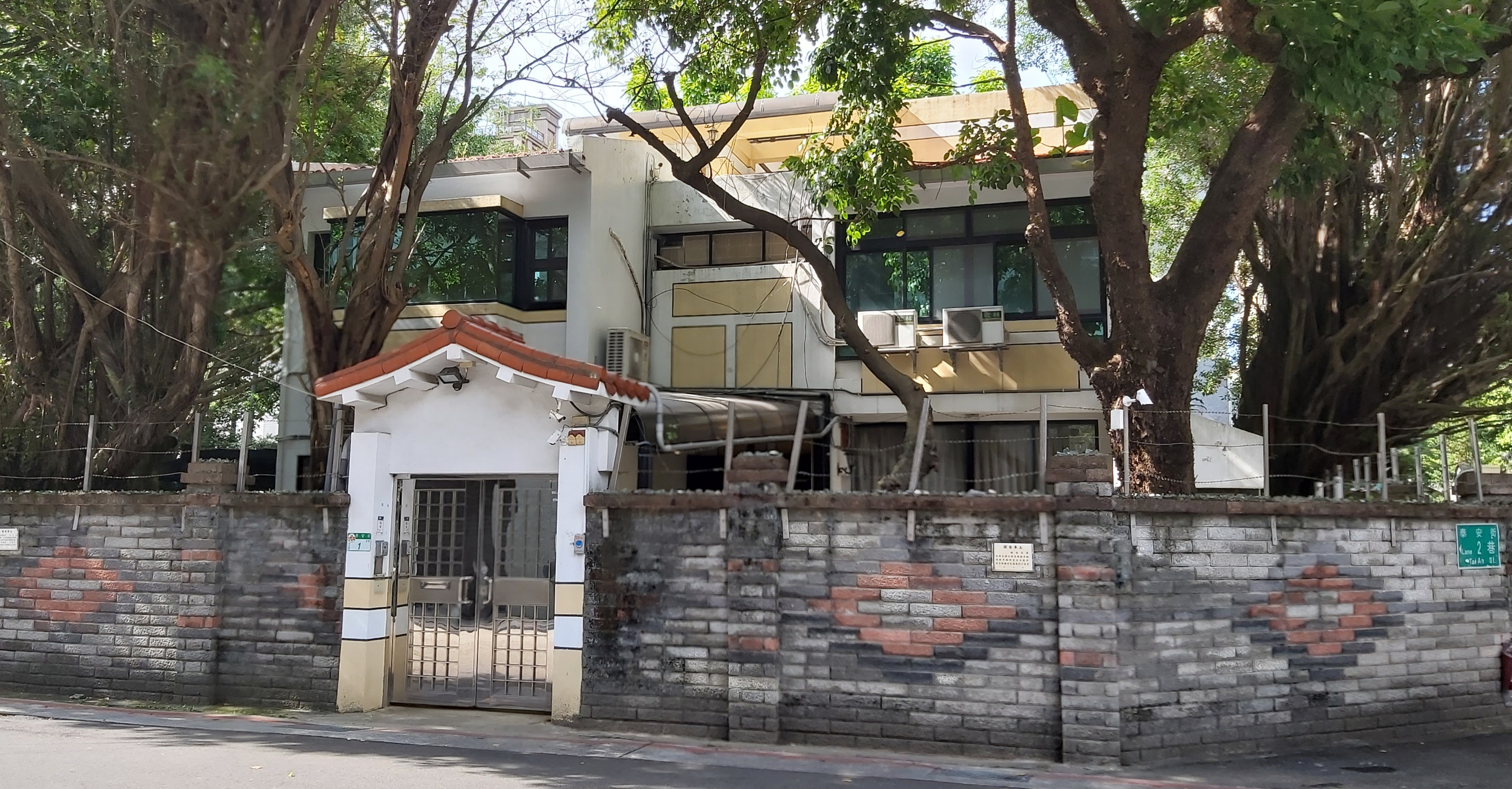
Official residence of Foreign Minister of the Republic of China.

This is a list of foreign ministers of the Republic of China (based in Taiwan since 1949), heading its Ministry of Foreign Affairs.

== Beiyang and Nationalist governments ==
Name	Took office	Left office	Portrait
Lu Zhengxiang	March 1912	September 1912	
Lu Zhengxiang	November 1912	September 1913	
Lu Zhengxiang	27 January 1915	17 May 1916	
Wu Tingfang	7 November 1917	30 November 1917	
Lu Zhengxiang	30 November 1917	13 August 1920	
Chen Lu (acting)	November 1918	December 1919	
Wu Ting-fang	1921	1922	
Wu Chaoshu	1923; 1927	1924; 1928	
Huang Fu	1924		
Chengting T. Wang	June 14, 1928		
Alfred Sao-ke Sze	1931		
Eugene Chen	June 1, 1931		
Luo Wengan	1932		
Wang Jingwei	August 18, 1933		
Zhang Qun	December 12, 1935	March 4, 1937	
Wang Chonghui	March 4, 1937	April 10, 1941	
Guo Taiqi	April 10, 1941	December 27, 1941	
Chiang Kai-Shek	December 27, 1941	October 30, 1942	
T. V. Soong	October 30, 1942	July 30, 1945	

== Post-1947 Constitution ==
Political Party: Kuomintang Democratic Progressive Party Independent/ unknown

No.	Portrait	Name	Term of office		Days	Political party	Cabinet
1		Wang Shijie	July 30, 1945	December 27, 1948	1246	Kuomintang	Weng Wenhao; Sun Fo
2		Wu Tiecheng	December 27, 1948	March 21, 1949	84	Kuomintang	Sun Fo; He Yingqin
3		Fu Bingchang	Did not take office			Kuomintang	He Yingqin
4		Hu Shih	Did not take office			Independent	Yan Xishan
5		George Yeh	October 1, 1949	July 14, 1958	3208	Kuomintang	Yan Xishan; Chen Cheng I Yu Hung-Chun; Chen Cheng II
6		Huang Shao-ku	July 14, 1958	May 31, 1960	687	Kuomintang	Chen Cheng II
7		Shen Chang-huan	May 31, 1960	May 27, 1966	2187	Kuomintang	Chen Cheng II; Yen Chia-kan
8		Wei Tao-ming	May 27, 1966	March 31, 1971	1769	Kuomintang	Yen Chia-kan
9		Chow Shu-kai	March 31, 1971	May 29, 1972	425	Kuomintang	Yen Chia-kan
10		Shen Chang-huan	May 29, 1972	December 16, 1978	2392	Kuomintang	Chiang Ching-kuo; Sun Yun-suan
11		Chiang Yen-si	December 20, 1978	December 19, 1979	364	Kuomintang	Sun Yun-suan
12		Chu Fu-sung	December 19, 1979	April 22, 1987	2681	Kuomintang	Sun Yun-suan; Yu Kuo-hua
13		Ting Mao-shih	April 22, 1987	July 20, 1988	455	Kuomintang	Yu Kuo-hua
14		Lien Chan	July 20, 1988	June 1, 1990	681	Kuomintang	Yu Kuo-hua; Lee Huan
15		Fredrick Chien (Chien Foo)	June 1, 1990	June 10, 1996	2201	Kuomintang	Hau Pei-tsun; Lien Chan
16		John Chang (Chiang Hsiao-yen)	June 10, 1996	October 20, 1997	497	Kuomintang	Lien Chan; Vincent Siew
17		Jason Hu (Hu Chih-chiang)	October 20, 1997	November 30, 1999	771	Kuomintang	Vincent Siew
18		Chen Chien-jen	November 30, 1999	May 20, 2000	172	Kuomintang	Vincent Siew
19		Tien Hung-mao	May 20, 2000	February 1, 2002	622	Independent	Tang Fei; Chang Chun-hsiung I
20		Eugene Chien (Chien You-hsin)	February 1, 2002	April 16, 2004	805	Kuomintang	Yu Shyi-kun
21		Mark Chen (Chen Tang-shan)	April 16, 2004	January 25, 2006	649	Democratic Progressive Party	Yu Shyi-kun; Frank Hsieh
22		James Huang (Huang Chih-Fang)	January 25, 2006	May 5, 2008	1196	Independent	Su Tseng-chang I Chang Chun-hsiung II
—		Yang Tzu-pao	May 6, 2008	May 19, 2008	13	Independent	Chang Chun-hsiung II
23		Francisco Ou (Ou-Hung-lian)	May 20, 2008	September 10, 2009	478	Kuomintang	Liu Chao-shiuan
24		Timothy Yang (Yang Chin-tien)	September 10, 2009	September 26, 2012	1112	Kuomintang	Wu Den-yih; Sean Chen
25		David Lin (Lin Yung-Lo)	September 27, 2012	May 20, 2016	1331	Independent	Sean Chen; Jiang Yi-huah; Mao Chi-kuo; Chang San-cheng
26		David Lee (Lee Ta-wei)	May 20, 2016	February 26, 2018	647	Kuomintang	Lin Chuan; William Lai
27		Joseph Wu (Wu Chao-hsieh)	February 26, 2018	May 20, 2024	2275	Democratic Progressive Party	William Lai; Su Tseng-chang II; Chen Chien-jen
28		Lin Chia-lung	May 20, 2024	Incumbent	863	Democratic Progressive Party	Cho Jung-tai

== See also ==
- Foreign relations of the Republic of China
