= Wei Tao-ming =

Chinese diplomat (1899–1978)

- 魏道明
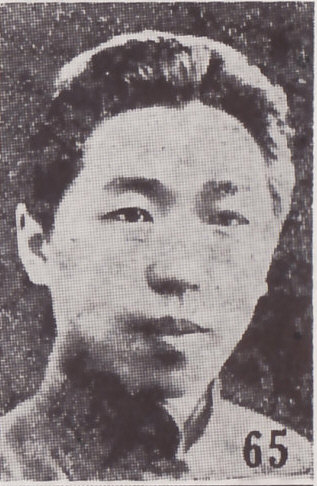
- Wei Tao-ming as pictured in The Most Recent Biographies of Chinese Dignitaries

Minister of Foreign Affairs
- In office 1966–1971

1st Chairman of Taiwan Provincial Government
- In office 16 May 1947 – 5 January 1949
- Preceded by: Chen Yi (as Chief Executive of Taiwan Province
- Succeeded by: Chen Cheng

ROC Ambassador to United States
- In office 1942–1946
- Preceded by: Hu Shih
- Succeeded by: Wellington Koo

Personal details
- Born: 28 October 1899 Dehua, Jiujiang, Jiangxi, Qing dynasty
- Died: May 18, 1978 (aged 78) Taipei, Taiwan
- Education: University of Paris (LLD)

Wei Tao-ming (Chinese: 魏道明; pinyin: Wèi Dàomíng; Wade–Giles: Wei⁴ Tao⁴-ming², October 28, 1899 – May 18, 1978) was a Chinese lawyer, diplomat and politician of the Republic of China. He served as minister of justice and as mayor of Nanjing in the early years of the Nationalist government, and as ambassador to the United States from 1942 to 1946, during the Second World War. In 1947, after the February 28 incident, he succeeded Chen Yi as the first civilian governor of Taiwan Province, a post he held until the end of 1948. He later served as ambassador to Japan and, from 1966 to 1971, as foreign minister, as the Republic of China fought to keep its seat in the United Nations.

== Early life and education ==
Wei Tao-ming was born on October 28, 1899, in Jiujiang, Jiangxi province. His courtesy name was Bocong. He was educated in France, and he received a doctorate in law from the University of Paris in 1925 with a thesis on the cheque in China.

== Early career ==
After returning to China, Wei and Zheng Yuxiu, who had also studied in France, opened a joint law firm in the Shanghai French Concession in 1926. In 1927, he was named secretary-general of the Ministry of Justice of the Nationalist government in Nanjing, and the partnership was dissolved. He served as minister of justice from 1928 to 1929, and as mayor of Nanjing from 1930 to 1931. During the early years of the Second Sino-Japanese War, he was secretary-general of the Executive Yuan. Wei was a member of the Political Study Clique of the Kuomintang, and he had close ties to the families of H. H. Kung and T. V. Soong.

== Ambassador to the United States ==
In April 1941, Wei was appointed ambassador to France. He traveled to the United States on his way to the post, but the Vichy government declined to receive a new Chinese ambassador, and he remained in Washington, D.C. There he served on the staff of the Chinese embassy under Ambassador Hu Shih.

In August 1942, the Chinese government recalled Hu and named Wei as his successor, and the acting secretary of state agreed to the appointment on August 31. Wei was appointed ambassador to the United States in September 1942. Liu Chieh, the counselor of the Chinese embassy, told the State Department that Wei did not have "any intimate knowledge of the United States" and was more proficient in French than in English. On January 11, 1943, Wei and Secretary of State Cordell Hull signed in Washington the treaty by which the United States gave up its extraterritorial rights in China. In August 1944, he informed the State Department of the composition of the Chinese delegation to the Dumbarton Oaks Conference, in which he served alongside the delegation's chairman, Wellington Koo.

Wei was among the Nationalist government insiders implicated in the American Dollar Bond scandal of 1942 and 1943. After Japan declared war on the United States and the United Kingdom in 1941, the two allies sought to support China despite the logistical limits imposed by the loss of British Burma, and they lent large sums to the Nationalist government. The government decided to use US$200 million of these funds to absorb excess fabi and curb inflation. In theory, Chinese buyers would purchase the bonds with fabi at the official exchange rate and would be paid in dollars when the bonds were redeemed after victory over Japan. The American Dollar Bonds were issued on March 24, 1942, but public demand was poor and few were sold. In October 1943, Kung sent Chiang Kai-shek a secret memorandum asking that the sales end, and after subscriptions closed on October 15, a central bank official falsely announced that all the bonds had been sold. Insiders then secretly bought the remaining bonds with currency acquired on the black market, which produced a windfall for Wei, Kung, Long Yun, members of the Soong family and others.

Wei's term as ambassador lasted until 1946. In 1946, he was named vice president of the Legislative Yuan in Nanjing.

== Governor of Taiwan ==
After the February 28 incident of 1947, the Executive Yuan decided on April 22 to abolish the Taiwan Provincial Administrative Executive Office headed by Chen Yi, and to appoint Wei as chairman of a new Taiwan Provincial Government. The American ambassador to China, John Leighton Stuart, reported that the appointment was "probably designed for its effect on the American public", and he described the civilian character of the new government as "a step forward". Before leaving for Taiwan, Wei said that the main objectives of his administration would be democracy, economic stability and a higher standard of living, and that it would strictly follow the central government's instructions. Stuart wrote that Wei "gave every appearance of being well-intentioned", and that he had obtained Chiang's consent to reduce the number of troops on the island.

Wei left Nanjing for Taipei on May 13, 1947. He arrived in Taiwan on May 15, and the provincial government was established the next day. On May 16, he lifted martial law and ended the qingxiang campaign of arrests that had followed the uprising, and he also ended press and postal censorship. Wei held that cases arising from the incident should be handled by the courts, and about 4,000 people detained after the uprising were released. Seven Taiwanese were appointed commissioners, making up half of his cabinet, although the former American vice consul George H. Kerr noted that in each case the vice commissioner was a mainlander who held effective control. Wei also pursued economic liberalization, reorganizing the Monopoly Bureau, dismantling the Trade Bureau and opening some state enterprises to private operation.

Kerr wrote that the civilian Wei had "very little influence" with either the Nationalist army or the party, and that under the conditions then prevailing on the mainland he "faced a hopeless task". The Taiwanese independence activist Peng Ming-min wrote that Wei was "considered little more than a figurehead", valued mainly for his wide acquaintance in Washington. Writing in 2007, the scholar Chu Jingtao described Wei's policies as a milder approach that eased tensions between Taiwanese and mainlanders, but noted that they did not reopen the investigation of the incident, and that heavy currency issuance under his administration fed inflation.

On December 29, 1948, Wei was abruptly dismissed, and Chiang appointed General Chen Cheng in his place. Chen preferred that Wei keep the post, but after several telegrams from Chiang, he took up the position on January 5, 1949. Wei and his wife then left for Hong Kong on their way to California.

== Later career ==
In mid-1964, as tensions between the Republic of China and Japan eased, Wei was appointed ambassador to Japan, despite opposition from some members of the Legislative Yuan. In June 1966, he became foreign minister.

As foreign minister, Wei worked with the United States to defend the Republic of China's seat in the United Nations. At a meeting with Secretary of State William P. Rogers in New York on October 16, 1970, he thanked the United States for its support, warned that Canada's recognition of the People's Republic of China and changes of government in Chile and Bolivia would hurt the effort, and asked for American help in persuading several countries, including Cambodia, to vote against the Albanian resolution to seat Beijing. In November 1970, Rogers told President Richard Nixon that he planned to meet Wei in early December to urge him to impress upon Chiang "the seriousness of the situation" facing his government in the UN and in its bilateral relations.

In 1971, Wei left the foreign ministry, where he was succeeded by Chow Shu-kai, and became a senior adviser to the president. Later that year, the General Assembly adopted Resolution 2758, which gave China's seat to the People's Republic of China. Wei died of illness in Taipei on May 18, 1978, at the age of 78. On June 6, a public memorial service was held for him in the Jingxing Hall of the Taipei First Funeral Parlour, after which his remains were taken to the United States and buried beside his wife.

== Personal life ==
Wei married Cheng Yü-hsiu in Shanghai in August 1927. Cheng had joined Sun Yat-sen's revolutionaries as a young woman, and after her education in France she became China's first woman lawyer and judge. She lived with Wei at the ambassador's residence in Washington from 1942 to 1946, and her autobiography, My Revolutionary Years, was published in 1943 while she was living there. In Taiwan, Kerr wrote, she "dominated the Governor's office" and was sometimes called its "Super Governor", and Peng wrote that she was generally believed to run the government and the economy. Cheng died of cancer in Los Angeles on 16 December 1959.

Diplomatic posts
Preceded by Hu Shih	China's Ambassador to the United States; 1942–1946	Succeeded by Wellington Koo
Government offices
Preceded by none	Governor of Taiwan; 1947–1949	Succeeded by Chen Cheng
Political offices
Preceded by Shen Chang-huan	ROC Foreign Minister; 1966–1971	Succeeded by Zhou Shukai
