= Zhang Qun =

Chinese politician (1889–1990)

- 張羣
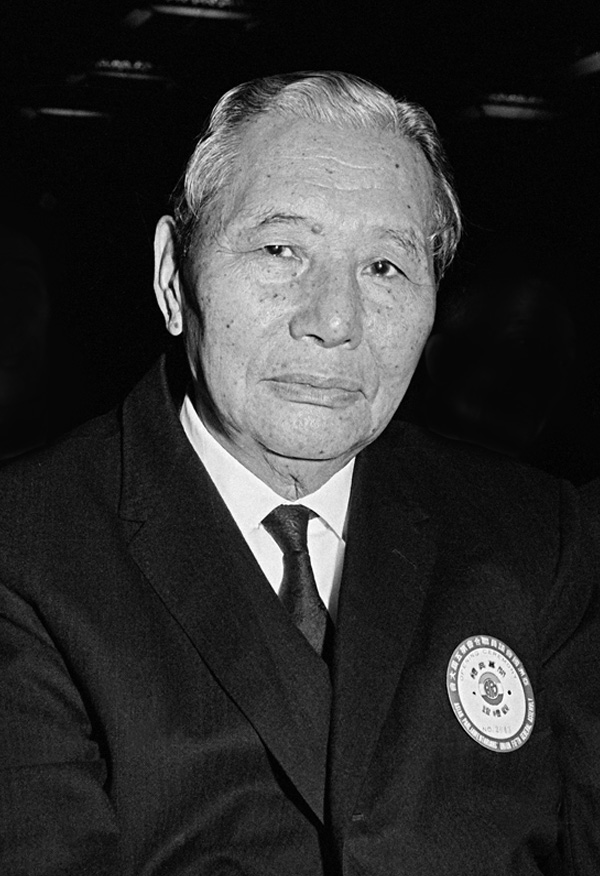

Premier of China
- In office 23 April 1947 – 24 May 1948
- President: Chiang Kai-shek
- Vice Premier: Wang Yunwu; Ku Meng-yu
- Preceded by: Chiang Kai-shek (acting)
- Succeeded by: Weng Wenhao

Vice Premier of China
- In office 1 January 1938 – 11 December 1939
- Premier: H. H. Kung
- Preceded by: H. H. Kung
- Succeeded by: H. H. Kung

Minister of Foreign Affairs
- In office 12 December 1935 – 4 March 1937
- Premier: Chiang Kai-shek
- Preceded by: Wang Jingwei
- Succeeded by: Wang Chonghui

Secretary-General to the President
- In office 18 May 1954 – 28 May 1972
- President: Chiang Kai-shek
- Deputies: Xu Jingzhi; Huang Bo-du; Zheng Yanfen

Governor of Sichuan
- In office 15 November 1940 – 14 May 1947

Governor of Hubei
- In office 7 July 1933 – 17 December 1935

Mayor of Shanghai
- In office 1 April 1929 – 6 January 1932

Personal details
- Born: 9 May 1889 Huayang County, Sichuan, Qing Empire
- Died: 14 December 1990 (aged 101) Taipei, Taiwan
- Party: Kuomintang
- Education: Baoding Military Academy; Tokyo Shimbu Gakko; Imperial Japanese Army Academy
- Awards: Order of National Glory; Order of Blue Sky and White Sun; Order of Chiang Chung-Cheng; Order of Brilliant Star; Order of the Three Stars

Zhang Qun
- Traditional Chinese: 張羣
- Simplified Chinese: 张群
Transcriptions
Standard Mandarin
- Hanyu Pinyin: Zhāng Qún
- Wade–Giles: Chang Ch'ün

Zhang Qun (Note: Chinese: 張羣; pinyin: Zhāng Qún; Wade–Giles: Chang Ch'ün; also known as Zhang Yuejun (張岳軍)) (May 9, 1889 – December 14, 1990) was a Chinese politician and premier of China and a prominent member of the Kuomintang. He served as secretary general to the President of the Republic from 1954 to 1972 and senior advisor to Presidents Chiang Kai-shek, Yen Chia-kan, Chiang Ching-kuo, and Lee Teng-hui. Under the influence of his wife, Ma Yu-ying, he became a Christian in the 1930s.

== Education and early career ==
Born in the Huayang County (now part of Shuangliu County), Sichuan province, Chang was admitted in 1906 to the Baoding Military Academy, just southwest of Beijing. The next year, he was selected to go to Japan to study at the Tokyo Shimbu Gakko, a preparatory military school, where he specialized in artillery. Together with his classmate, Chiang Kai-shek, he joined the Tongmenghui the same year. After completing their preparatory studies, they both served in the Takada regiment of the Imperial Japanese Army’s 13th Field Artillery Brigade, stationed in Niigata Prefecture before returning to China to serve under Sun Yat-sen in the Xinhai Revolution which would overthrow the Qing monarchy in 1911. During this period, a lifelong friendship between the two men and Huang Fu was formed and the three became sworn, or blood, brothers. Chang married Ma Yu-ying (馬育英) in 1913; because their first child was born in 1917, he later joked to have practiced family planning long before it became popular.

When Yuan Shikai attempted to restore the monarchy, Chang fled to Japan, finished his military training at the Imperial Japanese Army Academy in 1915, and then went to the Netherlands East Indies, where he taught in an overseas Chinese school. Returning to China to participate in Yuan's overthrow in the National Protection War, he served as adjutant-general to Cen Chunxuan, president of the southern provinces, which repudiated Yuan's regime. With the restoration of the Republic, Chang held several posts. Becoming a major general of the National Revolutionary Army at age 28, he later became a member of the Kuomintang's Central Executive Committee, mayor of Shanghai and president of Tongji University, governor of Hubei province and foreign minister. In the KMT, he led the Political Science Clique (政學系), which included military men such as Huang Fu and Xiong Shihui (熊式輝), intellectuals, such as Yang Yongtai and Wang Chonghui, and bankers and industrialists, including Wu Dingchang (吳鼎昌) and Chang Kia-ngau. During World War II, he served as secretary general of the National Security Council and governor of Sichuan province.

== Post-war career ==
In 1946, Chang, representing the national government, was a member of the Committee of Three (also known as the Marshall Mission) along with General George C. Marshall, then head of the U.S. Joint Chiefs of Staff, and Chinese Communist Party representative Zhou Enlai, which had been established in Nanjing in January 1946 to effect a Kuomintang-Communist truce and head off civil war. The Marshall Mission helped to bring about a temporary ceasefire, but its plans for a political-military settlement did not succeed.

Special Envoy Chang on his way to visit Emperor Hirohito in Tokyo, 1957

In 1947, Chang headed the first coalition government as president of the Executive Yuan, a position also known as premier of the Republic of China. His platform was to prepare China for constitutional government, land reform, and price control. Despite his long ties with Chiang Kai-shek, he could not bring about the political reforms that he favored. After the transfer of the capital from Nanjing to Taipei, he became chief of staff and secretary general to the president in 1954. Among his duties were planning the government's foreign policy and representing the president in Japan, Africa and Europe, including the Second Vatican Council in 1965.

Pope Paul VI receives Special Envoy Chang in 1965

In 1972, he played a large role in the difficult negotiations regarding Japan's switch of diplomatic recognition to the People's Republic of China. His last official position was chairman of the Presidium of the Kuomintang's Central Advisory Committee.

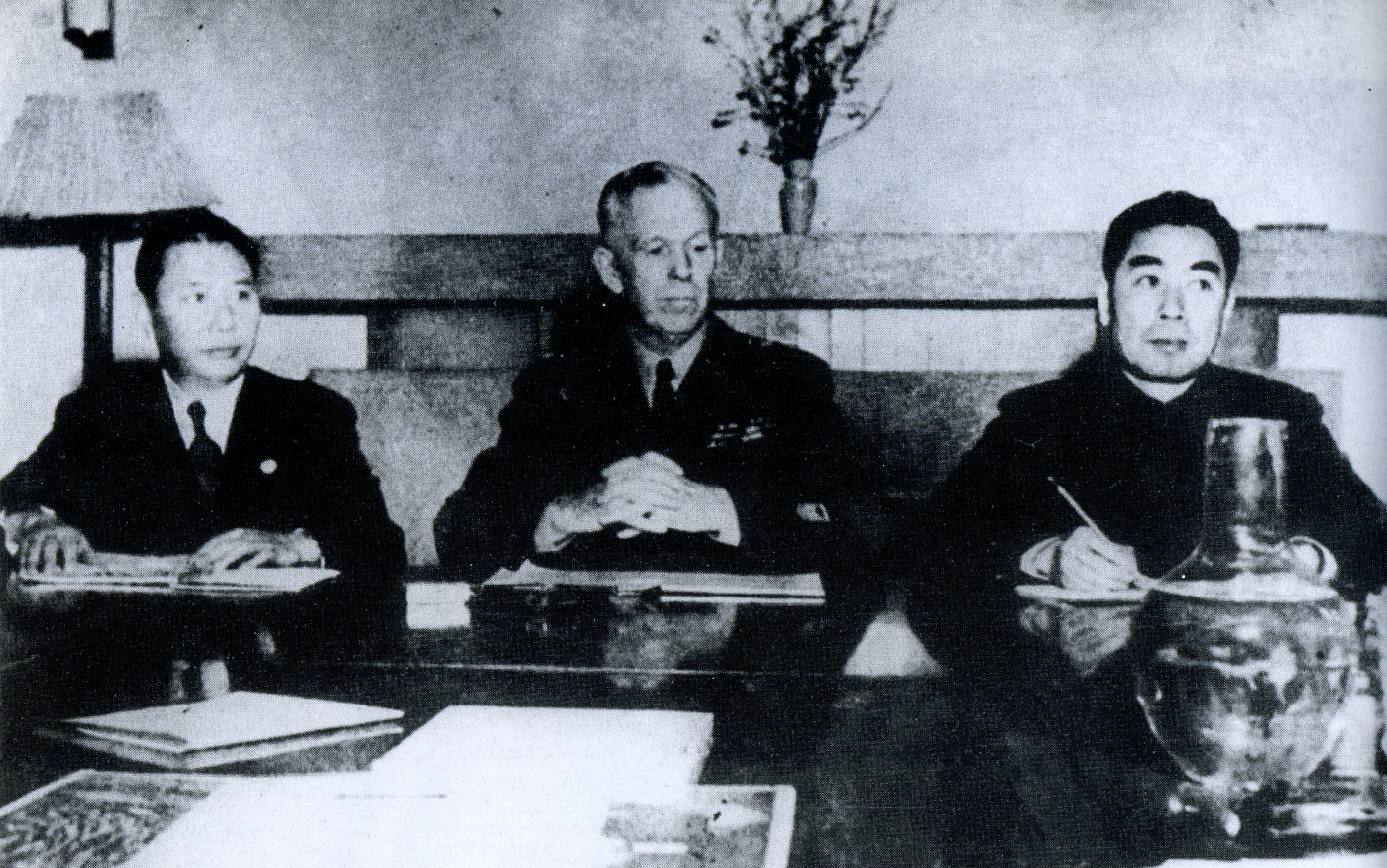
Committee of Three, from left, Nationalist representative Chang, General George Marshall and Communist representative Zhou Enlai.

== Personal life ==
A member of the board of the National Palace Museum, Chang was a renowned calligrapher, keen art collector, friend of great artists such as Chang Dai-chien, Huang Jun-bi and Ran In-ting, and recipient of honorary doctorates from several universities, including the University of Illinois, Seoul National University, St. John's University (New York), Sungkyunkwan University and Soochow University (Taiwan). He died at the age of 101 years, 219 days, of heart and kidney failure, at Veterans General Hospital in Taipei, on December 14, 1990. From 20 January 1990, when former Japanese Prime Minister Prince Naruhiko Higashikuni died until his own death, Chang was the world's oldest living former head of government.

Chang's wife, Ma Yu-ying (馬育英; pinyin: Ma Yuying), was a devout Christian and died in 1974. His daughter, Yalan Chang Lew (劉張亞蘭; pinyin: Liu Zhang Yalan), died on July 14, 2014, at age 97 in Seattle, US; she was the widow of Ambassador Yu-tang Daniel Lew (劉毓棠; pinyin: Liu Yutang), who had died in 2005 at age 92 in Taipei. His son, Dr. Philip Chi-cheng Chang (張繼正; pinyin: Zhang Jizheng), who died on October 24, 2015, at age 96 in Taipei, was former communications minister 1969–72, chairman of the Council for Economic Planning and Development 1973–76, finance minister 1978–81 and governor of the Central Bank of China 1984–89. His second son, Rev. Dr. Theodore Chi-chong Chang, who died on October 26, 2020, at age 92 in California, was vice president of the Truth Theological Seminary and pastor emeritus of the Mandarin Baptist Church of Pasadena, California.

From left: Mrs. Chi-cheng Chang, Ambassador Yu-tang Lew, Mrs. Sylvia Philips, Dr. Chang, Royal Philips Electronics Chairman Frits Philips and Mrs. Yalan Lew in 1976

== Awards ==
- (Taiwan) Order of National Glory
- (Taiwan) Order of Blue Sky and White Sun
- (Taiwan) Order of Chiang Chung-Cheng
- (Taiwan) Order of the Brilliant Star, Special Class with Grand Cordon
- (Latvia) Order of the Three Stars, 1st Class (January 19, 1937)
- (South Korea) Order of Merit for National Foundation, Independence Medal (1968)

== Notes ==
Political offices
Preceded by Huang Fu	Mayor of Shanghai; 1929–1932	Succeeded by Wu Tiecheng
Preceded by Wang Jingwei	Minister of Foreign Affairs; 1935–1937	Succeeded by Wang Ch'ung-hui
Preceded by H. H. Kung	Vice Premier of China; 1938–1939	Succeeded by H. H. Kung
Preceded by Chiang Kai-shek	Premier of China; 1947–1948	Succeeded by Wong Wen-hao
Preceded by Xu Jingzhi	Secretary-General of the Presidential Office of the Republic of China; 1954–1972	Succeeded by Zheng Yanfen
