= Mingde High School =

- 明德中学

Location
- Tianxin District, Changsha, Hunan, China; 410004
- Coordinates: 28°07′19″N 112°57′54″E

Information
- Type: Comprehensive Public High School
- Motto: 坚苦真诚 (Hardship and sincerity)
- Established: 1903
- Founders: Hu Yuantan (胡元倓)
- Principal: Xu Lin (徐林)
- Grades: 10 to 12
- Gender: Coed
- Campus size: 100,000 square metres (1,100,000 sq ft)
- Campus type: Urban
- Affiliation: Changsha Municipal Bureau of Education
- Website: www.mdzx.net

Mingde High School (simplified Chinese: 明德中学; traditional Chinese: 明德中學; pinyin: Míngdé Zhōngxué) is a public coeducational high school in Tianxin District of Changsha, Hunan, China.

== Etymology ==
The name was formulated based on a sentence from Great Learning, one of the "Four Books" in Confucianism.

== History ==
Mingde High School traces its history back to the former "Mingde School" (明德学堂), founded by educator Hu Yuantan (胡元倓) in 1903, during late Qing dynasty.

In 1932, Chiang Kai-shek inspected the school and took pictures with teachers and students, inscribing four Chinese characters "止于至善".

In February 1938, due to the Second Sino-Japanese War, the school moved to Zeng's Ancestral Temple in Mount Xia (霞岭) at the junction of Hengshan, Xiangxiang and Xiangtan.

In 1941, the school was renamed "Hunan Provincial Mingde Middle School" (湖南省立明德中学).

In November 1944, when the Japanese invaded Hunan, Hu Shaokui (胡少煃), then dean of education at Mingde Middle School, led the teachers and students to move to Lantian County.

On March 16, 1946, the school moved back to Taianli Campus (泰安里校区) in Changsha and was officially reopened.

After the establishment of the Communist State in 1949, the school was renamed Changsha No. 3 Middle School (长沙市第三中学), New Changsha No. 3 Middle School (新长沙市第三中学) and Power Machine No. 57 Middle School (动力机五七中学).

In 1983, the school was renamed "Changsha Mingde High School".

In August 2015, Principal Fan Qiuming (范秋明) was placed under investigation for corruption, bribery and unfair relationships with several women by the Central Commission for Discipline Inspection (CCDI), the Communist Party's internal disciplinary body.

== Athletics ==
- Basketball (men's and women's)

== List of principals ==
Period	English title	Chinese title	Term	Notes
Mingde School (Mingde Xuetang)	Hu Yuantan	胡元倓	1903–1941	
Mingde School (Mingde Xuexiao)	Xie Zhen	谢真	1919–1947	Acting
Mingde School (Mingde Xuexiao)	He Jingwei	何经渭	1938–1942	Acting
Mingde School (Mingde Xuexiao)	Zhou Anhan	周安汉	1937	Acting
Mingde School (Mingde Xuexiao)	Hu Shaokui	胡少奎	1944–1949	Acting
Hunan Provincial Mingde Middle School	Cao Zanhua	曹赞华	1950–1951	Acting
Hunan Provincial Mingde Middle School	Hu Mai	胡迈	1941–1960	
Changsha No. 3 Middle School	Zhou Yuesen	周岳森	1952–1953	Acting
Changsha No. 3 Middle School	Luo Sande	罗三德	1954–1958	Acting
Changsha No. 3 Middle School	Yang Da	杨达	1959–1960	Acting
Changsha No. 3 Middle School	He Fujie	何辅喈	1960–1961	
Changsha No. 3 Middle School	Zhu Yaoyi	朱耀一	1961–1969	
New Changsha No. 3 Middle School	Li Donghai	李东海	1968–1969	
Power Machine No. 57 Middle School	Huang Ying	黄英	1969–1971	
Changsha No. 3 Middle School	Zhang Zhaoli	张朝立	1972–1979	
	Liu Yutian	刘雨田	1979–1983	
Changsha Mingde High School	Liu Ruiqing	刘瑞清	1983–1985	
Changsha Mingde High School	Zhang Tiejun	章铁军	1986–2000	
Changsha Mingde High School	Lai Xuexian	赖学显	2000–2006	
Changsha Mingde High School	Fan Qiuming	范秋明	2000–2015	
Changsha Mingde High School	Xu Lin	(徐林)	2015–present	

== Notable alumni ==
- Politicians: Ren Bishi, Huang Xing, Chen Tianhua, Chen Guofu, Shen Liren
- Academicians of the Chinese Academy of Sciences (CAS): Ai Guoxiang, Xiao Jimei, Li Xun, Liao Shantao, Xiang Da, Wu Yaozu, Ding Xiaqi, Tang Zhisong, Zhang Xiaoqian, Jin Yuelin, Chen Hansheng
- Academicians of the Chinese Academy of Engineering (CAE): Yu Daguang, Liu Jingnan
- Academicians of the Academia Sinica: Jeffrey P. Chang, Liu Yizheng, Tsiang Tingfu
