= Guo Taiqi =

Republic of China diplomat (1888–1952)

- 郭泰祺
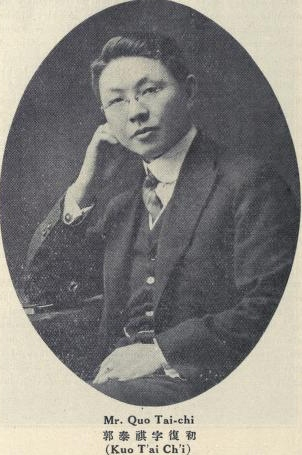

Permanent Representative of China to the United Nations
- In office 21 July 1946 – 13 November 1947
- Preceded by: Office established
- Succeeded by: Tsiang Tingfu

Minister of Foreign Affairs
- In office 10 April 1941 – 27 December 1941
- Preceded by: Wang Chonghui
- Succeeded by: Chiang Kai-shek (acting); T. V. Soong

Personal details
- Born: 4 December 1888 Hubei, Qing dynasty, China
- Died: 29 February 1952 (aged 63) Santa Barbara, California, USA
- Party: Kuomintang
- Education: University of Pennsylvania (BA)
- Awards: Order of the Three Stars, 1st Class (1937)

Guo Taiqi (Chinese: 郭泰祺; pinyin: Guō Tàiqí; Wade–Giles: Kuo T'ai-ch'i, also Quo Tai-chi; 1888–1952) was a diplomat during the Republic of China and an active member of the Kuomintang from the early years of the Republic of China until shortly after the Chinese Communist Revolution on mainland China.

Guo was born in Hubei province in 1888 and graduated from the University of Pennsylvania in 1911, Phi Beta Kappa.

He was one of the technical delegates of China to the Paris Peace Conference, 1918–1919. At a time when the victors of the Great War were negotiating the spoils of war and punishment of the conquered, Guo controversially stated it would be better for the Germans to retain their concessions in Shandong than to allow the aggressive, militarist Japanese to take possession of them. The Chinese delegation's wishes were largely ignored by the European powers, and Guo's words proved prophetic as over the next three decades, Japan's appetite for conquest proved genocidal.

Guo published a book in English, entitled China's Fight for Democracy, in 1920, at a time when the Kuomintang was actively struggling against several regional warlords to reunify China as a democratic republic.

Guo Taiqi held a variety of posts, including commissioner of foreign affairs of the "Canton government" in 1927 and Vice-Minister of Foreign Affairs of the Republic of China in the late 1920s and early 1930s. In 1929, he resigned the post of vice-minister of foreign affairs in protest of the placement of so many former imperial and warlord bureaucrats in the Kuomintang's Nanjing government, but was convinced to return. During one of his tenures as Vice-Minister, he was beaten by an angry, nationalist mob in Shanghai in May 1932 for his decision to sign an armistice with the Japanese, who were continuously pushing further into Chinese territory. He signed the armistice from the hospital, but resigned his post that year.

From 1932 to 1940, Guo served as the first Chinese representative to Britain elevated from minister/legate to ambassador. He worked tirelessly to make China's case against Japan's continued, aggressive expansion in northern China at a time when the British were far more concerned with fascist acts of war on the Continent. He also lobbied for an end to British arms sales to the Japanese, whose airplanes, armed with British guns, were killing countless civilians in China even before war was declared. While ambassador to Court of St. James, Guo also signed treaties of amity between the Republic of China and the republics of Latvia and Estonia. On 19 January 1937 he was awarded the Latvian Order of the Three Stars 1st Class.

In April 1941, Guo was named to replace Wang Chonghui as foreign minister by the Central Executive Committee of the Kuomintang. During his time as foreign minister, he negotiated an end to the special, extraterritorial rights exercised by the United States and United Kingdom in China since the mid-19th century. It was also he who, on December 8, 1941, confirmed that the Republic of China was officially at war with not only the Empire of Japan, but also Nazi Germany and the Kingdom of Italy.

Guo represented China at the newly formed United Nations in San Francisco in 1946. He also presided over the first session of the U.N. Security Council held in March 1946 in New York. In November 1947, Y.P. Tsiang was named permanent Chief Chinese Delegate to the United Nations, replacing Guo. In December 1947, Guo was appointed Chinese ambassador to Brazil, replacing Cheng Tien-ku. He could remain the seat of China in the UN despite the communists' dominance in Mainland China and the establishment of the People's Republic of China.

Guo died on February 29, 1952, in Santa Barbara, California. He was 63.

Government offices
Preceded by Wang Chonghui	Foreign Minister of the Republic of China; 1941–1942	Succeeded by T. V. Soong
Diplomatic posts
Preceded by post established	Permanent Representative and Ambassador of China to the United Nations; 1946–1947	Succeeded by Tsiang Tingfu
