= Konsin Shah =

ROC Pilot and Diplomat (1919-2008)

Konsin Shah (Chinese: 夏功權; pinyin: Xia Gongquan; 17 September 1919 – 18 October 2008) was a Chinese-born Republic of China (Taiwan) Air Force officer and diplomat. He served as the Ambassador to New Zealand from 1968 to 1973 and first Representative to the United States from 1979 to 1981, during which he consistently wore a black necktie as a silent protest against the U.S. decision to establish diplomatic relations with the People's Republic of China. He was noted for his symbolic protest in 2001, when he injured his wrist with a knife during a Kuomintang meeting to demand the expulsion of former president Lee Teng-hui, and he later advocated for closer cooperation between the Kuomintang and other pan-Blue parties ahead of the 2004 presidential election.

Shah is the son-in-law of Huang Shao-ku, a senior Kuomintang politician who served as Vice Premier and President of the Judicial Yuan.
