= Wu Mei-yun =

Taiwanese editor and publisher

- 吳美雲
- Born: 1944; New York City, United States
- Died: May 12, 2016 (aged 71–72); Taipei, Taiwan
- Occupations: Editor, Publisher
- Known for: Founder of Echo Publishing Co., Ltd.
- Relatives: Wu Tiecheng (grandfather)

Wu Mei-yun (Chinese: 吳美雲; 1944 – 12 May 2016) was a Taiwanese editor and publisher. She was best known for founding Echo Publishing Co., Ltd. and launching Echo Magazine. She played a pivotal role in promoting Taiwanese children's literature and traditional Chinese culture through publishing, educational projects, and cultural exchange initiatives.

== Early life ==
Wu was born in New York City. She was the granddaughter of Wu Tiecheng and the daughter of Wu You-lin, an official in the Central Trust Bureau. Wu graduated from Taipei American School before pursuing studies in the United States and the United Kingdom. She enrolled at Western College for Women in Oxford, Ohio (now part of Miami University), where she developed an interest in editing and publishing. In her junior year, she served as editor-in-chief of the college newspaper. Wu later received a Fulbright scholarship to pursue graduate studies in political science and strategic studies in the United Kingdom.

== Career ==
In 1970, Wu Mei-yun, already a mother, quit her job and converted her home bathroom into a darkroom to establish Echo Publishing. She collaborated with Huang Yong-song and Yao Meng-chia and to launch Echo Magazine, becoming known collectively as the "Four Pillars of Echo" once Hsi Sung joined in 1978. The magazine drew inspiration from American publications such as Life, Outlook, and Playboy to develop its unique editorial style.

Wu initially worked fourteen-hour days, seven days a week, and faced financial difficulties, nearly preventing the magazine's timely launch. Echo Magazine debuted on 1 January 1971, with an initial order of 10,000 copies supplied by China Airlines for in-flight readership. The magazine's emphasis on field research in Taiwan, high-quality photography, and literary reportage contributed to its international circulation, reaching subscribers in thirty-three countries. To supplement income, Wu and her partners undertook projects such as producing a Taiwan lifestyle handbook for the National Science Council and creating films on traditional Chinese festivals for the Tourism Bureau.

Throughout the 1970s and 1980s, Wu oversaw numerous publishing projects, including 漢聲中國童話, 漢聲小百科, 愛的小小百科, and curated collections of international children's picture books and young adult literature. Her publications aimed to provide Taiwanese children with culturally relevant materials in addition to Western stories. She personally supervised editorial and production processes, often engaging directly in cultural content creation.

== Later years and death ==
Following the deaths and retirements of key partners, Wu continued as operator of Echo Publishing amid financial decline. She suffered from various health issues. The 2008 global financial crisis further impacted the company during her illness. Wu Mei-yun died on 12 May 2016 at age seventy-two in Taipei Cathay General Hospital.
