= Echo Publishing Co., Ltd. =

Taiwanese publishing company

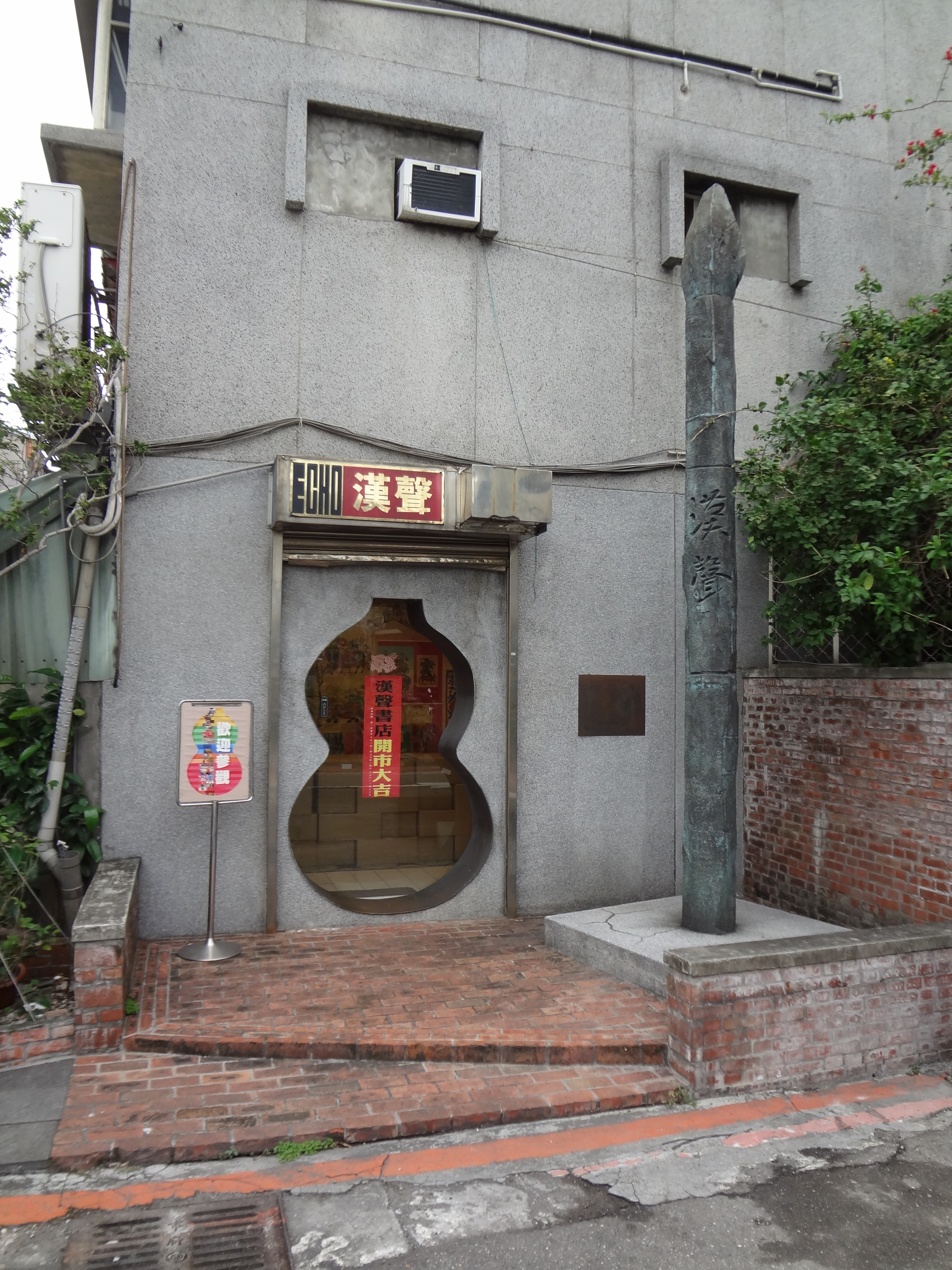
- Type: Chinese: 股份有限公司
- Industry: Publishing
- Founded: January 1, 1971
- Founder: Wu Mei-yun; Huang Yong-song; Yao Meng-chia; Hsi Sung
- Products: Books, magazines
- Website: hanshenggifts.com

Echo Publishing Co., Ltd. (Chinese: 漢聲雜誌社), commonly rendered in English as Echo of Things Chinese or simply Echo Publishing, is a Taiwan-based publishing company and magazine publisher founded in 1971 and headquartered in Songshan District, Taipei. The company is best known for its cultural magazines and a series of children's publications that document and disseminate traditional Chinese culture and folk arts.

The Department of Cultural Affairs, Taipei City Government highlights Echo Publishing for its influential educational series Han Sheng Junior Encyclopedia (漢聲小百科) and Han Sheng Little Encyclopedia (漢聲小小百科), which together sold over 250,000 sets. The encyclopedias covered a wide range of topics—from history and geography to speculative visions of the world fifty years into the future—and are credited with inspiring generations of Taiwanese children. Although Echo Publishing no longer produces new titles, its Taipei bookstore continues to display its past works.

== History ==
Echo Publishing Co., Ltd. was founded between 1970 and 1971 by Wu Mei-yun, Huang Yong-song, Yao Meng-chia and Hsi Sung, who are collectively known as the Four Junzi of Echo Publishing.

The English edition of ECHO of Things Chinese was first published the following January, with the aim of promoting traditional Chinese culture and folk arts to an international audience. Its content focuses on three main themes—folk customs, arts, and culture—supplemented by illustrated materials that document and highlight distinctive aspects of popular culture.

Echo Publishing acquired the rights to publish a series of translated picture books in Chinese, released as the collection Han Sheng’s Selection of the World’s Best Children’s Picture Books. The 105-volume set was distributed through a direct sales system. The series was organized according to Western classifications of picture books into two major categories—fiction and nonfiction—further divided into “psychological development” and “science education.” Editor Cheng Ming-chin placed particular emphasis on nonfiction science picture books, allowing Taiwanese readers early exposure to high-quality educational picture books from abroad. The series retained the original publication format and included notable titles such as The Wolf and the Seven Young Kids and Where the Wild Things Are. Produced and edited by Echo Publishing and distributed by Tai-Ying Publishing, the set also came with a supplementary “Mother’s Handbook” designed to promote picture book reading and instructional use in early childhood education.

Starting in January 1984, Echo began targeting young children, publishing two volumes each month under the series "Echo's Selected World’s Best Picture Books for Children" — one focusing on psychological growth and the other on science education.

== Cultural influences ==
In December 2024, the Taoyuan Children's Art Museum hosted its annual year-end exhibition titled New Echo Little Encyclopedia (新說小百科). The exhibition invited eight artists to reinterpret the textual and conceptual framework of Echo Little Encyclopedia (《漢聲小百科》) through artistic practice, transforming the museum space into an immersive, encyclopedic environment that could be explored, inhabited, and navigated.

According to the art website Art Emperor, since its first publication in 1984, Echo Little Encyclopedia has compiled extensive knowledge through field research and in-depth interviews with experts and scholars, reaching cumulative sales of approximately 260,000 copies. The series became highly popular in Taiwan during the 1980s and 1990s and is considered an essential part of childhood reading for many families, representing a shared cultural memory of a generation.

Upon the death of Wu Mei-yun, co-founder of Echo Publishing Co., Ltd., former Minister of the Interior Lee Hong-yuan wrote a tribute recalling the profound influence of Wu’s work:

“When I was in college, Echo Magazine was already widely known. They had published a series of books on Chinese culture which stood out in Taiwan’s relatively barren publishing landscape at the time. These works became bestsellers and were popular among university students,” “I would read one story to my children every day — the children loved listening, and I also benefited greatly. In fact, many of the historical anecdotes I know were revisited during that period abroad. Lee wrote.

In a 2017 thesis titled "The Debate on the Inheritance of Chinese Culture: A Case Study of Echo Magazine," the author noted that while Echo consistently emphasized “Chinese culture,” “Huaxia civilization,” and “the Chinese people,” reflecting strong cultural nationalism and confidence, it also engaged deeply with Taiwanese local traditions. Wu Mei-yun, Huang Yong-song, and Yao Meng-chia’s three-year participation in the Dajia Mazu Pilgrimage before publishing a feature established Echo’s signature fieldwork approach. Similarly, the 1983 issue “Discovering the Traditional Oil Press” exemplified its meticulous documentation of traditional crafts.

However, early Echo issues did not focus solely on an abstract “China.” Taiwan also featured prominently, though coverage often prioritized contemporary and social relevance over historical analysis. For example, the 1982 “Rice” trilogy addressed Taiwan’s rice overproduction by combining cultural, agricultural, and culinary perspectives to promote local consumption. Later issues, such as “Freedom from the Fear of Eating: Food Additives” and “Freedom from the Fear of Eating: Pesticides” (1986), highlighted growing concerns about food safety and modernization.

In contrast, Echo’s coverage of “China” carried a strong historical orientation, seen in specials like “Images of Chinese History—The Joys and Sorrows of the Chinese People” and “The Great Migration” (1996). This uneven treatment—historicizing China while contemporizing Taiwan—has led scholars to argue that Echo often subsumed Taiwan’s experiences into a broader China-centered narrative.

In Diverse New Perspectives: Taiwanese Emerging Writers of the Twenty-First Century (多元新視界，台灣青壯作家二十一世紀小說), the novel Have You Ever Read the Echo Little Encyclopedia? (《你讀過〈漢聲小百科〉嗎？》) explicitly examines how Echo Little Encyclopedia (《漢聲小百科》) functions as a medium of collective memory, linking personal emotional experiences with cultural identity. The novel's narrator, A-Tao, recounts encountering a miniature encyclopedia from an extraterrestrial visitor during childhood, which takes the protagonist on imaginative journeys across space and time, facilitating learning about astronomy, geography, and natural phenomena.

Through this depiction, the novel emphasizes the role of Echo Little Encyclopedia as a shared educational reference for Taiwan's millennial generation, while also highlighting the ideological underpinnings embedded in its content. According to the narrative, the encyclopedia reflects pro-China nationalist perspectives: it features a Taiji symbol, emphasizes historical and cultural continuity from early ancestors in Beijing to prehistoric sites, and presents a China-centered worldview that subtly fosters a sense of connection with Chinese civilization. Readers grew up engaging with knowledge framed by the geographic and historical scale of a unified China, even while residing in the "Province Taiwan of Republic of China".

The novel situates Echo Little Encyclopedia within the broader context of 1980s Taiwanese mass educational media, identifying it as part of the Dang Guo’s state-directed cultural and civic education apparatus.
