= Shen Chang-huan =

Chinese politician

- 沈昌煥
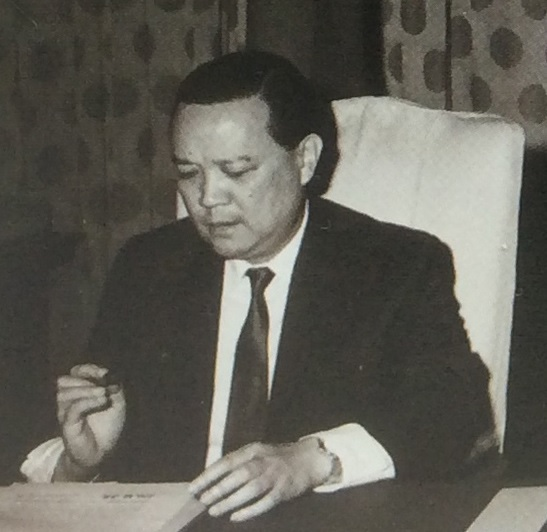

Minister of Foreign Affairs of the Republic of China
- In office 29 May 1972 – 16 December 1978
- Preceded by: Chou Shu-kai
- Succeeded by: Chiang Yen-si
- In office 31 May 1960 – 27 May 1966
- Preceded by: Huang Shao-ku
- Succeeded by: Wei Tao-ming

Ambassador of the Republic of China to Thailand
- In office 1 February 1969 – 1 June 1972
- Preceded by: Peng Meng-chi
- Succeeded by: Ma Chi-Chuang

Ambassador of the Republic of China to Vatican City
- In office September 1966 – March 1969
- Preceded by: Hsieh Shou-kang
- Succeeded by: Chen Chih-mai

Ambassador of the Republic of China to Spain
- In office 1959–1960

Vice Minister of Foreign Affairs of the Republic of China
- In office 1953–1959
- Minister: George Yeh; Huang Shao-ku

Personal details
- Born: 16 October 1913 Suzhou, Jiangsu, Republic of China
- Died: 2 July 1998 (aged 84) Taipei, Taiwan
- Party: Kuomintang
- Relatives: Lai Man-Wai (father-in-law)
- Education: Yenching University (BA); University of Michigan (MA)

Shen Chang-huan (Chinese: 沈昌煥; pinyin: Shěn Chānghuàn; 16 October 1913 – 2 July 1998) was a Taiwanese politician and diplomat. He is the longest-serving Minister of Foreign Affairs in Taiwan's history, in office for a cumulative total of over twelve years from 1960 to 1966 and from 1972 to 1978.

== Life and career ==
Shen was born in Suzhou, Jiangsu, in mainland China. He was educated at Yenching University in Beijing, before moving to the United States and completing a Master of Arts degree at the University of Michigan. He was a member of the Kuomintang (Chinese Nationalist Party), and from 1945 to 1948 served as Chiang Kai-shek's private secretary. He was a government spokesman from 1950 to 1953, after the retreat to Taiwan. During a lengthy career in foreign affairs, he served as Vice Minister of Foreign Affairs (1953–1959), Ambassador to Spain (1959–1960), Minister of Foreign Affairs (1960–1966), Ambassador to the Holy See (1966–1969), Ambassador to Thailand (1969–1972), and Minister of Foreign Affairs again (1972–1978). His second term as foreign minister was served under Chiang Ching-kuo, the son of Chiang Kai-shek.

His strong anticommunist convictions, his determination not to deviate from the one China position in the ROC's diplomatic relations, and the high value he placed on maintaining as close relations as possible with the United States coincided closely with the views of his leader [Chiang Ching-kuo].

— Ralph N. Clough, Chiang Ching-kuo's Leadership in the Development of the Republic of China on Taiwan (1993)

== Personal life ==
Shen's wife was the oldest daughter of Japanese-born Hong Kong filmmaker Lai Man-wai. This relationship indirectedly caused the suicide of Lai Man-wai's actor son Lai Hang in mainland China.
