= Hollington Tong =

Chinese journalist and diplomat

- 董顯光
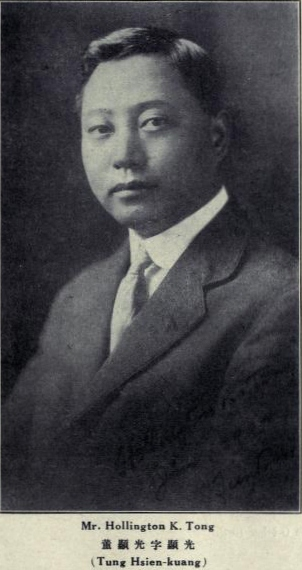

Chinese Ambassador to the United States
- In office 1956–1958
- President: Chiang Kai-shek
- Preceded by: V. K. Wellington Koo
- Succeeded by: George Yeh

Chinese Ambassador to Japan
- In office 1952–1956
- President: Chiang Kai-shek

Personal details
- Born: November 9, 1887 Ningbo, Zhejiang Province, Qing Empire
- Died: January 9, 1971 (aged 83) Monterey, California, U.S.
- Party: Kuomintang
- Spouse: Sally Chao
- Children: 6
- Relatives: Kaity Tong (great-niece)
- Education: Park College; University of Missouri (BA); Columbia University (MS)
- Profession: Journalist, diplomat

Hollington Kong Tong (Chinese: 董顯光; Wade–Giles: Tung^{3} Hsien^{3}-kuang^{1}); 9 November 1887 – 9 January 1971) was a Chinese journalist and diplomat.

Tong was from a poor Chinese Christian family. He graduated with a B.A. in journalism from the University of Missouri, and then from the first class of the Columbia University Graduate School of Journalism in 1913. Upon returning to China, he worked as a journalist and later became the chief editor of a large English-language newspaper in Shanghai. He also was the official biographer of Chiang Kai-shek.

Tong was appointed Vice-Minister of Information of the Republic of China (Taiwan), Ambassador of the Republic of China to Japan, and Ambassador of the Republic of China to the United States (1956-1958). In the latter role, he was replaced by George Yeh.

Tong died on 9 January 1971, in a nursing home in Monterey, California, at the age of 83.
