= Honour Sabre of the Awakened Lion =

Honour in the military of the Republic of China

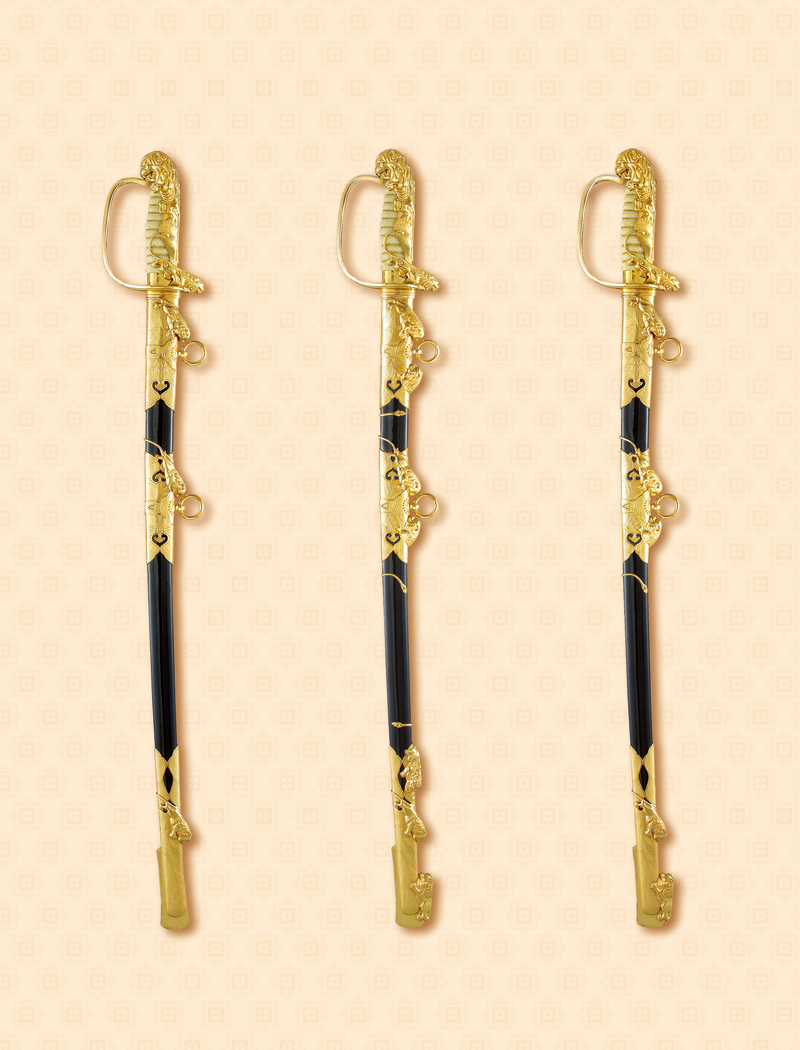
- Type: Military honour
- Country: Republic of China
- Presented by: President of the Republic of China (Taiwan)
- Eligibility: Military
- Status: Active
- Established: 1935

Highlights
- Total recipients: 0

Precedence
- Next (higher): None (highest)
- Next (lower): Order of National Glory

Honour Sabre of the Awakened Lion
- Traditional Chinese: 醒獅勳刀
- Simplified Chinese: 醒狮勋刀
Transcriptions
Standard Mandarin
- Hanyu Pinyin: Xǐng Shī Xūn Dāo
- Wade–Giles: Hsing3 Shih1 Hsün1 Tao1

Honour Sabre of the Awakened Lion (Chinese: 醒獅勳刀) is an honour sabre of the Republic of China. It was created in 1935 to award already highly decorated officers who are deserving of more commendation. The Honour Sabre is the highest honour the military of the Republic of China can bestow.

It is awarded in three grades, indicated by the number of lions on the hilt and scabbard: 5 indicates 3rd class, 7 indicates 2nd class, and 9 indicates 1st class.

As it was never awarded since its creation, the Executive Yuan passed a resolution on October 19, 2017, adding on to the draft amendment of the Armed Forces Decorations Act that would delete article 9 of the relevant act; however, as of 2022, article 9, which establishes the honour sword, remained substantive.

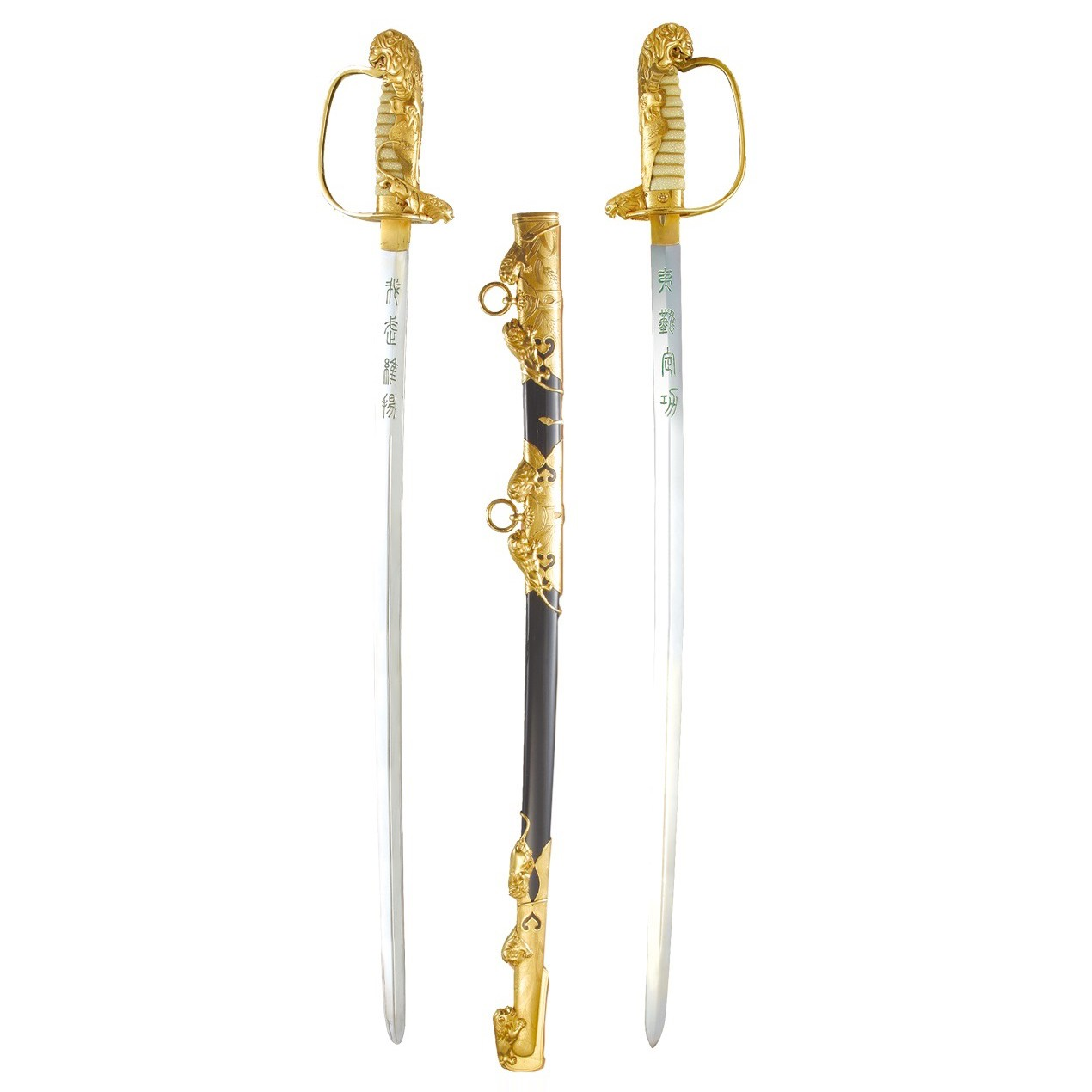
A view of both sides of the blade of the Honour Sabre. With the text "Defeat the foreign invaders" and "Our military might is known around the world".
