= Order of National Glory =

Highest military award of the Republic of China

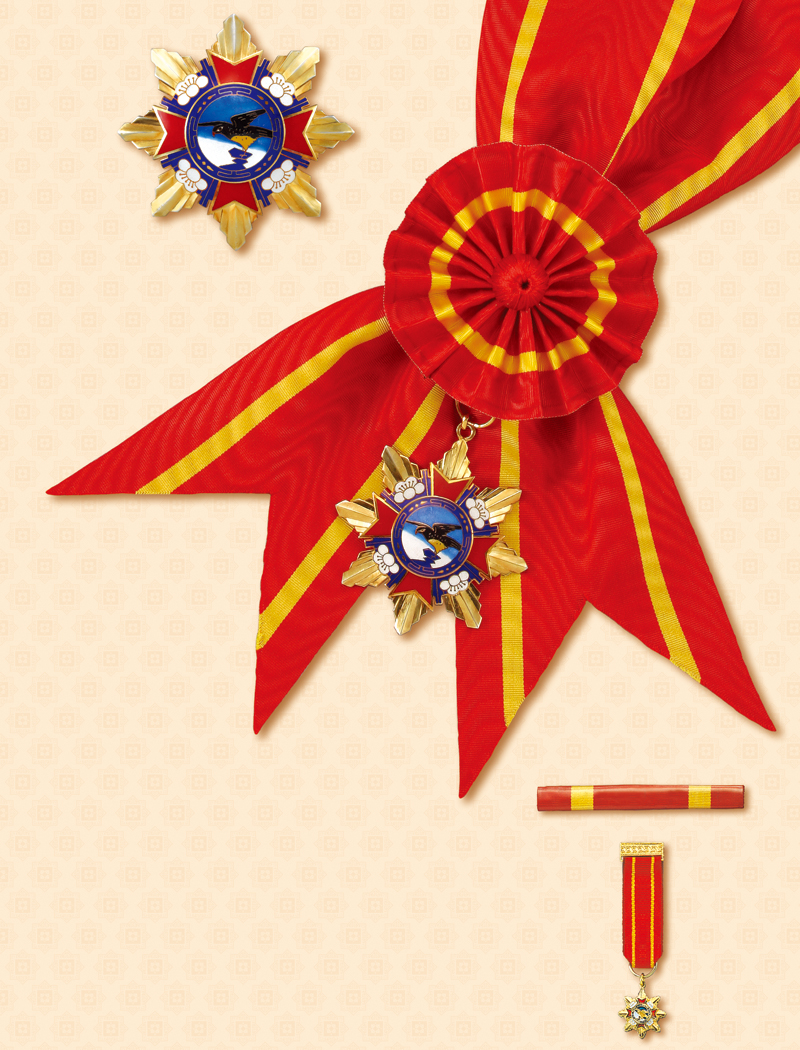
- Type: Military Order
- Country: Republic of China (Taiwan)
- Presented by: President of the Republic of China
- Eligibility: Military
- Status: Active
- Established: 8 November 1937
- First award: 1943
- Final award: 1965
- Ribbon bar of the Order

Precedence
- Next (higher): Honour Sabre of the Awakened Lion
- Next (lower): Order of Blue Sky and White Sun

Order of National Glory
- Traditional Chinese: 國光勳章
- Simplified Chinese: 国光勋章
Transcriptions
Standard Mandarin
- Hanyu Pinyin: Guó Guāng Xūn Zhāng
- Wade–Giles: Kuo2 Kuang1 Hsün1 Chang1

The Order of National Glory (Chinese: 國光勳章; pinyin: Guóguāng Xūnzhāng) is the highest military award of the Republic of China Armed Forces, the army of the Republic of China (Taiwan).

== Overview ==
The order was instituted on November 8, 1937, during the early stages of the Second Sino-Japanese War to recognize exceptional merit in safeguarding the nation. Only a few individuals have received this honor, including Chiang Kai-shek, He Yingqin, and Fu Zuoyi.

== Insignia ==
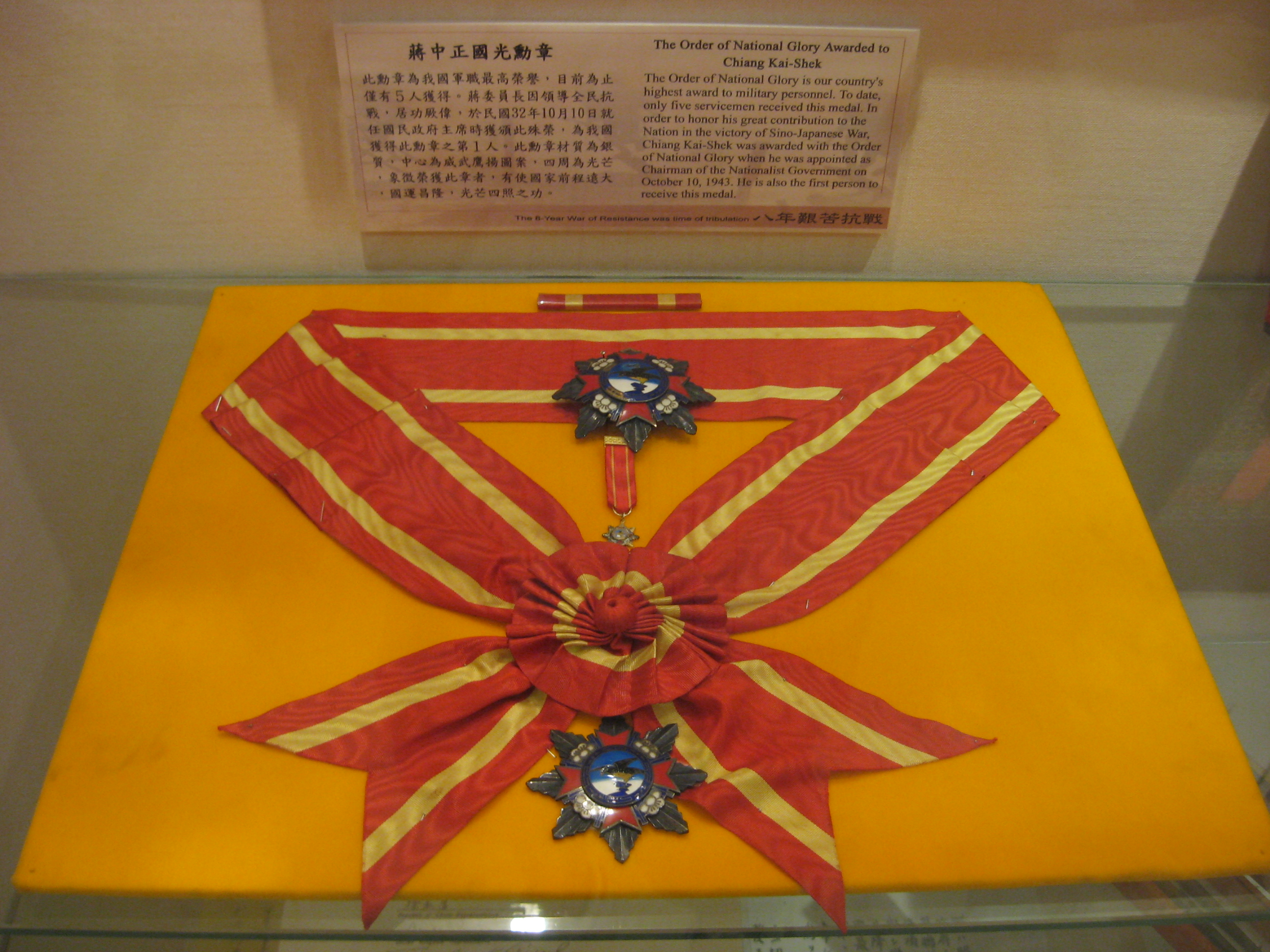
Order of National Glory awarded to Chiang Kai-Shek

The insignia is a golden eight-pointed star, with a red Maltese cross and plum blossom between the arms of the cross; inside the cross is a depiction of an eagle with its wings outstretched, often accompanied by a red, white, and blue sash worn over the right shoulder.

== Recipients ==
Image	Name of the recipient	Date of award	Ref
	Chiang Kai-shek	October 10, 1943	
	Fu Zuoyi	August 14, 1945	
	Zhou Zhirou	August 14, 1945	
	He Yingqin	August 14, 1945	
Defense Minister Yu Ta-wei 國防部長俞大維 (U.S. Navy 7th Fleet Commander Vice Admiral Thomas H. Moorer calls on ROC Defense Minister Yu Ta-wei 美國海軍第七艦隊司令穆勒中將拜會國防部長俞大維)	Yu Dawei	January 1, 1965	

== See also ==
- List of orders, decorations and medals of the Republic of China
