= List of ambassadors of the Republic of China to the Holy See =

Taiwanese Ambassador to the Holy See
- 中華民國駐教廷大使
- National Emblem of the Republic of China
- Incumbent; Matthew S.M. Lee since 2015
- Inaugural holder: Hsieh Shou-Kang
- Formation: 1946; 80 years ago
- Website: Embassy

The Taiwanese Ambassador to the Holy See is the official representative of the Republic of China to the Holy See.

== List of heads of the diplomatic mission ==
=== List of envoys to the Holy See ===
Name	Start date	End date	Notes
Hsieh Shou-Kang	January 1943	September 1946	
WU Ching-hsiung	September 1946	July 1949	
Chu Ying	July 1949	October 1954	as an agency
Hsieh Shou-Kang	October 1954	June 1959	then became an ambassador

=== List of ambassadors to the Holy See ===
Name	Start date	End date	Notes
Hsieh Shou-Kang	June 1959	September 1966	
Shen Chang-huan	September 1966	March 1969	
Chen Chih-Mai	March 1969	January 1978	
Chow Shu-Kai	January 1978	August 1991	
Hoang Sieou-Je	August 1991	May 1993	
Edward Tzu-Yu Wu	May 1993	August 1996	
Raymond R.M. Tai	September 1996	January 2004	
Chou-seng Tou	January 2004	15 September 2008	
Larry Wang	September 2008	December 2015	
Matthew S.M. Lee	December 2015	current	

== See also ==
- Embassy of the Republic of China to the Holy See
- Holy See–Taiwan relations
- Apostolic Nunciature to China
