= Liu Chieh =

Diplomat of the Republic of China

- 劉鍇
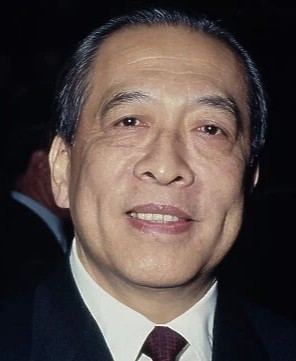
- Liu Kai in 1968

Ambassador of the Republic of China to the Philippines
- In office March 10, 1972 – July 25, 1975
- President: Chiang Kai-shek; Yen Chia-kan
- Preceded by: Sun Pi-chi
- Succeeded by: Ke Hua (representing People's Republic of China)

Permanent Representative of the Republic of China to the United Nations
- In office 1962 – October 25, 1971
- President: Chiang Kai-shek
- Preceded by: Tsiang Tingfu
- Succeeded by: Huang Hua (representing People's Republic of China)

Ambassador of the Republic of China to Canada
- In office 1947–1962
- President: Chiang Kai-shek, Li Zongren (acting)
- Preceded by: Liu Shih-sun
- Succeeded by: Hsueh Yu-chi

Personal details
- Born: Liu Yikai; May 27, 1907 Tientsin Fu, Chihli Province, Qing China
- Died: February 12, 1991 (aged 83) Fairfax Hospital, Fairfax County, Virginia, U.S.
- Party: Kuomintang
- Spouse: Zhang Taizhen (?-January 1991)
- Children: 2 (son and stepdaughter)
- Education: St. Stephen's College, Hong Kong; University of Oxford (MA); Middle Temple (Barrister); Columbia University (graduate studies, incomplete)
- Awards: Order of Victory of Resistance against Aggression

Liu Chieh (Chinese: 劉鍇; pinyin: Liú Kǎi; May 27, 1907 – February 12, 1991), also known by his courtesy name Yikai (Chinese: 奕鍇; pinyin: Yìkǎi), was a Republic of China diplomat. He served as the Permanent Representative of the Republic of China to the United Nations from 1962 to 1971. After the United Nations General Assembly Resolution 2758 was passed in 1971, he was the last representative of the Republic of China to the United Nations.

== Life ==
=== Early life ===
Liu was born in Tianjin in 1907 during the Qing dynasty. His ancestors originated from Nanxiong, Guangdong but later settled in the Zhongshan County, Guangdong. His father, Liu Cheng-chang, was a prominent railway expert and philanthropist, educated at Queen's College, Hong Kong. Liu Cheng-chang served as the director of operations for the South China section of the Canton-Kowloon Railway and the Peking-Shanghai-Hangchow Railway and later became the chairman of Kiang Wu Hospital in Portuguese Macau. He was awarded a medal of charity by the government of Portuguese Macau.

In 1913, Liu Cheng-chang hired a former Qing dynasty juren and a scholar trained in the Four Books and Five Classics to teach Liu traditional Chinese studies. Additionally, an English-educated teacher from St. John's University was hired to teach Liu English and mathematics, providing him with a strong academic foundation. At the age of 14, Liu enrolled at St. Stephen's College in British Hong Kong. After graduating four years later, he went to the United Kingdom and studied law at the University of Oxford, earning a Master of Arts degree. Liu then pursued legal training at the Middle Temple and became a qualified barrister. During his time in the UK, Liu became acquainted with notable figures such as Foo Ping-sheung, Hu Hanmin (a leader of the right-wing faction of the Kuomintang), and Sun Ke, the son of Sun Yat-sen, laying the groundwork for his future career in politics and diplomacy. After completing his education, Liu returned to China to work in the legal field.

=== Diplomatic career ===
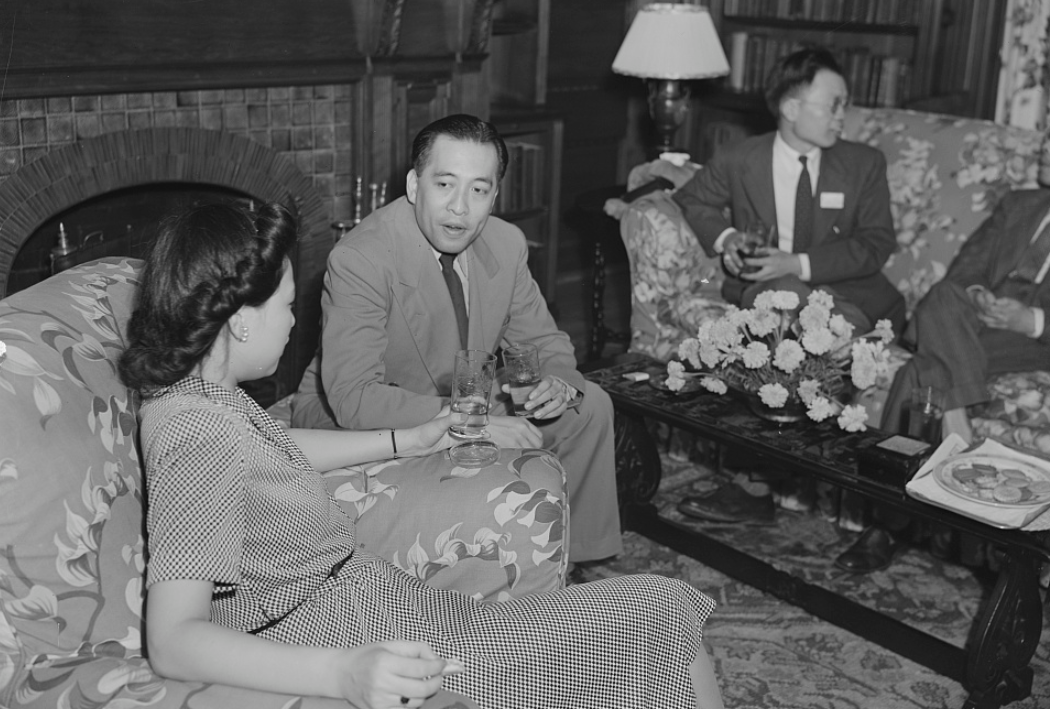
1942: Liu (center) serving as Counselor at the Embassy of the Republic of China in the United States

In 1930, during the period when the Northern Expedition successfully unified China under the Nationalist government, Hu Hanmin—then President of the Legislative Yuan—invited Liu to return to China and serve as a senior secretary at the Legislative Yuan. Liu was later appointed Secretary of the Legislative Yuan's Foreign Affairs Committee, assisting its chairman Foo Ping-sheung. In 1931, Liu officially joined the Ministry of Foreign Affairs and became a secretary. In 1932, he acted as an advisor to the Chinese delegation at the League of Nations and later worked as a second secretary in the League's Chinese delegation office.

In the following years, Liu served as a first secretary at the Chinese Embassy in the UK and was later promoted to Counselor. In 1941, he was transferred to the Chinese Embassy in the United States and became Minister Counselor. In 1942, Liu was appointed as the Minister of the embassy and worked under then-Ambassador Hu Shih in Washington, D.C. After the end of World War II in 1945, Liu served as Deputy Minister of Foreign Affairs and represented China in the Far East and Pacific subcommittees of the United Nations War Crimes Commission.

In 1944, Liu was part of the Chinese delegation at the Dumbarton Oaks Conference, which laid the foundation for the establishment of the United Nations. In 1945, he participated in the San Francisco Conference to finalize the United Nations Charter. In 1947, Liu became the Republic of China's representative to the United Nations Trusteeship Council and was appointed as the Ambassador to Canada, a position he held until 1962.

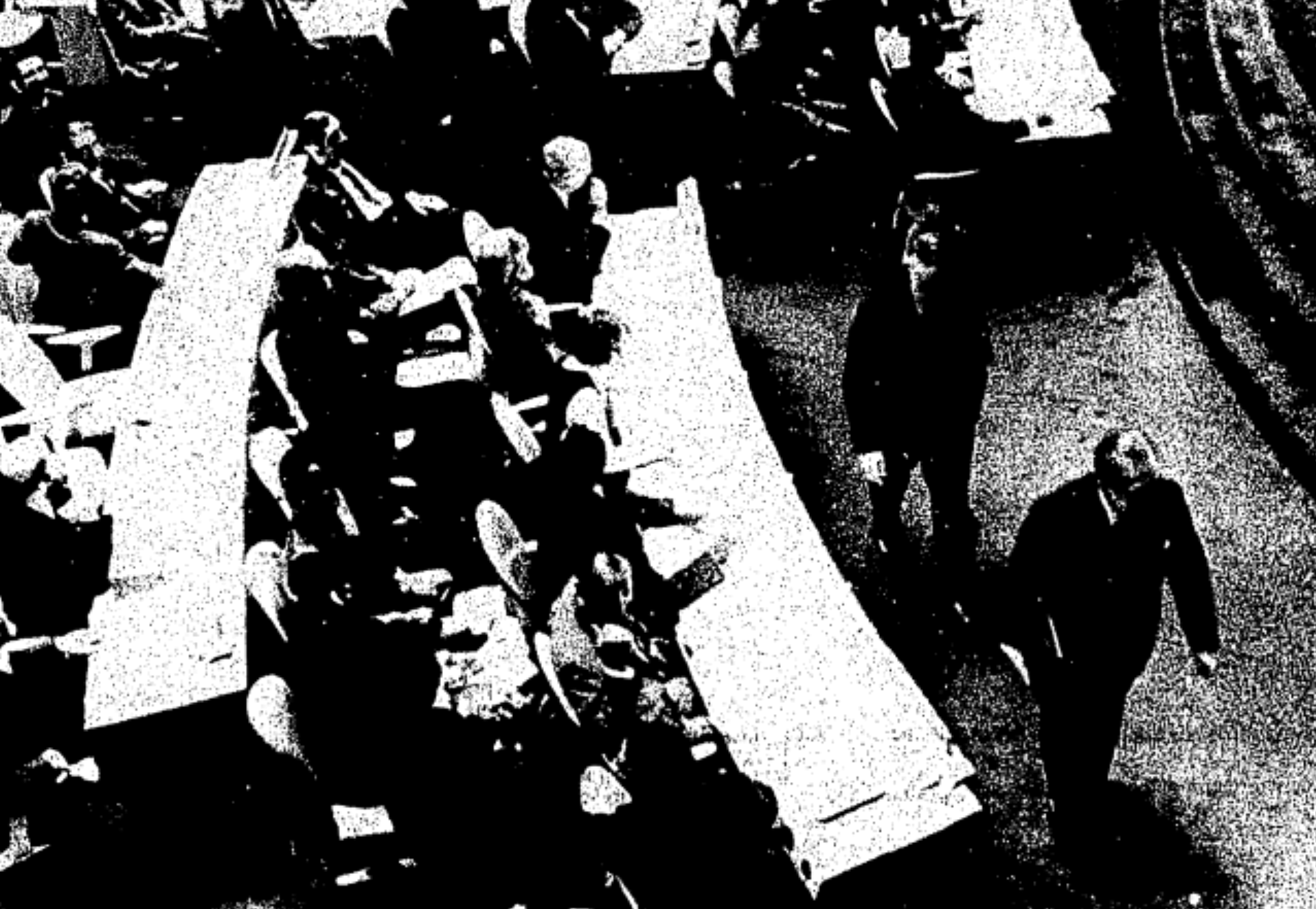
Liu (bottom right) leads the Republic of China delegation in walking out of the United Nations General Assembly during the vote on United Nations General Assembly Resolution 2758.

In 1962, Liu succeeded Tsiang Tingfu as the Permanent Representative of the Republic of China to the United Nations. During his tenure, he served as President of the United Nations Security Council multiple times. On October 25, 1971, shortly before the United Nations General Assembly voted to adopt United Nations General Assembly Resolution 2758, Liu and his delegation walked out of the assembly in protest against the resolution, which transferred the "China seat" from the Republic of China to the People's Republic of China. As Liu exited the chamber, George H. W. Bush, the United States Ambassador to the United Nations, reportedly followed closely behind him in solidarity. Following the vote, Huang Hua became the first Permanent Representative of the People's Republic of China.

In 1972, Liu was appointed as the Ambassador to the Philippines, presenting his credentials to the Philippine Congress on March 23, 1972. However, his term was marked by tensions between the Philippines, the Republic of China, and South Vietnam over sovereignty disputes in the Spratly Islands. Liu's tenure ended in 1975 when the Philippines formally recognized the People's Republic of China and severed diplomatic relations with the Republic of China.

After returning to Taiwan in 1975, Liu served as a Presidential Advisor and later as a consultant for the Ministry of Foreign Affairs. He was also elected as a member of the Central Review Committee of the Chinese Kuomintang during its 11th and 13th terms.

=== Later years ===
After retiring, Liu moved to the United States and settled in San Francisco. Liu suffered a cerebral hemorrhage and died on February 12, 1991, at Fairfax Hospital in Fairfax County, Virginia. He was 83 years old.

== Personal life ==
Liu was married; his wife was Zhang Taizhen. After marriage, they had a son and a stepdaughter. The legitimate son was named Alan, who worked in San Francisco in the United States during the 1990s. Liu was the eldest son in the family, with three younger brothers and one younger sister. The second brother, Liu He, was a businessman in Washington, the third brother, Liu Qian, was a practicing doctor in Kansas, the fourth sister is Liu Hengshi, and the fifth brother, Liu Yi, was an engineer in Canada.

In addition, Liu and Hu Shih ere friends. From Hu Shih's will, he called Liu a "friend" and also entrusted Liu as the executor of his will.

During his time at the United Nations, Liu met and became friends with George H.W. Bush, then the U.S. representative to the United Nations and later the 41st President of the United States. So much so that when Liu died in 1991, then-President George H.W. Bush, at a time when the 1991 Gulf War was at its peak, personally wrote a letter to Liu's son to express his condolences. According to diplomat Shen Lyu-shun, a Taiwanese diplomat, the content of the letter filled two pages of letter paper, and the handwritten letter expressed "great admiration" for Liu and recalled the process of their friendship.

Liu and Foo Ping-sheung were also friends. In fact, both Liu and Foo were graduates of St Stephen's College, Hong Kong. Both of them were once the Presidential Advisor of the Taiwanese government.

== Honours ==
- Order of Victory of Resistance against Aggression (1945)

Diplomatic posts
Preceded by Tsiang Tingfu	Permanent Representative and Ambassador of China to the United Nations; 1962–1971	Succeeded by Huang Hua; Representing the People's Republic of China
