= Huang Shao-ku =

Taiwanese politician (1901–1996)

- 黃少谷
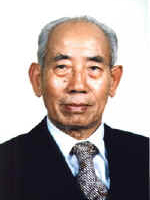

President of the Judicial Yuan
- In office 1 July 1979 – 1 May 1987
- Preceded by: Tai Yen-hui
- Succeeded by: Lin Yang-kang

Vice Premier of the Republic of China
- In office 1 June 1966 – 1 July 1969
- Premier: Yen Chia-kan
- Preceded by: Yu Ching-tang
- Succeeded by: Chiang Ching-kuo
- In office 1 June 1954 – 15 July 1958
- Premier: Chen Cheng; Yu Hung-Chun; Chen Cheng
- Preceded by: Chang Li-sheng
- Succeeded by: Wang Yunwu

1st Secretary-General of National Security Council of ROC
- In office 1 February 1967 – 20 June 1979
- President: Chiang Kai-shek; Yen Chia-kan; Chiang Ching-kuo
- Preceded by: Gu Zhutong (as counterpart in National Defense Council)
- Succeeded by: Shen Chang-huan

Minister of Foreign Affair of the Republic of China
- In office 14 July 1958 – 31 May 1960
- Preceded by: George Yeh
- Succeeded by: Shen Chang-huan

Personal details
- Born: 24 July 1901 Nan County, Hunan, Qing Dynasty
- Died: 16 October 1996 (aged 95) Taipei, Taiwan
- Party: Kuomintang
- Spouse: Hou Shu-fang
- Children: 3, including Huang Jen-chung
- Relatives: Huang Ti-fei (Brother); Hu Tung-Ching (Son-in-law via first daughter); Konsin Shah (Son-in-law via second daughter); Hsia Han-jen (Grandson via second daughter)
- Education: Beijing Normal University (BA)

Huang Shao-ku ([xwǎŋ ʂâʊ kù]; Chinese: 黃少谷; pinyin: Huáng Shǎogǔ; 24 July 1901 – 16 October 1996) was a Chinese journalist, diplomat and ranking politician in Kuomintang. Born in Hunan, he emerged as a student and journalistic activist in the 1920s, initially associated with left-leaning circles before affiliating with Feng Yuxiang and later realigning with Chiang Kai-shek's camp as a leading member of the Tsotanhui Clique. Huang held several senior posts in the Republic of China government in Taiwan, most notably serving as Vice Premier (1954–1958; 1966–1969), Minister of Foreign Affair (1958–1960), inaugural Secretary-General of National Security Council (1967-1979) and President of the Judicial Yuan (1979–1987).

== Biography ==
Huang was born in Hunan in 1901. He received his secondary education at Mingde High School, where he held leadership positions in the student self-governing association and served as an editor of the school paper. In 1919, during the Hunan Autonomy Movement initiated by Mao Zedong, Huang organized and led the students of Mingde High School to join a class boycott and protest in support of the campaign.

In 1921 Huang matriculated in the Department of Education at Beijing Normal University. After graduating he pursued a career in journalism and became associated with left-leaning publications; he served as editor-in-chief of the Guomin Wanbao (National Evening News), a role that, together with his close acquaintance with Li Dazhao, marked him as aligned with socialist intellectual currents of the period. During the political repression of 1927—when Chiang Kai-shek started purge Communists and regional warlords such as Zhang Zuolin conducted searches for leftists—Huang was targeted as a leftist and came under threat. On Li Dazhao’s recommendation he sought refuge in Xi’an and affiliated himself with Feng Yuxiang’s Guominjun. After securing his personal safety, Huang attended Li Dazhao’s funeral in 1933 and contributed an elegiac couplet in memory of the executed leader, writing: “How can one contemplate the martyr? The rivers and mountains have changed color; Through hardship I have become the one to outlive, leaving me ashamed before you."

In 1927, at the age of 26, Huang was appointed by Feng Yuxiang as Chief of Staff of the General Headquarters of the Second Group Army of the National Revolutionary Army and was commissioned with the rank of lieutenant general.

During the Central Plains War in 1930, Feng Yuxiang and Wang Jingwei convened an expanded meeting of the Kuomintang party headquarters at Huairentang in Beijing and issued a communiqué opposing Chiang Kai-shek's Nanjing government. Huang participated in this conference as a representative of Feng's faction.

In 1934, Huang Shao-ku and his wife Hou Shufang traveled to the United Kingdom to study at the London School of Economics, focusing on international economic relations. During the Xi'an Incident in 1936, Huang, together with other Chinese students studying in the UK, issued a statement calling for the immediate execution of Chiang Kai-shek.

Following the outbreak of the Second Sino-Japanese War in 1937, Huang was appointed by Chiang Kai-shek to several key positions: Minister of the Kuomintang Propaganda Department, President of the Sao Dang Newspaper, Commissioner of the Control Yuan, Director of the Supreme National Defense Council, and Chair of the Political Department Planning Committee of the Military Affairs Commission during the wartime.

After retreating to Taiwan with the Nationalist government in 1949, Huang held several ranking office for decades. In 1948, he had been elected to the first Legislative Yuan as a representative of the Press Association constituency, but soon resigned his legislative seat when he was appointed Secretary-General of the Executive Yuan in 1949. He was repeatedly named Minister without portfolio, serving in 1949–1950, 1951–1954, and 1958–1960, and was twice appointed Vice Premier, first from 1954 to 1958 and again from 1966 to 1969. From 1960 to 1962 he served abroad as the Republic of China’s Ambassador to Spain. He was Secretary-General of the National Security Council between 1967 and 1979, playing a prominent role in the government’s security policy during the Cold War period. He concluded his career as President of the Judicial Yuan from 1979 to 1987.

Within the Kuomintang (KMT), Huang was a member of the Tsotanhui Clique, a faction led by Chen Cheng. After Chen's death, Huang, together with Ni Wen-ya and Chao Tzu-chi, jointly led the Tsotanhui Clique. He also served as chairman of its affiliated organization, the New Politics Construction Foundation.

In 1988, following the death of KMT chairman Chiang Ching-kuo, Huang sought to run for the party chairmanship.

During the power struggle between Lee Teng-hui and Lin Yang-kang, Lee Huan, and Hau Pei-tsun, Huang sided with Lee Teng-hui. In 1990, Huang, along with Hsieh Tung-min, Ni Wen-ya, Li Kuo-ting, Chiang Yen-shih, Yuan Shou-chien, Koo Chen-fu, and Chen Li-fu, persuaded Lin Yang-kang and his running mate Chiang Wei-kuo to withdraw from the presidential race. The group of eight senior KMT figures became known collectively as the "Eight Elders" (Chinese: 八大老).

Huang died in 1996 at the age of 95.
