= Tsiang Tingfu =

Chinese historian and diplomat

Tsiang Tingfu 蔣廷黻
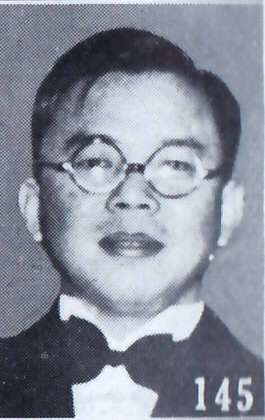
- Tsiang Tingfu as pictured in The Most Recent Biographies of Chinese Dignitaries

Ambassador of the Republic of China to the United States
- In office 18 November 1961 – 29 May 1965
- Preceded by: George Yeh
- Succeeded by: Chow Shu-kai

Permanent Representative of the Republic of China to the United Nations
- In office 13 November 1947 – 29 July 1962
- Preceded by: Guo Taiqi
- Succeeded by: Liu Chieh

Ambassador of the Republic of China to the Soviet Union
- In office 26 August 1936 – 1 January 1938
- Preceded by: Wu Nanru (Chargé d'affaires ad interim)
- Succeeded by: Yu Ming

Personal details
- Born: 7 December 1895 Shaoyang, Hunan, Qing Empire
- Died: 9 October 1965 (aged 69) New York City, New York, U.S.
- Education: Oberlin College (BA); Columbia University (PhD)
- Known for: Qing, Modern Chinese history

Tsiang Tingfu
- Chinese: 蔣廷黻
Transcriptions
Standard Mandarin
- Hanyu Pinyin: Jiǎng Tíngfú
- Wade–Giles: Chiang T'ingfu
- Tongyong Pinyin: Jiǎng Tíngfú
- Yale Romanization: Jyǎng Tíngfú
- IPA: [tɕjàŋ tʰǐŋfǔ]

Tsiang Tingfu (Chinese: 蔣廷黻; pinyin: Jiǎng Tíngfú; 17 February 1895 – 9 October 1965), was a historian and diplomat of the Republic of China who published in English under the name T.F. Tsiang. He headed the history departments of Nankai University and Tsinghua University before entering government in 1935, and he is regarded as a pioneer of the study of modern Chinese history. Tsiang served as ambassador to the Soviet Union from 1936 to 1938, held senior posts in the Executive Yuan during the Second Sino-Japanese War, and directed the Chinese National Relief and Rehabilitation Administration after the war. From 1947 to 1962, he was the Republic of China's permanent representative to the United Nations, and in 1961 he was also appointed ambassador to the United States. He died in New York in 1965.

== Early life and education ==
Tsiang was born on 7 December 1895 in Shaoyang County, Baoqing Prefecture, Hunan (present-day Shaodong county-level city in Shaoyang). He came from a family of middling farmers, his father and uncle were merchants with some landholdings, and he began a traditional private-school education at the age of six. His education from his teenage years was Western and largely Christian, and he converted to Christianity at the age of 11.

Encouraged by a teacher at a missionary school, he left for the United States in 1911 and arrived in San Francisco in February 1912. He studied at Park College in Parkville, Missouri, graduating in 1914, and entered Oberlin College in the autumn of that year, graduating in 1918. He then went to France, where he served as a YMCA secretary with the Chinese labourers attached to the French army during the First World War. He returned to the United States in 1919 and entered Columbia University as a graduate student in modern history. While at Columbia, he edited the English-language Chinese Students' Monthly, and during the Washington Naval Conference of 1921–1922 he was one of the representatives of the Chinese Students' Alliance who went to Washington to campaign against concessions to Japan. His doctoral dissertation, "Labor and Empire: A Study of the Reaction of British Labor, Mainly as Represented in Parliament, to British Imperialism Since 1880", led him to study the relationship between foreign relations and domestic politics, which shaped his later scholarship. After obtaining his PhD in February 1923, he returned to China.

== Academic career ==
In 1923, Tsiang became the first head of the history department at Nankai University, where, together with Liang Qichao, he laid the foundations of the university's historical studies. In 1929, he moved to Tsinghua University, where he served as head of the history department and dean of the College of Arts, and he reformed the department into one of the country's leading centres of historical research. He edited and published several works on Chinese history and edited the English-language journal Chinese Social and Political Science Review. Using newly opened Qing dynasty archives and diplomatic publications, he argued that China should adopt Western approaches if it wanted to achieve diplomatic success. He attributed China's unequal treatment by the Western powers after the First Opium War (1839–1842) partly to China's own unequal treatment of Western powers before the war. At Tsinghua, he trained a number of historians of the Qing period, including John K. Fairbank and Ho Ping-ti.

Tsiang argued that historical research should be scientific and objective, based on evidence rather than on conclusions decided in advance, and he drew a clear distinction between historical research and historical propaganda. He compared the writing of history to the construction of a building, in which primary sources were the raw materials, specialised studies the bricks and pillars, and a general history the finished structure.

== Government service ==
=== Entry into politics ===
After the Mukden Incident of 1931, Tsiang gave a lecture at Yenching University supporting the government's proposal to make the area around Jinzhou a neutral zone, which was opposed in a telegram issued by the university's staff and students. In the spring of 1932, he and Hu Shih founded the political journal Duli pinglun (Independent Critic), in which he became a leading voice. He argued that China would lose a war with Japan, that modern warfare required long preparation and full national mobilisation, and that China should seek peace with Japan for the time being. His writings attracted the attention of Chiang Kai-shek, who met him at Lushan in the summer of 1933 and again in early 1934, when Tsiang proposed solving the land problem of the peasants as part of the campaigns against the communists. In the autumn of 1933, Wang Jingwei, then president of the Executive Yuan and foreign minister, also consulted him on policy towards Japan, and Tsiang opposed deciding the question of war or peace by popular vote.

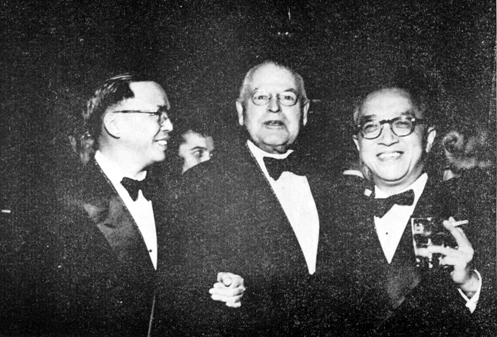
Hu Shih (right) and Tsiang (left)

In August 1934, Tsiang travelled to the Soviet Union and Europe to collect materials on Chinese diplomatic history, and Chiang Kai-shek asked him to use the trip to explore the possibility of Sino-Soviet cooperation as his personal representative. On 16 October 1934, Tsiang met the Soviet deputy commissar for foreign affairs, Boris Stomonyakov, who expressed the Soviet Union's wish to develop relations with China. In late 1935, Chiang, who had become president of the Executive Yuan, appointed Tsiang, who was not a member of the Kuomintang, as the Executive Yuan's director of political affairs. In the debate over war and peace with Japan, Tsiang called for an "honourable peace" and proposed a development programme of railway construction, industrialisation and agricultural improvement, which failed in the face of strong opposition from business circles.

=== Ambassador to the Soviet Union ===
In October 1936, Tsiang was appointed ambassador to the Soviet Union, with the government hoping that he could bring the Soviet Union to fight alongside China against Japan. Relations made little progress during his tenure, partly because of disputes over Xinjiang, Outer Mongolia and the sale of the Chinese Eastern Railway. Tsiang also believed that China was more likely to form an alliance with several countries, including the Soviet Union, than a bilateral alliance with the Soviet Union alone, a view that differed from the government's expectations. After the Xi'an Incident in December 1936, he protested to the Soviet foreign ministry, on the basis of a secret telegram from Vice President of the Executive Yuan H. H. Kung and without instructions from the Ministry of Foreign Affairs, that the incident had been instigated by the Soviet Union, which provoked a strong Soviet protest.

After the outbreak of the Second Sino-Japanese War, Tsiang maintained that the Soviet Union would not go to war with Japan unless Japan attacked it first, which conflicted with the government's efforts to bring the Soviet Union into the war, and he was recalled after little more than a year in the post. During his time in Moscow, he helped to arrange the return to China of Chiang Kai-shek's son Chiang Ching-kuo, who had lived in the Soviet Union for more than a decade. After resigning as ambassador in 1938, he wrote Zhongguo jindaishi (A History of Modern China) in Hankou.

=== Second Sino-Japanese War ===
After returning to China, Tsiang again served as the Executive Yuan's director of political affairs, and for a time also as acting secretary-general and spokesman of the Executive Yuan. On 9 August 1942, he issued a statement expressing the hope that the Allies would adopt a declaration similar to the Atlantic Charter guaranteeing Korea's independence after the war, which was the first official public statement of the Chinese government's position on the question. Later that month, in a lecture marking the centenary of the Treaty of Nanking, he argued that China could abolish the unequal treaties while promoting friendly relations with foreign powers.

=== Relief administration ===
Tsiang as council member of the United Nations Relief and Rehabilitation Administration for China (1944)

In early 1945, Tsiang became director-general of the Chinese National Relief and Rehabilitation Administration (CNRRA). In distributing relief supplies provided by the United Nations Relief and Rehabilitation Administration (UNRRA), he insisted, despite opposition from within the Kuomintang, that areas under Nationalist and Communist control be treated equally. On 14 November 1945, he signed the basic agreement between the Nationalist government and UNRRA. In 1946, he used relief supplies and equipment to set up a rural industrial demonstration office in Shaoyang, which established small factories producing machinery, castings, leather, pesticides, cement and fertiliser, and he founded an agricultural extension station in the same area. In October 1946, he became China's representative to the Economic Commission for Asia and the Far East.

== United Nations and later career ==
Tsiang meeting President John F. Kennedy at the White House (1962)

Between 1947 and 1962, Tsiang served as the Republic of China's permanent representative to the United Nations. After the establishment of the People's Republic of China on the mainland, he defended the exclusive right of the Republic of China, based in Taipei, to represent China in the United Nations and on the Security Council. In November 1950, a delegation of the People's Republic of China led by Wu Xiuquan attended the Security Council to present the PRC's complaint against American actions concerning Taiwan. On 29 November, when the council discussed the charge that China had committed aggression in Korea, Tsiang spoke in English against the PRC and in support of the United States. In reply, Wu asserted that Tsiang had no right to represent the Chinese people and remarked that he doubted whether the speaker was Chinese, since he did not speak the language of the Chinese people.

In 1955, he cast the Republic of China's veto against the admission of the Mongolian People's Republic to the United Nations, and Mongolia did not become a member at that time. It was the only time that the Republic of China used its veto. He was also a member of Academia Sinica. In 1961, he was appointed ambassador to the United States while remaining representative to the United Nations. In 1961, he was appointed ambassador to the United States while remaining representative to the United Nations.

Tsiang retired in May 1965 and stayed in New York, where, at the invitation of Columbia University, he began to record an oral history of his life, intending afterwards to return to Academia Sinica and resume his research on modern Chinese history. He had completed about two-thirds of the memoir when he died of cancer in New York City on 9 October 1965, at the age of 69.

== Political and diplomatic views ==
1954 television interview

=== Political views ===
In domestic politics, Tsiang argued that China needed a unified, strong and efficient central government that could end civil war and whose orders the provinces would obey. On this basis, he supported an enlightened autocracy and rejected Hu Shih's proposals for a liberal parliamentary government. He held that economic development should come before political reform, arguing that creating more wealth and distributing it fairly mattered more to him than whether China had a constitution and a parliament. He also called on the government to reform itself and to carry out large-scale land reform to give "land to the tiller".

In 1938, Tsiang advocated a centralised authority that could override the popular will when necessary. He argued that China had to modernise quickly because of the many threats it faced. To Tsiang, the "iron rule of modern history" was that countries which used modernisation to preserve their national territory survived, while those that did not were destroyed. In his view, natural science and mechanised agriculture were the essential elements of modernisation. He wrote that such a focus on modernisation was supported by the "left-wing, right-wing, imperialist, anti-imperialist, man, woman, white, yellow, old, young".

During the Second Sino-Japanese War, Tsiang advocated that China develop a "total defense state" along the lines of Japan's. He saw such a commitment as a necessity of the historical era, not only of the current war. Consistent with the general views of the Nationalist Party, he believed that the war should be used to build a state based on principles of order rather than political liberties. After spending time in the United States during Franklin D. Roosevelt's New Deal, his views on political freedom and modernisation changed.

=== Foreign policy views ===
Tsiang regarded the northeast as the most serious problem in China's foreign relations, and he believed that abolishing the unequal treaties had to be balanced against maintaining friendly relations with other powers in order to resolve it. In November 1933, he praised the British minister to China, Miles Lampson, in an article in Independent Critic, arguing that Britain had become a help rather than an obstacle to China's national revival. He supported the proposals of the Lytton Commission as a basis for Sino-Japanese cooperation, arguing that China's most urgent task was modernisation and that this required good relations with all countries, including Japan. He also urged China to prepare for a long period of resistance of five to ten years, and argued that cooperation with the Soviet Union should play an important part in that plan.

As ambassador, Tsiang complained to the Ministry of Foreign Affairs that the Soviet Union encouraged China to resist Japan while avoiding any firm commitment itself, although he acknowledged that Soviet representatives had consistently supported China at the League of Nations. In December 1937, he advised the ministry to consult the Soviet Union before accepting any mediation of the war. In a speech in Changsha in January 1938, he called the Soviet Union China's best friend, explaining why it could not send troops while stressing the material and moral assistance it had provided.

== Assessment ==
The historian Kuo Ting-yee described Tsiang as a pioneer of the study of modern Chinese history who brought new methods and concepts to the field. The archaeologist Li Ji wrote that Tsiang had laid a scientific foundation for the study of modern Chinese history, not only by collecting primary sources but also by developing the concepts needed to interpret them. In mainland China, Tsiang's work was denounced in the early 1960s as reactionary. The historians Zhang Haipeng and Gong Yun later argued that his Zhongguo jindaishi reflected the dominant ideology of the Nationalist government and his own political views.

== Personal life ==
In 1923, Tsiang married Tang Yurui, a fellow student at Columbia University who had been one of ten women selected by Tsinghua in 1914 to study abroad, and the couple wed on the ship taking them back to China. They had four children. During the Second Sino-Japanese War, Tsiang began a relationship with Shen Enqin, also known as Hilda Shen, the wife of Shen Weitai, a younger Tsinghua alumnus whom Tsiang later had posted abroad. In 1948, Tsiang obtained a divorce in a Mexican court without Tang's consent, and on 21 July 1948 he married Shen. Tang did not recognise the divorce and brought an action for separation in New York, but the court set aside the service of the summons because Tsiang had diplomatic immunity as China's representative to the United Nations. She also appealed without success to the United Nations Commission on Human Rights and continued to appear at his public engagements. On 16 January 1950, a nephew of Tsiang, who resided in mainland China, denounced him in an open letter published in the People's Daily. Tsiang's will divided his estate equally between Shen and Tang, and both women attended his funeral.

== Honours ==
- Order of Brilliant Jade (1936)
- Order of Brilliant Star (1944)

== Selected writings ==
- Tingfu F. Tsiang, "Labor and Empire; a Study of the Reaction of British Labor, Mainly as Represented in Parliament to British Imperialism since 1880," Issued also as thesis (PH D) Columbia university Columbia university, 1923).
- "New Light on Chinese Diplomacy, 1836-49," The Journal of Modern History 3.4 (1931): 578–591.
- "The Extension of Equal Commercial Privileges to Other Nations Than the British after the Treaty of Nanking," The Chinese Social and Political Science Review 15.3 (1931): 422–44.
- "The Present Situation in China: A Critical Analysis," International Affairs (Royal Institute of International Affairs 1931–1939) 14.4 (1935): 496–513.
- "Chinese and European Expansion," Politica 2.5 (March 1936): 1–18.
- Zhongguo jindaishi dagang (Outline of Modern Chinese History) (Chongqing: Qingnian shudian, 1939; rpr. Beijing: Dongfang chubanshe, 1996).
- Jiang Tingfu Xuanji (Selected works of Jiang Tingfu) (Taipei: Wenxing, 1965 4 vols. Reprinted)
- Jiang Tingfu huiyilu (Memoirs of Jiang Tingfu), translated by Xie Zhonglian (Changsha: Yuelu shushe, 2003)

Diplomatic posts
Preceded by Quo Tai-chi	Permanent Representative and Ambassador of China to the United Nations; 1947–1962	Succeeded by Liu Chieh
