= George Yeh =

Chinese politician and diplomat (1904–1981)

- 葉公超
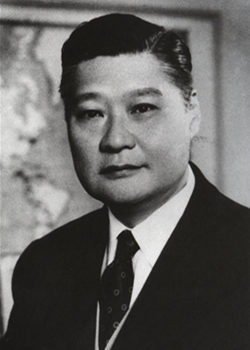

Chinese Ambassador to the United States
- In office August 1958 – November 1961
- Preceded by: Hollington Tong
- Succeeded by: Tsiang Tingfu

Minister of the Overseas Chinese Affairs Commission
- In office 19 May 1950 – 16 April 1952
- Preceded by: Dai Kuisheng
- Succeeded by: Zheng Yanfen

Minister of Foreign Affairs of the Republic of China
- In office 1 October 1949 – 14 July 1958
- Preceded by: Hu Shih
- Succeeded by: Huang Shao-ku

Personal details
- Born: 20 October 1904 Jiujiang, Jiangxi, China
- Died: 20 November 1981 (aged 77) Taipei, Taiwan
- Party: Kuomintang
- Education: Amherst College (BA); University of Cambridge (MPhil)

George Kung-chao Yeh (20 October 1904 – 20 November 1981), also known as Yeh Kung-chao, was a politician and diplomat Minister of Foreign Affairs of the Republic of China from 1949 to 1958.

== Biography ==
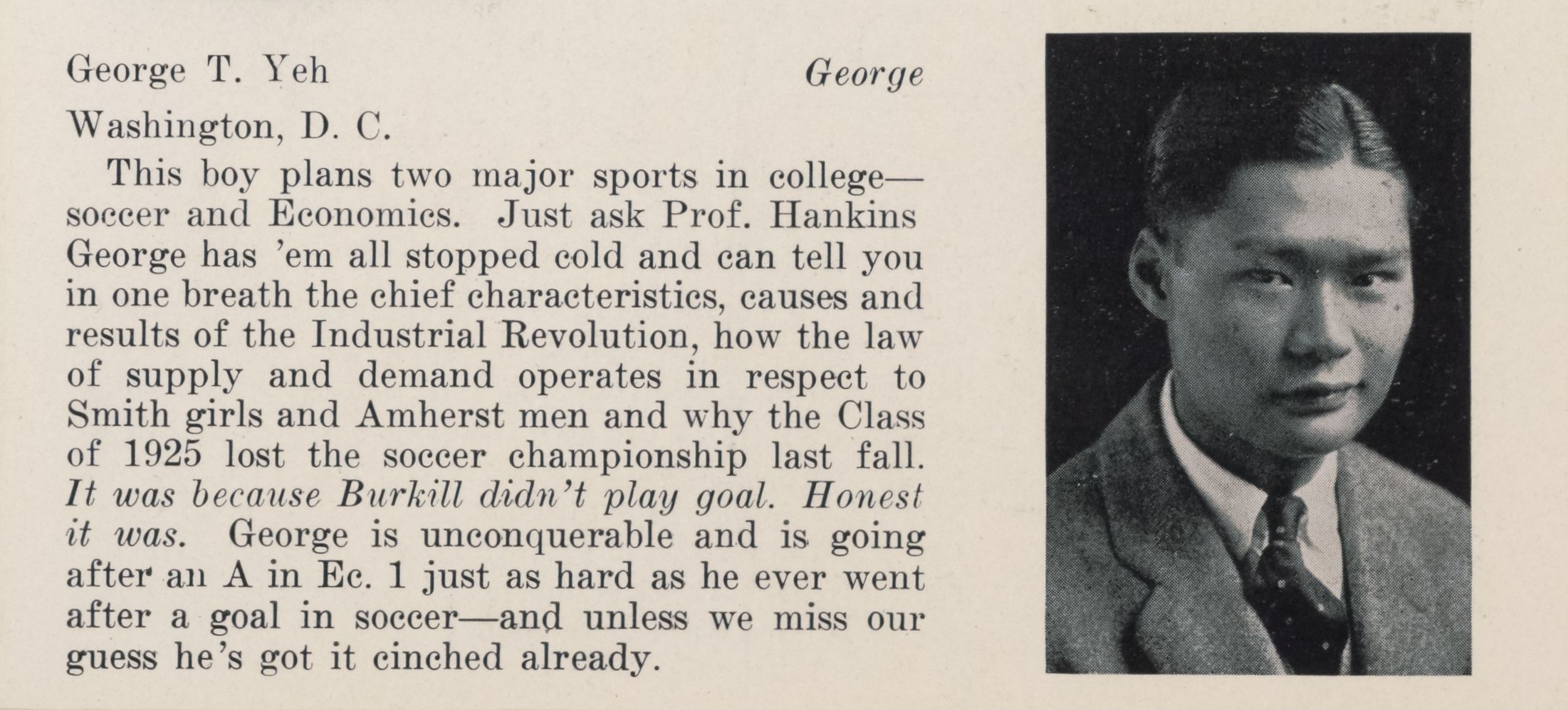
Yeh in the Amherst College yearbook, 1925

George Yeh
- Traditional Chinese: 葉公超
- Simplified Chinese: 叶公超
Transcriptions
Standard Mandarin
- Hanyu Pinyin: Yè Gōngchāo
- Wade–Giles: Yeh Kung-ch'ao

Educated in the U.S. and the U.K., he graduated from Amherst College in 1925 and later Cambridge University. He taught English literature at Beijing's Tsinghua University, where his students included renowned 20th century Chinese writer Ch'ien Chung-shu.

On February 6, 1950, the ROC air force bombed Shanghai, causing extensive damage to American-owned property in the city including the Shanghai power company. The American government responded by sending a diplomatic protest to the Nationalist Ministry of Foreign Affairs. Yeh defended the bombing to American diplomats and stated that the ROC would provide early warning before such attacks in the future. The United States rejected the proposed arrangement and the American chargé d'affaires warned Yeh that serious difficulties would arise if such things continued.

During his tenure, he signed the Sino-Japanese Peace Treaty in 1952 and the Sino-American Mutual Defense Treaty in 1954. He was ambassador to the United States from 1958 to 1961. In 1961, due to the admission of Mongolia to the United Nations, Yeh was removed from the position of ambassador and recalled to Taiwan by Chiang Kai-shek. He then served as Minister without Portfolio.

== See also ==
- Mongolia–Taiwan relations
