= Wu Tiecheng =

Republic of China politician (1888–1953)

- 吳鐵城
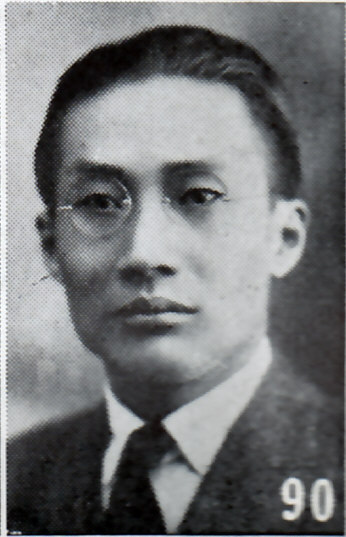
- Wu Tiecheng as pictured in The Most Recent Biographies of Chinese Dignitaries

Vice Premier of China
- In office 23 December 1948 – 21 March 1949
- Premier: Sun Fo; He Yingqin
- Preceded by: Chang Li-sheng
- Succeeded by: Chia Ching-teh

Mayor of Shanghai
- In office January 1932 – April 1937
- Preceded by: Zhang Qun
- Succeeded by: Yu Hung-chun

Personal details
- Born: 9 March 1888 Jiujiang, Jiangxi, Qing Dynasty
- Died: 19 November 1953 (aged 65) Taipei, Taiwan
- Party: Kuomintang
- Relatives: Wu Mei-yun (granddaughter)

Wu Tiecheng (traditional Chinese: 吳鐵城; simplified Chinese: 吴铁城; pinyin: Wú Tiěchéng; Wade–Giles: Wu Tieh-cheng; 9 March 1888 – 19 November 1953) was a politician of the Republic of China. He served as Mayor of Shanghai, Governor of Guangdong province, and was the Vice Premier and Foreign Minister in 1948–1949.

After communists were purged from the Kuomintang in the Canton Coup in 1926, Chiang negotiated a compromise whereby hardline members of the rightist faction, such as Wu Tiecheng, were removed from their posts in compensation for the purged leftists in order to prove his usefulness to the CPC and their Soviet sponsor, Joseph Stalin.

== See also ==
- List of vice premiers of the Republic of China

== Sources ==
- Jordan, Donald A. (1976). The Northern Expedition: China's National Revolution of 1926-1928. Honolulu: University Press of Hawaii. ISBN 9780824803520.
- Kotkin, Stephen (2014), Stalin, Volume I: Paradoxes of Power, 1878–1928, New York: Penguin Press, ISBN 978-1-59420-379-4
