= Standard of living in Taiwan =

Living conditions in Japan

The standard of living in Taiwan refers to the material conditions, income, consumption, housing, health, work, public services, and other factors that shape everyday life in Taiwan. Taiwan is often regarded by international organizations such as the International Monetary Fund as a high-income, developed country with long life expectancy, low crime, extensive public transport, and broad access to consumer goods and services. At the same time, its living standards have been affected by high housing costs in major cities, stagnant wages, an ageing population, regional disparities, and relatively high living costs for some goods and services.

The 1970s witnessed a big rise in living standards, which was characterized by the increased diffusion of various consumer durables. The average national life expectancy rise from around fifty-five years in 1950 to seventy-two years in 1985 and eight-one in 2025.

== History ==
During Qing rule, the standard of living in Taiwan was characterized by widespread poverty, extreme income inequalities, and endemic insecurity of livelihood. Malaria and plague were widespread in the towns. The sewage was dumped straight onto the street and soaked into the ground. After Taiwan was ceded to Japan, in July of 1896, a Scottish engineer, W. K. Burton, was brought in to look at the city of Taipei. He proposed the "Taihoku sanitary works plan", which included a separate water supply and sewage system. In 1900, an urban planning official named Yoshio Murakami drew up the plan that set the basic shape of modern Taipei. In 1908, the first public water works opened at the pumping station that is now the Museum of Drinking Water, which supplied about 20,000 tons of water a day to 120,000 residents.

After a period of hyperinflation in the late 1940s when the Kuomintang-led government of the Republic of China military regime of Chen Yi overprinted the Taiwanese dollar against the previous Taiwanese yen in the Japanese era, the government introduced a new and stable currency to address hyperinflation. With the US$4 billion in financial aid and soft credit provided by the United States (as well as the indirect economic stimulus of US food and military aid) over the 1945–1965 period, and a more direct infusion of US$41 billion in free development aid up until year 1975 (now worth $242 billion in 2024 values as adjusted for inflation). Taiwan thus had the necessary capital to restart its economy. Furthemore, a 9-years compulsory education and the importance of science in Taiwanese education and values was implement, which generated great success with consistent and strong growth and the stabilization of inflation.

A land reform law, inspired by the same one that the Americans were enacting in occupied Japan, removed the landlord class (similar to what happened in Japan), and created a higher number of peasants who, with the help of the state, increased the agricultural output dramatically. This marked the beginning of capital accumulation. It inverted capital creation, and liberated the agricultural workforce to work in the urban sectors. It removed the rent burdens on peasants, with former land owners using the government compensation to become the new capitalist class.

It also, with the help of USAID, created a massive industrial infrastructure, communications, and developed the educational system. Several government bodies were created and four-year plans were also enacted. Between 1952 and 1982, economic growth was on average 8.7%, and between 1983 and 1986 at 6.9%. The gross national product grew by 360% between 1965 and 1986. The percentage of global exports was over 2% in 1986, over other recently industrialized countries, and the global industrial production output grew a further 680% between 1965 and 1986. The social gap between the rich and the poor fell (Gini: 0.558 in 1953, 0.303 in 1980), even lower than some Western European countries, but it grew a little in the 80's. Health care, education, and quality of life also improved.

== Housing ==
Following the end of World War II and the Kuomintang's retreat to Taiwan, the nation experienced rapid population growth. The influx of military personnel and their families created an urgent demand for housing, which was addressed through the construction of military dependents' villages. These villages, often consisting of basic housing structures, were built to accommodate the families of soldiers but later became a part of Taiwan’s unique housing history.

In the 1970s, Taiwan’s economic growth led to increased urbanization, intensifying the demand for affordable urban housing. In response, the government launched a national public housing initiative in 1976, constructing approximately 390,000 units by 1985 to accommodate around 1.58 million residents. The project was administered by local government bodies, including the "National Housing Bureau", with a focus on providing housing to civil servants, rebuilding older military villages, and creating communities open for public purchase.

In the metropolitan areas, apartment buildings are built extremely close to each other. Condominiums with ten to twenty floors can be found even in suburbs. While lacking space, these houses offer all other amenities. In the cities, housing is expensive relative to annual income, even though the high cost is somewhat offset by low interest rates. For instance, the national capital, Taipei, is one of the most expensive and least affordable housing markets in the world and the second most expensive city in Asia. In 2025, Taipei has a House Price-to-Income Ratio of 15.41, making it significantly more expensive relative to local incomes than cities like London (9.1x), New York (7.4x), or Sydney (13.8x), and even exceeding Hong Kong (14.4x).

== Food ==
The Westernization of many areas of Japanese life includes consuming a diversity of foods. After World War II, Japanese dietary patterns changed and came to resemble those of the West.

According to health and nutrition surveys in Taiwan, average intake per day was 1,871 calories and 71 grams of protein per day in the 1990.

== Clothing ==
The Taiwan consumer benefits most from the availability of clothing products that are often popular exports. The textile industry was a major component of the economy of Taiwan and a main driver of the Taiwan Miracle. In 1949, Taiwan had 10,000 cotton spindles. In 1954, the Ministry of Economic Affairs established a committee to establish plans for textile industry. The Taiwan Textile Research Institute (TTRI), a government research institute, was founded in 1959. In 1964, the industry grew to 500,000 cotton spindles, making the cotton textiles industry the fastest growing industry in Taiwan at that time. As of 1965, the industry paid a total tax of NT$240 million to the government. Decades later with the growing petrochemical industry, man-made fiber dominated the field. In the 1960s one of the most visible signs of the economic boom was the appearance in Taiwanese cities of large quantities of relatively modern, varied, colorful clothes.

== Healthcare ==
As with other developed countries, Taiwanese people are well-nourished but face such health problems as chronic obesity and heart disease. The current healthcare system in Taiwan, known as National Health Insurance (NHI, Chinese: 全民健康保險), was instituted in 1995. NHI is a single-payer compulsory social insurance plan that centralizes the disbursement of healthcare funds. The system promises equal access to healthcare for all citizens. Population coverage reached 99.9% by the end of 2023.

In 2023, Taiwan had 2.3 physicians and 7.3 hospital beds per 1,000 population. There were 476 hospitals and 23,421 clinics in the country. Per capita health expenditures totaled US$2,522 in 2023. Health expenditures constituted 7.8% of the gross domestic product (GDP) in 2023; 63% of the expenditures were from public funds. Overall life expectancy in 2025 is 80.94 years.

According to the Numbeo Health Care Index in 2025, Taiwan has the best healthcare system in the world, scoring 86.5 out of 100, a slight increase from 86 the previous year. This marked the seventh consecutive year that Taiwan has ranked first in the Numbeo Health Care Index.

== Growing inequality ==
Over the past two decades or so, inequality in Taiwan has grown as a result of an export- and tech-heavy economy that has not distributed its gains evenly. Alongside the process of economic liberalization, Taiwanese enterprises have evolved into large-scale, highly integrated conglomerates. Meanwhile, driven by the trend of globalization, many of these firms have relocated their production bases to China, employing cost-cutting strategies to ensure their survival. Despite their expanding scale, these companies have seen their profit margins steadily shrink, and most remain under the control of their founding families. Once the foundation of Taiwan's "economic miracle", small and medium-sized enterprises are now facing mounting pressure. Furthermore, industrial clusters that were once deeply rooted locally, comprising diverse networks of suppliers, have transformed into structures that are more flexible but also less stable.

== See also ==
- Economy of Taiwan
- Standard of living in Japan
