= Kwan Sung-sing =

Chinese architect and entrepreneur

- 關頌聲
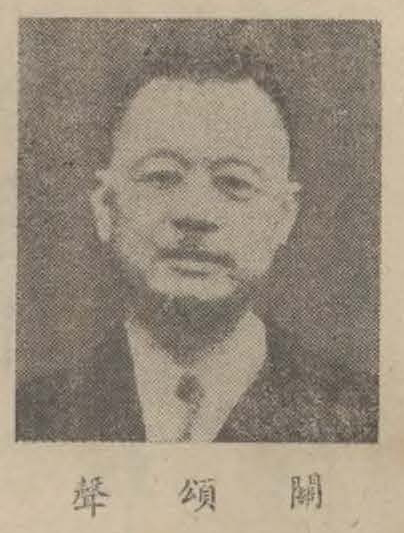
- Born: August 29, 1892; Weihaiwei, Shandong, Qing dynasty
- Died: November 27, 1960 (aged 68); Beitou, Yangmingshan Administrative Bureau, Taiwan, Republic of China
- Education: St. John's University, Shanghai; Tsinghua University; Massachusetts Institute of Technology (BArch); Harvard University
- Occupations: construction engineer, architect, entrepreneur

Kwan Sung-sing
- Traditional Chinese: 關頌聲
- Simplified Chinese: 关颂声
- Postal: Kwan Sung-sing
Transcriptions
Standard Mandarin
- Hanyu Pinyin: Guān Sòngshēng
- Wade–Giles: Kuan^{1} Sung^{4}-sheng^{1}
- Tongyong Pinyin: Guan Sòngsheng
Yue: Cantonese
- Yale Romanization: Gwaan^{1} Jung^{6}seng^{1}
- Jyutping: Gwaan^{1} Zung^{6}-seng^{1}

Kwan Sung-sing (29 August 1892 – 27 November 1960) was a Chinese construction engineer, architect, entrepreneur, founder of the architectural firm Kwan, Chu and Yang Architects (Chinese: 基泰工程司) and a member of Hongmen. He was also an activist who promoted track and field sports in the Republic of China during the 1950s, and was thus hailed as "the father of track and field in Taiwan." He was born in Weihai, Shandong, Qing China.

== Life ==
=== In Mainland China ===
Kwan Sung-sing was born in Weihaiwei on August 29, 1892. When he attended the Lingnan school (嶺南學校), he was heavily influenced by the school chancellor Chung Jung-hua (Chinese: 鍾榮華; pinyin: Zhōng Rónghuá; Wade–Giles: Jung^{1} Wing^{4}-wa^{4}), who was a member of the revolutionary Tongmenghui. He cut off his queue—a sign of rebellion against the Qing dynasty. As a result, in 1907, Kwan's father, Dr. King-Yin Kwan (Chinese: 關景賢; pinyin: Guān Jǐngxián; Wade–Giles: Kuan^{1} Ching^{3}-hsien^{2}), had to entrust his friend Wu Tingfang to take Kwan to study in the United States.

Kwan began his studies in the US at Dummer Academy. However, in 1908, he transferred to Phillips Academy Andover. During this time, Kwan was a member of the school's soccer team, serving as the captain. He was also a sprinter on the track team. Though a member of Andover Class of 1912, Kwan left the school in 1911 as a "non-returning middler", which was common at the time.

Later in 1911, Kwan attended St. John's University and was admitted to the Tsinghua School (now Tsinghua University). During his time at Tsinghua, he placed first both in the 1913 Far Eastern Games track and field 880 yard run and the Discus event. He also placed second in the one-mile relay. Kwan entered MIT in 1914 and received a bachelor's degree in architecture in 1917. In 1919, Kwan studied city management for another year at Harvard University.

In 1919, Kwan returned to his home country to forge a career. In 1920, he established an architecture firm named "Kwan, Chu & Yang Architects" in Tianjin. He was also an engineering counselor to Tianjin's police department and the chief architect at Beining Road (北甯路), Tianjin. He assisted in supervising the construction of the Peking Union Medical College. Kwan was also a member of the engineering branch of Nanjing’s capital construction committee. In 1928, he was involved in the process of categorizing the engineering schools of China, and he later became a fellow of the Chinese Engineering Society (中國營造學社).

In the beginning of the Second Sino-Japanese War, Kwan found himself stuck in Northern China. The Japanese asked that he lead the Public Constructions Department of the puppet Manchukuo government, but he declined and instead escaped to the city of Chongqing, which was still controlled by the Republic of China. During the war, he voluntarily assisted in the construction of the Jiangyin Defences (江陰防禦工程), located at a strategic position on the Yangtze. He was caught in multiple bombing raids by the Japanese air force, and his life was endangered on multiple occasions.

In 1937, the Genealogy of The Kwan Family of Fanyu, Guangdong (廣東番禺關氏家譜) was published. Kwan helped to edit the book.

In the 1940s, Kwan came to fame as a structural engineer in China. He was known alongside other engineers including Chen Chih (Chinese: 陳植; pinyin: Chén Zhí) and Chao Shen (Chinese: 趙深; pinyin: Zhào Shēn). Before the ROC government moved to Taiwan in 1949, Kwan, Chu and Yang Architects had branches located in Shanghai, Nanjing, Chongqing, Guangzhou, Shenyang and Hong Kong. The architecture firm had completed hundreds of projects, including Nanking Central Stadium (now the campus of Nanjing Sport Institute) in 1933, Nanking Central Hospital (now Nanjing General Hospital of People's Liberation Army) in 1934, the library of the University of Nanking in 1937, and the Central Bank in Caojiadu (漕家渡), Chongqing in 1940.

=== In Taiwan ===
==== Track and field proponent ====
In 1949, Kwan Sung-sing and his family moved to Taiwan with the intent of supporting track and field sports in the nation. From 1952 to 1957, he served as a Taiwan Provincial Games track and field starter. While he was serving as the starter, he brought his own cap gun and wore formal attire, which made him something of an attraction in the early Provincial Games and gained him the name "Guanlaoye" (Chinese: 關老爺, Sir Kwan) and the nickname "Guanfaling" (Chinese: 關發令, Kwan the starter).

Kwan accompanied the ROC World Games delegation to Rome to participate in the 1960 Summer Olympics. After the event, he travelled to various European countries for leisure purposes, but when he returned to Hong Kong, he read a news article from Taipei forwarded by a foreign news agency, claiming that he and Yi kuo-jui (Chinese: 易國瑞; pinyin: Yì Guóruì) had travelled to Paris purely for fun. He found this to be quite a pity and responded to the reporter saying: "I would not do such a thing."

In regards to coaches and athletic leaders, Kwan believed that they should have a decent character, good attitude, and substantial knowledge so that the athletes would look up to them. He recalled that in the sports community of China, there were athletic trainers and coaches who did not demonstrate enough leadership and were just holding onto the athletes for their own fame. This tradition, Kwan observed, would result in bad habits for the athletes. Kwan said, "One does not promote good athletes for themselves. It is like gardening, that the true fun happens when everybody appreciates the blossoming flower." In this way, Kwan decided to support the track and field movement in Taiwan and patronize the athletes. He was named "the father of Taiwan’s track and field sports," for he coached two Olympic medalists: Yang Chuan-kwang and Chi Cheng.

===== Coaching Yang Chuan-kwang =====
May you be diligent and aspiring,
and may you be humble to all teachings, both academically and athletically,
and may you not take pride in petty achievements.
A successful person should have a perfect character besides strong academics.

— On Jan 22, 1959, Yang Chuan-kwang was admitted by the University of California, Los Angeles.
Kwan wrote his protege a letter of congratulation.

For Yang Chuan-kwang, Kwan hired Bob Mathias—decathlon winner of the 1936 Summer Olympics and the 1952 Summer Olympics—and other track experts to Taiwan to demonstrate techniques for him. Kwan also funded Yang's education abroad. Once, Kwan mentioned to Chiang Liang-kuei that coaching Yang was the "best-designed engineering project" in his life. Kwan also oversaw Yang's training in the United States with great care. Kwan paid for all of Yang's expenses in the United States, including his music albums and dentist fees. Kwan's children once said, "When we want something, we dare not tell our father; but when Yang wants something, he does not need to tell our father about it– our father would have bought it for him already." To find more "potential Yang Chuan-kwangs" in Taiwan, Kwan decided to travel back and forth for the Provincial Games.

At the 1956 Summer Olympics, Kwan and his wife witnessed Yang's loss. They then traveled to a friend's, surnamed Chen, house and drank some whiskey with the ROC delegate Li Pu-sheng (Chinese: 李樸生; pinyin: Lǐ Púshēng) to ease the pain caused by the loss. However, Kwan remained undiscouraged by the loss and instead encouraged Yang to continue his efforts. When Yang was at UCLA, Kwan sent Yang 80 US dollars a month as a stipend. Yang told a reporter, "This is not a long-term solution, for I am worried that Mr. Kwan would be too burdened. But I don't have a current solution to my financial problem."

After Yang won a medal in the 1960 Summer Olympics in Rome, Kwan was interviewed by Yao Feng-pan in his office on Fushun street (撫順街), Taipei. He mentioned that Yang only wrote three letters to him when Yang was living in the United States: the first one was written shortly after Yang arrived, in which Yang hoped that Kwan would take care of his family members in Taitung; in the second one, Yang pleaded Kwan not to call him back to Taiwan so he could continue his studies in UCLA; in the third one, Yang expressed his intention to stay in the United States for further studies after attending the Olympics at Rome. Meanwhile, Kwan's sister's father-in-law and Kwan's eldest son's family were both in the United States, and Yang visited both of them often. These family members of Kwan introduced Yang to other fellow Chinese Americans. Yang's coach in the U.S., Wei Cheng-wu (Chinese: 魏振武; pinyin: Wèi Zhèngwǔ), took Yang out for entertainment reasons on the weekends as well, and Wei sent Kwan weekly letters. f

===== Coaching Chi Cheng =====
One day you will be the best in the world,
and you will be acknowledged by the world.
And for your cause, they will know that you are from Taiwan, from the Republic of China.

— Kwan’s speech to Chi.

Kwan told reporters that he desired to continue helping young people discover their athletic talents. He paid specific attention to the female track and field athletes Chi Cheng and Zhang Xingzi (Chinese: 張幸子; pinyin: Zhāng Xìngzǐ). He particularly focused on Chi Cheng, believing that she had the ability to become "a female Yang Chuan-kwang."

One night in 1958, after returning from the provincial games, Kwan and his wife Chang Ching-hsia (Chinese: 張靜霞; pinyin: Zhāng Jìngxía) took a walk in the garden. Suddenly, he bent down, looked at a flower and said to his wife, "I found a girl with a talent in track and field, and I wanted to cultivate her!" Kwan saw that Chi Cheng had a particularly good run at the Provincial Games, so he wanted her to come to Taipei to study at Li Xing Middle School (勵行中學). He also supported Chi Cheng financially for 500 NTD every month for her nutrition. He boasted to the reporters of United Daily News that Chi had great elasticity and physical form and therefore she had great potential.

Before the 1960 Summer Olympics, Chi participated in the 100-meter selection trial in Taiwan. Her times in the 100-meter dash were still a little behind the standard. Kwan, who served as the starter, asked Chi to run before he fired the gun, thus helping her qualify for a spot in the ROC Olympic delegation.

Chi last saw Kwan at the Rome Olympics. Later, she once passed by N Zhongshan Rd (中山北路) in Taipei and thought about looking for Kwan at his firm, but she was too busy with her own affairs. Later, Chi left for the United States and never saw her coach Kwan again.

=== Career ===
Kwan was the chairman of the Taiwan Guild of Architects, and had repeatedly rejected Zhou Enlai’s request to return to mainland China. Kwan, Chu and Yang Architects, an architectural firm owned by Sung Sing Kwan, also moved to Taiwan and designed buildings including the Man Yee Building and the Shaw Building (邵氏大厦) in Hong Kong. Other works include the Taiwan Man-made Fiber Cooperation, Taipei Comprehensive Stadium, The Provincial Stadium of Taiwan in Taichung (now the Gymnasium of the National Taiwan University of Sport). On March 28, 1955, the Taiwan Nursing Home (now the Taiwan Adventist Hospital), founded by the Seventh-day Adventist Church, located on Zhongzheng Road (中正路) in Taipei City, had an opening ceremony. The ceremony was held by Soong Mei-ling, where she accepted a golden key from the Kwan, the construction engineer of the building. In 1957, Kwan led a delegation of the Architectural Engineers Association of Taiwan Province to visit Japan, Hong Kong, and other places. In 1960, he served as Chairman of Taiwan Handicraft Center.

On August 18, 1959, the Track and Field Association of the Republic of China was established. Kwan served as its first chairman.

=== Charity ===
Kwan was also known for his generosity in organizations including the Freemasons, the Rotary Club, and the Hongmen. Once, when he discussed his financial situation with a reporter, he said that he spent almost all his savings after coming to Taiwan. Later he noted that his architectural firm in Taiwan was starting to lose money. Its expenses were around 100,000 NTD per year, but its income was only around 50 to 60 thousand. Therefore, he had to rely on his firm branches in Hong Kong. However, he continued to support athletes despite his financial situation. At the opening of the Taiwan Handicraft Promotion Center, he told reporters that he visited Chang Ying-wu (Chinese: 張英武; pinyin: Zhāng Yīngwǔ, whom he never had known) at the Taipei Veterans General Hospital for charity reasons a few days ago. Recalling Kwan's deeds on the day he died, Yin Chung-jung told reporters that Kwan never turned down people's requests and was very keen to donate money for the poor and the sick. Yin also praised that Kwan often donated large sums of money despite his own financial situation, and was a great, devoted friend.

=== Death ===
On November 26, 1960, Kwan suffered a heart attack after he returned home and took a shower. Around midnight, Kwan felt uncomfortable and was immediately admitted to the hospital. He was diagnosed with a clogged artery by Dr. Chiang, whom he was acquainted with, and Dr. Huang, who came from Beitou. Kwan died at around 3 in the morning in his apartment at 146 Wenquan Rd, Beitou. Before his death, Kwan was accompanied by his wife Chang, his friend Yin Chung-jung, and Yin's wife. However, Kwan's two sons and three daughters were all in the United States at the time of his death.

Kwan's last words were: "Although I have accomplished many things in my life, I have spent most of my money brought from the mainland on promoting sports in Taiwan in recent years. Therefore, I expect a brief and non-luxurious funeral, and I hope my old friends will take care of my descendants." He also expressed his wish to be cremated, and that his ashes would be preserved to later be buried alongside his first wife on the Mainland.

In Kwan's will, he specifically outlined that Yen Shui-long would create a mosaic about sports at the Taiwan Provincial Stadium in Taichung.

At the Taiwan Handcraft Center, a bereavement committee for Kwan was established, consisting of Chang Ch'ün, Zhang Pi-te (Chinese: 張彼德; pinyin: Zhāng Bǐdé), Yin Chung-jung, Jack C. K. Teng, Hao Keng-sheng, Liu Ching-shan (Chinese: 劉景山; pinyin: Liú Jǐngshān), Koh Chih-chin (Chinese: 葛之覃; pinyin: Gě Zhīqín), Lin Hung-tan (Chinese: 林鴻坦; pinyin: Lín Hóngtǎn), along the representatives of the Music Club (及聲社), the Rotary Club, the Tsinghua Alum Union, the Chinese Charity Fund (中國慈壇社), the Chinese Freemasonry, the Kwan, Chu & Yang Architecture Firm, the Kun-zhong Contact Agency of Hongmen, Chinese Christian Women Prayer Society and Chinese Track & Field Committee. Yin Chung-jung was elected to be its president. Chow Shu-kai (Chinese: 周書楷; pinyin: Zhōu Shūkǎi), C.K. Teng and Liu Ching-shan were elected vice-presidents. Koh Chih-chin was elected secretary general, and Lin Hung-tan, Liu Pi-chang (Chinese: 劉璧章; pinyin: Liú Bìzhāng), Chu Liu-mei (Chinese: 初毓梅; pinyin: Chū Liúméi) and Kao Chung-hsiang (Chinese: 高重翔; pinyin: Gāo Chóngxiáng) were elected vice-secretaries general.

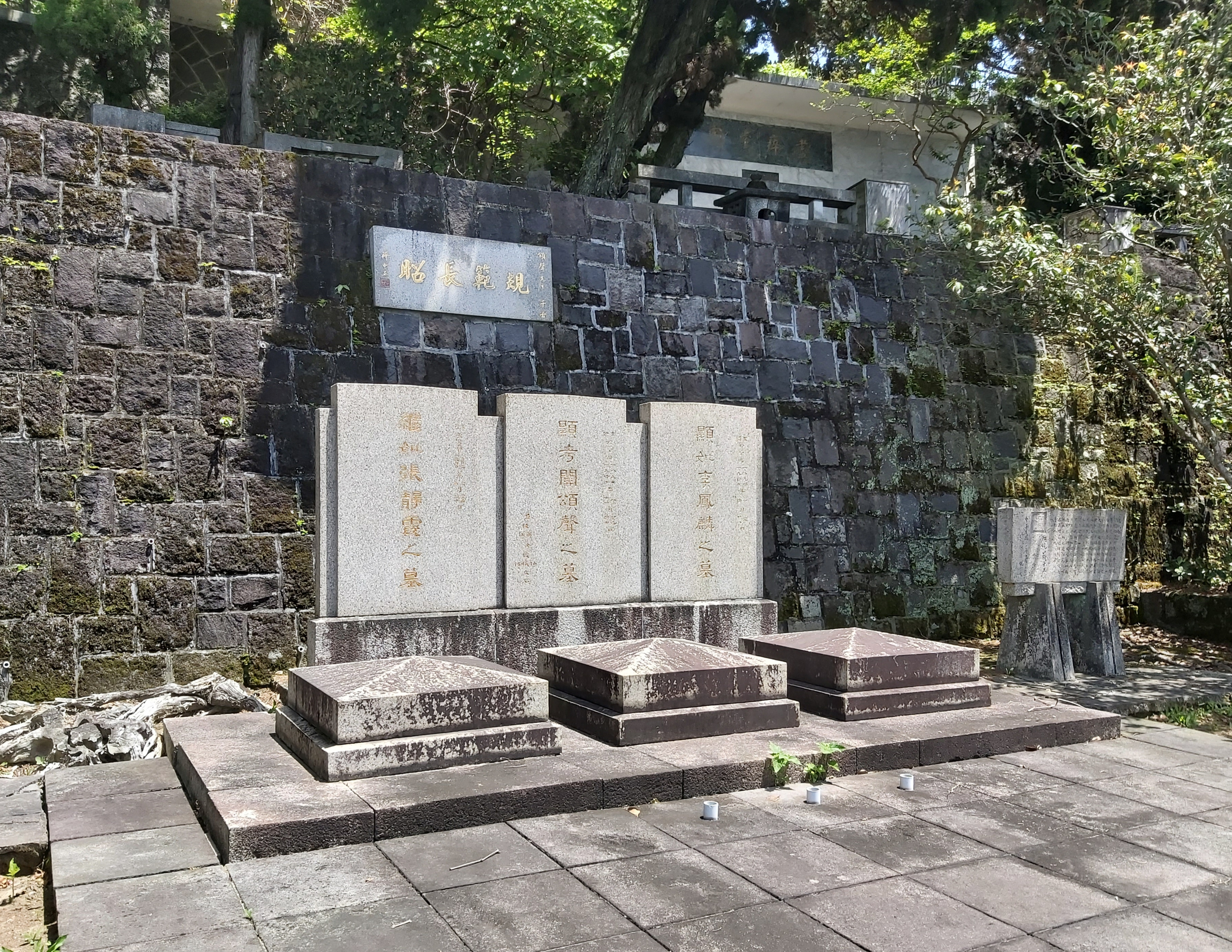
Tomb of Kwan Sung-sing in 2025

On December 3, 1960, Kwan was cremated at Taipei Funeral Parlor. Chiang Kai-shek had gifted him a banner saying "規範長昭" (May his principles and examples last). Kwan's memorial hall was set up at the gym of the International House of Taipei. His line of wreaths extended from the gates of this memorial hall and into the road for about 100 meters. Over two thousand people attended his funeral, including his friends such as Yu Youren, Chang Ch'ün, Hu Shih, Huang Chieh, Chu Chia-hua, Wang Shu-ming (Chinese: 王叔銘), Jack C. K. Teng, Yang Sen, Li Li-pai (Chinese: 李立柏; pinyin: Lǐ Lìbǎi), and Lyu Chin-hua (Chinese: 呂錦花; pinyin: Lǚ Jǐnhuā). Kwan's fifth son, Kwan Chun-wu (Chinese: 關俊伍; pinyin: Guān Jùnwǔ) was in Canada at the time and could not attend his father's cremation.

== Legacy ==
In 1961, Kwan Sung-sing and his family received official praise from the ROC. In the same year, Yen Shui-long completed a mural about Kwan at the Taiwan Provincial Stadium. When Yen was asking for funding from the Ministry of Education of ROC, he recalled Kwan's generous coaching of Yang and felt embarrassed to ask for a high price. In the end, he only asked for 80,000 NTD.

In 1963, Yang set a world record for the decathlon, as he scored over 9,000 points. On April 30 of the same year, the Minister of Education, Huang Chi-lu, and the Superintendent of Education, Hao Keng-sheng, visited Kwan's grave at the base of Yangming Mountain and laid wreaths. A eulogy delivered in his honor said: "Mr. Kwan, now you may rest in peace and joy... "

Before the start of the 1966 Asian Games, a journalist interviewed Chi. Chi said that she had not seen Kwan since the Rome Olympics, and suddenly she covered her face in sadness. Many years later, when Chi was interviewed by Dongsen in 2012, she was asked about the fact that Kwan allowed her to have a false start. She said, "The old-generation of track judges all knew this. After running 100 meters, my time was right at the admittance standard for the Olympics delegation. Therefore, without Kwan, I could not have achieved this level of success."

Both Yang and Chi came to Kwan's grave and knelt on November 27, 1968. Yang placed a black marble statue of himself right next to Kwan's grave, saying that he wished the statue would accompany Kwan for him. Chi offered a yellow rose, placed her hands upon the tombstone and knelt for a long time.

In 2010, Kwan's descendants donated a large sum to create Tsinghua University's "Sports Honor Hall" in Beijing.

== Family ==
Kwan Sung-sing's ancestors were from Panyu, Guangdong. His family members were Christians and supporters of Sun Yat-Sen's revolution. Kwan's grandfather, Kwan Yuen-cheong (Chinese: 關元昌; pinyin: Guān Yuánchāng) was a pioneer in Chinese dentistry. Kwan's father, Kwan King-yin, was Dr. Sun Yat-Sen’s classmate at medical school, and was a former imperial doctor. Kwan's uncle, Kwan King-leung (Chinese: 關景良; pinyin: Guān Jǐngliáng), was a revolutionary. Kwan's aunt, Kwan Yuet-ping (Chinese: 關月屏; pinyin: Guān Yuèpíng), was the first wife of Won Bing-chung (Chinese: 溫秉忠; pinyin: Wēn Bǐngzhōng), who later became the brother-in-law of Charlie Soong. Kwan's younger brother, Kwan Sung-tao (Chinese: 關頌韜; pinyin: Guān Sòngtāo), was a famous doctor.

Kwan's first wife, Li Feng-lin (Chinese: 李鳳麟; pinyin: Lǐ Fènglín), was Song Meiling’s classmate at Wesleyan College. On April 28, 1947, Li died of illness in Shanghai at the age of 54.

Kwan's niece is Nancy Kwan. She travelled from Hong Kong to Taipei to visit Kwan's family in June 1962.

Kwan's great granddaughter is Twitch Streamer Caroline Kwan. She is still alive and talked about her great grandfather during stream.
