= Yen Chia-kan =

President of the Republic of China from 1975 to 1978

- 嚴家淦
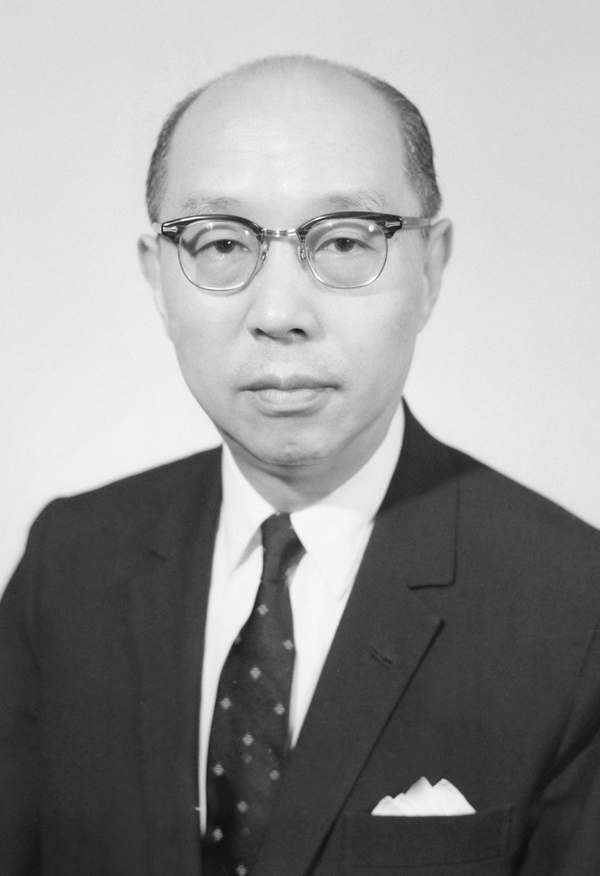

2nd President of the Republic of China
- In office 5 April 1975 – 20 May 1978
- Premier: Chiang Ching-kuo (Note: After Chiang Kai-shek's death in 1975, Yen was the constitutional successor to the office of president. However, then-Premier Chiang Ching-kuo held power as the Chairman of the Kuomintang.)
- Vice President: Vacant (Note: Yen succeeded to the presidency from the vice presidency, leaving the latter position vacant from 1975 to 1978.)
- Preceded by: Chiang Kai-shek
- Succeeded by: Chiang Ching-kuo

3rd Vice President of the Republic of China
- In office 20 May 1966 – 5 April 1975
- President: Chiang Kai-shek
- Preceded by: Chen Cheng
- Succeeded by: Hsieh Tung-min

5th Premier of the Republic of China
- In office 16 December 1963 – 29 May 1972
- President: Chiang Kai-shek
- Vice Premier: Yu Ching-tang; Huang Shao-ku; Chiang Ching-kuo
- Preceded by: Chen Cheng
- Succeeded by: Chiang Ching-kuo
Ministerial offices
Minister without Portfolio
In office 26 January 1950 – 24 December 1963
Premier	Chen Cheng; Yu Hung-chun; Chen Cheng
6th and 8th Minister of Finance
In office 19 March 1958 – 14 December 1963
Premier	Yu Hung-chun; Chen Cheng
Preceded by	P. Y. Shu
Succeeded by	Chen Ching-yu
In office 12 March 1950 – 26 May 1954
Premier	Chen Cheng
Preceded by	Kuan Chi-yu
Succeeded by	P. Y. Shu
5th Chairman of the Taiwan Provincial Government
In office 7 June 1954 – 16 August 1957
Appointed by	Executive Yuan
Premier	Yu Hung-chun
Preceded by	Yu Hung-chun
Succeeded by	Chow Chih-jou
1st Minister of Vocational Assistance Commission for Retired Servicemen
In office 1 November 1954 – 24 April 1956
Premier	Yu Hung-chun
Preceded by	Position established
Succeeded by	Chiang Ching-kuo
5th Minister of Economic Affairs
In office 10 February 1950 – 16 March 1950
Premier	Chen Cheng
Preceded by	Hangchen Liu
Succeeded by	Cheng Tao-ru

Personal details
- Born: 23 October 1905 Mudu, China
- Died: 24 December 1993 (aged 88) Taipei, Taiwan
- Resting place: Wuzhi Mountain Military Cemetery
- Party: Kuomintang
- Spouse: Liu Chi-chun (m. 1924)
- Children: 9
- Education: St. John's University, Shanghai (BS)
- Profession: Chemist; Politician; economist
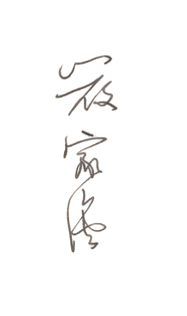
- Signature

Yen Chia-kan
- Traditional Chinese: 嚴家淦
Transcriptions
Standard Mandarin
- Hanyu Pinyin: Yán Jiāgàn
- Bopomofo: ㄧㄢˊ ㄐㄧㄚㄍㄢˋ
- Wade–Giles: Yen2 Chia1-kan4
- IPA: [jɛ̌n.tɕjá.kân]
Wu
- Romanization: nyie cia/ka koe
Southern Min
- Hokkien POJ: Giâm Ka-kàn

Milk name
- Traditional Chinese: 嚴雨蓀
Transcriptions
Standard Mandarin
- Hanyu Pinyin: Yán Yǔsūn
- Bopomofo: ㄧㄢˊ ㄩˇㄙㄨㄣ
- Wade–Giles: Yen2 Yü3-sun1
- IPA: [jɛ̌n.jòʊ.swə́n]

Given name and Courtesy name
- Traditional Chinese: 嚴靜波
Transcriptions
Standard Mandarin
- Hanyu Pinyin: Yán Jìngbó
- Bopomofo: ㄧㄢˊ ㄐㄧㄥˋㄅㄛˊ
- Wade–Giles: Yen2 Ching4-po2
- IPA: [jɛ̌n.tɕíŋ.pwǒ]

Pen name
- Traditional Chinese: 嚴蘭芬
Transcriptions
Standard Mandarin
- Hanyu Pinyin: Yán Lánfēn
- Bopomofo: ㄧㄢˊ ㄌㄢˊㄈㄣ
- Wade–Giles: Yen2 Lan2-fên1
- IPA: [jɛ̌n.lǎn.fə́n]

Yen Chia-kan (Chinese: 嚴家淦; pinyin: Yán Jiāgàn; Wade–Giles: Yen^{2} Chia^{1}-kan^{4}; 23 October 1905 – 24 December 1993), also known as C. K. Yen, was a Chinese politician, chemist, and economist who was the 2nd president of the Republic of China from 1975 to 1978. As a member of the Kuomintang (KMT), he served in various important government positions throughout his lifetime, including Minister of Finance, Premier of the Republic of China, and Vice President of the Republic of China.

On 5 April 1975, Yen Chia-kan succeeded Chiang Kai-shek as the 2nd President of the Republic of China, being sworn in on 6 April 1975, and served out the remainder of Chiang Kai-shek's term. On 20 May 1978, after his term elapsed, he did not seek reelection and was succeeded by Chiang Kai-shek’s son, Chiang Ching-kuo. As the first civilian President of the Republic of China, he implemented many reforms including the shift from using Literary Chinese to the written vernacular in government documents and successfully responded to the 1973 oil crisis.

Unlike his controversial predecessor, Chiang Kai-shek, Yen Chia-kan’s reputation and legacy is positive due to the many successful economic policies that he implemented throughout his life both in mainland China and in Taiwan. Due to his successful implementation of the New Taiwan dollar as the chairman of the Bank of Taiwan in 1949, Yen Chia-kan is widely known as the “father of the New Taiwan Dollar".

== Names ==
In accordance with traditional Chinese practices, Yen Chia-kan used multiple names throughout his life. At his birth, he was assigned a milk name, which was Yen Yü-sun (Chinese: 嚴雨蓀; pinyin: Yán Yǔsūn; Wade–Giles: Yen^{2} Yü^{3}-sun^{1}). As he grew older, he was given a first name, Yen Ching-po (Chinese: 嚴靜波; pinyin: Yán Jìngbō; Wade–Giles: Yen^{2} Ching^{4}-po^{1}), which he also used as his courtesy name. Later, he chose a pen name for himself, which was Yen Lan-fên (Chinese: 嚴蘭芬; pinyin: Yán Lánfēn; Wade–Giles: Yen^{2} Lan^{2}-fên^{1}). During his adulthood, he changed his name to the name that he is commonly known by, which is Yen Chia-kan (Chinese: 嚴家淦; pinyin: Yán Jiāgàn; Wade–Giles: Yen^{2} Chia^{1}-kan^{4}).

== Early life and education ==
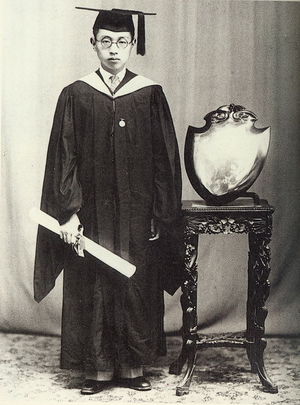
Graduation photo of Yen Chia-kan from St. John’s University, 1926

Yen Chia-kan was born in Mudu in 1905 to a prestigious Soochow family, the Yan (Yen) Family of Dongshan (東山嚴氏). His family was large and moderately wealthy. In 1910, at the age of 5, he began formal education at the Mudu Primary School. In 1926, at the age of 21, he graduated from St. John's University in Shanghai with a Bachelor of Science (B.S.) degree in chemistry.

== Early career ==
In 1931, Yen Chia-kan began serving as a manager of the Shanghai railway administration.

== Wartime career ==
During the Second World War, Yen Chia-kan started to work as director of the finance department of Fuchien Provincial Government and the government of the Kwangtung Province in 1938. During his tenure, he initiated a policy of land tax for farmers with their agricultural produce to alleviate the dual problem of food shortages and an empty treasury. This policy was then adopted nationwide across China and contributed significantly for the national food supply during World War II.

In 1939, the following year, Yen Chia-kan was appointed director of the Department of Finance of the Fuchien Provincial Government, which was responsible for raising wartime levies for the Fuchien Province. While in this office, Yen Chia-kan abolished more than 70 miscellaneous taxes and improved the province's finances by balancing the budget. As a result of his fiscal policies, the province’s annual budget was balanced and the deficit was significantly reduced.

Later in the course of the war, Yen Chia-kan was appointed by the National Government of the Republic of China to be the procurement director of the War Production Board. As the procurement director of the War Production Board, Yen Chia-kan was in charge of supplies procured from both American Lend-Lease and the British and Canadian loan programs. During his tenure in this office, he twice visited India to expedite deliveries over "The Hump".

== Retreat to Taiwan and subsequent years ==
When Yen Chia-kan arrived in Taiwan in October 1945, he was appointed transportation director for the Taiwan Provincial Government. He was later named provincial finance director. From the provincial government, Yen Chia-kan was subsequently elevated to chairman of the Bank of Taiwan. As the chairman of the Bank of Taiwan, Yen Chia-kan began issuing the New Taiwan dollar on 15 June 1949 to replace the Old Taiwan dollar, which was experiencing hyperinflation due to the Chinese Civil War. In order to stabilize the economy, he also imported 10,000 tons of rice from Southeast Asia. Due to the success of the New Taiwan Dollar and his other economic policies during the postwar era, Yen Chia-kan became known as the “father of the New Taiwan Dollar”.

In 1950, Yen Chia-kan was appointed Minister of Economic Affairs, and then moved to the Ministry of Finance. Under the authorization of Premier Chen Cheng, Yen Chia-kan, together with Yin Chung-jung and Yang Chi-tseng, oversaw Taiwan's economic and fiscal affairs. The trio became widely known as the "Yin–Yen–Yang iron triangle" of finance and economics. Chen Cheng reportedly remarked to them, "I am a soldier by training and have had no prior experience in economics. Even after serving over four years as Premier, the rapid changes in the economy are beyond my grasp. From now on, any proposals and recommendations jointly put forward by the three of you will receive my full support."

According to former Deputy Minister of the Council for Economic Planning and Development Yeh Wan-an, the three were long-time friends, though Yin Chung-jung and Yang Chi-tseng frequently engaged in heated debates over differing viewpoints, with Yen Chia-kan often acting as a mediator to resolve their disagreements. In this capacity, Yin Chung-jung, together with Chen Cheng and Yen Chia-kan, promoted Li Kwoh-ting.

Yen Chia-kan remained Minister of Finance until 1954, when he was appointed Governor of Taiwan. From 1957 to 1958, he served as chairman of the Council for United States Aid, then returned to the Ministry of Finance and stayed there until 1963. During his second term as Minister of Finance, Yen Chia-kan adopted economic policies that encouraged investment and exports. The rapid growth of Taiwan’s economy and its subsequent industrialization allowed the United States to announce in June 1965 the termination of economic assistance to the Republic of China, which was seen as a major success for Yen Chia-kan’s economic policies and Chiang Kai-shek administration.

== Vice-presidency and Premiership ==
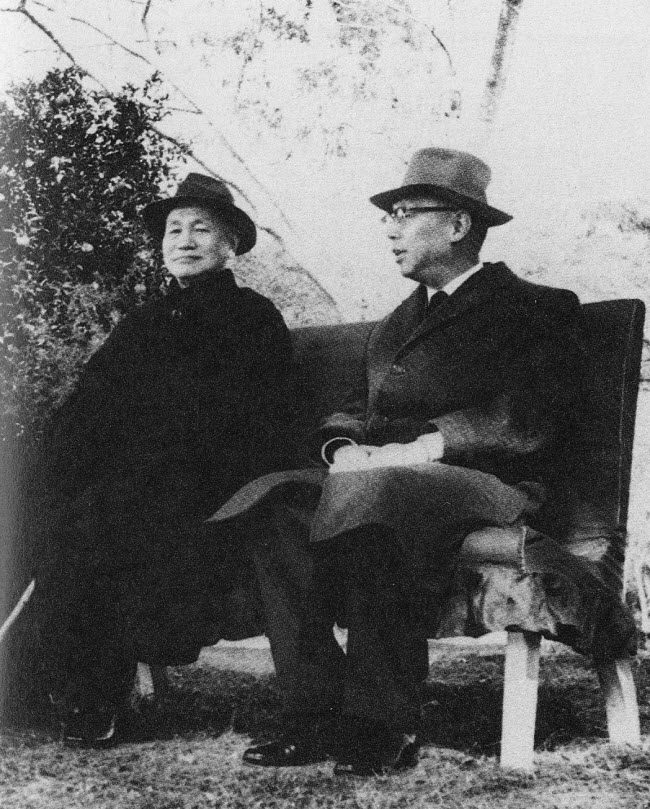
President Chiang Kai-shek and Vice President Yen Chia-kan

On 16 December 1963, Yen Chia-kan was appointed Premier of the Republic of China by President of the Republic of China, Chiang Kai-shek. After the death of Vice President Chen Cheng on 5 March 1965, the incumbent President of the Republic of China, Chiang Kai-shek, selected Yen Chia-kan as his running mate in the upcoming election.

In 1966, the National Assembly elected Yen Chia-kan as Vice President of the Republic of China with a narrow majority of 55.23 percent of the votes, while Chiang Kai-shek was elected with 98.60 percent of the votes. In 1972, Yen Chia-kan was re-elected vice president with 83.78 percent of the votes. As vice president, Yen Chia-kan served as the most senior government official of the Republic of China to travel abroad, as Chiang Kai-shek had stated that he would not leave Taiwan until the Chinese Civil War was resolved by the reclaiming of the mainland.

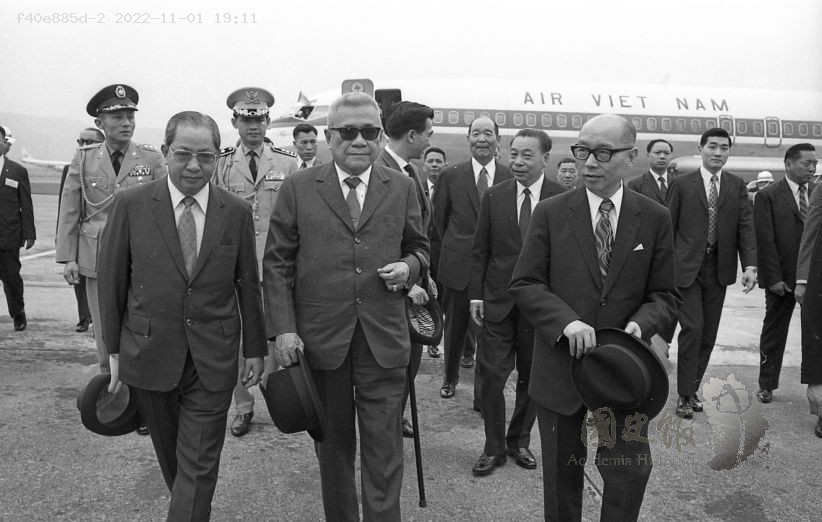
Vice President of the Republic of Vietnam Trần Văn Hương visits the Republic of China, 1972

From 6 May 1967 to 26 May 1967, Yen Chia-kan and his wife toured the United States, during which he met U.S. President Lyndon B. Johnson. In 1968, Yen Chia-kan visited Thailand. In 1971, Yen Chia-kan visited Saigon, the capital of the Republic of Vietnam, on behalf of the Republic of China to attend the inauguration of President Nguyễn Văn Thiệu. On March 3, 1972, he met with Taiwan independence movement activist Koo Kwang-ming, who secretly returned to Taiwan. In the same year, Yen Chia-kan received Vice President of the Republic of Vietnam Trần Văn Hương, who was visiting the Republic of China.

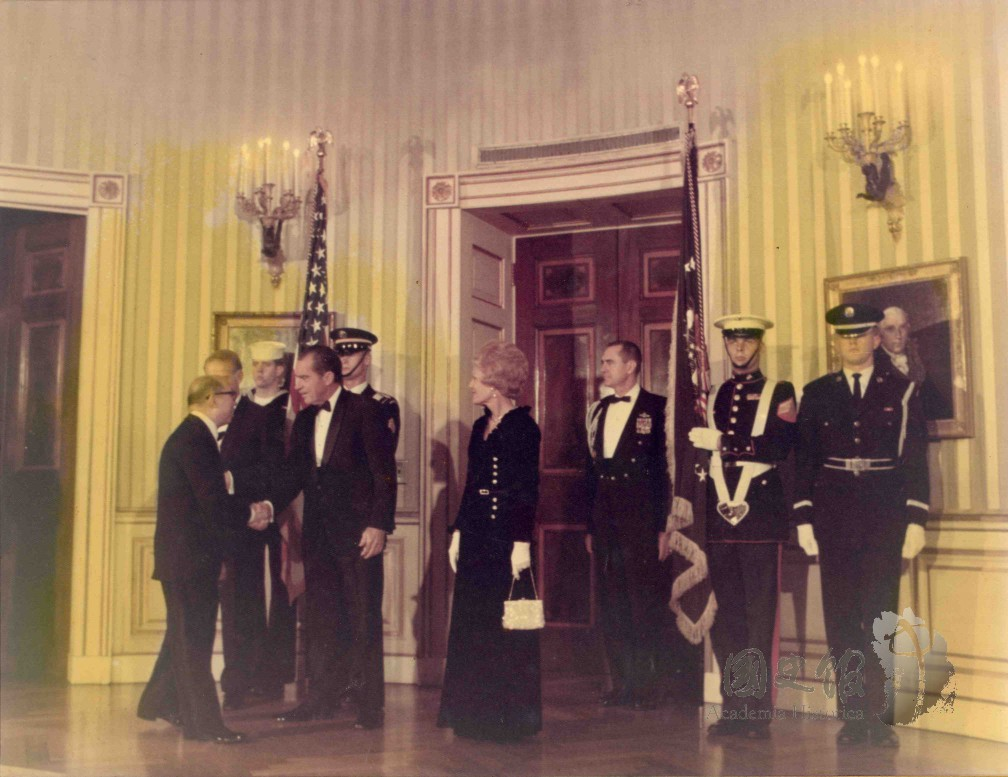
President Richard Nixon receives Vice President Yen Chia-kan at the White House, 1973

On the afternoon of 5 January 1973, Yen Chia-kan visited Washington, D.C., and met with U.S. President Richard Nixon. In 1974, Yen Chia-kan received the South Korean journalist Chung Mu Son, who visited Taiwan to find historical materials and documents related to Kim Ku, who was a Korean independence movement activist. In December of the same year, Yen Chia-kan traveled throughout Central America and the Caribbean, during which he attended the inauguration of Anastasio Somoza Debayle, who was starting his second term as President of Nicaragua.

During Yen Chia-kan’s premiership and vice-presidency, Taiwan was already on the path of rapid economic growth and industrialization. Taiwan’s industrial production nearly tripled in the years from 1966 to 1972. Taiwan’s agricultural output also increased by nearly 30 percent. By 1971, Taiwan’s average annual economic growth reached 11.4 percent. In the October of the same year, inflation was reduced to 1 percent. Yen Chia-kan’s tenure as premier and vice president was marked by economic success and industrialization, which would continue during his subsequent presidency and the presidency of Chiang Ching-kuo.

== Presidency ==
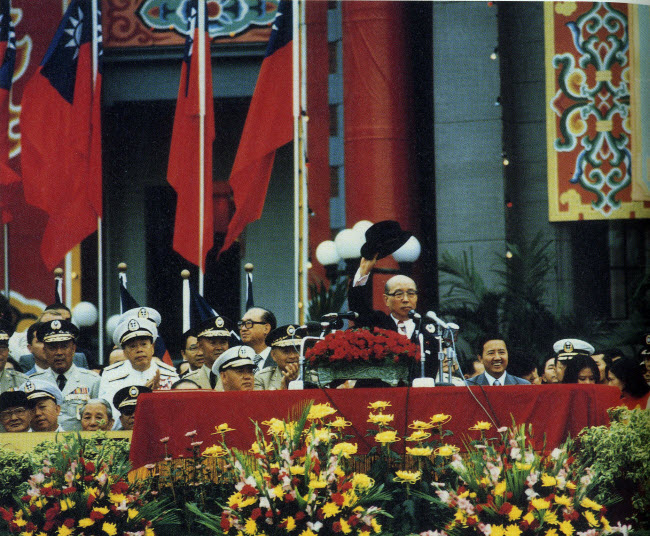
President Yen Chia-kan presiding over National Day of the Republic of China celebrations, 1977

On 5 April 1975, Chiang Kai-shek passed away in Taipei. In accordance with the Constitution of the Republic of China, Yen Chia-kan was sworn in as the second President of the Republic of China at 11:00 am on 6 April 1975. Yen Chia-kan’s assumption of the office of President of the Republic of China also made him the government’s chief mourner of the late president Chiang Kai-shek. He declared a month-long period of mourning for Chiang Kai-shek and retained the Vice President’s office as a sign of respect for the late president. On 17 April 1975, Yen Chia-kan met with more than 1,000 overseas Chinese representatives who arrived in Taipei to attend the funeral for Chiang Kai-shek.

As the first civilian President, Yen Chia-kan enacted numerous reforms, one of which was the shift from using Literary Chinese to the written vernacular in government documents.

Although the 1973 oil crisis began during Chiang Kai-shek’s presidency, the majority of Taiwan’s economic policies that responded to it were passed during Yen Chia-kan’s presidency. The 1973 oil crisis, which was triggered by the OAPEC petroleum embargo due to the Yom Kippur War, had severe negative impacts on Taiwan’s economy as the Republic of China lacked domestic fossil fuel reserves. Taiwan’s inflation rate peaked in March 1974, when it reached 61.5 percent. Yen Chia-kan implemented austerity policies and directed the Central Bank of the Republic of China to raise interest rates and restrict credit to reduce the money supply and thus limit imported inflation. By October 1976, Yen Chia-kan’s policies reduced Taiwan’s inflation rate to 0.13 percent.

Despite initial shock from the 1973 oil crisis, Yen Chia-kan was still able to implement policies that would allow Taiwan to rapidly industrialize and expand its economy. He continued Chiang Kai-shek’s Ten Major Construction Projects, which was primarily managed by Chiang Ching-kuo supported Taiwan’s rapid industrialization. Beginning in June 1975, the Republic of China started drafting the "Chang An Plan” (長安計畫), which was to design, manufacture, and test defensive missiles.

On 9 July 1977, Yen Chia-kan visited Saudi Arabia, becoming the first President of the Republic of China to visit another country after the government relocated to Taiwan. During his visit to Saudi Arabia, King Khalid came to greet him personally at the airport. Not only was Saudi Arabia an important economic partner, it was also one of the few significant countries to maintain official diplomatic relations with the Republic of China as its allies dropped from 68 to 31 between 1971 and 1973.

On 20 May 1978, Yen Chia-kan’s term as president elapsed and he did not seek reelection. On the same day, Chiang Kai-shek's son, Chairman of the Kuomintang and Premier Chiang Ching-kuo was elected third President of the Republic of China by the National Assembly.

== Post-presidency ==
After the end of his presidency, Yen Chia-kan was invited to serve as the chairman of the Chinese Cultural Renaissance movement, a position that he accepted. Yen Chia-kan was also appointed as an honorary member of the Director of the Management Committee of the National Palace Museum, a position that he resigned from in March 1990.

== Death ==
Yen Chia-kan had been bedridden since a brain hemorrhage in 1986. He suffered a second brain hemorrhage in 1992 and died at the Taipei Veterans General Hospital on 24 December 1993 the age of 88. He was buried at the Wuchih Mountain Military Cemetery in New Taipei City.

== See also ==
- History of the Republic of China
- Politics of the Republic of China
- President of the Republic of China
- Bank of Taiwan
- Kuomintang
- Chiang Kai-shek
- Chiang Ching-kuo
- Lee Teng-hui

== Notes ==
Political offices
Preceded by Liu Hang-chen	Economic Affairs Minister of the Republic of China; 1950	Succeeded by Cheng Tao-ju
Preceded by Kuan Chi-yu	Finance Minister of the Republic of China; 1950–1954	Succeeded by P. Y. Shu
Preceded by position established	Minister of Vocational Assistance Commission for Retired Servicemen of the Republic of China; 1954–1956	Succeeded by Chiang Ching-kuo
Preceded by Yu Horng-jiun	Governor of Taiwan Province; 1954–1957	Succeeded by Chow Chih-jou
Preceded by P. Y. Shu	Finance Minister of the Republic of China; 1958–1963	Succeeded by Chen Ching-yu
Preceded by Chen Cheng	Premier of the Republic of China; 1963–1972	Succeeded by Chiang Ching-kuo
Preceded by Chen Cheng	Vice President of the Republic of China; 1966–1975	Succeeded by Hsieh Tung-ming
Preceded by Chiang Kai-shek	President of the Republic of China; April 5, 1975–May 20, 1978	Succeeded by Chiang Ching-kuo
