= Standard of living in Japan =

Living conditions in Japan

The standard of living in Japan refers to the material conditions, income, consumption, housing, health, work, public services, and other factors that shape everyday life in Japan. Japan is regarded as a high-income developed country with long life expectancy, low crime, extensive public transport, and broad access to consumer goods and services. At the same time, its living standards have been affected by high housing costs in major cities, stagnant wages, an ageing population, regional disparities, and relatively high living costs for some goods and services.

The post-war era witnessed a big rise in living standards, which was characterized by the increased diffusion of various consumer durables. In February 1969, for instance, it was estimated that 84.6% of households in Japan had a sewing machine while 37.2% had a knitting machine, 94.7% a black and white television, 13.9% a colour television, 27.3% a stereo record player, 28.6% a tape recorder, 62.7% a camera, 88.3% a washing machine, 62.6% a vacuum cleaner, 84.6% a refrigerator, 80.1% an electric fan, 4.9% an air conditioner, 18% an organ, 6.1% a piano, 17.3% a passenger car, 9.8% a van, and 6.9% a small truck.

== Housing ==
Even though the percentage of residences with flush toilets jumped from 31.4% in 1973 to 65.8% in 2008, this figure was still far lower than in other industrialized states. In some primarily rural areas of Japan, it was still under 30% at that time. Even 9.7% of homes built between 1986 and 1988 did not have flush toilets.

In the metropolitan areas, houses are built extremely close to each other, with narrow straps of green doubling for a garden, if any. Apartment buildings with ten to twenty floors can be found even in suburbs. While lacking space, these houses offer all other amenities.

The cost of Japanese housing differs a lot between urban and rural areas. The asset price bubble of the 1980s inflated land prices in the metropolitan areas, but have stabilized since the early 1990s at about 50% of the peak. In the cities, housing is still expensive relative to annual income, even though the high cost is somewhat offset by low interest rates. Large companies often offer subsidies to their employees to pay for housing.

== Food ==
The Westernization of many areas of Japanese life includes consuming a diversity of foods. After World War II, Japanese dietary patterns changed and came to resemble those of the West. Many Japanese still prefer a traditional breakfast of boiled rice, miso soup, and pickled vegetables (tsukemono).

Average intake per day was 2,084 calories and 77.9 grams of protein in the late 1980s. Of total protein intake, 26.5% came from cereals (including 18.4% from rice), 9.6% from pulses, 23.1% from fish, 14.8% from livestock products, 11% from eggs and milk, and 15% from other sources. The government inaugurated several policies to switch to non-rice crops, but they were met with limited success and rice remained in oversupply (see agriculture, forestry, and fishing in Japan). As a downside, the percentage of the childhood population which are overweight has increased.

== Savings ==
Typically, Japanese consumers have been savers as well as buyers, partly because of habit. However, by 1980, the consumer credit industry began to flourish. Younger families are particularly prone to take on debt. Housing is the largest single item for which consumers contracted loans. In 1989, families annually borrowed an estimated US$17,000 or about 23% of their average savings. Those who wished to buy houses and real estate needed an average US$242,600 (of which they borrowed about US$129,000).

But many families in the 1980s were giving up the idea of ever buying a house. This led many young Japanese to spend part of their savings on trips abroad and not buy houses, expensive consumer items, and other luxuries. As one young worker put it, "If I can never buy a house, at least I can use my money to enjoy life now". As credit card and finance agency facilities expanded, the use of credit to procure other consumer durables was spreading. By 1989, the number of credit cards issued in Japan reached virtual parity with the population.

Japanese families still feel that saving for retirement is critical because of the relative inadequacy of official social security and private pension plans. The average family in 1989 had US$76,500 in savings, a figure far less than what is needed to cover the living expenses for retired individuals, although official pensions and retirement allowances did help cover the financial burdens of senior citizens. The annual living expenses for retired individuals in 1989 were estimated at US$22,800. About half of this was from government pensions and the rest from savings and retirement allowances. Senior citizens in their seventies had the largest savings, including deposits, insurance, and negotiable securities worth an estimated US$113,000 per person. In 1989, individuals in their twenties had savings amounting to US$23,800 and salaried workers in their thirties had US$66,000 in savings.

== Consumer products ==
The Japanese consumer benefits most from the availability of compact, sophisticated consumer products that are often popular exports. Consumer electronics, clothing, automobiles, and household appliances are high-quality items that Japanese industry provided in quantity. There are 45 million cars in Japan, for a ratio of 350 cars per 1000 people. The Japanese rail system was ranked the world's most advanced in a recent OECD development report.

== Ownership of consumer durables by percentage of households ==
Source: Economic Planning Agency, Economic Manual, 1986

Consumer durable	1970	1975	1980	1985
Color TVs	55.6%	90.3%	98.2%	99.1%
Stereos	31.2%	52.1%	57.1%	59.9%
VTRs	33.7%	32.7	2.4%	27.8%
Cars	22.1%	41.2%	57.2%	67.4%
Refrigerators	89.1%	96.7%	99.1%	98.4%
Air conditioners	5.9%	17.2%	39.2%	52.3%
Radio cassette players	30.8%	51.6%	61.9%	73.6%
Pianos	6.8%	11.8%	15.8%	18.3%

== Comparison ==
A Japanese social scientist ranked Japan among a group of ten other industrialized nations, according to a list of variables. Data was from the mid-1970s to the late 1980s and Japan was rated better than average in terms of overall income distribution, per capita disposable income, traffic safety and crime, life expectancy and infant mortality, proportion of owner- occupied homes, work stoppages and labor unrest, worker absenteeism, and air pollution. Japan was below average for wage differentials by gender and firm size, labor's share of total manufacturing income, social security and unemployment benefits, weekly workdays and daily work hours, overall price of land and housing, river pollution, sewage facilities, and recreational park areas in urban centers. Some of these variables, especially pollution and increased leisure time, improved in the 1980s, and, in general, living standards in Japan were comparable to those of the world's wealthiest economies.

== Growing inequality ==
Over the past two decades or so, inequality in Japan has grown as a result of economic difficulties that Japan has faced since the end of the economic boom of the 1980s. This problem has been characterised by a rise in the percentage of the workforce employed on a temporary or part-time basis, from 19% in 1996 to 34.5% in 2009, together with an increase in the number of Japanese living in poverty. According to the Organisation for Economic Co-operation and Development, the percentage of people in Japan living in relative poverty (defined as an income that is less than 50% of the median) rose from 12% of the total population in the mid-Eighties to 15.3% in 2000. In 2005, it was estimated that 12.2% of children in Japan lived in poverty. From 1985 to 2008, the percentage of non-regular workers (those working on fixed-term contracts without job security, seniority wage increases, or other benefits) rose from 16.4% to 34.1% of the workforce. Various observers have come to describe Japan as a “disparity society”, a socially divided society with stark class differences and inequalities (in a country where around 90% of the population have regarded themselves to be middle-class in various surveys). The rise in income inequality in Japan arguably contributed to the election of the Democratic Party of Japan in 2009, which promised to reduce socio-economic inequalities through policies such as an expanded welfare system. Despite these problems, the average standard of living in Japan remains amongst the highest in the world.

== See also ==
- Economy of Japan
- Standard of living in Taiwan
