= Yang Chi-tseng =

Chinese and Taiwanese politician and engineer (1898-1993)

Yang Chi-tseng (Chinese: 楊繼曾; 7 November 1898 – 7 March 1993) was a Chinese and Taiwanese politician and engineer. Born into a Mongol-descended bureaucratic family in Zhejiang Province, Yang graduated from the Technische Universität Berlin in 1926. He subsequently held technical posts at the provincial arsenals of three provinces, the Shanghai Arsenal, and the Hanyang Arsenal. During the Second Sino–Japanese War, he oversaw the consolidation of Shanghai’s steel plants and their relocation to the Chinese wartime interior.

After the Republic of China government retreated to Taiwan, Yang, under the authorization of Premier Chen Cheng, assumed joint responsibility for economic and financial affairs alongside Yin Chung-jung and Yen Chia-kan. The trio became widely known as the “Yin–Yen–Yang iron triangle” of finance and economics. Chen is reported to have told them: “I am a soldier by training and have had no prior experience in economics. Even after serving over four years as Premier, the rapid changes in the economy are beyond my grasp. From now on, any proposals and recommendations jointly put forward by the three of you will receive my full support.”

Yang served as Minister of Economic Affairs from 1955 to 1965, Ambassador of the Republic of China to Liberia from 1965 to 1969, and Permanent Representative of the Republic of China to the International Atomic Energy Agency from 1969 to 1971.

Yang was also the founding president of Taiwan's first Lions Club International chapter.
