= K. Y. Yin =

Taiwanese government official

Yin Kuo-yung
- 尹仲容
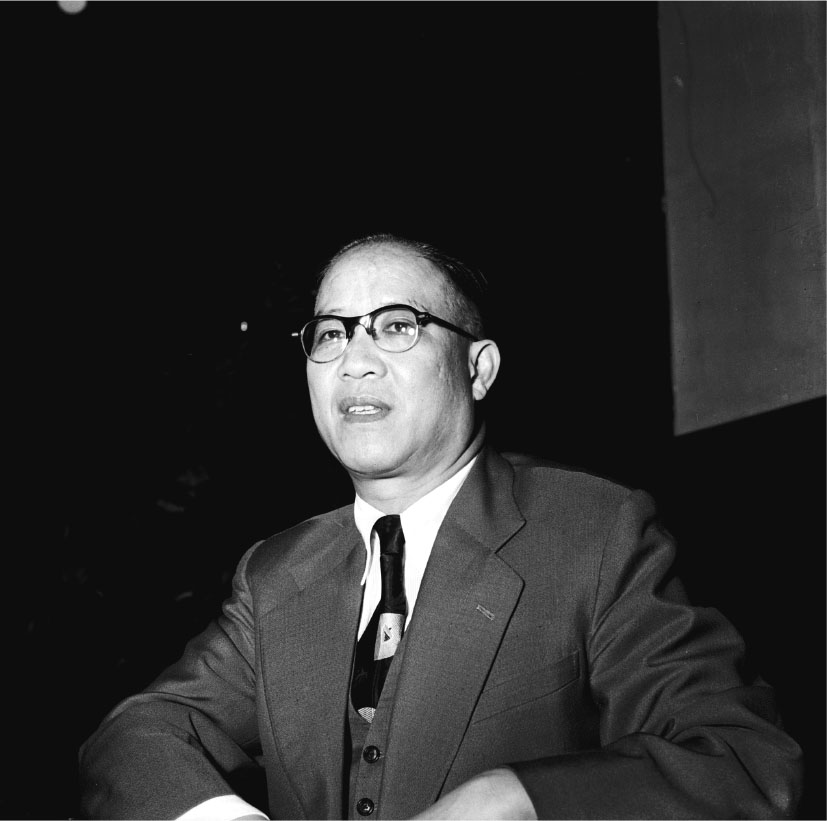
- Yin in 1954

Minister of Economic Affairs
- In office 1 June 1954 – 1 December 1955
- President: Chiang Kai-shek
- Preceded by: T. K. Chang
- Succeeded by: Kiang Piao

Chairman of Bank of Taiwan
- In office July 1960 – 24 January 1963

Personal details
- Born: Yin Kuo-yung; 16 April 1903 Nanchang, China
- Died: 24 January 1963 (aged 59) Taipei, Taiwan
- Citizenship: Republic of China
- Party: Kuomintang

K. Y. Yin
- Chinese: 尹仲容
Transcriptions
Standard Mandarin
- Hanyu Pinyin: Yǐn Zhòngróng
- Bopomofo: ㄧㄣˇㄓㄨㄥˋㄖㄨㄥˊ
- Wade–Giles: Yin3 Ch‘ung4-jung2
- IPA: [ìn.ʈʂʊ̂ŋ.ɻʊ̌ŋ]

Yin Kuo-yung (Chinese: 尹國墉; pinyin: Yǐn Guóyōng; Wade–Giles: Yin^{3} Kuo^{2}-yung^{1}; 16 April 1903 – 24 January 1963), (Note: Chinese: 尹國墉) later and more widely known in the Sinophone world as Yin Chung-jung (Chinese: 尹仲容; pinyin: Yǐn Zhòngróng; Wade–Giles: Yin^{3} Chung^{4}-jung^{2}) (Note: Chinese: 尹仲容; pinyin: Yǐn Zhòngróng; Wade–Giles: Yin^{3} Ch‘ung^{4}-jung^{2}) was the former Minister of Economic Affairs of the Republic of China (Taiwan). Acclaimed as the "Father of Taiwan's Industry", he was one of few contemporary government officials that consistently promoted free trade, and is widely viewed as the main architect of Taiwan's economic policy in the 1950s that stabilised the economy.

== Early career ==
Yin's ancestral home was Shaoyang of Hunan, China. (Note: Taiyi Township, Tuanshan Town, Shaodong) His grandfather Yin Xilun was a scholar in the late Qing dynasty. Yin studied electrical machinery in Shanghai Nanyang University. After his graduation in 1925, he was directly employed by the Ministry of Transport for his outstanding performance at the university. A friend of financier T. V. Soong, Yin then worked in a private company funded by the Soong family, and later under Soong, responsible for coal mine and power generation, as Soong became a cabinet minister and chairman of Guangdong government.

== In government ==
In 1949, Yin was invited to join the cabinet of the Republic of China, in charge of the Central Trust of China and the Taiwan Area Production Management Committee as the vice-chairman of the committee, responsible for industrial regeneration and external procurement. He also helped to transfer funds from Shanghai to Taiwan during the Chinese Civil War, and maintained liaisons between Shanghai and Taiwan. A year after the government retreated to Taiwan, in 1951, Yin organised the allocation of the funds from the United States as Washington began providing the Republic of China with an annual financial aid of US$100 million.

Yin assumed a leading role in overseeing finance and trade alongside other key economic officials, when he and Yen Chia-kan and Yang Chi-tseng became widely known as the “Yin–Yen–Yang iron triangle” of finance and economics. The trio was trusted by the then-Premier Chen Cheng, who reportedly said to them that "any proposals and recommendations jointly put forward by the three of you will receive my full support".

During the 1950s, while the government continued to endorse state-led industrial planning and socialist-oriented economic policies, Yin and like-minded technocrats advocated for developing the private sector which could moderate the strictly state-centered planning.

== Minister of Economic Affairs (1954–55) ==
Although not a member of the ruling Kuomintang, Yin was appointed Minister of Economic Affairs and Director of the Central Trust by Chen shortly before he stood down as Premier in June 1954. Yin, with his experience in Shanghai's private sector and market, staunchly promoted "planned market economy", as he moved forward import substitution industrialization and export-oriented policies. Under his policy, Taiwan imported foreign cotton instead of Japanese fabrics, through which fostered the development of the domestic textile industry and enabled many enterprises to gain a steady foothold in the market. His reform of foreign exchange was later known as Taiwan's "first round of economic liberalization", which quickly grew Taiwan's plastics and glass industries. He also privatised various state-owned industries including cement, paper, agriculture, forestry and mining in order to grow the market economy.

=== Indictment and resignation ===
Yangtse Timber Company, a local venture, closed down in 1955 due to poor management. It was then revealed by a legislator that the company received a large sum of loan from Central Trust. Since Yin was both the Minister of Economic Affairs and the Director of the Central Trust, he was prosecuted in July, becoming the first cabinet minister to face a trial. Although he was acquitted by the court in October. Yin announced his resignation as the minister and the director to take up the political responsibility.

== Bank of Taiwan (1960–63) ==
Yin returned to the government as the secretary-general of the Economic Stabilization Board in 1957, and additionally as vice-chairman of the Council for United States Aid in 1958. He continued to assist the private sector with tariff protection and factory restriction, while keeping a close eye on the use of the US aid.

In 1960, Yin took up the chairmanship of the Bank of Taiwan, during which he encouraged savings, stabilized prices, and granted loans to SMEs. The bank maintained low interest rate, allowing the flow of funds to the market from savings. In early 1961, the Bank of Taiwan's proposal to print new hundred-NTD bills faced backlash from the public, due to concerns of possible vicious inflation alike 1947's printing of Chinese gold yuan and Old Taiwan dollar. Yin insisted on the plan and, under close surveillance by the bank, there was no vicious inflation.

== Death ==
Yin died of liver cancer in Taipei on 24 January 1963, at the age of 59, possibly related to his overwork. He was survived by his mother, who died nine months after her son's at the age of 91, his wife and his brother.

Despite being one of the top-ranking officials, Yin lived on very few savings and his family was said to have been supported by others. His saving was also not sufficient to cover his funeral.

== Legacy ==
Yin's early years in the Shanghai business sector instilled his belief in advancing market economy and the importance of free trade for economic growth. This policy was abandoned as soon as he left office, and was seen as to have indirectly caused the bubble economy in the late 1980s by the excessively high foreign exchange deposits. He was also questioned for supporting tycoons under the initiatives.

President Chiang Kai-shek honoured Yin in a statement for his comprehensive planning in industrial development and foreign trading that opened a new chapter for Taiwan's economy and resurgence. Ramon H. Myers, a Hoover Institution scholar, said Yin "was probably the most brilliant technocrat-official of the 1950s. He was largely responsible for persuading key government officials to reform the foreign exchange system in order to orientate Taiwan's economy to the world market." Ezra F. Vogel said Yin and Li Kwoh-ting, who was mentored by Yin and one of the architects of Taiwan Miracle, are the "two great leaders of economic modernization" in Taiwan.

Yin possessed solid knowledge in Chinese literature and culture, authoring the chronicle of China's first diplomat Guo Songtao and the annotations to the Lüshi Chunqiu.

== See also ==
- Sun Yun-suan
- Wu Tingju
