= Li Kwoh-ting =

Taiwanese economist and politician (1910–2001)

- 李國鼎
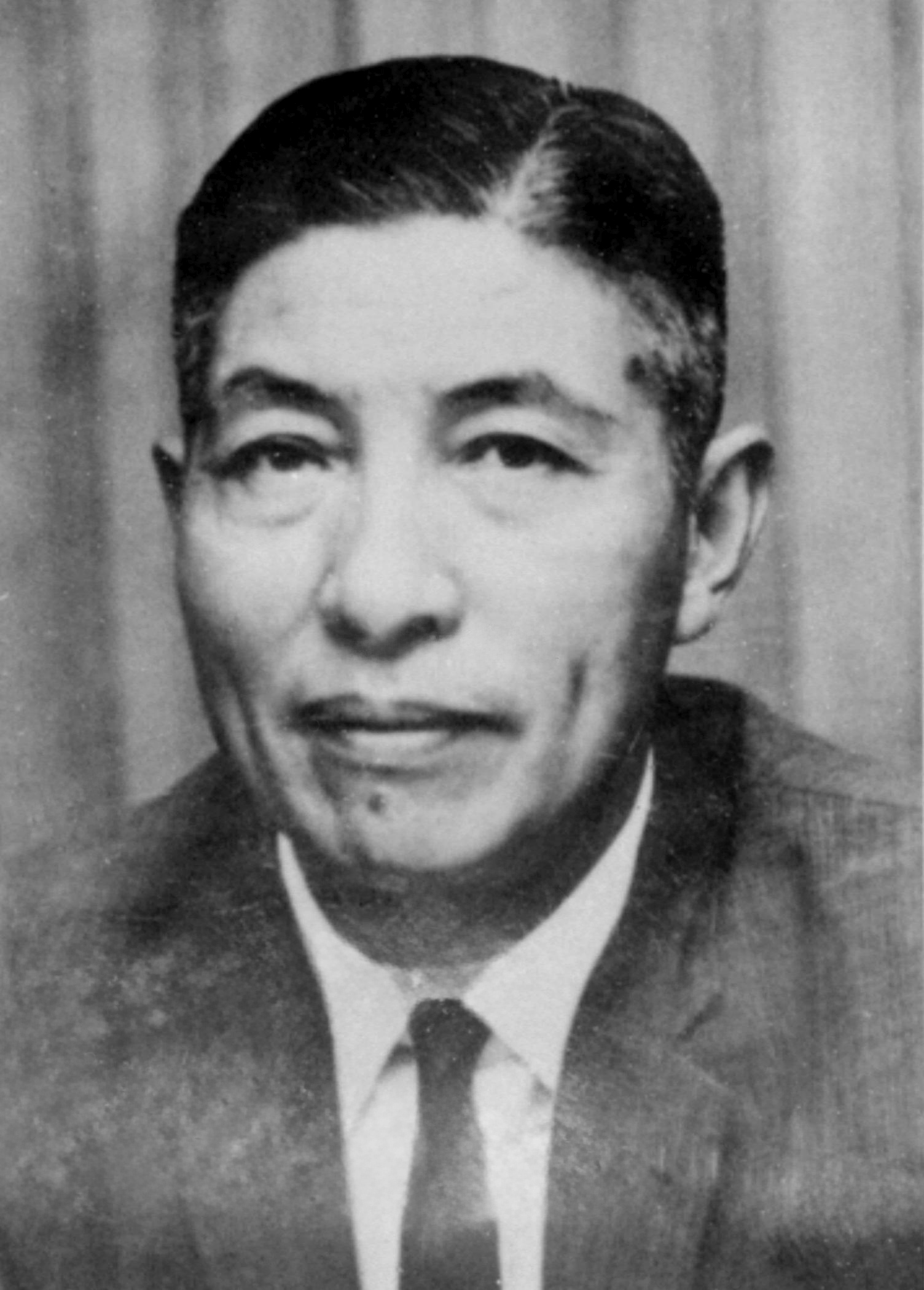

Member of the Executive Yuan
- In office June 1, 1976 – July 22, 1988

11th Minister of Finance
- In office July 4, 1969 – June 11, 1976
- Preceded by: Yu Kuo-hwa
- Succeeded by: Fei Hua

Minister of Economic Affairs
- In office January 25, 1965 – July 4, 1969
- Succeeded by: Tao Shengyang (陶聲洋)

Personal details
- Born: January 28, 1910 Nanjing, China
- Died: May 31, 2001 (aged 91) Taipei, Taiwan
- Party: Kuomintang
- Education: National Central University (BS); University of Cambridge (unfinished PhD)

Li Kwoh-ting (traditional Chinese: 李國鼎; simplified Chinese: 李国鼎; pinyin: Lǐ Guódǐng; 28 January 1910 – 31 May 2001) was a Chinese economist and politician best known as the "Father of Taiwan's Economic Miracle" and referred to by the New York Times as the "Godfather of Technology" in Taiwan for his work in transforming Taiwan's economy from an agrarian-based system into one of the world's leading producers of information and telecommunications technology. His career spanned some 40 years, working for the Kuomintang government both before and after its defeat and subsequent retreat to Taiwan. His contributions continue to make him one of the most revered figures in Taiwanese history to this day.

== Early life and education ==
Li was born in Nanjing on January 28, 1910, to a family from Wuyuan County, Jiangxi.

Li excelled in mathematics and physics at a young age. At 16 years old, he enrolled at National Central University to study mathematics and physics. After graduating with his Bachelor of Science (B.S.) in physics in 1930, he received a scholarship to pursue doctoral studies in England at the University of Cambridge. He left China for England in 1934 and studied superconductivity at the Cavendish Laboratory under professor Ernest Rutherford. He was a member of Emmanuel College, Cambridge.

== Career ==
Li withdrew from Cambridge and returned to China to support the Chinese war effort when Japan invaded China in 1937. He later fled to Taiwan in July 1948 with the Nationalist Party when the Chinese Communist Party took over China. He became the president of the China Shipbuilding Corporation in Taiwan in 1951 and was appointed as a member of the Industrial Development Commission responsible for the planning and economic development of Taiwan in 1953. In 1959 he became the head of the Industrial Development and Investment Center under the Council for United States Aid.

He held a number of leadership positions in industry and government in Taiwan, including that of economic minister from 1965 to 1969 and finance minister from 1969 to 1976. After 1976 he was appointed "Minister without portfolio" and promoted science and technology in Taiwan. In 1968, he received the Ramon Magsaysay Award for government service. He created a policy that helped attract entrepreneurs in the tech industry and helped fund Taiwan's electronics companies, which led to Taiwan's primacy as a producer of computer parts. Li had a very important role in the creation of TSMC, the world's largest chipmaker in 2023. He also helped build the Hsinchu Science Park, which later became known as Taiwan's Silicon Valley. The park is one of the world's leading centers for semiconductor manufacturing and industrial and computer technology development. As of 2018 more than 500 high-tech companies reside in the park. Li was also a senior adviser to the President of the Republic of China, Chen Shui-bian.

== Economic policy ==
In total, Li was a government official for 40 years, 10 of which he spent in mainland China before the Chinese Communist Party won the civil war. Tony Fu-Lai Yu speculates that the time Li spent in China, as well as his science-based university education, greatly influenced his policy-making in Taiwan. Li had no formal training in economics, thus most of his knowledge of economic management was gained from practical experience and working with other economists. Consequently, Yu argues his policy was insulated from popular economic ideology and instead was driven by pragmatism. Li himself also claims that the purpose of his writings is to reveal his policy-making experiences for the future reference of other developing countries, and did not engage in writing about economic, administrative, or political science theory.

Yu argues that Li's policy-making can be explained by evolutionary economics. Two Yale economists, Gustav Ranis and John C.H. Fei, wrote the introductory essays to Li's 1995 book The Evolution of Policy Behind Taiwan's Development Success. Therefore, it can be interpreted that Ranis and Fei's views on economic policy are representative of Li's.

Ranis mainly writes on neo-classical growth theory, which claims that a steady economic growth rate can be achieved by correctly balancing the driving forces of labor, capital, and technology. He also writes on the concept of agricultural labor surplus economies which, in freeing up workers and generating agricultural surplus and leading to increased productivity in expanding commercial sectors.

Fei argues that two main types of forces govern policy evolution: objective and subjective. Objective forces are predetermined conditions, encompassing physical environments, external economic conditions, etc. Subjective forces include personal beliefs, economic knowledge, memories, experiences, and "common sense". Fei believes that political beliefs and ideology are the strongest factors in shaping economic policy-making, and thus is an ongoing process. In following with the concept of evolutionary economics, Fei believes that economic policy must change to suit new and ever-changing situations. Therefore, policy should not be static when created and instead evolve and be improved on to adapt to new situations. Li himself claims that the liberalization of the Taiwanese economy was a gradual process rather than an abrupt one following the international popularity of free market thought in the 1960s and 1970s.

=== Pragmatic economics ===
Li argues that there are two types of issues central to analyzing policy evolution. First is the economic impact of a policy, second is causation, or why a certain policy appears and is implemented at a certain time.

Li believes pragmatism should supersede ideology in terms of policy-making:

[Policy innovation should be based on] the anticipation of impending problems and conflicts, rather than be purely ideologically motivated . . . The very notion of an evolution of policy suggests that the timing (or timely appearance) of a particular policy is important, and a good policy innovation is one that does not arrive prematurely. Ideological considerations often get in the way of appropriate timing as, for example, with so-called welfare state legislation that the economy simply cannot support. What can almost be called a rejection of ideology lies at the heart of a healthy pragmatism that has guided policymakers in Taiwan and has supported a social consensus for growth and economic liberalization.

He argues against ideology-based policy making because it often interferes with the timing of certain policies, and all too often change too quickly. He believes such policy is "motivated by goals considered larger than people's actual well-being," which is a scathing review of ideology-based policy. Rather than ideology, Li believes the economic environment in which policies are made is more important and that policy should not be restricted by the ulterior motives of ideology-based economics.

=== Policy revision ===
Li's trial and error policy making was made possible by Taiwan's flexible government policy. Li says that it made it possible to abandon or modify ineffective programs and easily create and implement new ones in reaction to new situations.

Li's policies were often influenced by his experiences as part of the Kuomintang in mainland China. Hyperinflation was one of the major reasons that Chiang Kai-shek lost mainland China to the Communist Party, and thus Li abhorred all inflationary finance during his management of Taiwan's economy.

His aversion to relying on inflation is apparent in his claim:

Taiwan's experience shows that fiscal reforms (tax legislation) and monetary reforms (moving toward central bank autonomy) are major evolutionary steps taken by a responsible government ... What underlies both reforms is a rejection of the insanity of relying on the printing press to create purchasing power for the government to use in an effort to solve socioeconomic problems.

Li indicates that this was the main difference between Taiwan's policy and those in Latin American countries, and that this method of managing the economy led to an overall more responsible government and transparent taxation system. Li claims that during the 1950s–70s, the liberalization of Taiwan's economy was an unintended effect of their new policy, and it wasn't until 1983 that such "externally-oriented growth" was seen as beneficial and the merging of international competition in the domestic market was encouraged. Furthermore, Li says that Taiwan's government was guided at the start with the principle that private property and a market environment which favored private businesses were to be encouraged. Li writes:

Other promotional measures taken by the government included improving the investment climate, simplifying administrative procedures ... providing necessary financing through banking institutions, and promoting investment and exports through tax relief and other incentives.

This was the framework for Li's Principle of People's Livelihood where the importance of protecting private property for the improvement of socioeconomic activities and establishing a free economy was only superseded by the need to expand state capital. Yu claims that this view falls under what Robert Wade calls the "guided market economy". Li argues that the main problem with other less developed countries (LDCs) was that:

The alleged failure of the market in some other LDCs may, in fact, be due precisely to the opposite reason: the failure of political intervention in the market. Although the market structure was far from perfect at the beginning of transition growth in the 1950s, the overall trend has been for a strengthening of the market mechanism—a depoliticizing of the market. Taiwan experience shows that reduced intervention can work.

Li argues that without the same willingness in developing countries to support a free market, Taiwan's economic miracles and history are useless to them.

=== Government's role ===
Li explains that Taiwan's economic development was initially set back by the "scarcity of natural resources, shortages of capital and foreign exchange, technological backwardness, and lack of entrepreneurial skills," however, through the government's direct involvement and encouragement, the infrastructure and incentives needed for private enterprises to flourish, including mitigation of risk, was created:

Among the major initiatives have been: the formulation of investment program and the provision of low-interest loans; the establishment of industrial zones, export-processing zones, and the science-based industrial park; Ten Major Development Projects, the Twelve New Development Projects and the Fourteen Key Projects in the 1970s and 1980s. The government also adopted various supplementary fiscal, financial, foreign-exchange, and trade-promotion measures to quicken the pace of industrialization.

Taiwan's government made certain to not compete with private enterprises unless absolutely necessary, and the most lucrative investment projects were left for private businesses to take. Many times the government would first conduct feasibility studies before offering low interest loans to private entrepreneurs. Other times the government acted as sole owner of a business before handing it over to private investors.

However, Li was a strong believer that it was important for the government to step back once the private sector became more established. Fiscal policy would then become more of a "stabilizing and equilibrating mechanism to counterbalance fluctuations in private economic behaviour. The evolution of fiscal policy in Taiwan has followed the same progression . . . with government intervention diminishing as the economy moved steadily in the direction of liberalization."

This leads to Li's argument that there are two main major roles played by the government in economic development:

1. Enforcement of competition: To promote competition in small developing countries, it is best to open up the economy and expose domestic enterprises to international competition. Li believes anti-trust laws are superfluous in open economies. In new industries, government protection should only be given in the initial period.
2. Identify the areas of production characterized by externality ("activities where the producers of the goods or services cannot easily charge those who benefit" – this is somewhat different from the common view of externality): Goods with external effect are not fixed and will mature with the economy. Thus, government operated sectors can become more privatized as the economy matures, although it is reasonably difficult to decide what the government should provide based on external economies, and therefore should remain an ongoing task.

=== Transferability ===
On the topic of Taiwan's economic success being transferable to other developing countries, Li believes that:

...While our policy experiences cannot be transferred to LDCs as a whole package, individual measures (such as EPZs and investment incentives) that I introduced have, from time to time, been adopted successfully by neighbouring countries [...] If an experience can be transferable at all, the key question concerns the circumstances under which the policy is instituted. If the circumstances are too different, it is not likely that the policy will lead to the same result. The question of a policy's result is an economic issue, but the way policy is formulated is a political issue. Good economics can be rejected by bad politics. Hence, whether or not Taiwan's policy experience can be transferred to other developing economies depends very much on whether their cultures can allow pragmatism to overcome ideology as well as on how strongly they are dedicated to political and economic freedom.

Although Taiwan experienced relative economic success over the course of its history along with the other Four Asian Tigers which employed similar economic policies as Taiwan, the lack of the same "miraculous" development in Latin American countries that employed the same principles brings into question whether Li's policies can be fully transferred and result in unequivocal success. Li also did not consider external factors that helped Taiwan's initial economic growth, such as the economic and military aid provided by the US government from 1949 to 1965, which helped to dampen inflation.

=== Economic achievement ===
Taiwan experienced GDP growth of 10.6% a year from 1965 to 1979 with no deterioration in income distribution, an improvement in literacy, a longer life expectancy than almost all other developing countries, increases in manufacturing earnings of 15% a year from 1960 to 1979, and unemployment at less than 2% since 1970. As of 1988, income per person was three to ten times higher than China. In 1953 Taiwan's per capita income was below the Mediterranean countries, and well below any Latin American country and Malaysia, whereas by 1982 Taiwan's per capita income had reached US$2500, much higher than Malaysia, Brazil, and Mexico, and on par with Portugal, Argentina, and Chile.

In 1973 manufacturing's share in NDP was 36%, high even by standards of industrialized countries. Exports consisted of over half of GDP and consist of 90% of industrial goods, including textiles, clothes, leather and wood products, radio, television, cassette recorders, electronic calculators, sewing machines, machine tools, semi-conductors, and computers. This was a stark change from 1955's exports, which were 90% agricultural, consisting of mainly sugar and rice.

Ian Little writes, "Government expenditure fell from 19.6% of GNP in 1963 to 16% in 1973, whereas [in 1979] revenue rose from 21% to 22.4%." According to Wade however, government expenditure as a share of GNP increased from 20% in 1963 to 23% in 1973 and to 27% in 1980–81. However, government revenue increased from 19.3% in 1963 to 25.8% in 1973.

=== Criticisms ===
Taiwan's three-year stimulus package in 1991 to boost the private sector was NT $40 billion (US$1.5 billion) and included loans to small and medium-sized business and NT $20 billion for high-tech enterprises. The package also released 30,000 hectares of government owned land to the private sector, offered a five-year tax holiday to high-tech industries, allowed more foreign workers in to supplement the labor shortage in construction and manufacturing, and allowed more semi-finished industrial goods to be imported from mainland China to be processed in Taiwan. The goal of the plan was to maintain the expansion of Taiwan's GDP and private investment from falling below their then annual levels of 6–7% and 10–15%.

Critics of the plan included those who worked in manufacturing companies, saying that, "The government's plans are so rough that at the industrial level we can't work with its programs." One such vice-president said that because large private-sector companies planned several years in advance, government policies that are vague and unpredictable can easily go awry. He adds that the amount of funding offered by the government "can't make a dent in what the private sector really needs."

Other critics included businessmen who claimed the plan would only benefit big corporations and not the 97% of manufacturing companies that were small and medium-sized. They argued that the Cabinet was not counteracting the larger obstacle to private sector growth: the Central Bank's anti-inflation policy with high interest rates and tight liquidity. A manager of a computer parts company said, "It's easier to raise money in China than here."

Furthermore, there has been considerable criticism on the viability of one "best practice" policy to which every developing country should adhere. Ha-Joon Chang argues that many already developed countries did not in fact reach their current development level through using the policies and institutions which they recommend, but in fact actively used "bad" trade and industrial policies, such as infant industry protection and export subsidies. Chang proposes that many of the institutions which are regarded as necessary for economic development are the effect and not the cause of economic development. Chang concludes by suggesting that policies be catered to developing countries depending on their stage of development and needs, rather than by using a blanket set of policies.

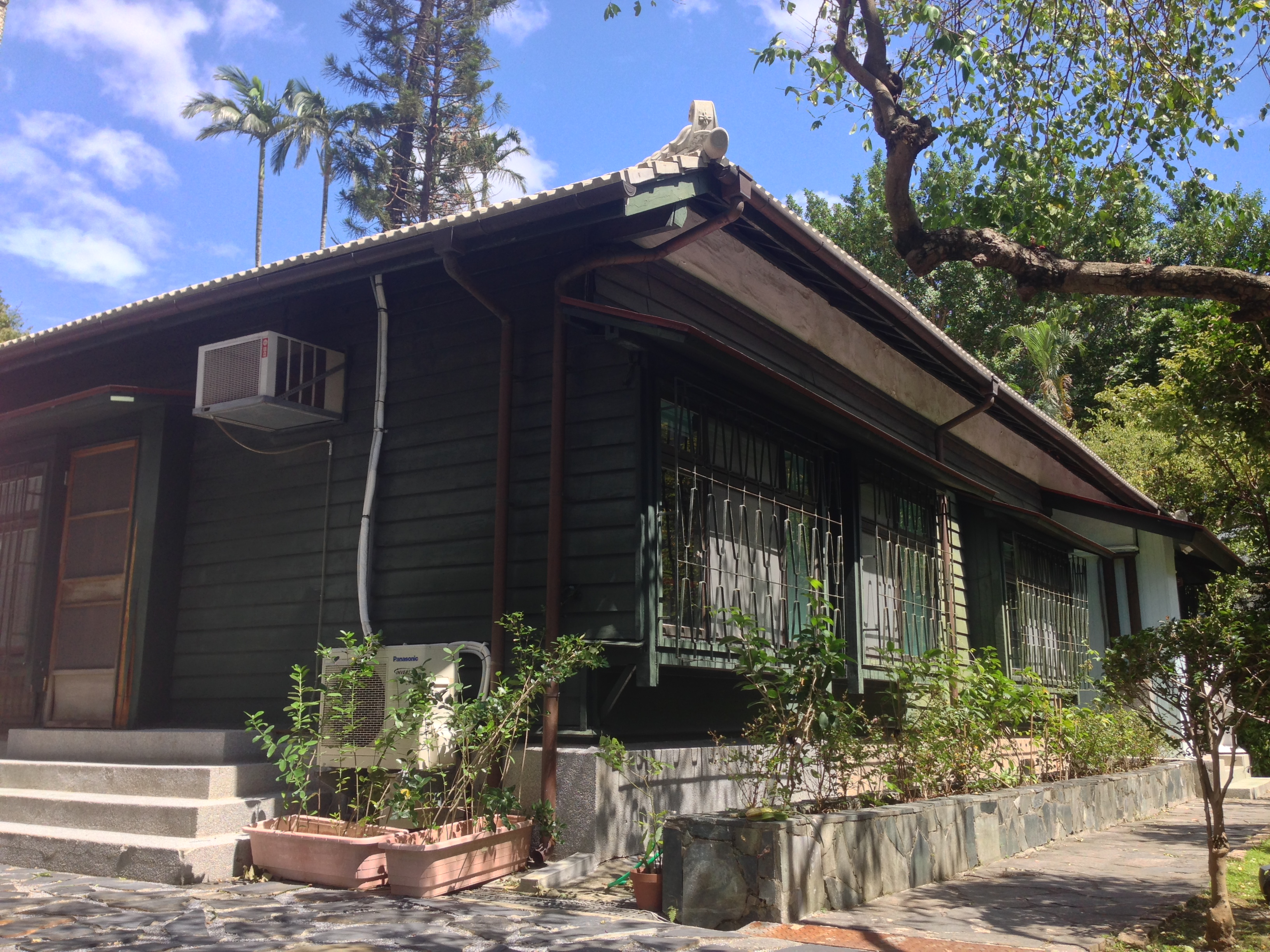
Li Kwoh-ting's Residence in Taipei, Taiwan

== Legacy ==
Li's residence in Taipei is now a museum. The traditional 1930s style Japanese house was Li's home from 1972 to 2001. Taipei's former mayor, Hau Lung-bin, recalls fondly, "I was so impressed by its furnishings [...] They showed how prudent he was, and he read plenty of books and periodicals." Additionally, to further honor Li, in 2011 an asteroid (239611 Likwohting) was named after him.

Four professorships at Stanford University are also named for Dr. Li in the fields of economic development, engineering, medicine and Chinese culture. As of 2014, the holders in each field are: economic development (Xueguang Zhou), engineering (Yinyu Ye), medicine (Stanley N. Cohen) and Chinese culture (Mark Edward Lewis).

== See also ==
- List of Ramon Magsaysay Award winners
- Yin Chung-jung

Government offices
Preceded by Yu Kuo-hwa	ROC Finance Minister; 1969–1976	Succeeded by Fei Hua
Preceded by Yang Gi-tzeng	ROC Minister of Economic Affairs; 1965–1969	Succeeded by Tao Sheng-yang
