= Jack C. K. Teng =

Chinese Minister and Olympic Committee Chairman

- 鄧傳楷
- Born: 7 September 1912; Jiangyin County, Jiangsu Province
- Died: 3 January 1999 (aged 86); Taipei, Taiwan
- Education: National Jinan University
- Occupations: Educator, writer, politician, diplomat and Olympic pioneer

Jack C.K. Teng (a.k.a. Teng Chuan-kai or Deng Chuankai; traditional Chinese: 鄧傳楷; simplified Chinese: 邓传楷; 7 September 1912 – 3 January 1999) was a Chinese educator, writer, politician, diplomat and Olympic pioneer. He is best known as the Chairman of the Chinese National Olympic Committee during the 1960 Summer Olympics, the first time a Chinese athlete won an Olympic medal.

== Biography ==
Teng was born on 7 September 1912 in Jiangyin County, Jiangsu Province, to a wealthy and dominant family. In 1933, he graduated from the National Jinan University (Bachelor of Law). Teng worked for the Ministry of Foreign Affairs of the Republic of China.

In 1934, Teng was sent to the United States as an assistant consulate. He also studied at the University of Washington, Seattle, and graduated BA in 1936. In 1936, he was transferred to the embassy of China in Panama.

In March 1949, Teng was appointed the President of National Yingshi University (a precursor of the current Zhejiang University). In 1949, Teng went to Taiwan. From March 1961 to 5 December 1969, he was the Vice-minister of the Ministry of Education (Republic of China). On 14 April 1977, he became the Minister of Personnel of the Examination Yuan.

From December 1957 to September 1962, Teng was the Chairman of the Chinese Olympic Committee.

Teng died on 3 January 1999 in Taipei, Taiwan.

== Scouting ==
Teng served as the International Commissioner of the Boy Scouts of China. In 1974, Chuan was awarded the 92nd Bronze Wolf, the only distinction of the World Organization of the Scout Movement, awarded by the World Scout Committee for exceptional services to world Scouting.

== Works ==
- Boy Scouts World Scout Leaders Meeting of the Far East Seventh President of speech Quantikuaiyi / 1970.New Zealand

In Chinese:

- 旅美見聞錄 1936.草就 1940.問世
- 現代國際問題 1942.
- 菲律賓社會中心教育的推行 1954.1.
- 本省教育今後的動向 1954.1.
- 本屆師範教育運動週勉辭 1954.4.
- 西班牙政治 1957.
- 西班牙之復興 1957.6.
- 土耳其中興紀實 1957.
- 亞洲教育首長會議代表團報告 1962.
- 歐行紀感 1964.8.19 歐洲
- 國際青年會議側記 1964.8.23-9.1 法國格蘭諾堡
- 人生道上 1965.8.8 於衣索比亞亞的斯亞貝巴
- 參加世界教師組織聯合會14届報告 1965.7.1
- 參加世界各國教育首長會議報告1965.9.8伊朗
- 參加國際童子軍教育廿届會議報告 1965.9.26
- 教育政策 1967.
- 中法教育基金委員會中國代表團工作報告 1967.
- 景印江陰縣誌 1968.1.朱佛定、鄧傳楷等纂著
- 空中教學之發展與展望8電視及衛星教學 1969.
- 中非農業技術合作的現況與前瞻 1971.
- 全國人事會報閉幕典禮講詞1978./79./81./83.
- 教育改革論文集 1980.
- 行政院人事行政局24次擴大人事會報講詞
- 行政院人事行政局25次擴大人事會報致詞 1980.7.於復興山莊No.5卷
- 中國人事行政學會成立卅週年慶祝大會暨第廿一次會員大會頌詞 1981.4.No.63卷
- 向中常會報告當前銓敘工作 1981.11.
- 童子軍生活教育的完美性 1981.12.27
- 有容乃大 1982.
- 中國童子軍創始70年紀念感言 1982.2.25
- 源遠流長 1983.2.1 於臺北市木柵溝子口
- 中國國民黨聯合孫總理紀念周報告當前銓敘業務概況 1983.3.7
- 懷念戴運軌先生的風範 1983.4.
- 文章華國 1983.5.臺北市木柵溝子口山邊
- 公務人員內升外舉之我見 1983.7.
- 童子軍教育與世界大同 1983.10.25
- 訪紐西蘭記趣 1984.8.
- 銓敘部工作報告 1984.
- 追懷盛德 1986.3.
- 經國先生睿智天縱 1988.1.
- 中華民國之教育 1988.
- 實施九年國民教育感言 1988.9.
- 承先啟後 1989.4.臺北市
- 居仁由義 1991.春月
- 棠棣之華
- 孔子學說與近代教育思想
- 徐庭瑤先生八秩大慶書文詩畫牋
