= Fiber modification =

Fibre modification is a research field in which researchers aim at developing and applying technologies to impart new properties to natural fibres such as those in paper, in order to increase their functionality. Research areas in this field include many different technologies, amongst which the chemical modifications of fibres are widely used. One important sector of application of the chemical modifications is the treatment of wood for giving it enhanced properties such as higher mechanical properties, water impermeability, less hygroscopicity, bacterial and fungal resistance. Transferring and adapting the technical knowledge on fibre modification available for the wood sector to the recycled paper sector is an innovative use of these chemical treatments which has been the subject of studies that have been carried out within an EU co-funded project called Fibre+.

The project Consortium included members representing Paper and Packaging European Associations (CEPI, FEFCO), and research institutes specialized in the wood and paper for packaging sector and paper and packaging companies. The focus of the project was on chemical modification of the paper made recycled fibres, investigating the possibility to transfer wood fibre modifications technique from the wood sector to paper and packaging sector. The aim was to enhance the properties of papers and of the packaging, as the recycling process causes the deterioration of fibres.

The chemical modification of recycled fibres aimed at the creation of a new generation of packaging papers characterized for being more recyclable, less hygroscopic, stiff and durable. The high recycling rate of papers in Europe (which is at the level of 72%) and the consequent importance that recycling has for the circular economy, were at the basis of this study. Paper products form part of an integrated carbon cycle based on the photosynthetic conversion of water, carbon dioxide, nutrients and solar energy into renewable wood-based biomass. Once consumed, paper may be recovered and used again either as a source of secondary fibres, to produce recycled paper or as bio-fuel. Fibre packages or corrugated containers made from corrugated board were the ones that were dealt with in the project, as they are considered as being the most prominent structural application of paper.

== Chemical modification attempts ==
Fibre modification with chemicals or enzymes had been investigated in the production of fibreboards. Fibre modification applying steam (steam-exploded wood) has been proved an efficient pre-treatment method in producing thermoplastic composites. Current theories for interfibre bonding during papermaking process are based on general recognition of the hydrogen bonding model. Consequently, all effort for boosting fibre strength is connected to mechanical beating of fibres in order to generate more flexible and fragmented fibres for increased bonding areas. As a consequence, significant drawbacks are obtained in terms of water retention ratio resulting in poor dewatering behaviour and high energy consumption. New mechanisms for interpretation and control of interfibre bonding are still upcoming. One way to overcome these drawbacks could be the molecular coating of cellulose fibres using polymers targeted on entropy controlled mixing of polymers and cellulose gel resulting in higher bonding forces. Theoretical results as well as experimental data on how application of polymeric layers (e.g. carboxymethyl cellulose) and enzymes on cellulose fibres can lead to sheets of high bonding strength without any mechanical beating have been already presented. However, these attempts were still far from any industrial implementation and their application would have been costly and would not solve the problem of raw material availability.

== Objective ==
Based on this state-of-the-art, the objective of the project was to modify and thus improve the characteristics of different types of recovered fibres used for the production of a variety of packaging grade papers used as linerboard and corrugating medium for corrugated board manufacturing in Europe. Information on the actual furnish characteristics and composition of packaging materials is expected to help European packaging industry to evaluate its sources of supply and to adopt suitable methods and processes to improve the available resources in an optimal manner. In the case of packaging, scientific technical knowledge of practical industrial relations between fibre characteristics, paper properties and corrugated board properties also is needed.

From wood fibre modification to paper technology chemical wood modification aims at altering the structure of the cell wall matrix. Wood properties are improved considerably by converting hydrophilic OH-groups into larger more hydrophobic groups. Also the physical fixation of modifying chemicals in the cell wall matrix can considerably change the wood properties. In addition to a hydrophobing effect, the treatments reduce the volume of cell wall nano-pores and thus decrease the incorporation of water molecules into the cell wall matrix. On a macroscopic scale, wood modification can change important properties of the wood including biological durability (resistance against fungi), dimensional stability, hardness and UV-stability.

Since paper is produced from wood fibres, it was possible to transfer some of the developments achieved in wood technology to paper technology. Several technologies (e.g. chemical modification, nano-scale celluloses, polyelectrolytes, functional polymers based on cellulose, hemicelluloses and starch) were researched and used by different research groups around Europe (e.g. PTS and University of Göttingen, Germany; Kungliga Tekniska högskolan (KTH), Sweden.) There is already well established knowledge on chemical fibre modification of recycled fibres. Adamopoulos and Mai (2011) modified recycled fibres with N-methylol compounds and glutaraldehyde with significant improvement on fibre characteristics and paper sheet performance. Laboratory sheets manufactured with a variety of chemically modified recycled fibres were found to be superior in stiffness and hygroscopic properties than these manufactured from unmodified ones. The intention of the Fibre+ project is to build on the existing knowledge on fibre modification for adapting, implementing and disseminating this innovative technology in European paper SMEs.

Results of the Fibre+ project on recycled fibres for packaging paper and information on potential developments of the Fibre+ concept can be found on the Fibre+ website including scientific articles that have been published as a consequence of the RTD work that has been carried out during the project.
