= 1973 in Taiwan =

- Decades: 1950s; 1960s; 1970s; 1980s; 1990s
- See also: Other events of 1973; History of Taiwan • Timeline • Years

Events from the year 1973 in Taiwan, Republic of China. This year is numbered Minguo 62 according to the official Republic of China calendar.

== Incumbents ==
- President – Chiang Kai-shek
- Vice President – Yen Chia-kan
- Premier – Chiang Ching-kuo
- Vice Premier – Hsu Ching-chung

== Events ==
=== April ===
- 1 April – The establishment of Taiwan Water Corporation.

=== July ===
- 21 July – The establishment of Flying Camel.

=== September ===
- 1 September – The establishment of Criminal Investigation Bureau.
- 3 September – A ferry capsizes in Kaohsiung, killing 25 women.

== Births ==
- 17 January – Lin Shu-fen, member of Legislative Yuan.
- 21 February – Bowie Tsang, singer, actress, TV host and author.
- 19 August – Huang Kuo-chang, leader of New Power Party.
- 10 September – Kao Yi-feng, author
- 13 September – Chen Lien-hung, baseball player.
- 5 October – Chen Wen-bin, former professional baseball player.
- 29 October – Kelly Lin, actress and model.
- 9 December – Shino Lin, singer and actress.
- 18 December – Ho Hsin-chun, member of 8th and 9th Legislative Yuan.
- 30 December – Chen Je-chang, professional baseball player.

== Deaths ==
- 4 February – Shen Fazao, 68, general.
- 10 March – Li Mi, 70, general.
- 7 September – Li Zikuan, 91, politician and Buddhist layman.
- 13 September – Sun Fo, 81, politician, Premier (1932, 1948–1949), President of the Legislative Yuan (1932–1948), President of the Examination Yuan (1966–1973).
- 19 September – Qu Yingguang, 90, politician and revolutionary.
- 30 September – Li Shizeng, 92, politician, educator, and revolutionary.
