= Adelaida =

Adelaida is a feminine given name. People with the name include:

- Adelaida Abarca Izquierdo (b. 1923), Spanish Republican political activist.
- Adelaida Avagyan (1924-2000), Armenian physician, researcher, and leader in healthcare
- Adelaida Cellars
- Adelaida Ferré Gomis (1881-1955), Spanish historian, teacher, and folklorist
- Adelaida García Morales (1945-2014), Spanish writer
- Adelaida Gertsyk (1874-1925), Russian translator, poet and writer
- Adelaida Martínez Aguilar (1870 — ?), Mexican teacher, writer, and poet
- Adelaida Negri (1943-2019), Argentine operatic soprano
- Adelaida Pchelintseva (born 1999), Kazakhstani swimmer
- Adelaida Pérez Hung, Cuban actress, radio announcer, and radio writer
- Adelaida Ruiz (born 1988), American professional boxer
- Adelaida Semyonovna Simonovitch (1844-1933), Russian educator and the founder of the first kindergarten in Russia
- Adelaida Soler, Argentine film, stage, radio, television and theater actress

== Other uses ==
- Adelaida, California, unincorporated community in San Luis Obispo County, California, U.S.
- Adelaida District AVA, American Viticultural Area in San Luis Obispo County, California, U.S.
- Loxosceles adelaida, species of venomous recluse spider found in South America

== See also ==
- Adelaide (disambiguation)
