= 1967 in Taiwan =

- Decades: 1940s; 1950s; 1960s; 1970s; 1980s
- See also: Other events of 1967; History of Taiwan • Timeline • Years

Events from the year 1967 in Taiwan, Republic of China. This year is numbered Minguo 56 according to the official Republic of China calendar.

== Incumbents ==
- President – Chiang Kai-shek
- Vice President – Yen Chia-kan
- Premier – Yen Chia-kan
- Vice Premier – Huang Shao-ku

== Events ==
=== January ===
- 1 January – The establishment of Cheng Shin Rubber.
- 11 January – The establishment of Yunlin Prison in Yunlin County.
- 13 January – Cross-Strait conflict: Republic of China Air Force Lockheed F-104G Starfighters engage People's Liberation Army Naval Air Force Mikoyan-Gurevich MiG-19s in the final direct confrontation between China and Taiwan.

=== March ===
- 11 March – The opening of Land Reform Museum in Songshan District, Taipei City.

=== May ===
- 16 May – The groundbreaking ceremony for the construction of Fo Guang Shan in Dashu Township, Kaohsiung County.

=== June ===
- 30 June – The establishment of Nan Jeon Junior College of Technology in Yanshuei Township, Tainan County.

=== July ===
- 1 July
  - Taipei was declared special municipality.
  - Zhongli was upgraded from an urban township to a county-administered city.

=== August ===
- 6 August – The opening of Yun Hsien Resort in Wulai Township, Taipei County.

=== September ===
- 16 September – The establishment of Directorate-General of Personnel Administration.

== Births ==
- 22 February – Danny Wen, writer
- 11 March – Kuo Kuo-wen, Deputy Minister of Labor (2016–2017)
- 29 March – Luo Yijun, writer
- 20 April – Kerris Tsai, singer
- 30 April
  - Lily Tien, actress
  - Phil Chang, singer
- 2 May – Kang Kang, singer and television host
- 1 July – Sansan Chien, former composer
- 6 July – Cheng Wen-tsan, Mayor of Taoyuan City
- 19 October – Liao Hsiao-chun, television presenter
- 20 December – Hsiao Ya-chuan, film director
