= 1971 in Taiwan =

- Decades: 1950s; 1960s; 1970s; 1980s; 1990s
- See also: Other events of 1971; History of Taiwan • Timeline • Years

Events from the year 1971 in Taiwan, Republic of China. This year is numbered Minguo 60 according to the official Republic of China calendar.

== Incumbents ==
- President – Chiang Kai-shek
- Vice President – Yen Chia-kan
- Premier – Yen Chia-kan
- Vice Premier – Chiang Ching-kuo

== Events ==
=== January ===
- 31 January – The establishment of CTS Main Channel.

=== April ===
- 21 April – The upgrade of Taoyuan from an urban township to a county-administered city.

=== July ===
- 15 July – The establishment of Dimerco.

=== October ===
- 25 October – The United Nations General Assembly expels the Republic of China and admits the People's Republic of China.

=== December ===
- 3 December – The establishment of China Steel in Taipei.

== Births ==
- 13 January – Miao Ke-li, actress, singer and television host
- 10 March – Lin Yu-chang, Mayor of Keelung City
- 7 May – Chang Sho-wen, member of Legislative Yuan (2005–2009)
- 1 June – Chiu Yi-ying, Deputy Minister of Hakka Affairs Council (2005–2008)
- 17 July – Yang Ya-che, film and television director
- 29 July – Wang Yu-wen, actress
- 7 August – Hsiao Bi-khim, member of Legislative Yuan (2002–2008, 2012–2020)
- 10 November – Huang Hsiu-fang, member of Legislative Yuan

== Deaths ==
- 15 January – Liu Zhi, 78, general.
- 20 April – Chang Li-sheng, 69, Vice Premier of the Republic of China (1948, 1950–1954).
- 13 June – Liu Zhensan, 68, general.
- 23 November – Zhao Hengti, 91, warlord.
- 12 December – Yu Mi-chien, 74, politician.
- 22 December – Xie Guansheng, 74, President of the Judicial Yuan (1958–1971).
