= Cijin District =

District in Kaohsiung, Taiwan

Coordinates: 22°33′42″N 120°18′25″E

Cijin 旗津區 Qijin, Chichin
- District
- Cijin District (Note: Use of the term Cijin in various contexts: Academia: Domestic; Government: Central/ Municipal/ District International; Journalism: Domestic/ International)
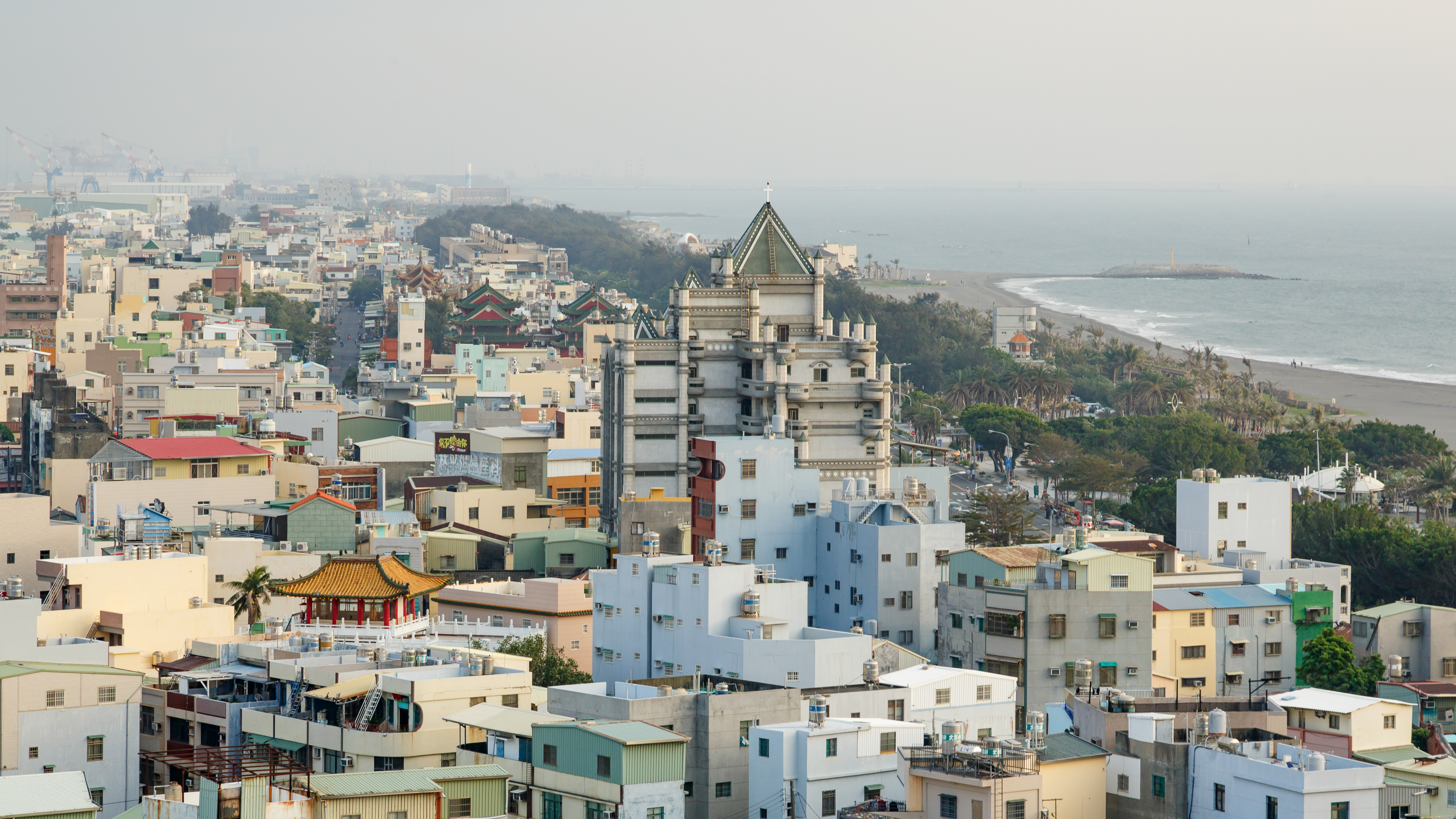

- Cijin 旗津

- Cijin District in Kaohsiung City
- Country: Taiwan
- Region: Southern Taiwan
- Special municipality: Kaohsiung

Government
  - Type: City council
  - Body: Kaohsiung City Council

Area
  - Total: 1.4639 km^{2} (0.5652 sq mi)
  - Rank: 37
- Elevation: 2 m (6.6 ft)

Population (October 2023)
  - Total: 26,282
  - Rank: 26
  - Density: 18,414/km^{2} (47,690/sq mi)
- Time zone: UTC+8
- Postal code: 805
- Website: cijin.kcg.gov.tw/en/

Cijin District
- Traditional Chinese: 旗津區
- Simplified Chinese: 旗津区
- Tongyong Pinyin: Cíjin cyu
Transcriptions
Standard Mandarin
- Hanyu Pinyin: Qíjīn qū
- Bopomofo: ㄑㄧˊ ㄐㄧㄣ ㄑㄩ
- Wade–Giles: Chi^{2}-chin^{1} chü^{1}
- Tongyong Pinyin: Cíjin cyu
- IPA: [tɕʰǐ.tɕín tɕʰý]
Yue: Cantonese
- Yale Romanization: Kèihjēun kēui
- Jyutping: kei4 zeon1 keoi1
- IPA: [kʰej˩.tsɵn˥ kʰɵɥ˥]
Southern Min
- Hokkien POJ: Kî-tin-khu

Cijin District is a district of Kaohsiung City, Taiwan, covering Cijin Island (Note: Use of the term Cijin Island in various contexts:) (旗津島) and islands in the South China Sea. It is the second smallest district in Kaohsiung City after Yancheng District, with an area of 1.4639 square kilometers, or 0.5652 square miles. It has a population of 26,282 as of October 2023, making it the 26th most populated district in Kaohsiung, with a population density of 18,414 people per square kilometer, or 47,692 people per square mile.

== History ==
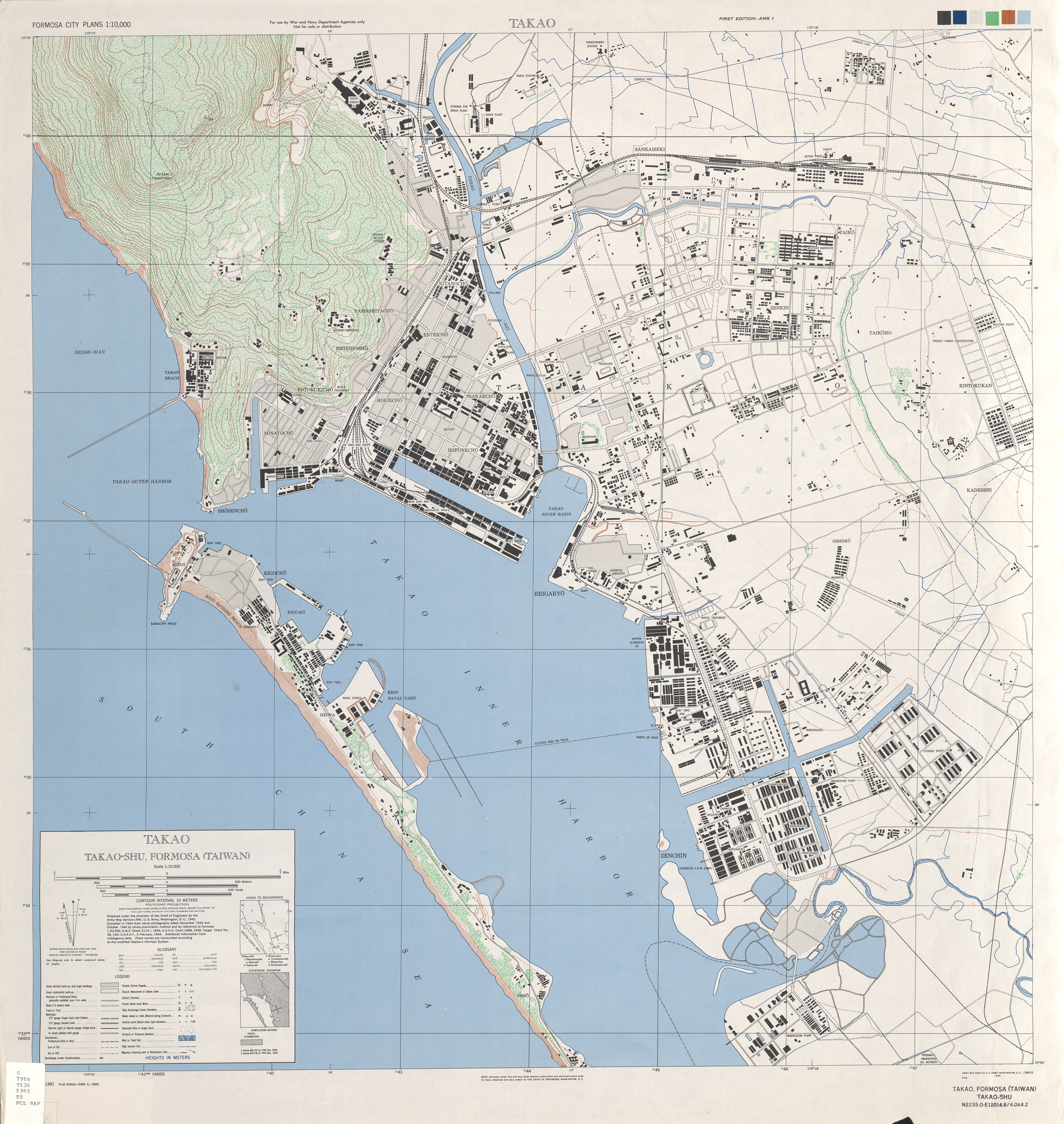
Area that later became Cijin Island shown as part of Takao Prefecture then under Japanese rule during World War II (AMS, 1945)

Cijin forms the original core of the Kaohsiung, which was established by the fisherman Hsu Ah-hua (徐阿華) in the mid-17th century. He realized the attractiveness of the location when he was forced to seek shelter from a typhoon in the Taiwan Strait and returned with settlers from the Hung, Wang, Tsai, Lee, Pai, and Pan families and an idol of the Chinese sea goddess Ma-tsu. This was housed in a bamboo and thatch structure that formed the first Cijin Tianhou Temple. The town grew up around the temple grounds.

HMS Reynard was wrecked near Pratas Island on May 31, 1851.

Cijin Island was once connected to the mainland at the southern tip, but in 1967, this link was severed to create a second entry point to the Port of Kaohsiung. Currently Cijin Island is connected to the mainland via tunnel, thus the island is not valid for Offshore Islands Development Act.

== Geography ==
Cijin Island is 8.5 km (5.3 mi) long with an average width of 400 m (1,300 ft).

Two islands and one reef in the South China Sea are administered by Kaohsiung City as part of the districts Zhongxing Village:

- Pratas Island on Dongsha Atoll
- Taiping Island
- Zhongzhou Reef

== Administrative divisions ==
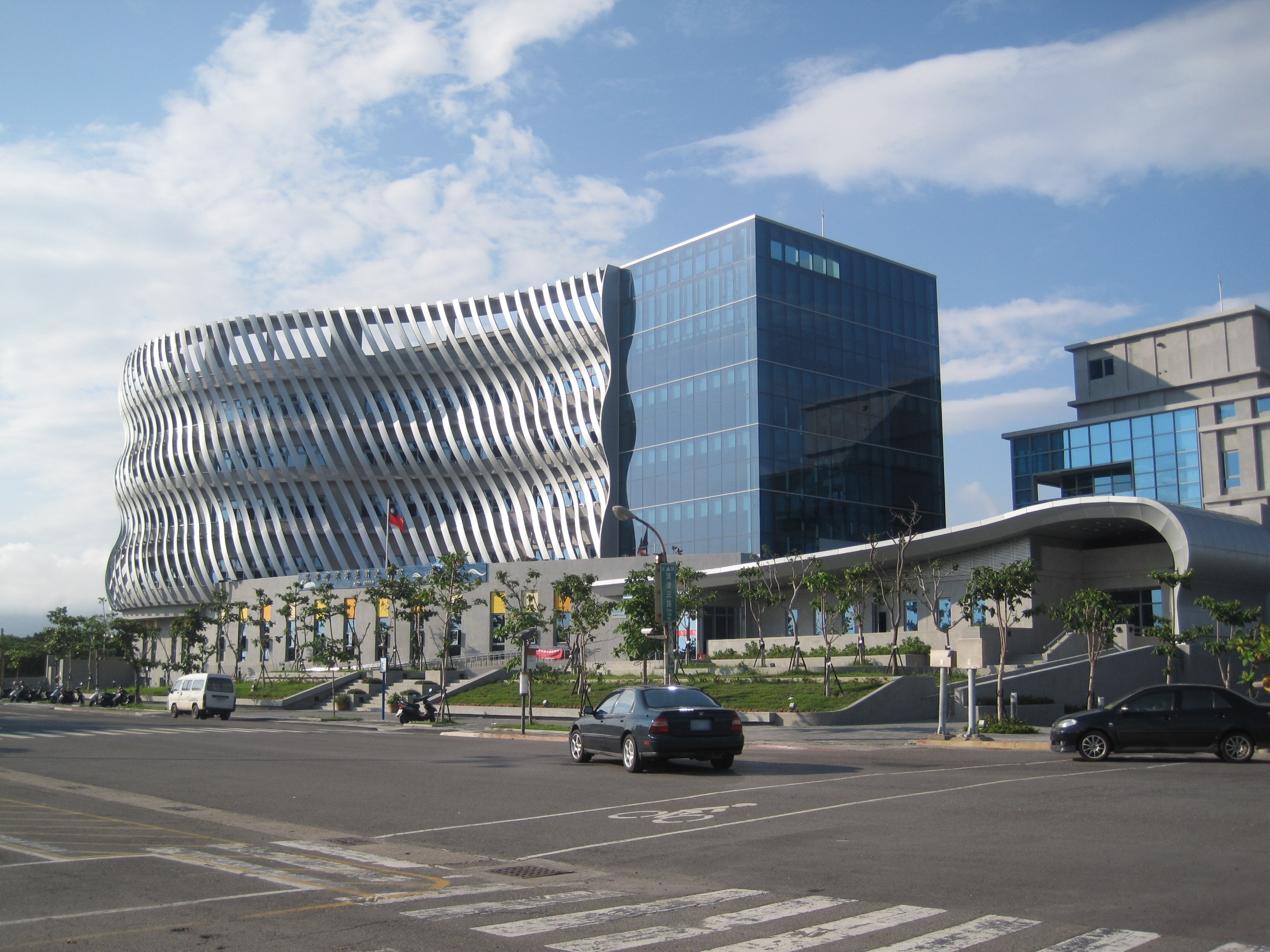
Cijin District Administrative Center, Kaohsiung City

The district consists of Cisia (Qixia), Yongan, Jhensing (Zhenxing), Ciai, Fuxing, Zhonghua, Shijian, Beishan, Nanshan, Shangzhu, Zhongzhou, Anshun and Jhongsing (Zhongxing) Villages.

Cijin District administrative divisions

== Government ==
The councilor for Cijin District in the Kaohsiung City Council is Lee Chiao-ju.

== Economy ==
Most of its residents are employed by the shipping industry. There is a park on the north western shore.

== Education ==
=== Universities ===
- National Kaohsiung University of Science and Technology

=== Junior high schools ===
- Kaohsiung Municipal Cijin Junior High School

=== Elementary schools ===
- Kaohsiung Municipal Cijin Elementary School
- Kaohsiung Municipal Dashan Elementary School
- Kaohsiung Municipal Zhongzhou Elementary School

== Tourist attractions ==
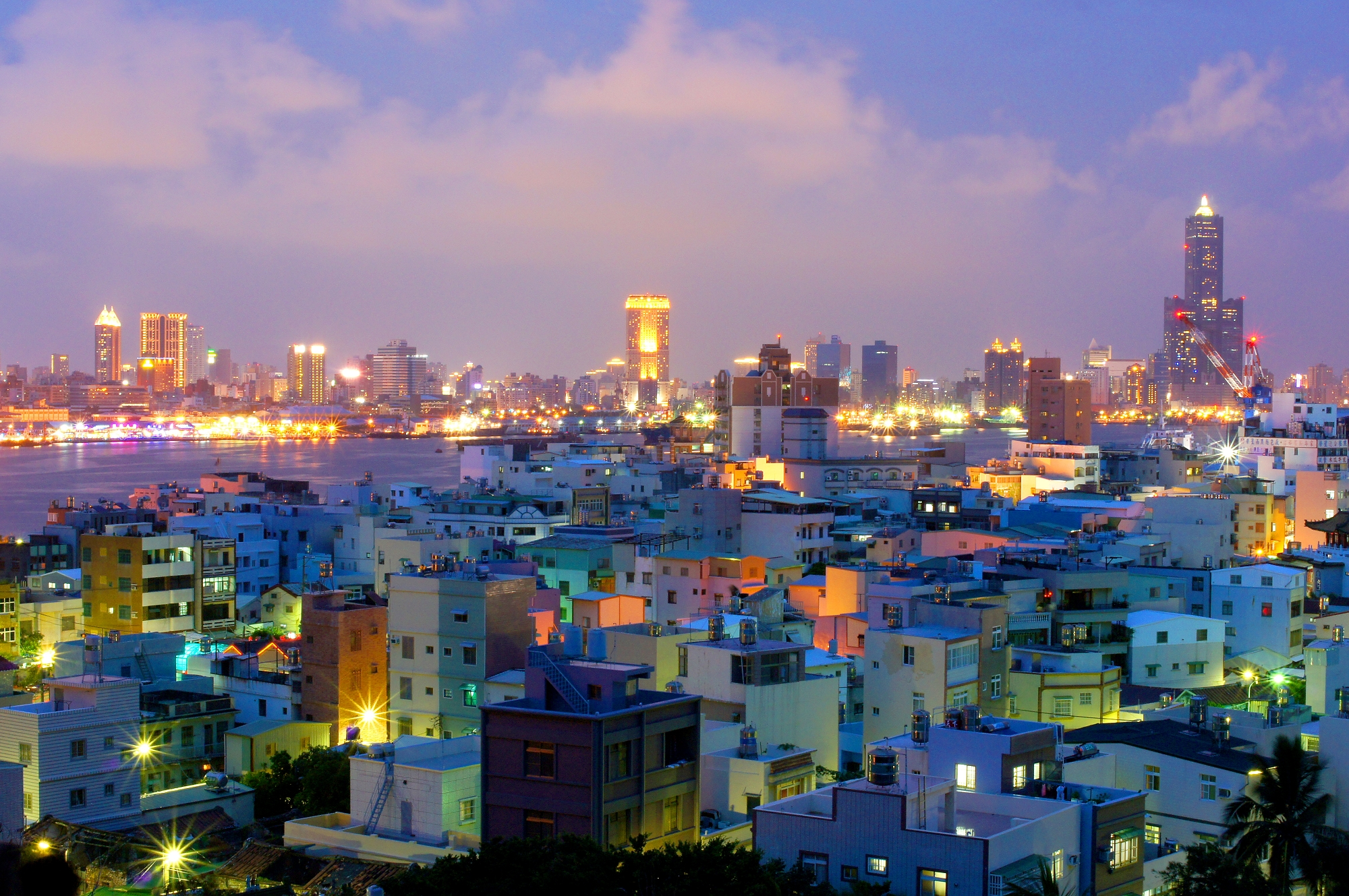
night view of Cijin

There are numerous tourist attractions in Cijin District.

=== Cijin Island proper ===
- Cijin Old Street
- Cihou Market
- Cijin Tianhou Temple
- Cijin Lingshui Temple
- Cihou Fort
- Cijin Tunnel
- Mount Cihou
- Cijin Shell Museum
- Cijin Wind Turbine Park
- Cijin Beach
- Cijin Memorial Park for Women Laborers
- Kaohsiung Lighthouse
- Rainbow Church
- War and Peace Memorial Park and Theme Hall
- YM Museum of Marine Exploration Kaohsiung

=== Outer Islands ===
- Dongsha Atoll National Park
- Taiping Cultural Park

== Transportation ==
=== Cijin Island proper ===
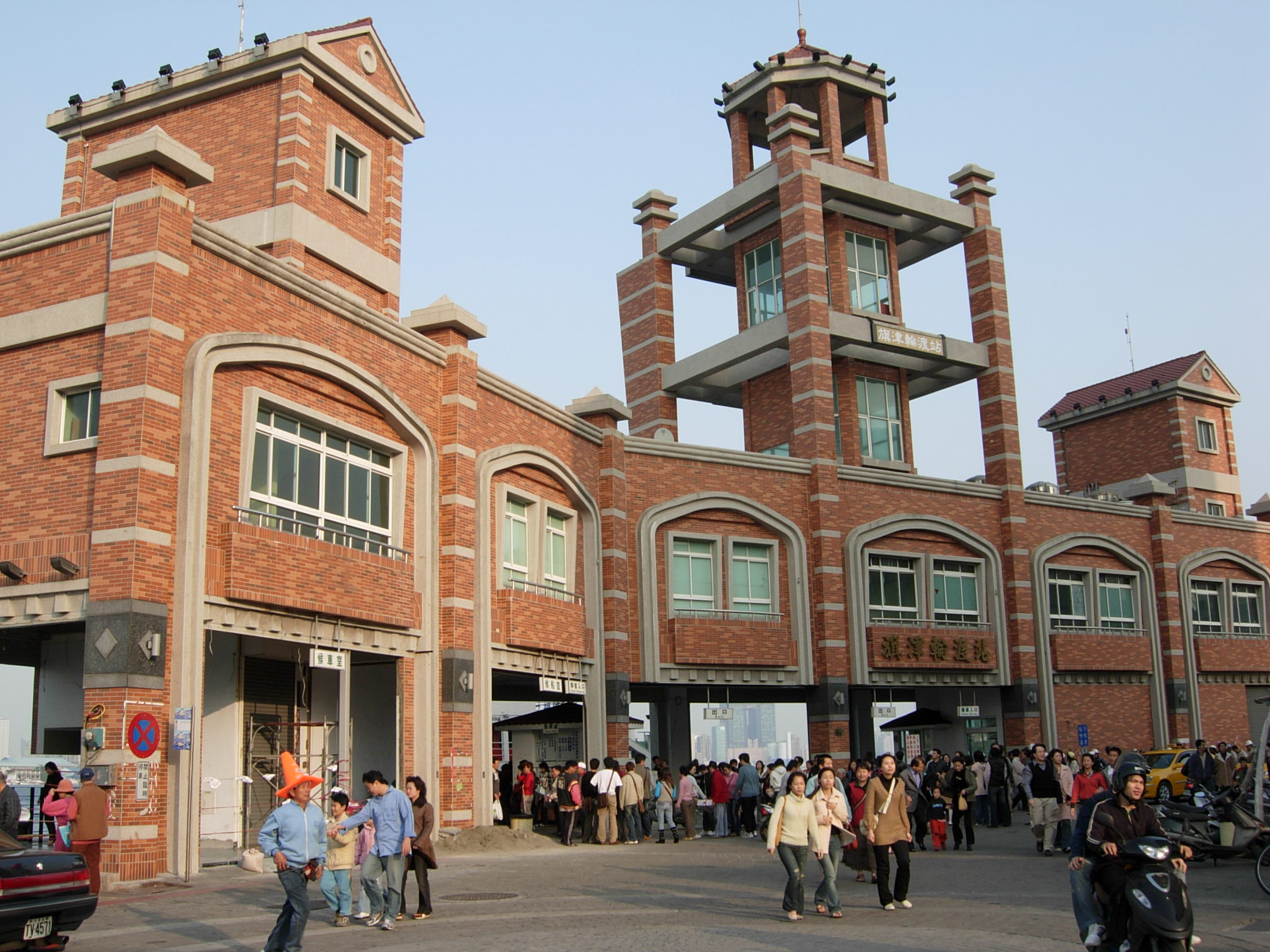
Cijin Ferry Pier

The "Cross Harbor Tunnel" (Chinese: 過港隧道) connects Cijin Island at the southern tip of the island to the rest of Kaohsiung on mainland Taiwan. Cijin District is also accessible by two ferry piers, the Cijin Ferry Pier at the northern tip of the island and the Zhongzhou Ferry Pier at the middle of the island.

=== Outer Islands ===
Dongsha Airport and Taiping Island Airport.

== See also ==
- List of Taiwanese superlatives
