= Cijin Tianhou Temple =

Temple in Cijin, Kaohsiung, Taiwan

- 旗津天后宮
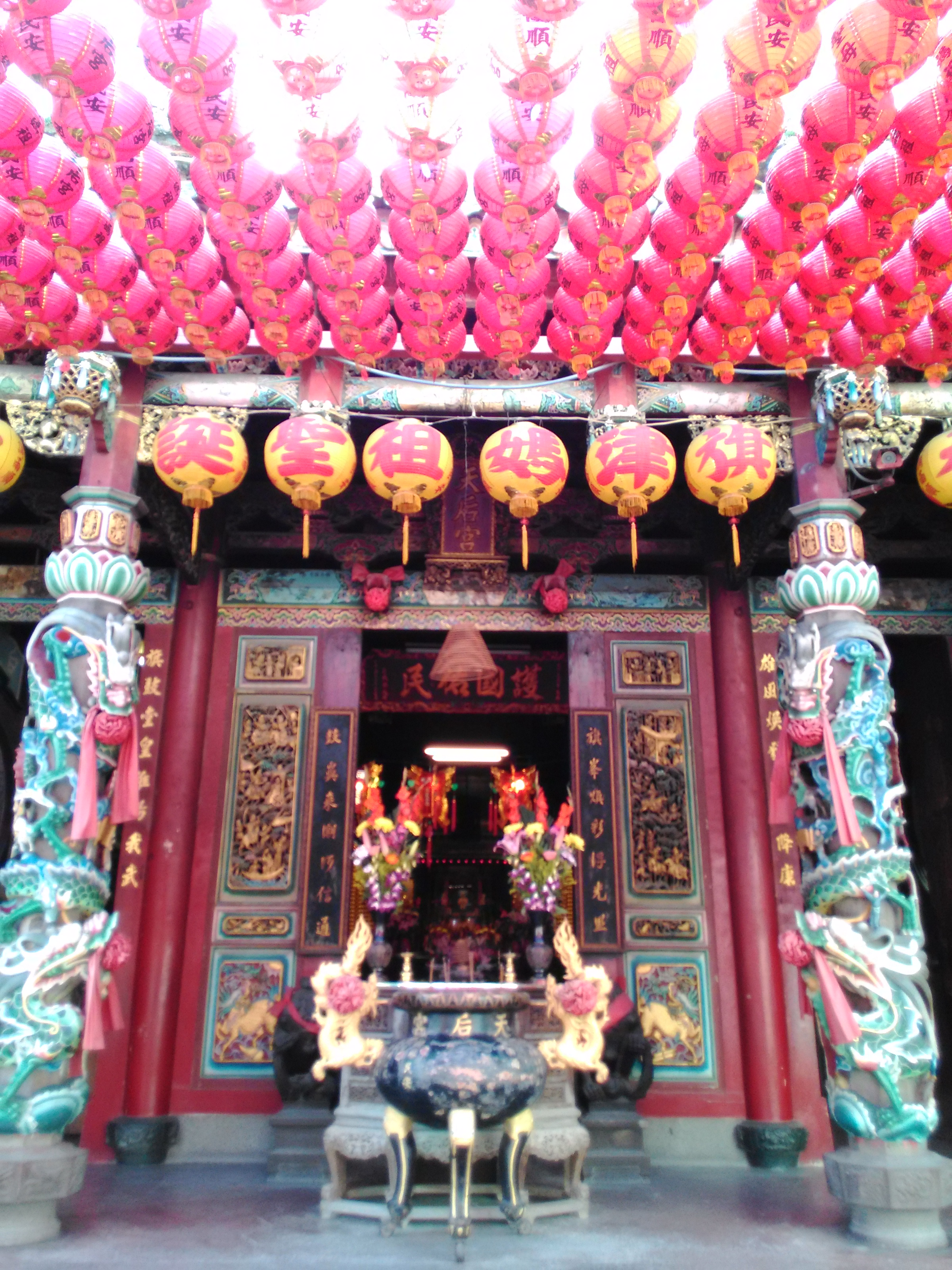

- Taiwan

Location
- Location: Cijin, Kaohsiung, Taiwan
- Interactive map of Cijin Tianhou Temple
- Coordinates: 22°36′48.2″N 120°16′06.3″E

Architecture
- Type: Mazu Temple
- Established: 1673

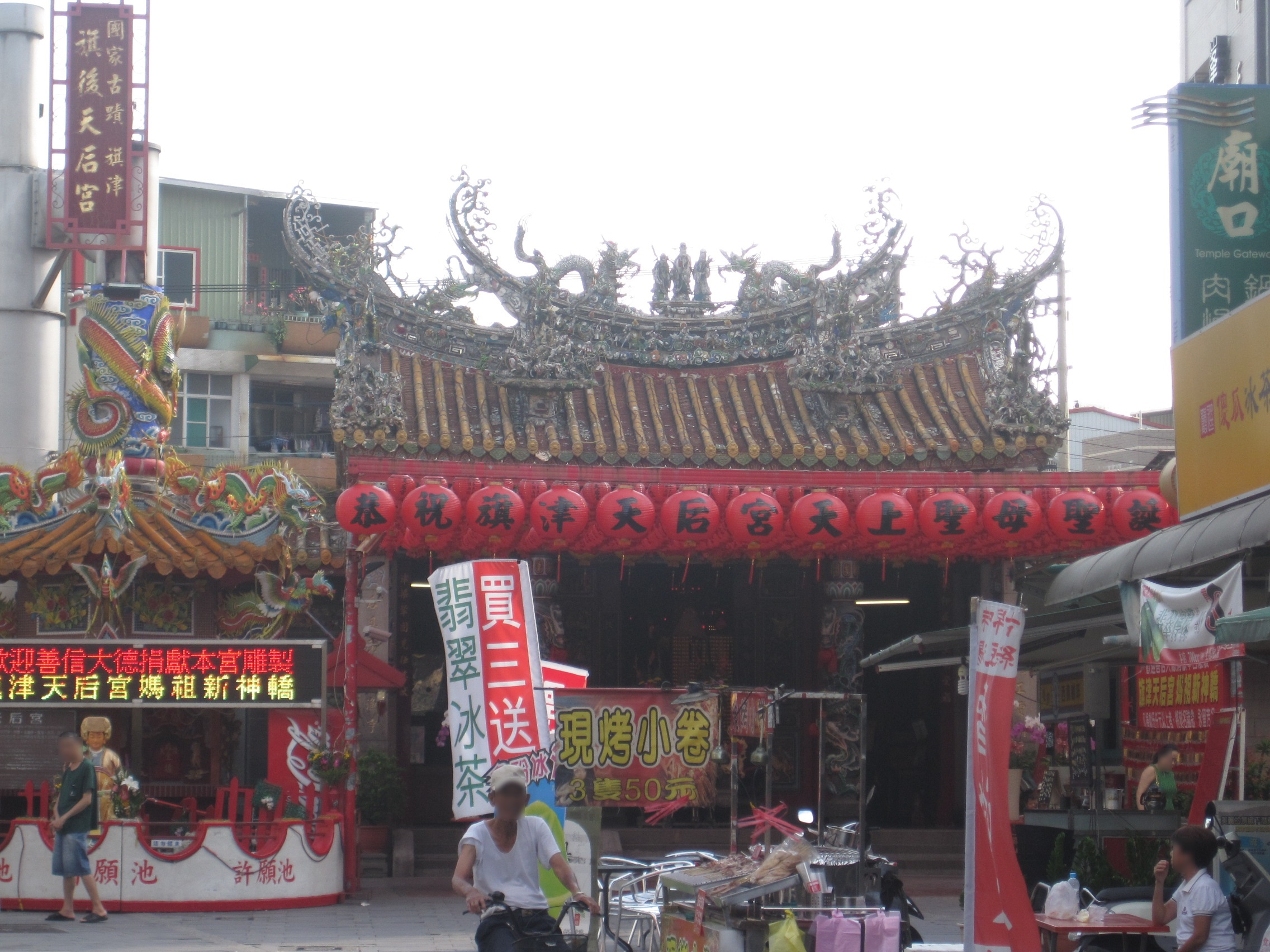
The temple in 2013

The Cijin Tianhou Temple, also known as the Cihou Tianhou Temple, or Chi Jin Mazu Temple, is a temple dedicated to the Chinese Goddess Mazu, who is the Goddess of Sea and Patron Deity of fishermen, sailors and any occupations related to sea/ocean. It is located at 93 Miaocian Road (廟前路93號) on Cijin District, Kaohsiung, Taiwan.

== History ==
The temple was Kaohsiung's first temple to Mazu. It was first opened in 1673, when Taiwan still formed the Kingdom of Tungning ruled by the Ming-loyalist Zheng dynasty. Koxinga's son Zheng Jing attempted to abandon the Ming cause and seek peaceful recognition as an independent leader from the Kangxi Emperor but was rebuffed and forced into a defensive war with the mainland. The Chi Jin temple was built to house an idol of Mazu brought by the Fujianese fishermen who first settled the island under Hsu Au-hua. The Hung, Wang, Cai, Li, Bai, and Pan families were chiefly responsible for the temples' governance and property, which formed the core of early Kaohsiung.

Mazu was credited with the success of the Qing conquest of Taiwan in 1683 and the temple changed its name to reflect her new title of "Heavenly Empress" around 1737.

The Chi Jin Mazu Temple was originally composed of bamboo and thatch but, in the 18th century, it was redone in stone. It was restored by the Jhang Yi Ji in 1887 and by Cai Ji-Liou in 1926, when much of its present artwork was completed by the master Chen Yu-feng. Following damage over the course of the Second World War, it was restored again in 1948 under the direction of Cai Wun-bin. It became a protected monument of the city on 27 November 1985.

== Architecture ==
The temple exemplifies "southern-style" religious architecture, with two guard rooms, five doors, and two halls connected by a pagoda. Its entrance is guarded by two foo dogs. The "swallow-tail" ridges of its roof are decorated with two dragons arched over an immortal; it also includes figures of the Three Stars representing Luck, Wealth, and Long-life. The bell in the courtyard at the side of the temple was cast in 1886.

== Services ==
The temple is open to the public daily from 5:30 am to 10 pm.
