= Chen Wenbin =

Chen Wenbin may refer to:

- Akira Chen (born 1969), Taiwanese actor and politician
- Chen Wen-bin (born 1973), Taiwanese baseball player
