= 1974 in Taiwan =

- Decades: 1950s; 1960s; 1970s; 1980s; 1990s
- See also: Other events of 1974; History of Taiwan • Timeline • Years

Events from the year 1974 in Taiwan, Republic of China. This year is numbered Minguo 63 according to the official Republic of China calendar.

== Incumbents ==
- President – Chiang Kai-shek
- Vice President – Yen Chia-kan
- Premier – Chiang Ching-kuo
- Vice Premier – Hsu Ching-chung

== Events ==
=== July ===
- 20 July – The establishment of TKK Fried Chicken.

== Births ==
- 17 March – Kolas Yotaka, spokesperson of Executive Yuan
- 2 May – Chang Chen-yue, singer
- 28 May – Rosalia Wu, member of 9th Legislative Yuan
- 19 July – Chen Ting-fei, member of 8th and 9th Legislative Yuan
- 7 October – Alyssa Chia, actress
- 19 October – Wang Ginn-wang, Minister of Coast Guard Administration (2006–2014)
- 18 November – Hsieh Che-ching, writer
- 25 December – Jeannie Hsieh, singer-songwriter, dancer, actress and model

== Deaths ==
- 2 January – Jiang Dingwen, 78, general.
- 21 January – Xiong Shihui, 80, general and administrator.
- 1 November – Ku Cheng-ting, 71, politician.
- 16 December - Xu Tingyao, 82, general.
