= 1969 in Taiwan =

- Decades: 1940s; 1950s; 1960s; 1970s; 1980s
- See also: Other events of 1969; History of Taiwan • Timeline • Years

Events in the year 1969 in Taiwan, Republic of China. This year is numbered Minguo 58 according to the official Republic of China calendar.

== Incumbents ==
- President – Chiang Kai-shek
- Vice President – Yen Chia-kan
- Premier – Yen Chia-kan
- Vice Premier – Huang Shao-ku, Chiang Ching-kuo

== Events ==
=== February ===
- 24 February – Far Eastern Air Transport Flight 104 crash landed in Tainan.

=== March ===
- 1 March – The establishment of Aero Industry Development Center in Taichung.

=== July ===
- 1 July – The establishment of National Chung-Shan Institute of Science and Technology in Longtan District, Taoyuan City.

=== October ===
- 31 October – The official inauguration of CTV Main Channel.

=== November ===
- 24 November – 75th anniversary of Kuomintang at Taipei City Hall, Taipei.

=== December ===
- 20 December – 1969 Republic of China National Assembly and legislative election.

== Births ==
- 17 January – Hsu Li-ming, acting Mayor of Kaohsiung (2018)
- 5 February – Wu Yu-jen, member of Legislative Yuan
- 8 February
  - Hsieh Ming-yu, singer and songwriter
  - John Wu, Magistrate of Taoyuan County (2009-2014)
- 26 February
  - Nai Hui-fang, former long and triple jump athlete
  - Vincent Fang, lyricist
- 4 March – Liu Shueh-shuan, composer
- 9 March – Liu Chien-kuo, member of Legislative Yuan
- 26 March – Jeff Chang, singer
- 16 April – Tsai Chi-chang, deputy speaker of Legislative Yuan
- 29 May – Qiu Miaojin, former novelist
- 1 June – Rene Liu, singer and actress
- 24 July – Zero Chou, director and screenwriter
- 11 August – Lisa Huang, member of Legislative Yuan (2012–2014)
- 16 August – Wei Te-sheng, film director and screenwriter
- 20 September – Huang Yee-ling, singer
- 19 October – Yi Huan, comic writer
- 29 October – Tao Ching-ying, singer and hostess
- 23 November – Rao Ching-ling, Magistrate-elect of Taitung County
- 12 December – Yao Jen-to, Vice Chairperson and Secretary-General of Straits Exchange Foundation

== Deaths ==
- 13 February – Ou Zhen, 70, general.
- 24 June – Liu Wei, 63, general.
- 16 September – Yin Haiguang, 49, philosopher, educator, and author.
- 25 December – Luo Jialun, 72, politician, historian, and diplomat.
