= 1972 in Taiwan =

- Decades: 1950s; 1960s; 1970s; 1980s; 1990s
- See also: Other events of 1972; History of Taiwan • Timeline • Years

Events from the year 1972 in Taiwan, Republic of China. This year is numbered Minguo 61 according to the official Republic of China calendar.

== Incumbents ==
- President – Chiang Kai-shek
- Vice President – Yen Chia-kan
- Premier – Yen Chia-kan, Chiang Ching-kuo
- Vice Premier – Chiang Ching-kuo, Hsu Ching-chung

== Events ==
=== January ===
- 1 January – The establishment of CTS Education and Culture.

=== March ===
- 17 March – The commissioning of Unit 2 of Linkou Power Plant in Taipei County.
- 27 March – The establishment of Van Nung School of Industrial Skills in Zhongli City, Taoyuan County.

=== April ===
- 24 April – The 7.2 M_{s} Ruisui earthquake occurred in Hualien County.

=== May ===
- 16 May – The establishment of Sun Yat-sen Memorial Hall in Xinyi District, Taipei City.

=== July ===
- 1 July – The upgrade of Banqiao and Fongshan from urban townships to be county-administered cities.
- 12 July – The reopening of Yunlin Prison after relocation in Huwei Township, Yunlin County.

=== December ===
- 23 December – 1972 Republic of China National Assembly and legislative election.
- 29 December – The changing of Tourism Council to Tourism Bureau.

=== Full date unknown ===
- The Death Duel, a Taiwanese and Hong Kong film is released.

== Births ==
- 10 January – Chang Hung-lu, member of Legislative Yuan
- 30 March – Mickey Huang, comedian and television host
- 23 April – Hsu Hsin-ying, founder and Chairperson of Minkuotang (2015–2018)
- 26 June – Yang Cheng-wu, Magistrate of Kinmen County
- 29 June – Chao Chien-ming, surgeon
- 24 July – Chiu Chih-wei, member of Legislative Yuan
- 9 August – A-mei, singer and songwriter
- 24 August – Francesca Kao, actress, singer and television host
- 7 October – Will Liu, singer, composer, songwriter and actor
- 11 December – Brenda Wang, actress and model
- 25 December – Jeannie Hsieh, singer-songwriter, dancer, actress and model

== Deaths ==
- 23 February – Chen Wei-ping, 95, diplomat and chaplain.
- 6 March – Chen Jia-shang, 62–63, general.
- 20 April – Xie Yingzhou, 77, politician and jurist, Vice President of the Judicial Yuan (1966–1972), President of the Supreme Court (1948–1966).
- 15 May – Lee Shih-tsung, 73, President of the Control Yuan (1965–1972).
- 25 June – Ku Meng-yu, 83–84, Vice Premier of the Republic of China (1948).
- 5 July – Huang Chao-chin, 74, politician and diplomat.
