= Adelaida Negri =

Argentine operatic soprano (1943–2019)

- Negri singing Aida at the Teatro Colón
- Born: 12 December 1943; Buenos Aires, Argentina
- Died: 17 August 2019 (aged 75); Buenos Aires, Argentina
- Occupation: Operatic soprano

Adelaida Negri (12 December 1943 – 17 August 2019) was an Argentine operatic soprano who recorded and performed at leading opera houses. She was known for roles in operas by Puccini and Verdi.

== Life ==
Negri was born in Buenos Aires. She trained as a lawyer, but her talent as a singer took priority. With the gold medal she was awarded by the Instituto Superior de Arte of the Teatro Colón, the British Council helped fund her further study at the London Opera Centre.

She appeared in Don Carlo, Madama Butterfly, Aida, Macbeth, Mefistofele, La vida breve and Proserpina and in the premiere of Juan Carlos Zorzi's Antígona Vélez, but her debut was at the Teatro Colón where had initially trained. She became known for her roles in operas by Verdi and Puccini, but she was known for finding minor works by other composers. Negri made some recordings, but they are considered to have not captured her sound at its best.

She made her base in Europe, where she was appearing in the major operas houses in Western Europe, but rarely in London.

In 1997, she founded "La Casa de la Opera de Buenos Aires" whose aim was to bring on younger talent and a wider operatic repertoire.

Negri died in Buenos Aires in 2019 after a long illness.
