= 1968 in Taiwan =

- Decades: 1940s; 1950s; 1960s; 1970s; 1980s
- See also: Other events of 1968; History of Taiwan • Timeline • Years

Events in the year 1968 in Taiwan, Republic of China. This year is numbered Minguo 57 according to the official Republic of China calendar.

== Incumbents ==
- President – Chiang Kai-shek
- Vice President – Yen Chia-kan
- Premier – Yen Chia-kan
- Vice Premier – Huang Shao-ku

== Events ==
=== May ===
- 9 May – The establishment of Institute of Nuclear Energy Research in Longtan Township, Taoyuan County.

=== July ===
- 18 July – The commissioning of Unit 1 of Linkou Power Plant in Taipei County.

=== September ===
- 1 September – The establishment of Evergreen Marine.
- 3 September – The establishment of China Television.

=== Unknown ===
The nine-year compulsory education system is launched at a time when fewer than nine countries globally have compulsory education systems of this length or more.

== Births ==
- 14 January – Wu Bai, rock singer and songwriter
- 6 July – Chen Kuei-jen, manager of Chinese Taipei national football team (2013-2016)
- 8 June – Liu Chien-sin, acting Secretary-General to the President (2016–2017)
- 13 August – Stephanie Shiao, actress, model, singer, and writer
- 12 October – Hsu Chen-wei, Magistrate of Hualien County
- 21 October – Lee Kang-sheng, actor, film director and screenwriter
- 31 October – Kao Su-po, Minister of Mongolian and Tibetan Affairs Commission (2008-2011)
- 1 November – Chen Chao-jung, actor

== Deaths ==
- 17 April – Mo Teh-hui, 85, politician, President of the Examination Yuan (1954–1966).
- 12 June – Chang Tao-fan, 70, President of the Legislative Yuan (1952–1961).
