= War and Peace Memorial Park and Theme Hall =

Memorial park in Qijin, Kaohsiung, Taiwan

- 戰爭與和平紀念公園主題館
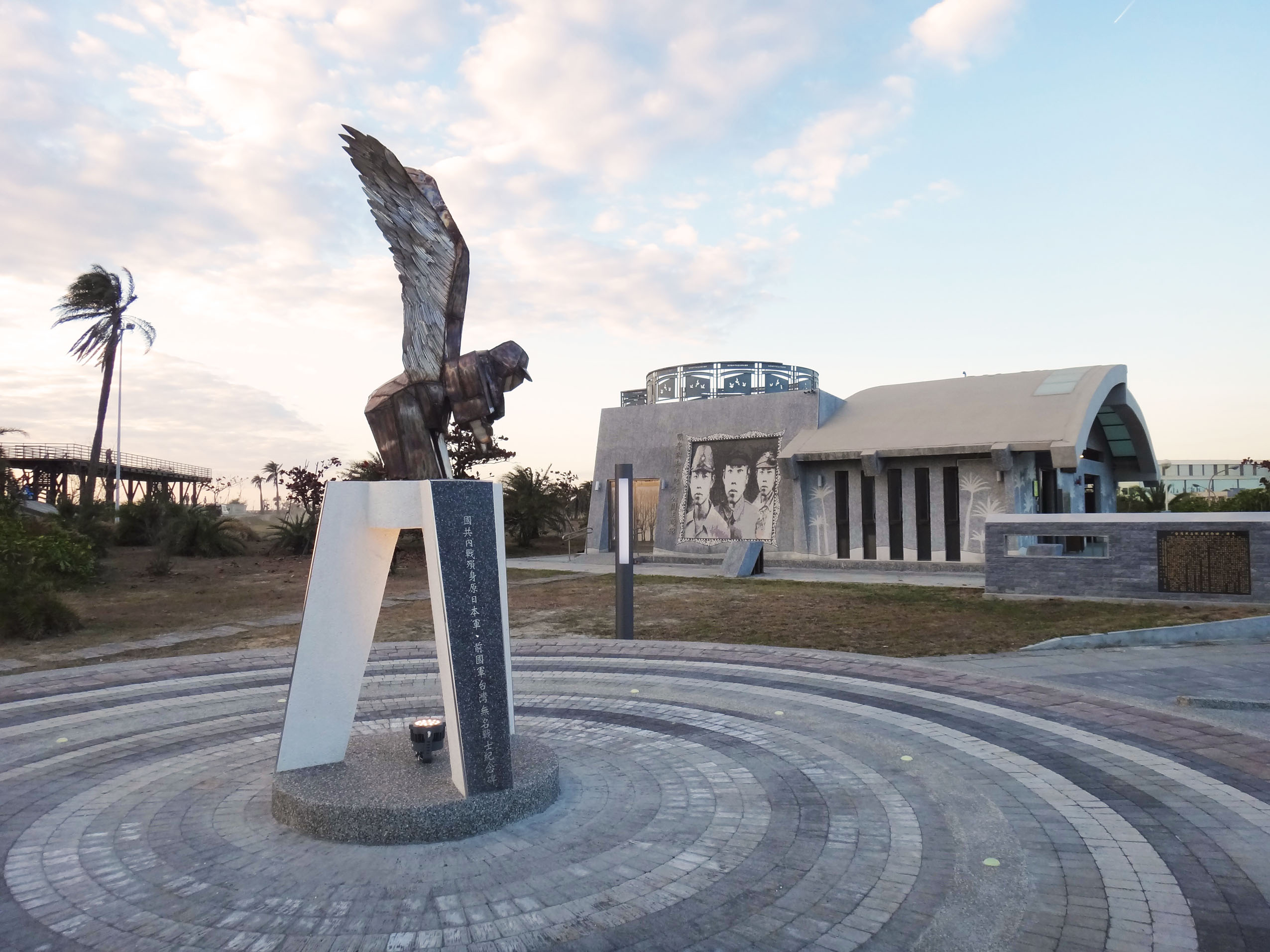
- Interactive map of the War and Peace Memorial Park and Theme Hall area

General information
- Type: memorial park
- Location: Cijin, Kaohsiung, Taiwan
- Coordinates: 22°35′28.3″N 120°16′58.4″E
- Opened: 20 May 2009

The War and Peace Memorial Park and Theme Hall (traditional Chinese: 戰爭與和平紀念公園主題館; simplified Chinese: 战争与和平纪念公园主题馆; pinyin: Zhànzhēng Yǔ Hépíng Jìniàn Gōngyuán Zhǔtí Guǎn) is a memorial in Cijin District, Kaohsiung, Taiwan. It commemorates Republic of China Armed Forces who died during the Chinese Civil War, Korean War and Pacific War.

== History ==
The idea for the establishment of the memorial park was mentioned by Kaohsiung Mayor Chen Chu on 7 June 2008. The park was opened on 20 May 2009.

== Architecture ==
The park consists of the memorial wall of light in the main building, memorial pillars of lanterns, monument plaza and the heart of echoes. The outer wall of the main building depicts picture of men wearing the uniform of Imperial Japanese Army, National Revolutionary Army and People's Liberation Army. Outside the main building lies a memorial stale, square, park and observatory.

== See also ==
- List of tourist attractions in Taiwan
