= Cijin Wind Turbine Park =

Wind farm in Qijin, Kaohsiung, Taiwan

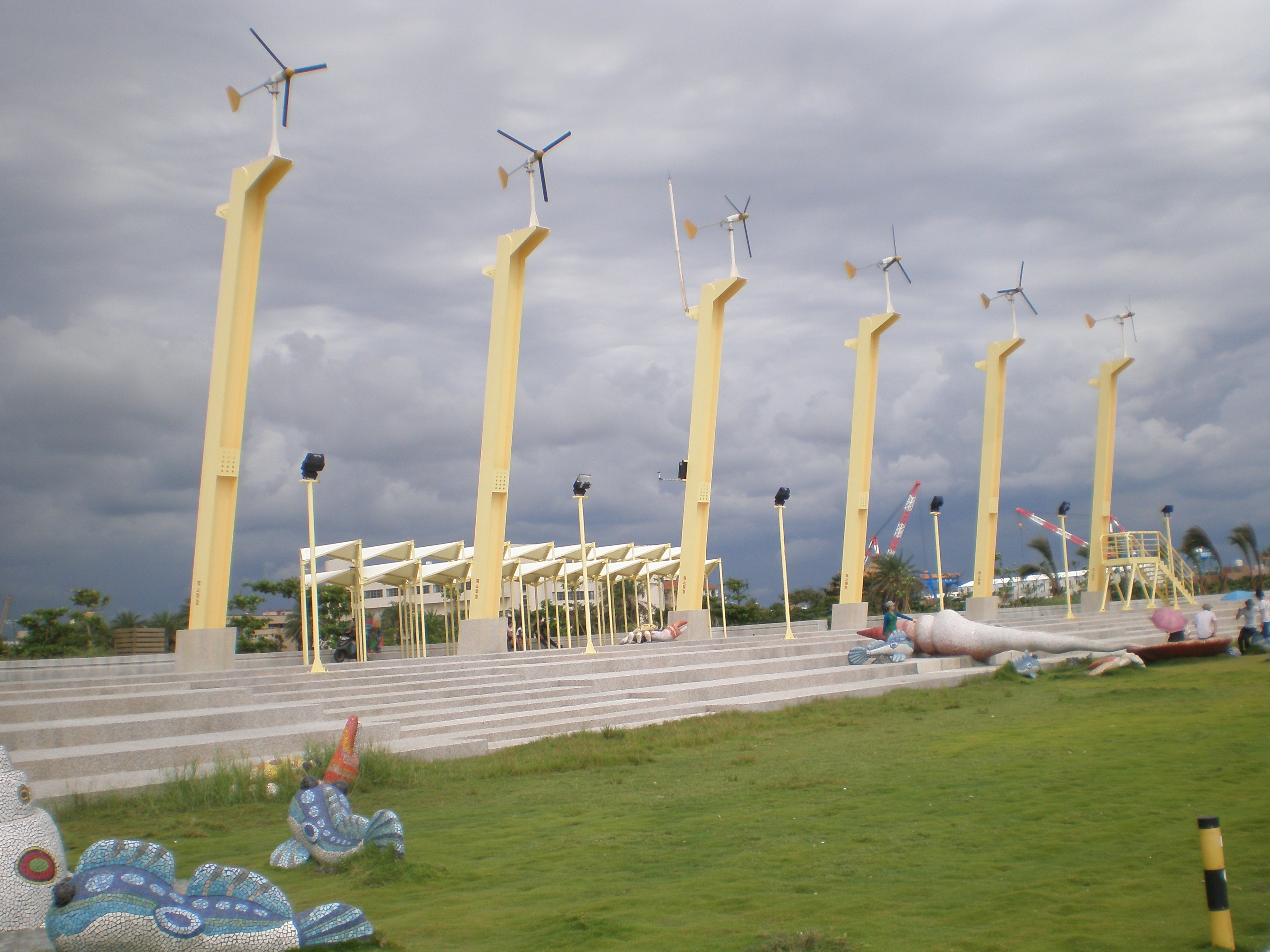
- Interactive map of Cijin Wind Turbine Park

Origin
- Mill location: Cijin, Kaohsiung, Taiwan
- Coordinates: 22°35′17.4″N 120°17′05.2″E
- Year built: 8 March 2003

Information
- Purpose: electricity generation
- Type: wind turbine

The Cijin Wind Turbine Park, Cijin Wind Power Park or Cijin Windmill Park (traditional Chinese: 旗津風車公園; simplified Chinese: 旗津风车公园; Hanyu Pinyin: Qíjīn Fēngchē Gōngyuán; Tongyong Pinyin: Cíjin Fengche Gongyuán) is a recreational wind farm in Cijin District, Kaohsiung, Taiwan.

== History ==
The wind farm was opened on 8 March 2003.

== Generation ==
The park consists of seven 3-blade wind turbines which generate enough power to provide the park with four hours of illumination during night time.

== Features ==
The park also has coastal plants, lawn, viewing platform and a performance square.

== See also ==
- Renewable energy in Taiwan
- Electricity sector in Taiwan
- List of tourist attractions in Taiwan
