= 1970 in Taiwan =

- Decades: 1950s; 1960s; 1970s; 1980s; 1990s
- See also: Other events of 1970; History of Taiwan • Timeline • Years

Events from the year 1970 in Taiwan, Republic of China. This year is numbered Minguo 59 according to the official Republic of China calendar.

== Incumbents ==
- President – Chiang Kai-shek
- Vice President – Yen Chia-kan
- Premier – Yen Chia-kan
- Vice Premier – Chiang Ching-kuo

== Events ==
=== February ===
- 1 February – The establishment of Institute of Economics of the Academia Sinica.
- 8 February – The Taiyuan Prison incident begins.

=== July ===
- 1 July – The establishment of Taiwan External Trade Development Council.

== Births ==
- 4 February – Sean Lien, candidate of Mayor of Taipei City for the 2014 municipal election
- 23 April – Wu Yi-chen, member of Legislative Yuan (2012-2016)
- 28 May – Chang Hsiu-ching, singer
- 29 June – Chang Ting, actress
- 30 June – Chen Jiunn-ming, football player and manager
- 5 September – Wu Pao-chun, baker
- 17 September – Isabelle Cheng, spy
- 24 October – Ying Wei-min, actor and singer
- 27 October – Tarcy Su, singer and actress

== Deaths ==
- 3 January – Gladys Aylward, 67, Christian missionary.
- 31 January – Cheng Tien-hsi, 85, author, jurist, and diplomat (in the United Kingdom).
- 18 March – Pao Chun-chien, 73–74, diplomat.
- 23 March – Kao Ping-tse, 81, astronomer.
- 14 April – Wang Peiren, 69, politician.
- 13 July – Sheng Shicai, (c. 70s), Pro-Soviet and later pro-Kuomintang warlord of Xinjiang.
