= Hung (surname) =

Hung is a non-pinyin romanisation of multiple Chinese surnames, based on different varieties of Chinese.

== Romanisations of 洪 and 红 ==
Hung is the Mandarin Wade–Giles romanisation of multiple surnames spelled in pinyin as Hóng (洪, 红, 弘). The first two of those surnames are also spelled Hung in Hong Kong Government Cantonese Romanisation (the latter is spelled Wang).

== Cantonese romanisation of 熊 ==
Hung is a Cantonese romanisation of the surname spelled in pinyin as Xióng (熊). People with this surname include:

- Hung Yan-yan (熊欣欣; born 1965), Hong Kong martial artist
- Lynn Hung (熊黛林; born 1980), Hong Kong model and actress

== Cantonese romanisation of 孔 ==
Hung is a Cantonese romanisation of the surname spelled in pinyin as Kǒng (孔). People with this surname include:

- Susan Tse (Hung Ling-fook 孔令馥; born 1953), Hong Kong television actress
- William Hung (孔慶翔; born 1983), Hong Kong-born American former singer

== Other ==
- Adelaida Pérez Hung (born 1959), Cuban actress and radio announcer
- María Hung (born 1960), Venezuelan swimmer
- Ling-Yue Hung (born 1964), Hong Kong curler
- Hung Kai-chun (黃楷峻; born 1987), Taiwanese football midfielder
- Jenny Hung (born 1991), Taiwanese-born New Zealand table tennis player
- Francesca Hung (born 1994), Miss Universe Australia 2018 and Top 20 Miss Universe 2018
- Emmanuelle Hung Atienza (2006–2025), Filipino-Taiwanese social media influencer
