= Cijin Memorial Park for Women Laborers =

Memorial in Qijin, Kaohsiung, Taiwan

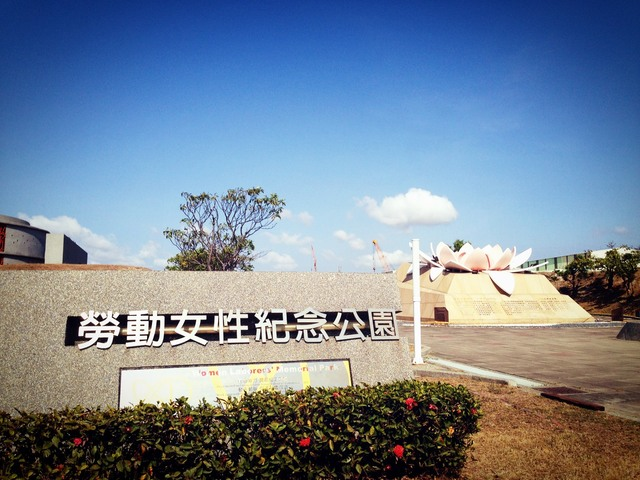
- Interactive map of Cijin Memorial Park for Women Laborers

Details
- Location: Cijin, Kaohsiung, Taiwan
- Coordinates: 22°35′40.82″N 120°16′53.24″E
- Type: Cemetery

The Memorial Park for Women Laborers originally named the Twenty-five Ladies' Tomb, is located in Cijin District, Kaohsiung, Taiwan. It acts as a memorial to 25 young women who drowned in a ferry accident on their way to work in the nearby export processing district.

== History ==
On the morning of September 3, 1973, a small ferry capsized while carrying over 70 passengers (despite a maximum capacity of 13) from Cijin Island to Kaohsiung City. Twenty-five of the passengers, all of whom were unmarried young women and most of whom were laborers in the export processing zone, drowned.

The reason the victims were all young, unmarried women is likely because the Taiwanese economic development of 1973 allowed for many families to provide better education opportunities for their children. Since boys were typically the priority recipients of these opportunities, girls entered the workforce immediately after middle school in order to support their families. Many girls and young women in the area thus ended up with jobs the export processing district.

Due to the expansion of the Kaohsiung port in 1967, there were few transportation options between Cijin Island and Kaohsiung City. Residents relied on ferries run by both the Kaohsiung city government and private companies. The 1973 investigation found that the ferry had passed a recent safety inspection although it did not have lifesaving equipment and the captain did not have a license. The central supervising government agency, the Port of Kaohsiung, was subsequently found negligent in its duties to protect ferry passengers.

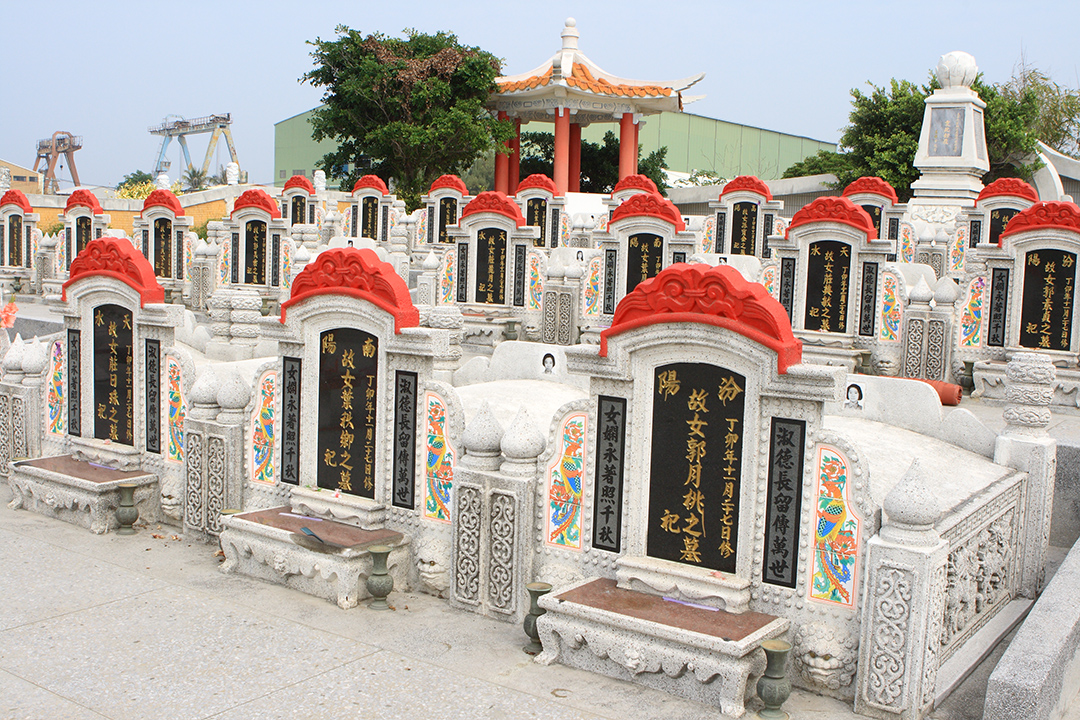
Twenty-five Ladies’ Tomb”

Traditional Taiwanese superstitions dictate that unmarried women cannot be buried in their patrilineal ancestral shrines. Instead, most families will choose to arrange a spirit marriage for the deceased or create a separate shrine where the spirit can reside. Chuang Chin-Chun, the father of one of the victims, urged the other families not to bury their daughters separately but to have them buried together. The Kaohsiung City Government, most likely because of its responsibility in the tragedy, helped find a plot of land to bury the victims together between the Zhongxing and Zhonghe boroughs. This site was named the Twenty-five Ladies' Tomb. Due to the construction of the Fourth Container Storage Center, it was later relocated to its current location.

In 2004, the Kaohsiung Association for the Promotion of Women's Rights (KAPWR) began lobbying for the Kaohsiung City government to remodel the site from a place of mourning into a memorial celebrating the contributions of women to the economy. The association hoped to raise awareness of gender-related labour issues.

On April 28, 2008 (Workers' Memorial Day), the Kaohsiung City government formally renamed the Twenty-five Ladies' Tomb the Memorial Park for Women Labourers. The city remodelled the site to include a lotus flower shrine, plaques with each victim's name, and a brief introduction on the contributions women labourers have made to Taiwan's economy. Every spring, the Kaohsiung City government Department of Labour hosts an annual service to commemorate the young women, as well as to raise awareness for gender-related labour issues.

== Superstition ==
The 46 passengers who survived were all married men and women, and the 25 who drowned were all single women. According to urban legend, young men's cars stall or break down in front of the memorial due to the drowned women feeling lonely and seeking revenge. According to another legend, a young woman in a white dress can be seen walking the area at night. Frequent drownings at the Cijin beach are often blamed on the spirits of the victims. These superstitions led gamblers to visit the tomb in search of winning numbers. If they lost, the gamblers sought revenge by destroying the photos of the women placed on their headstones.

The families of the women deny these superstitions and feel they disparage the names of the victims. The superstitions were a primary catalyst in the advocacy by feminists and KAPWR for the Kaohsiung City government to take action in order to restore dignity to the memory of the victims.

== Transportation ==
- From the ferry station, take the bus to Kaohsiung Municipal Cijin Junior School, then walk Cijin third road and continue walking north for about 10 minutes.
- From Kaohsiung Port tunnel, continue driving north on Cijin third road for 10-15 minutes. The park is on the right.

== See also ==
- http://homepage.ntu.edu.tw/~anthro/download/journal/75-3.pdf
- https://gb468.com/%E5%A4%96%E9%80%81%E8%8C%B6/%E5%8F%B0%E5%8C%97%E5%A4%96%E9%80%81%E8%8C%B6/
