= Yu Mi-chien =

Taiwanese politician

- 游彌堅
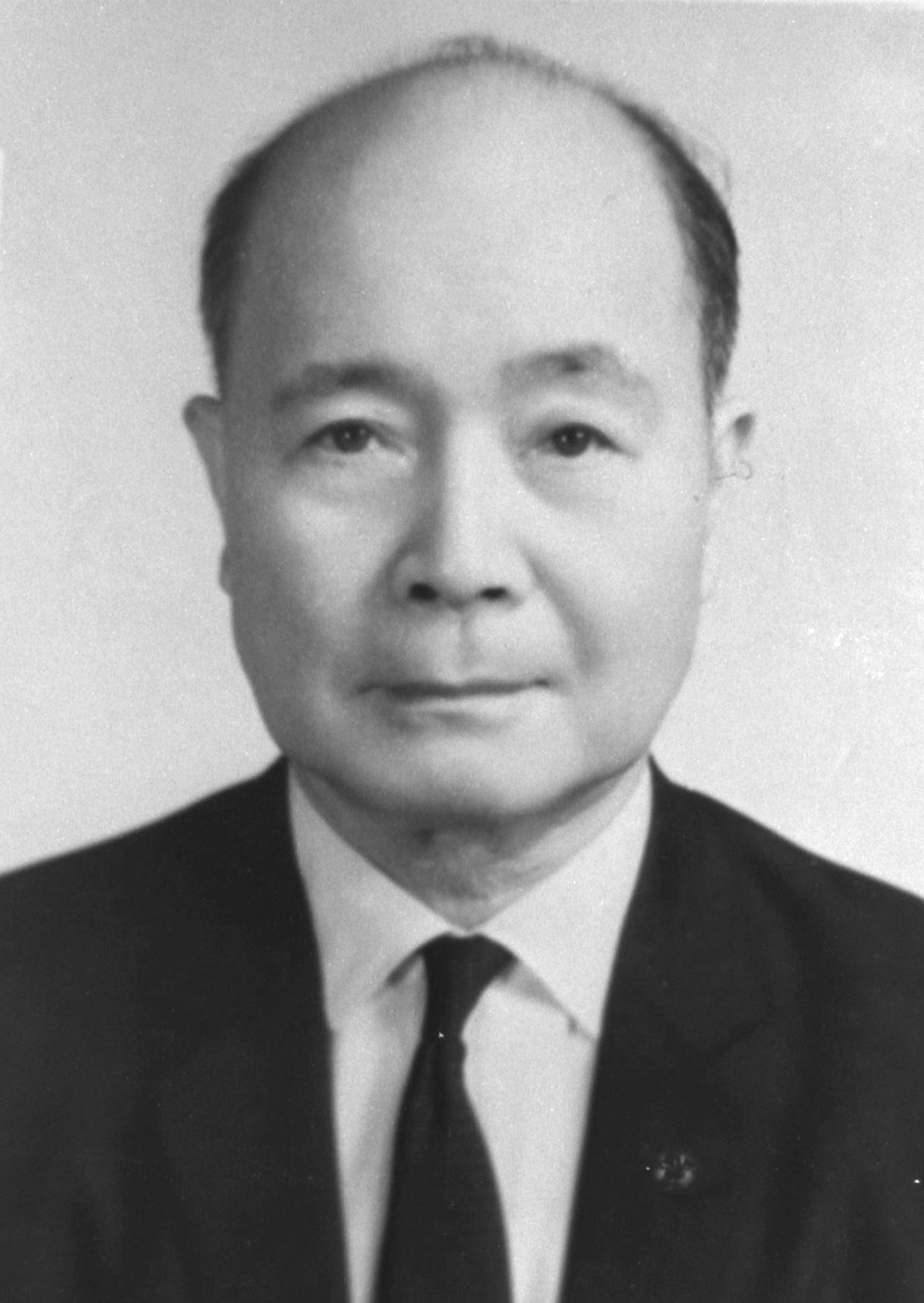

Mayor of Taipei
- In office 1 March 1946 – 6 February 1950
- Preceded by: Huang Chao-chin
- Succeeded by: Wu San-lien

Personal details
- Born: 21 October 1897 Wanchai Village, Taipeh Prefecture, Taiwan, Japan
- Died: 12 December 1971 (aged 74) Taipei, Taiwan
- Education: Nihon University (BEc); Sciences Po

Yu Mi-chien (Chinese: 游彌堅; October 21, 1897 – December 12, 1971), originally known as Yu Bai, was a Taiwanese politician and member of the Kuomintang. Born in Wanchai Village in present-day Neihu District, Taipei City (then under Japanese rule), he served as mayor of Taipei.

== Early life and education ==
Yu Mi-chien was born Yu Bai on October 21, 1897. He came from a family with a long lineage in Taiwan, who traced their roots to Zhao'an County, Fujian Province. Growing up in Wanchai Village, Taipei, he was the sixth-generation descendant in Taiwan. His family was primarily engaged in agriculture. His father, Yu Shih-neng, ran a grocery store, while his mother, Lin Chou, was from a scholarly family in Nangang.

At 13, Yu Mi-chien attended Songshan Public School. He pursued further studies at Taiwan Governor's Mandarin School and later trained as a disciplinarian, teaching at various schools before being promoted to Chengde College. At age 27, he went to Japan to study political economics at Nihon University and later studied at Sciences Po in Paris, gaining exposure to political and economic theory.

== Career ==
=== Early career and diplomatic service (1927–1945) ===
In 1927, Yu moved to Peking, working initially in a printing factory and later as a teacher in Nanjing. Introduced to the Kuomintang by the military scientist Jiang Baili, Yu became a political instructor at the Central Military Academy. In 1932, he served as Wellington Koo’s secretary, gaining experience at the French Embassy and studying at the University of Paris. Following a successful diplomatic stint, he returned to China, where he worked in finance and education in Hunan Province, implementing tax reforms that greatly increased revenue.

=== Return to Taiwan and political roles (1945–1950) ===
After Taiwan’s recovery in 1945, Yu was appointed as the financial commissioner and became the Mayor of Taipei. He used his position to acquire and repurpose Japanese assets. He promoted cultural initiatives such as the founding of Taiwan Oriental Publishing House and the Taiwan Cultural Association.

=== Later career (1950–1971) ===
Following his resignation as mayor in 1950, Yu Mi-chien continued to influence Taiwan's economy and culture. He served as a professor at National Taiwan University, chairman of the Taiwan Paper Industry, and held roles in organizations such as Mandarin Daily News and Taiwan Tourism Association, earning him the title "Father of Taiwan’s Tourism Industry."

== Family ==
His second wife, Wang Shu-min, raised his eldest son Bing-mao (born to his first wife), and bore sons Ching-hsi, Chung-hsi, and Fu-hsi.

== Death ==
Yu Mi-chien died on December 12, 1971, in Taipei.
