= Li Zikuan =

Chinese politician and Buddhist layman (1882–1973)

Li Jihong (traditional Chinese: 李基鴻; simplified Chinese: 李基鸿; pinyin: Lǐ Jīhóng; Wade–Giles: Li Chi-hung; better known by his courtesy name Zikuan (traditional Chinese: 李子寬; simplified Chinese: 李子宽; pinyin: Zǐkūan; Wade–Giles: Tzu-kuan); Dharma name Lekong (Chinese: 了空; pinyin: Lekōng; Wade–Giles: Le-kung); 29 August 1882 - 7 September 1973), was a Chinese revolutionary, politician, and Buddhist layman. A disciple of Taixu, he played an important role in the Buddhist Association of the Republic of China.

== Early life ==
Li was born into a scholarly family in Yingcheng, Hubei, in 1882. His great-grandfather Ying Gong (膺公) was a scholar-official during the reign of the Daoguang Emperor. His grandfather Li Guolin (李國霖) and his father Li Anwen (李安文) were both scholars. Because his uncle Li Anbang (李安邦) had no children, Li was adopted by his uncle when he was young. At the age of six, he was initiated by his biological father into reading the Four Books and Five Classics. When he was 13 years old, his biological father died, and he was taught the eight-legged essay by his great-uncle Li Shifan (李世藩). He became a scholar at the age of 21, and then went to Japan to study at Hosei University, where he studied for three years and joined the Tongmenghui. After returning to China in 1905, he participated in anti-Qing movements in Hubei. In 1911, after the Wuchang Uprising, he served as counselor to the Governor's Office of the Hubei Army.

== Career ==
After the Republic of China was established in 1912, Li went to Shanghai to welcome Sun Wen on his visit to Hubei and participated in the founding of the Kuomintang. In 1914, following the Second Revolution, which saw Sun exiled to Japan and the Kuomintang dissolved, Li went to Shanghai, served as editor of Maritime News Agency (海上通訊社), and participated in anti-Yuan Shikai activities. In 1917, Sun launched the Constitutional Protection Movement from his base of power in Guangzhou. In 1918, Jiang Zuobin invited Zhang Binglin and Taixu to give lectures in Shanghai. Li attended these lectures and became interested in Buddhism. In the same year, Li went to Guangzhou and served as the secretary for Xu Chongzhi. In 1925, Xu was appointed chairman of the Guangdong Provincial Government, and Li was appointed director of the Guangdong Payroll Administration. In August, Liao Zhongkai was assassinated, and Li succeeded him as director of the Finance Department of the Guangdong Provincial Government. Chiang Kai-shek later removed Xu from power, and Xu left for the Shanghai Concession.

In 1926, when the National Revolutionary Army launched the Northern Expedition, Chiang Kai-shek appointed Jiang Zuobin as Hubei Provincial Envoy and Li as director of the Political Department. After the National Revolutionary Army captured Wuhan, Li served as director of the Finance Department of the Hubei Provincial Government. In 1927, Li served as director of the Finance Department of the Fujian Provincial Government. He was recalled to Nanjing in 1928 and served as director of the Finance Bureau of the Nanjing Municipal Government. In 1929, Li returned to the position of director of the Finance Department of Hubei. Taixu was giving lectures in Hankou at this time. Li went to listen to the lectures every day and became a disciple of the Three Treasures. In addition, he was also elected as the president of the Hankou Buddhist Orthodox Association and assisted Taixu in rebuilding the Wuchang Institute of Buddhist Studies. In 1930, the Hubei Provincial Government was reorganized, and Li served as Hubei Provincial Commissioner for Finance, Director of Hubei Transport and Anti-smuggling, and concurrently as Henan Provincial Commissioner for Finance and Director of Henan Salt Affairs. Taixu founded the Sino-Tibetan Theological Academy in Sichuan, with Li as one of the directors. In 1931, Li was transferred to the Nationalist government's Ministry of Finance. In 1932, he served as Secretary-General of China's Anti-Smoking Bureau and promoted the ban on opium.

In 1937, when Second Sino-Japanese War broke out, Li went to Guangdong to serve as the anti-smoking commissioner. In 1938, Li moved along with the Nationalist government to Chongqing. The Nationalist government then appointed him, Lobsang Pelden Tenpe Dronme, and Taixu as executive directors of the Buddhist Association of the Republic of China. In 1940, Li served as deputy director of the Government Affairs Office of the Party and Government Work Assessment Committee of the Supreme Council of National Defense. After the end of the war with Japan, in 1946, the Nationalist government relocated its capital back to Nanjing. Li returned to Hubei and was elected as a representative of the Yingcheng County National Assembly.

== Later years ==
In 1948, due to the Chinese Civil War, Li left for Taiwan and obtained ownership of the Shandao Temple in Taipei and coordinated the departure of the public service and military units that had occupied the temple. He hoped to use it as a base to continue Taixu's preaching career.

In July 1949, due to disputes among Buddhist factions, someone reported that there were spies lurking in the Taiwan Buddhist academy established by Cihang. More than 30 Buddhist monks who came to Taiwan from mainland China, including Cihang and Hsing Yun, were arrested. Li later arranged for them to be released. In order to protect Buddhist monks, Li reestablished the Buddhist Association of the Republic of China in Taiwan after discussions with Bai Sheng, Dongchu and others. Lobsang Pelden Tenpe Dronme served as its chairman.

Shortly before his 91st birthday, Li was hospitalized for abdominal pain. He contracted pneumonia and died in Taipei on 7 September 1973.
