= Adelaida Martínez Aguilar =

Mexican writer and poet

- Born: 16 December 1870; Santiago Ixcuintla
- Died: Unknown; Tepic
- Occupation: Teacher

Adelaida Martínez Aguilar (16 December 1870 — ?) was a Mexican teacher, writer, and poet active in the Tepic Territory from the 1860s until her death. In her 1910 book Mujeres Notables Mexicanas, Laureana Wright de Kleinhans wrote a short biography of Aguilar and provided one of her poems written for a local newspaper under alias.

== Biography ==
Adelaida Martínez Aguilar was born in Santiago Ixcuintla, to Colonel Agatón Martinez and Adelaide Aguilar. Aguilar was orphaned at age three when her mother died and father left for work, thus entering the care of her stepmother, Lugarda Sandoval. Sandoval was no teacher herself, so Aguilar was sent to study at Rosa Navarro's school in Guadalajara, Jalisco province, where she would spend six years studying and graduated in 1886 and herself became a teacher. Family matters brought her back to her home town, and there she dedicated herself to education and giving piano lessons. From 1893, and under the pseudonym Celia, Aguilar wrote poetry for the local newspaper, El Phonograph. She died in Tepic Territory. Her date of death is unknown.

== See also ==
- Rosa Espinoza
- Paula Navarro
- Solón Argüello
