= Nan Jeon University of Science and Technology =

Private university in Yanshui, Tainan, Taiwan

- 南榮科技大學
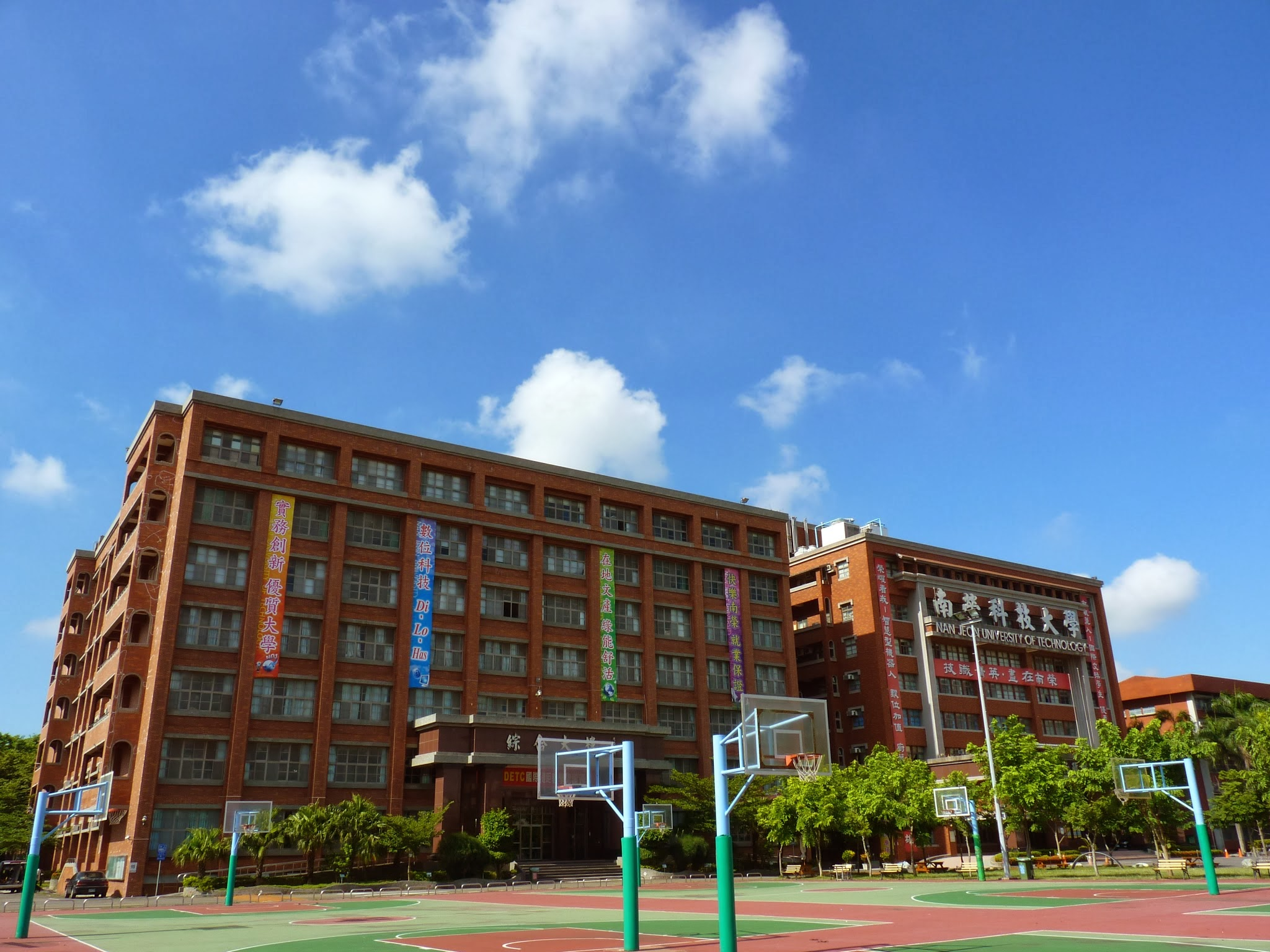
- Type: Private
- Active: 30 June 1967 (as Nan Jeon Junior College of Technology); 2013 (as Nan Jeon University of Science and Technology)–1 February 2020
- Location: Yanshuei, Tainan, Taiwan; 23°19′27″N 120°16′30.6″E
- Website: Official website (in Chinese)

Nan Jeon University of Science and Technology
- Traditional Chinese: 南榮科技大學
Transcriptions
Standard Mandarin
- Hanyu Pinyin: Nánróng Kējì Dàxué

Nan Jeon University of Science and Technology (NJU; traditional Chinese: 南榮科技大學; simplified Chinese: 南荣科技大学) was a private university in Yanshuei District, Tainan, Taiwan.

NJU offers undergraduate programs in fields such as Mechanical Engineering, Electrical Engineering, Chemical Engineering, Information Management, Business Administration, and Hospitality Management. It also offers graduate programs in fields such as Mechanical Engineering, Electrical Engineering, Chemical Engineering, Information Management, and Business Administration.

== History ==
The school was originally established as Nan Jeon Junior College of Technology on 30 June 1967. In 1993, the school was promoted to be Nan Jeon Junior College of Technology and Commerce and to Nan Jeon Institute of Technology in 2001. Finally, in 2013 it became Nan Jeon University of Science and Technology. The university closed down on 1 February 2020.

== Campus ==
The university occupied an area of 9.02 hectares with a total floor space of 7.21 hectares.

== Faculties ==
- Group of Business and Management
- Group of Engineering
- Group of Humanities and Social Science

== Transportation ==
The university was accessible by car within less than 40 minutes from Xinying Station of Taiwan Railway.

== See also ==
- List of universities in Taiwan
