= Hsieh Che-ching =

Taiwanese cultural/art history expert, broadcaster and travel writer

- 謝哲青
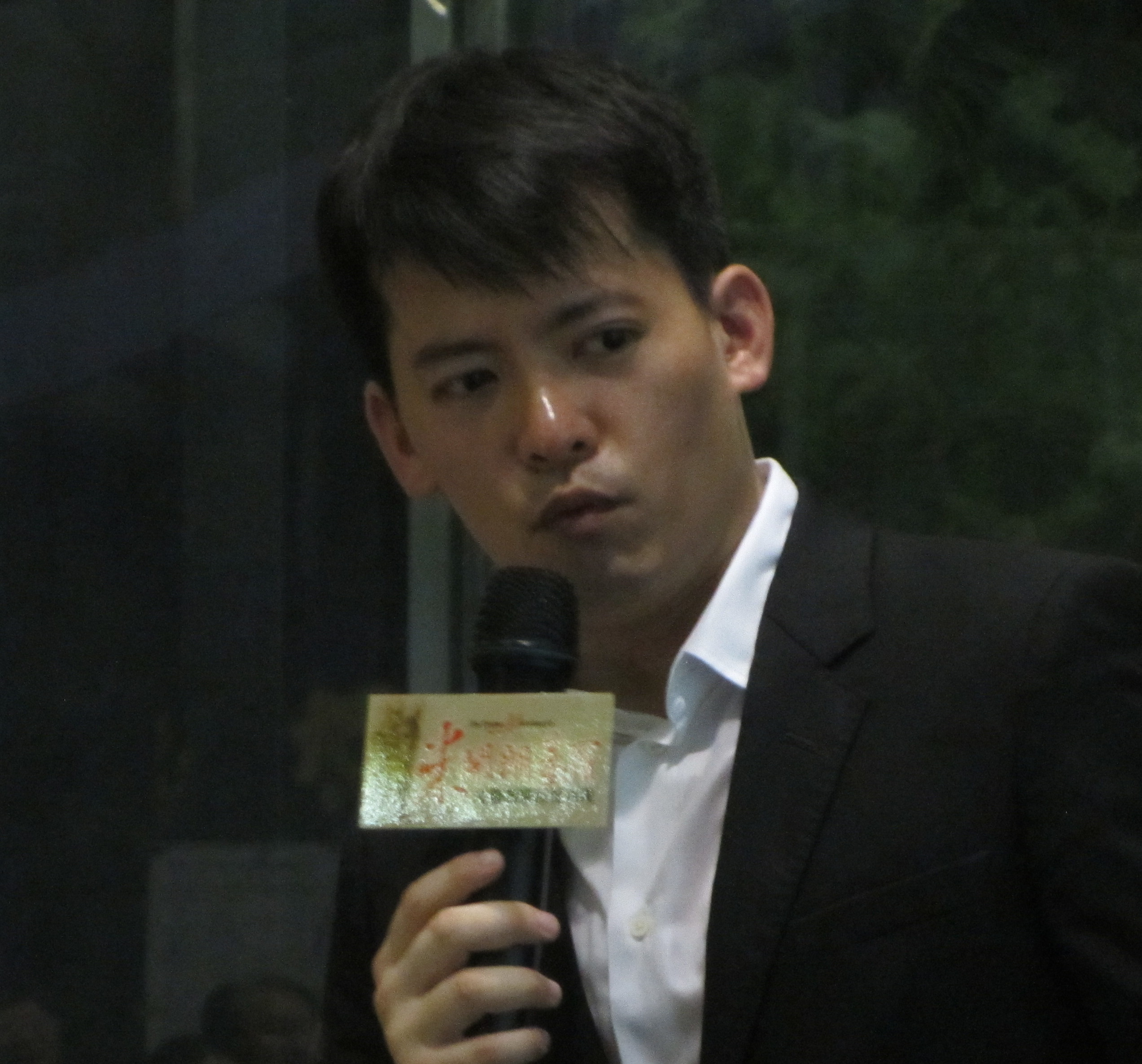
- Born: 18 November 1974 (age 51); Hualien County, Taiwan
- Education: SOAS University of London (BA, MA)
- Occupations: Historian, broadcaster, writer

Hsieh Che-ching (Chinese: 謝哲青; born 18 November 1973) is a Taiwanese cultural/art history expert, broadcaster and travel writer.

== Life ==
Hsieh Che-ching was born in Hualien, grew up and studied in Kaohsiung, and now lives in Taipei. He has a BA degree in history and a master's degree from the Department of the History of Art and Archaeology at SOAS. He can speak Chinese, Japanese, English, Italian, and Latin.

Hsieh Che-ching has led mountaineering groups for the tourist industry and has traveled in 86 countries. He has travelled to Everest in the Himalayas, Puncak Jaya in Indonesia, and Mazha Luo Shan in Kenya, east Africa, as well as around the world by ship. His cultural connections include the British Museum, National Gallery in London, and Christie's auction house. Xie's main interest is in cultural history and art history.

His book "Blue Women Reading Letters" in the "European Love Letter" ( <歐遊情書>) was selected as the "Mandarin" text for the fifth grade of the National Primary School and "On the Road to Dreams" for the 2015 Top 100 High School in Taiwan. The book "Banknotes Writing Romance" (鈔寫浪漫) won the Golden Ding Award for excellent publications. He has presided over "UFO Dinner – Xie Zhuangqing Time" and "WTO Sisters", and serves as the host of "Youth Love Reading". The program won the 51st Golden Bell Awards "Best Educational Culture Program Award".

== Television and radio broadcasting ==
- ETTV — "Critical moment", guest
- Azio TV — "Dongfeng knowledge", host
- UFO Radio — "Green travel the world philosophy", host
