= Sansan Chien =

American classical composer

- 簡郁珊
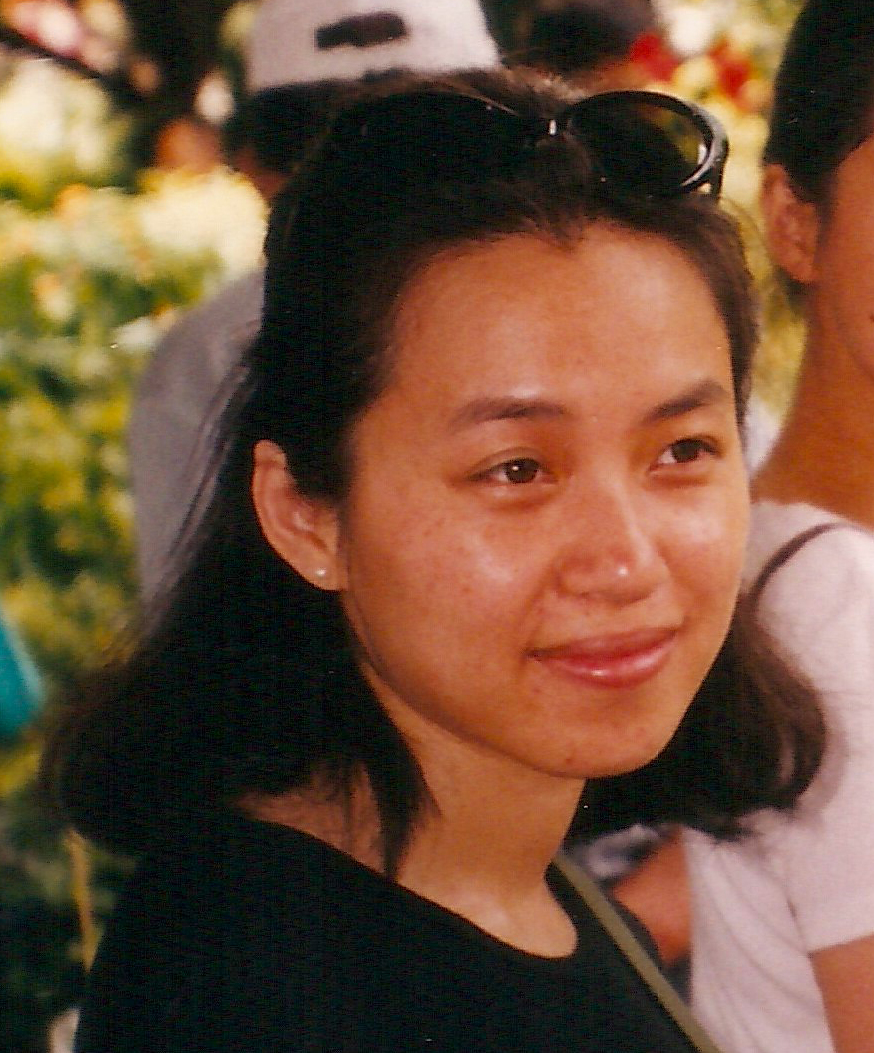
- Born: 1 July 1967; Changhua, Taiwan
- Died: 24 October 2011 (aged 44); Kaohsiung, Taiwan
- Education: University of Toledo (BMus); Ohio University (MMus); Indiana University Bloomington (DMus)
- Occupation: Composer
- Spouse: Paul San Gregory

Sansan Chien (Chinese: 簡郁珊; pinyin: Jiǎn Yùshān; 1 July 1967 – 24 October 2011) was a Taiwanese composer of contemporary classical music. Chien was well known in Taiwan for her teaching of music theory and composition.

== Early life and education ==
She was born on 1 July 1967 in Changhua, Taiwan, and grew up in Taichung. When she was fifteen, her family moved to the United States and settled in Sylvania, Ohio, where she completed her high school education. She then earned a Bachelor of Music degree in piano performance from the University of Toledo Department of Music (1989), a master's degree in music composition from the Ohio University School of Music (1991), and a Doctor of Music degree in music composition from the Jacobs School of Music at Indiana University Bloomington (1997).

== Career ==
Chien was a full-time assistant professor of music theory and composition at the Department of Music at National Kaohsiung Normal University from 1997 to 2011. Previously, she was a part-time instructor of music composition at The University of Indianapolis and an associate instructor of music composition and related courses at Indiana University Jacobs School of Music. She was much appreciated by the many students she taught, especially those at National Kaohsiung Normal University. She was also instrumental in organizing the music curriculum at NKNU and dramatically improving the quality of music theory and composition instruction there. Together with her husband, Paul San Gregory, a composer and professor of music, they created an intense and encouraging learning environment that has benefited many NKNU graduates. For many years, they also founded and directed the Contemporary Chamber Ensemble at NKNU, the only university-run new music ensemble in Taiwan at the time.

== Personal life and death ==
During her studies at Indiana University, she became a naturalized US citizen while retaining her ROC (Taiwan) citizenship.

On 24 October 2011, Chein died at the age of 44 in Chang Geng Memorial Hospital, Kaohsiung, Taiwan, following a difficult struggle with cancer.
