= Juan Carlos Zorzi =

Argentine musician

Juan Carlos Zorzi (November 11, 1935 – August 21, 1999) was an Argentine musician, composer, and orchestra director.

His teachers were Gilardo Gilardi, Alberto Ginastera, Floro Ugarte, and Juan Giaccobbe, and he was instructed in conducting by Mariano Drago.

Juan Carlos Zorzi has been the principal director of the Symphony Orchestra of the National University of Cuyo, the Symphony Orchestra of Cordoba, the Symphony Orchestra of the University of Tucuman, and the National Symphony and Philharmonic of Chile.

He served as Resident Director of the Philharmonic Orchestra of Bogota for two consecutive seasons and was the Provincial Director of the Rosario Symphony Orchestra from 1977 to 1990. In 1999, Zorzi received the Konex Award for being considered one of the five best conductors in the history of Argentina. He died at the age of 63 as a result of esophageal cancer.

== Works ==
His catalog of works includes the following:

- El timbre, an opera
- Antígona Vélez, an opera
- Don Juan, an opera; premiered at the Teatro Colón
- Adagio for viola and orchestra
- Concerto for viola and string orchestra (1979)
- Adagio elegíaco in Memory of Gilardo Gilardi
- Variaciones enigmáticas
- Ludus, for six instrumental groups
- Piano Quintet
- Sonata for violin and piano
