= Huang Chao-chin =

Taiwanese diplomat and politician

- Huang in 1969

Speaker of the Taiwan Provincial Assembly
- In office 1946–1963
- Preceded by: Position established
- Succeeded by: Hsieh Tung-min

Mayor of Taipei
- In office November 1, 1945 – March 1, 1946
- Preceded by: Position established
- Succeeded by: Yu Mi-chien

Chairman of the First Bank of Taiwan
- In office 1947–Unknown

Personal details
- Born: October 25, 1897 Yanshui Port, Chiayi County, Japanese Taiwan
- Died: July 5, 1972 (aged 74)
- Party: Kuomintang
- Education: Waseda University (BEc); University of Illinois Urbana-Champaign (MA)
- Profession: Diplomat

Huang Chao-chin (黃朝琴, Taiwanese: N̂g Tiâu-khîm, October 25, 1897 – July 5, 1972), known by the courtesy name Lan-ting and pen name Chao Jin or Nien-tai, was a Taiwanese diplomat and politician. Born in Yanshui Port, Chiayi County, Taiwan under Japanese rule (now Yanshuei District, Tainan), he pursued his early education in Japan and later studied public international law in the United States. Upon completion of his studies, he went to the Republic of China to serve in the Ministry of Foreign Affairs of the Nationalist government. He held various positions including Provincial Speaker and member of the Central Committee of the Kuomintang, and presided over the Taiwan Provincial Assembly for nearly two decades.

== Early life and education ==
Huang Chao-chin was born on October 25, 1897, in Yanshui Port, Chiayi County, Japanese Taiwan. After the death of his grandfather and father when he was ten years old, his mother, Cai, raised him and his younger siblings. In 1914, he graduated from a public school in Yanshui Port (today's Tainan Yanshui Elementary School). He later studied business at Changhua Public School, but dropped out in the second grade to manage the family property and his father's business.

In 1917, Huang Chao-chin moved to Tokyo, Japan, where he lived in a "lower dormitory" and pursued his studies. He was admitted to the third grade of Nihon Junior High School (today's Nihon Gakuen Junior High School and High School), and his younger brother transferred to the second grade of the school.

In 1920, he studied economics at Waseda University in Japan. During this period, he co-founded the "Taiwan Minbao" with his friends. In 1923, he published "On the Reform of Chinese Language," advocating the popularization of written vernacular Chinese. Huang Chao-chin then went to the United States to study political science at the University of Illinois Urbana-Champaign.

== Career ==
In 1925, he joined the Kuomintang and obtained a Master's degree in political science the following year. Later, he went to the Republic of China. In 1928, he joined the Overseas Chinese Affairs Bureau of the Ministry of Foreign Affairs of the Republic of China. He served successively as a staff member, section chief of the Asia Department, and consul general in San Francisco and Calcutta. In 1938, while serving as the Consul General in San Francisco, he handled the "Guangyuan Ship Case." It was verified that more than 2,000 tons of scrap iron were on the ship to Japan. Huang Chao-chin suspected it was used to make arms for the Second Sino-Japanese War, so he refused to issue a certificate. Later, the ship's owner planned to withdraw the application for a nationality certificate, change the hands of the boat, and try to find another nationality. Huang Nai issued the certificate but has not delivered it yet, so the ship can still not leave the port.

In 1945, he served as mayor of Taipei and as a special foreign affairs commissioner. He concurrently served as Taipei City's mayor, becoming Taipei's first mayor after the war.

In 1947, he became the chairman of the First Bank of Taiwan. He successively served as the managing director of the Bank of Taiwan, the plenipotentiary representative of the Republic of China at the Fifth United Nations General Assembly, and other essential positions. During the February 28 incident, he served as the leader of the Liaison Group of the Taipei February 28 Incident Handling Committee. In historical research, Huang Chao-chin is considered to be used by the Kuomintang to "use Taiwan to contain Taiwan."

In 1963, Huang Chao-chin retired from the Provincial Council and invested in the Guobin Hotel. According to Wu Chuo-liu's "Taiwan Forsythia," Huang Chao-chin initially stated his intention to build a "Liu Mingchuan Memorial Hall" on the Tianli Jiao site on Zhongshan North Road. After acquiring the land, he secured a substantial loan from the Bank of Taiwan to purchase building materials during a period of inflation. He then used his position in the Office of the President of Taiwan to repurpose the iron bars used in renovating the presidential palace to construct a dormitory for William C. Chase, the head of the US Military Assistance Advisory Group. After the dormitory was completed, part of the remaining building materials were sold to repay the loan from the Taiwan Bank. After General Chase left office and returned, the dormitories were demolished. The Guobin Hotel was subsequently built on the site. After retirement, Huang Chao-chin held several positions including the managing director of the Bank of Taiwan, chairman of the Industrial and Commercial Bank of China, and agent for the Taiwan sales rights of British Asia Oil.

In 1967, Huang Chao-chin erected a monument for the Yanyan Port Public School principal, Sen Rong, to express his gratitude.

Huang Chao-chin died from liver cancer on July 5, 1972, at the age of seventy-six. On the same day, the Taiwan Provincial Council decided to fly the flag at half-mast for three days to honor Huang Chao-chin.

== Publications ==
Huang Chao-chin's works include:

- "Taiwan under Japanese Rule" (English version, unpublished)
- "The Development of the Chinese Nation Overseas"
- "Guangyuan Lun Case" (Chinese and English)
- "My Memories": Memoirs, edited by Wang Shao-chai and published by Huang Chen Yin-lien in December 1981; renamed "Huang Chao-chin's Memoirs" when serialized in "China and Foreign Magazine" (March 1982 – November 1983); published by Longwen Publishing House in 1989 Published on June 15, the title of the book is still "My Memories". When it was republished on May 1, 2001, it was renamed "Memoirs of Chao-chin: Taiwan's Political and Business Leaders".

== Legacy ==
After Huang Chao-chin's death, the local "Dongmen Road" in Yanshui was renamed "Chao-chin Road" in his honor. Taiwan Provincial Consultative Council in the Democratic Deliberation Park of the Legislative Yuan was built in April 1963, when the Sixth Extraordinary Session of the Second Provincial Congress was held. Since the then Speaker Huang Chao-chin had decided not to run for election, provincial councilors Hsu Shih-hsien, Hsieh Tung-min, Liang Hsu Chun-chu, Lee Chien-ho, and Kuo Yu-hsin co-sponsored the proposal, arguing that since the establishment of the Provincial Senate, it has been 17 years since the Provisional Provincial Council was transformed into the Provincial Council. Huang Chao-chin has always remained in his position as the speaker and has contributed significantly to leading the forum. The Provincial Council has been relocated to Wu. Feng built the new site, drew up the design, and worked hard. To respect the achievements of Speaker Huang Chao-chin, it was proposed that a building of the Provincial Council be used as a permanent memorial. Since the Provincial Council was building a library at that time, it was decided to name the library " Chao-chin Library." in December 1963, the first speaker of the Provincial Council, Huang Chao-chin, and the then speaker Hsieh Tung-min presided over the ribbon-cutting and opening ceremony. After Huang died in 1973, given his outstanding contribution to Taiwan's democratization and establishment of the political system, the name was changed to "Chao-chin Memorial Hall." Huang Chao-chin served in the Taiwan Provincial Senate and the Provisional Provincial Assembly of Taiwan Province since 1946 and as the Speaker of the 1st and 2nd Taiwan Provincial Assembly for five terms. Until he bid farewell to the parliament in 1963, he presided over the affairs of the parliament for 17 years. Years long. On January 28, 1973, the Provincial Council erected a statue on the lawn on the right side in front of the parliament building to express gratitude for his outstanding contributions to establishing the Provincial Council's parliamentary system and the planning and construction of Wufeng Park. The statue was made by the well-known sculptor Pu Tiansheng. The then Vice President Yen Chia-kan wrote an inscription, and Speaker Hsieh Tung-min wrote a commemorative article to commemorate the memory of future generations.

== Reception ==
Shen Lyu-shun stated that the Guangyuan Ship Case is a significant event in modern diplomatic history. It encompasses diplomatic negotiations, court proceedings, the application of international law, and the organization of overseas Chinese affairs. These aspects continue to be relevant in today's diplomatic practice. Despite Japan's blockade of China's coastline, Huang Chao-chin considered requisitioning the ship and urged domestic authorities to counter Japan in this case. "

Former provincial councilor and legislator Kuo Kuo-chi referred to Huang Chao-chin as the successor to Koo Hsien-jung. Lin Shu-kuang noted that Huang Chao-chin aspired to be the governor of Taiwan, but his aspiration was not realized. Wu Zhuoliu, in "Taiwan Forsythia," mentioned that Huang Chao-chin is often compared with Gu Xianrong. Gu Xianrong rose from humble beginnings to become a wealthy individual, while Huang Chao-chin, who returned with only a suit, amassed considerable wealth."

== Recognitions ==
- Order of Brilliant Star, Fourth Class (approved on January 1, 1946)
