= Liu Wei (lieutenant general) =

Chinese lieutenant general (1906–1969)

General Liu Wei
- 劉煒
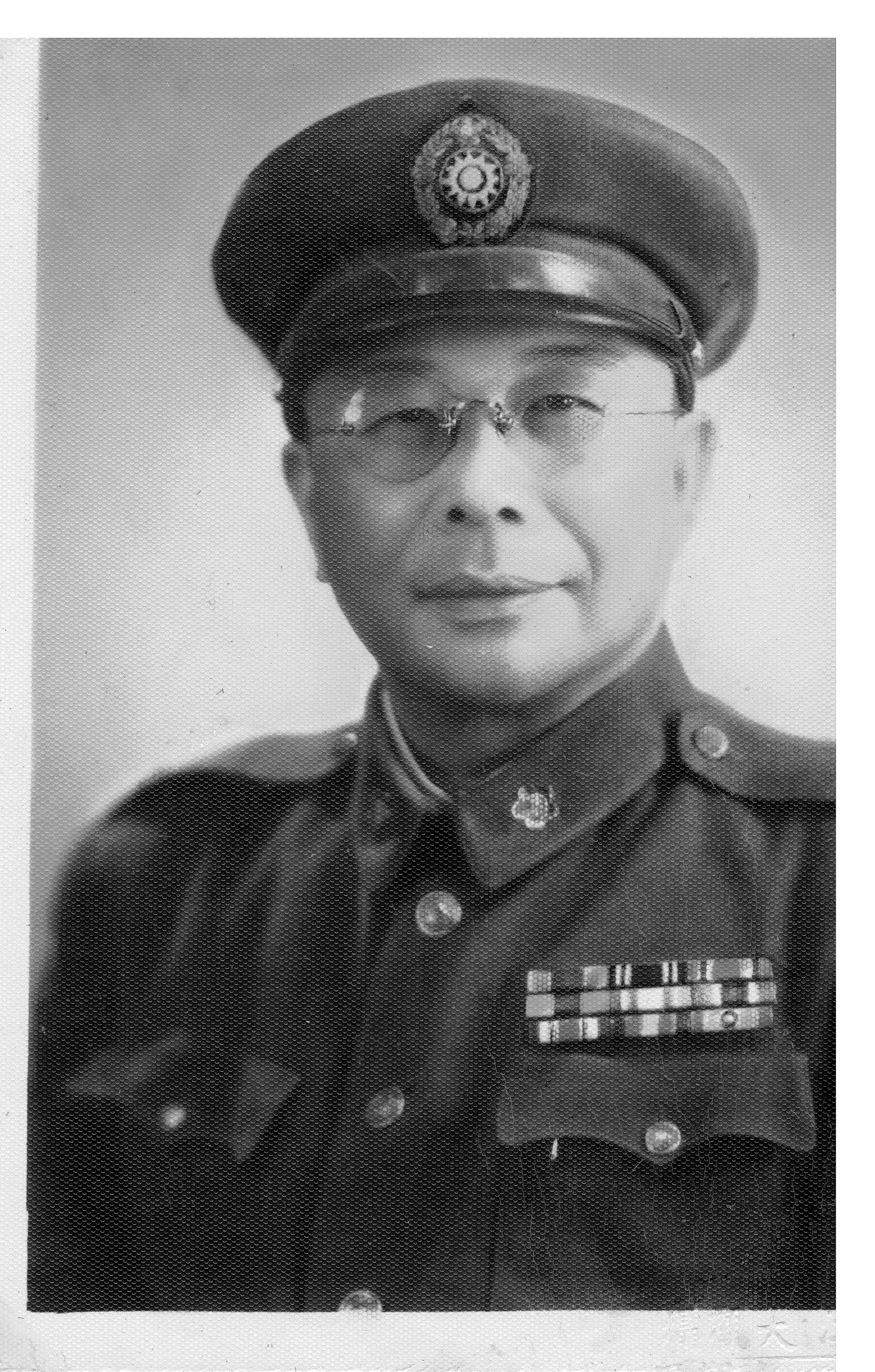
- Born: 4 May 1906; Guangdong, Qing Empire
- Died: 24 June 1969 (aged 63); Taipei, Taiwan
- Burial place: Yangmingshan First Cemetery
- Spouse: Chin Huai Teng
- Military career
- Allegiance: Republic of China
- Branch: Republic of China Military Police
- Rank: Lieutenant General
- Unit: Military Police
- Commands: National Commander
- Awards: Republic of China Military Academy 第四期步科

Liu Wei (pinyin: Liú Wěi; Wade–Giles: Liú Wèi; 4 May 1906 – 24 June 1969) was the commander-in-chief of the Republic of China Military Police (ROCMP) in postwar Taiwan.

== Early life and education ==
Liu Wei，General Liu Wei, also known as Liu Weiwu, a native of Dapu, Guangdong, Qing Empire, was born in April 1906. Liu graduated from Whampoa Military Academy in the fourth phase of the Infantry Division. He studied in the semi-infantry department and the semi-military police department. General Liu was loyal to the leader, and the nation. After graduating from Guangdong Provincial Second High School, he was admitted to Guangdong University. However, at that time, the country was in a chaotic situations created by both warlords and foreign powers. Under these circumstances, he resolutely gave up his university study and enlisted to the Whampoa Military Academy.

Liu dedicated his life to country and rose from platoon leader to company commander and finally commander of the national military police. Liu Wei is one of the representatives of "Lifelong Military Police in China". Throughout his life, he has been responsible for the safety of leaders, safeguarding national public security, implementing military discipline, and maintaining military discipline as his duties. For the suppression of traitors and the investigation of corrupt officials He would not avoid hardships and dangers. He died on 24 June 1969, at National Taiwan University Hospital in Taipei, Taiwan, at the age of sixty-four. He was awarded the "Loyalty and Diligence" Honorable Mention by President Chiang Kai Shek.

== Career ==
Wei retreated to Taiwan with the government of the Republic of China in 1949. Initially he served as the deputy commander of the National Military Police in [year to be added]. He was promoted to lieutenant general in 1952. In 1955, he was promoted to the post of commander-in-chief of the military police.

He was trained at The Republic of China Military Academy, previously known as the Whampoa Military Academy.

== Military attainments ==
- Major General Commander of the Military Police Southeast Region Command, Republic of China
- Deputy Commander of National Military Police, Lieutenant General, Republic of China
- Commander of National Military Police, Lieutenant General, Republic of China
- Lieutenant General Planning Committee, Republic of China

== Early military career ==
Liu served in China's military police corps for 34 years. During the Northern Expedition, Liu followed Chiang Kai-shek and fought against China's warlords in Guangdong, Fujian, Jiangxi, Zhejiang, and various battlefields. He was responsible for the safety of leaders, to protect national public order, to enforce and maintain military discipline. In 1926 when he served as the platoon commander of the 1st Army National Revolutionary Army and in June 1927 he served as the third company commander of the First Army Gendarmerie Battalion. In the Battle of Longtan in August of the same year, Liu with his soldiers actively engaged in the battle and was due to his bravery and accomplishment, Liu was to the rank of major in the army. In September 1927 during the Northern Expedition against the war lords in China, Liu led the military police and actively participated in the victorious Battle of Longtan (龍潭戰役). In 1928, he served as the commander of the sixth company of the second regiment of the military police. In the same year, he received advance training at the Central School of Military Police. In 1935, he served as the lieutenant colonel of the Military Police Command Teaching Corps. In 1936, he was promoted to the Colonel of the Military Police Supplementary Corps and concurrently served as the Academic Affairs Director of the Central School of Military Police. When the Anti-Japanese War broke out, the Chinese Military Police Corps had eight regiments. According to historical materials such as "History of the War of Resistance in China", "Archives of the Republic of China from 1937 to 1938" and "Imperial Army East Asian Operations Archives" partially declassified by Japan in recent years, there were 8 military regiments in that year. The commander of the 3rd Regiment of Military Police Corps was stationed in Peiping, while the 1st Regiment of the Military Police Corps (the commander was Zhang Zhen) and the 5th Regiment of the Military Police Corps (the commander was Liu) were stationed in Nanjing. Both the 1st Regiment and the 5th Regiment fiercely participated in the defense of Nanjing. On December 11, 1937, seeing that Nanjing was about to be encircled and annihilated, Xiao Shanling (蕭山令), deputy commander of the Military Police Corps and acting mayor of Nanjing, gave a decisive order to Liu's 5th Regiment to retreat to the second line of defense after the cotton embankment. Regarding the extent of the military police's participation in the defense of Nanjing, there are different opinions and even some controversies; but it is consensus that the fifth regiment of the military police participated in the battle. At that time, Liu served as the commander of the Fifth Gendarmerie Regiment, responsible for the maintaining of the public security of the capital, Nanjing . At the same time, Liu also served as the head of the wounded management department. He had taken care of more than 100,000 wounded soldiers, allowing them to recuperate and evacuate.。In October 1939, Liu was promoted to the rank of Major General of the National Revolutionary Army. In the winter of the same year, he was appointed a member of the Major General Research Committee. In 1940, he returned to the post as the commander of the fifth regiment of the military police. In the summer of 1944, he was promoted to chief of staff of the military police command. In January 1945, he was appointed the commander of the southeast region of the military police.

== Latter part of military career ==
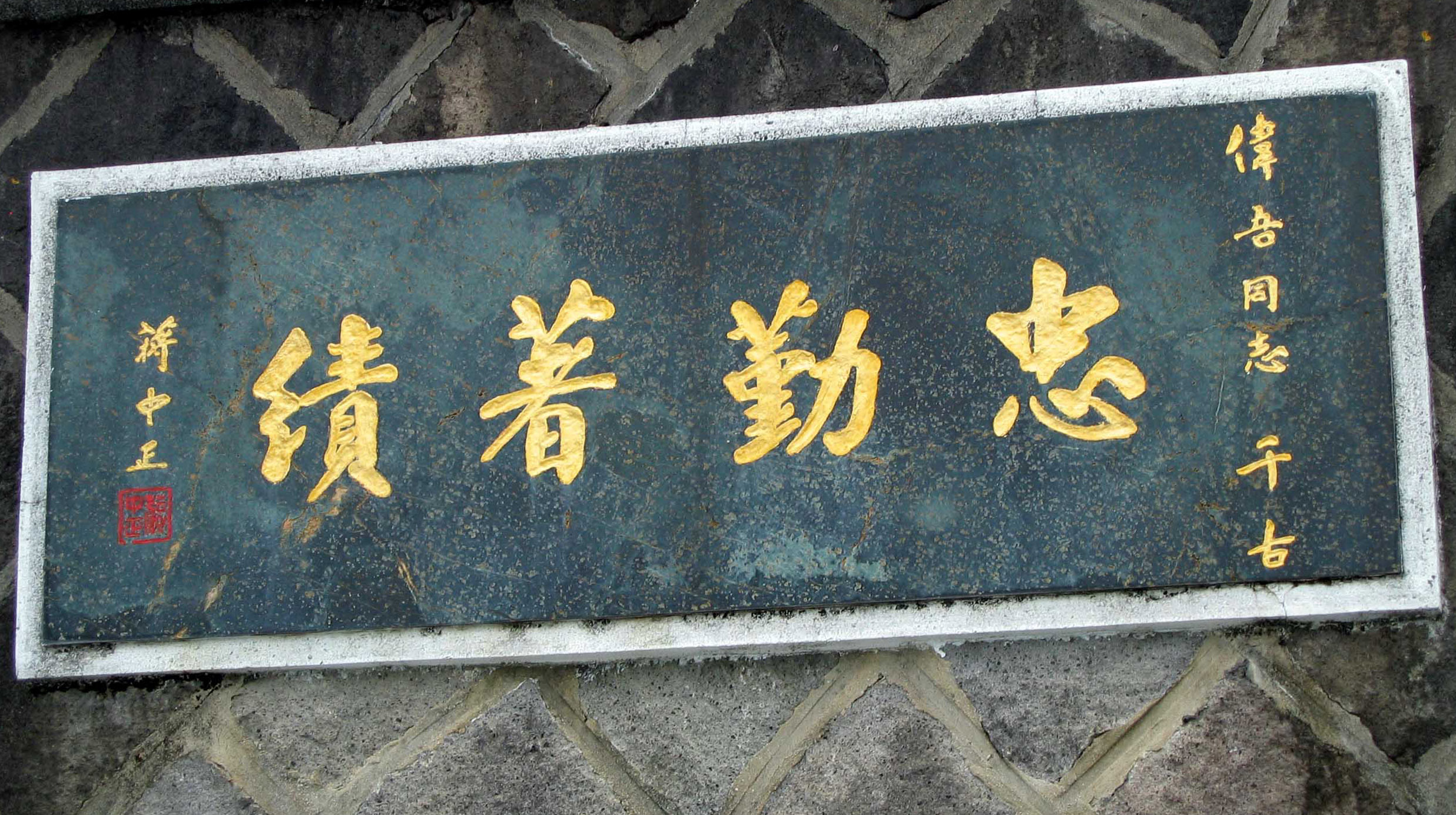
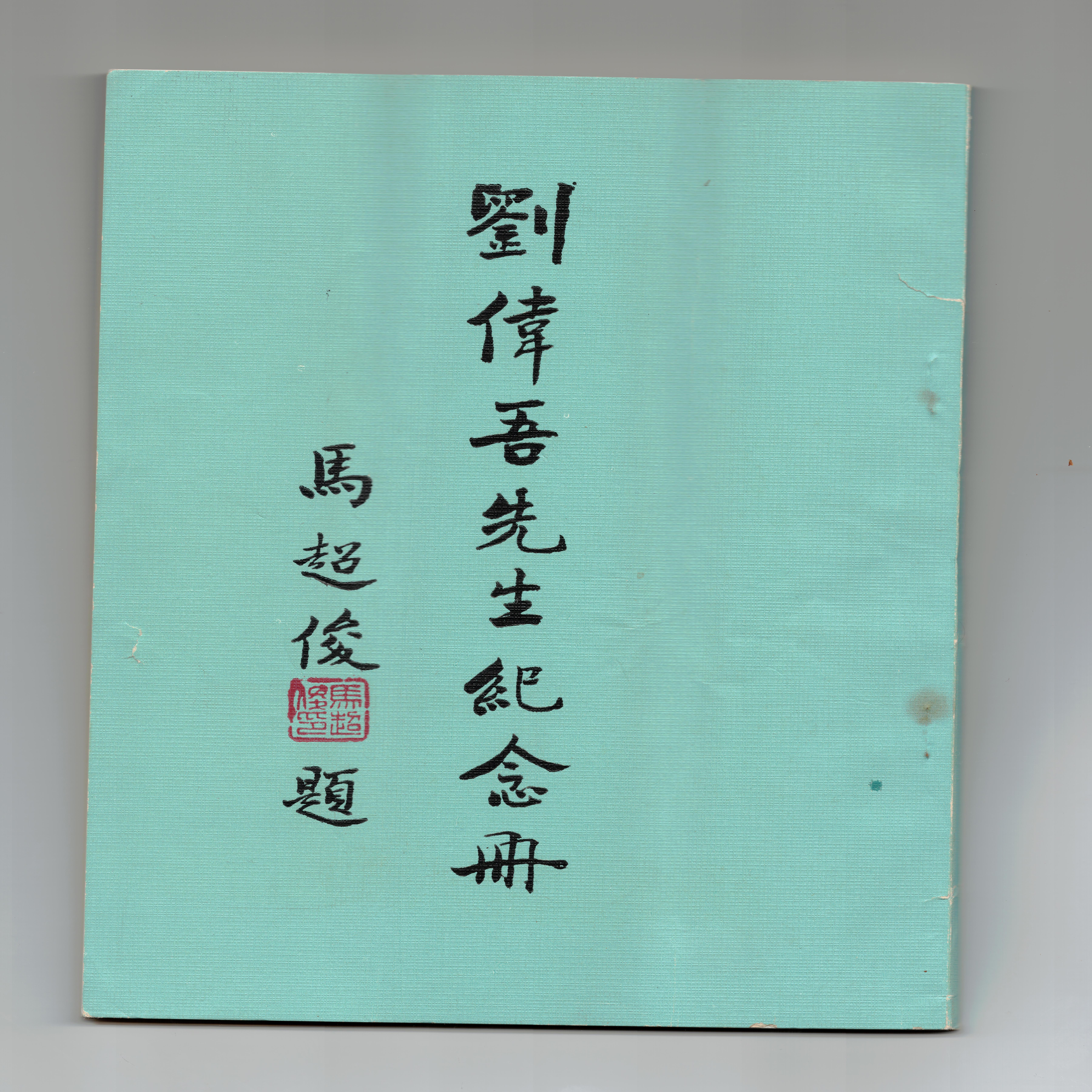

In 1949, Liu followed the KMT government to retreat to Taiwan. There he entered and graduated from the General Class of Army University. In 1950, the Military Police Command was established in Taiwan, and Liu served as the deputy commander. Since General Huang Zhenwu, the commander at the time, was not a military policeman, Liu, the deputy commander of the military police, was practically responsible for a great deal of the reconstruction work of the military police, such as the reorganization of the headquarters, the revision of laws, and the training of troops, the development of duties, etc. Liu throughout this period of reorganization had worked extremely hard without complaints. Because of these, the Military Police Command in Taiwan was able to, in the shortest period of time, restored and resumed the effective functioning of military policing in Taiwan.

On the National Day of 1951, the KMT government in Taiwan decided to hold the Double Ten Military Parade in order to promote the national strength and stabilize the morale of the people in the Republic of China now limited to Taiwan. Liu concurrently served as the command of the parade security. The plan for the deployment of parade secury required task training and safety measures, and the adjustment of troops. All these were personally planned and executed by Liu. Any factors that could affect safety were eliminated in advance with all efforts. Later, the security arrangements related to the National Day parade over the years, regardless of the formation, troop strength, plan, equipment, and related measures, were generally based on the protocol and procedure designed and established by Liu on the National Day of 1951.

In 1952, Liu was promoted to lieutenant general. In September 1955, he was promoted to commander-in-chief of the military police of the Republic of China in Taiwan. During his tenure, the military police department of the army headquarters and the military police group of the military corps were established. Liu also established the service area rotation system and the intermodulation system both of which have been followed to this date.

In 1957, the “May 24 incident” broke out on May 24 during Liu's term as Commander of the Military Police. The “incident” involved the killing of a Chinese officer Liu Tianran by Sergeant Robert Reynolds who belonged to the US Army Advisory Group stationed in Taiwan. The shooting and killing of National Army Major Liu Tianran led to people attacking the US Embassy. Later, President Chiang Kai-shek removed Liu, the commander of the Taipei Guards Huang Zhenwu, and the director of the Taiwan Provincial Police Le Gan to quell the turmoil. The President of the Executive Yuan Yu Hongjun led the cabinet to resign (received a condolence), and Chiang Ching-kuo, the son of President Chiang, was “demoted” and transferred to the chairman of the Employment Guidance Committee for Retired Officers and Soldiers of the National Army. In the case of Liu removal from office, many people spoke out and stated that it are very unfair to Liu. The day after the incident, President Chiang met with Huang Zhenwu, the head of the Garrison Command, Liu, the military police commander, and Peng Mengji, the chief of staff. In the visit records of the president's attendants, Ying Shunren, a guard at the Shilin official residence (士林官邸侍衛人員應舜仁), recalled that President Chiang “heard that Liu and Peng Mengji were pushing the ball against each other about the slowness of dispatching soldiers. Ying Shunren, the guard of the Shilin official residence, was taken aback. Ying Shunren recalled that Liu had tried to dispatch military police as soon as he received the order. There was no time wasted. He seemed to tactfully imply that it was Peng Mengji's order.”

Zeng Zixiang's (曾咨翔) comments in the "Liu Ziran Incident Revisited" written after his in-depth research may be used to draw a fairly objective conclusion about the May 24 incident and the background of Liu's removal. Zeng said, “Integrate the above doubts: mobilizing students, Chiang Ching-kuo's political responsibility and Vice-President Chen Cheng's inaction. It is too far-fetched to claim President Chiang's ignorance of the incident under the authoritarian system. Zeng stated that perhaps it could be explained that the original plan could be just Chiang Ching-kuo's intention to initiate a protest at the U.S. Embassy. Chiang did not expect the incident of to have gotten out of hand and ended up with smashing the embassy. Zeng concluded that although no direct evidence was found, it can be glimpsed through relevant corroboration that Chiang Ching-kuo could well play a key role in planning and organizing the mass protest in the Liu Tianran incident. Zeng concluded that had it not been the case, then, Chiang Ching-kuo would not have been “demoted” and in fact, had stayed from the political core power center albeit temporarily, right after the incident.

In June 1957, Liu was appointed to the design committee of the National Security Bureau [國家安全局]. He died in Taipei on 24 June 1969.
