= Kao Yi-feng =

Taiwanese writer

- Born: September 10, 1973 (age 52); Toufen City, Miaoli County, Taiwan
- Education: Chinese Culture University
- Occupations: Writer, director

Kao Yi-feng (Chinese: 高翊峰; born 10 September 1973) is a Taiwanese novelist, screenwriter and director. His work includes references to Hakka language and Hakka culture.

== Life ==
Kao Yi-feng was born in Miaoli County. Before becoming a writer, he worked as a dancer, a bartender, and as the editor of a fashion magazine. He studied law at university.

His first short story was published in 2002, and in 2003 Kao and seven other authors formed a group called "Novelist Reader", which aimed to promote contemporary literature by stunts like writing on bookshop windows and printing novels on fast food tray paper.

Kao's first novel, Phantom Asylum, came out in 2012. His second book, War of the Bubbles, followed in 2014. It was translated into French in 2017.

In 2016, Kao and the manga artist Ke You-xi attended the Frankfurt Book Fair as part of the Taiwanese delegation.

== Reception ==
In 2012, Unitas Publishing Company named Kao one of the 20 most-anticipated Chinese novelists under 40. He has also won the Wu Chuo-liu Literary Prize and Lin Rung-san Literary Prize.

== Works ==
=== Novels ===
- Imaginary Ship 《幻艙》（Aquarius Publishing 寶瓶，2011）
- War of the Bubbles 《泡沫戰爭》（Aquarius Publishing 寶瓶，2014）
- 2069 《2069》（Thinkingdom Media Group Ltd. 新經典文化，2019）

=== Short story collections ===
- This prison called home 《家，這個牢籠》（Elite Books 爾雅，2002）
- Désincarnation 《肉身蛾》（Aquarius Publishing 寶瓶，2004）
- Running Through the Beautiful Light 《奔馳在美麗的光裡》（Aquarius Publishing 寶瓶，2006）
- Burning Crows 《烏鴉燒》（Aquarius Publishing 寶瓶，2012）

=== TV movie ===
- Pucevuljan 《煙起的地方Pucevuljan》（2017）
