= Dimerco =

Dimerco Express Group
- Company type: Public Listed Company
- Traded as: DIMERCO
- Industry: International Transportation and Logistics
- Founded: 1971
- Headquarters: Taipei, Taiwan
- Key people: Ms. Wendy Chien- Chairman Mr. Jeffrey Shih- CEO, Chief Executive Officer
- Services: Express Logistics
- Revenue: US$ 707.49 million (2023)
- Net income: US$ 32.63 million (2023)
- Total assets: US$ 290.45 million (2023)
- Total equity: US$ 194.23 million (2023)
- Number of employees: 1960 (as of June. 2022)
- Divisions: DFS (Diversified Freight System)
- Website: https://dimerco.com

Dimerco is a Taiwanese freight company.

Established in 1971 in Taiwan, Dimerco's global network includes over 300 service outlets in 64 countries (with over 160 freight forwarding offices and 80 logistics centers).

The name "Dimerco" is an abbreviation for "Diversified Merchandise Corporation".

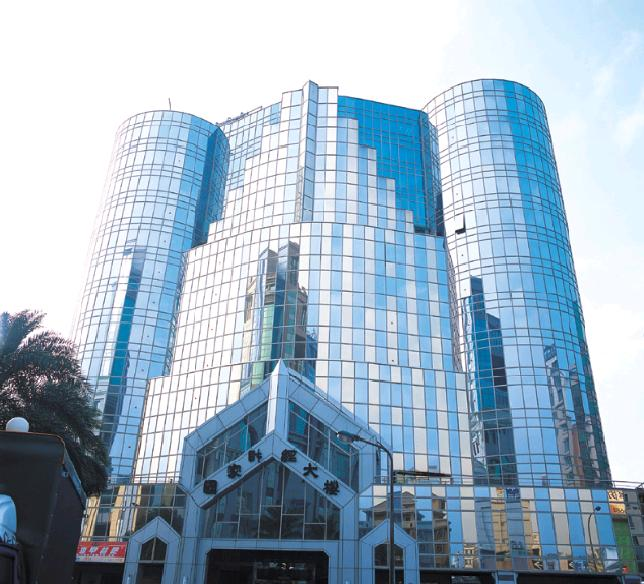
Dimerco's headquarters, in Taiwan

== History ==
Founding and first years 1971-1975

Dimerco was founded on July 15, 1971, in Taipei, Taiwan with a team of 8 people. In 1972 the company was certified as a customs broker and shortly established itself as a Taiwan-based Air Freight Transportation Service Provider with 3 offices.

International Expansion 1976-1983

In 1976, Dimerco opened its first overseas office in New York. Other US offices were opened in Los Angeles, Chicago, San Francisco and Boston; then branches in Hong Kong, Manila and London. In 1980, the Singapore office opened to become the gateway to the Southeast Asia market and brought the number of offices to 16.

Southeast Asian Expansion 1984-1990

Dimerco expanded its presence in Southeast Asia by opening offices in Malaysia, Thailand & Indonesia.

China Focus 1991-1995

During this time, China's 'open-door policy' allowed limited direct foreign investment. In July 1991, Dimerco established its first office in the Shanghai Peace Hotel with the aim of building a strong presence in China. Additional offices were opened in Beijing, Xiamen, Qingdao, Fuzhou, Shenzhen, Tianjin, and Guangzhou, bringing the total to 38.

On October 15, 2001, Dimerco was publicly listed on the Gre Tai Securities Market (now the Taipei Exchange).

New markets were exploited in India, US and Europe. In 2014, Dimerco achieved Top 10 APAC 3PL by air freight volume (Armstrong & Associates).

In 2020, Dimerco and Elanders entered joint venture for air and sea freight forwarding business in the newly founded German subsidiary of Swedish public company Elanders Group, ITG Air & Sea GmbH.

Dimerco exceeded revenue and profit forecasts in 2020, despite the challenges of the global pandemic.

A restructure was instigated putting in place a Leadership Team with decisions made by an Executive Management Board (EMB),

== Services & Operations ==
Dimerco provides door-to-door international freight forwarding services in Asia-Pac countries, North America and Europe.

Freight Forwarding services – air freight, ocean freight, road and rail, China-Europe by rail, cross-border road, multimodal transport, customers brokerage & compliance and cargo insurance.

Contract Logistics – warehousing distribution, bonded warehouse and service logistics.

PO management, data integration, project logistics and supply chain consulting.

Dimerco is International Air Transport Association cargo agent.

== Global Network ==
Dimerco is focused on China, India and ASEAN regions.

== Leadership & Governance ==
With a team leadership structure, decisions are taken by an Executive Management Board (EMB) comprising 5 members responsible for 3 business divisions: air freight, ocean freight and contract logistics.

- Paul Chien, Founder and Chairman
- Jeffrey Shih, Chief Executive Management, EMB
- George Chiou, President Air Freight, EMB
- Wendy Chien, managing director, Contract Logistics, EMB
- Johnny Kao, President Ocean Freight, EMB.
