= Chen Wen-bin =

Taiwanese baseball player

- Outfielder
- Born: 5 October 1973 (age 52); Taiwan
- Bats: Right Throws: Right
- Stats at Baseball Reference

Teams
- Uni-President Lions (1996–1997); Sinon Bulls (1998–2000); Koos Group Whales/Chinatrust Whales (2001–2002); Fukuoka Daiei Hawks (2003); Chinatrust Whales (2004–2006)

Chen Wen-bin (Chinese: 陳文賓; pinyin: Chén Wénbīn; born 5 October 1973 in Taiwan) was a professional baseball player in Japan's Nippon Professional Baseball and Taiwan's Chinese Professional Baseball League.
