= Adelaida Pérez Hung =

Cuban actress, radio announcer and radio writer

Adelaida Pérez Hung is a Cuban actress, radio announcer, and radio writer. She was born in Santiago de Cuba (Cuba) on December 16, 1959.

Pérez Hung studied Philosophy in the former Soviet Union and graduated in 1984. She was a professor at the University of Matanzas and head of Dramatic Programming of the CMKC radio station in Santiago de Cuba. In 1998, she was appraised as an actress and in 2002, she won the Best Female Actress Award in the María Elena Calzado Memorial Festival in Santiago de Cuba. Since 1995, she has acted in many first-place winning programs and has been well received in national radio festivals. She has also won awards for her historical programming scripts in seven national festivals and Mención Especial del Fórum Nacional de Ciencia y Técnica 2001 from the Cuban Institute of Radio and Television.
