= 1988 in Taiwan =

- Decades: 1960s; 1970s; 1980s; 1990s; 2000s
- See also: Other events of 1988; History of Taiwan • Timeline • Years

Events from the year 1988 in Taiwan. This year is numbered Minguo 77 according to the official Republic of China calendar.

== Incumbents ==
- President – Chiang Ching-kuo, Lee Teng-hui
- Vice President – Lee Teng-hui
- Premier – Yu Kuo-hwa
- Vice Premier – Lien Chan, Shih Chi-yang

== Events ==
=== May ===
- 24 May – The 37th Miss Universe pageant at Linkou Stadium in Taipei.

=== June ===
- 12 June – The opening of National Cheng Kung University Hospital in North District, Tainan City.
- 26 June – The opening of National Taiwan Museum of Fine Arts in West District, Taichung City.

=== August ===
- 11 August – The establishment of Federation of Medical Students-Taiwan.

=== December ===
- 29 December – The establishment of Ritek.

== Births ==
- 19 March – Lin Tzu-chi, taekwondo player
- 29 March – Huang Yu-ting, speed skater
- 11 April – Yako Chan, singer and actress
- 19 May – Lin Fei-fan, activist
- 12 June – Nieh Pin-chieh, swimmer
- 16 June – Lyan Cheng, actress, model and singer
- 30 June – Puff Kuo, model, actress and singer
- 26 July – Cheng Kai-wen, baseball player
- 29 July – Huang Pei-jia, actress
- 2 August – Nick Chou, actor and singer
- 11 August – Chen Po-liang, captain of Chinese Taipei national football team
- 3 September – Chang Chin-lan, actress
- 17 November – Joanne Tseng, singer and television host
- 22 November – Lorene Jen, artist
- 16 December – Lin Chen-hua, baseball player
- 28 December – Lo Chih-en, football player

== Deaths ==
- 13 January – Chiang Ching-kuo, 77, President (1978–1988).
- 8 March – Ting Chin-Pan, 94, general.
- 27 May – Wu Hsin-hua (吳新華), Taiwanese criminal, received a national record of ten death sentences (execution by shooting).
- 28 December – Xia Chuzhong, 84, general.
