= 1984 in Taiwan =

- Decades: 1960s; 1970s; 1980s; 1990s; 2000s
- See also: Other events of 1984; History of Taiwan • Timeline • Years

Events from the year 1984 in Taiwan. This year is numbered Minguo 73 according to the official Republic of China calendar.

== Incumbents ==
- President – Chiang Ching-kuo
- Vice President – Hsieh Tung-min, Lee Teng-hui
- Premier – Sun Yun-suan, Yu Kuo-hwa
- Vice Premier – Chiu Chuang-huan, Lin Yang-kang

== Events ==
=== January ===
- 1 January – The establishment of Kenting National Park in Pingtung County.

=== April ===
- 23 April – The first Han Kuang Exercise.

=== June ===
- 1 June – The founding of Compal Electronics.

=== July ===
- 27 July – The commissioning of first unit of Maanshan Nuclear Power Plant in Pingtung County.

== Births ==
- 16 January – Bea Hayden, actress and model
- 11 February – Huang Cheng-wei, baseball player
- 1 April – Wang Seng-wei, baseball player
- 4 June – Rainie Yang, singer, actress and TV host
- 7 August – Hsu Wei-ning, actress and model
- 8 August – Amanda Chou, actress
- 24 August – Kimi Hsia, actress and TV host
- 5 September – Mandy Wei, actress, model and host
- 6 September – Tseng Shu-o, football player
- 2 September – Danson Tang, actor and singer
- 22 September – Godfrey Gao, model and actor (died 2019)
- 28 September – Tsai Ming-chin, baseball player
- 21 October – Pets Tseng, actress, singer and television host
- 21 November – Sphinx Ting, actor and model
- 9 December – Hu Yingzhen, actress, model and host
- 20 December – Lala Hsu, singer and songwriter

== Deaths ==
- 13 January – Wen Yuan-ning, 84–85, diplomat and writer.
- 6 June – K. C. Wu, 80, politician, Chairman of the Taiwan Provincial Government (in the United States).
- 15 October – Henry Liu, 51, dissident, journalist and writer (assassinated in the United States by order of the Intelligence Bureau).
