= 1982 in Taiwan =

- Decades: 1960s; 1970s; 1980s; 1990s; 2000s
- See also: Other events of 1982; History of Taiwan • Timeline • Years

Events from the year 1982 in Taiwan. This year is numbered Minguo 71 according to the official Republic of China calendar.

== Incumbents ==
- President – Chiang Ching-kuo
- Vice President – Hsieh Tung-min
- Premier – Sun Yun-suan
- Vice Premier – Chiu Chuang-huan

== Events ==
=== June ===
- 27 June – The opening of Taitung Station in Taitung City, Taitung County.

=== July ===
- 1 July
  - The upgrade of Chiayi City and Hsinchu City from county-administered cities of Chiayi County and Hsinchu County respectively to provincial cities.
  - Xiangshan Township of Hsinchu County was incorporated to the newly formed Hsinchu City.

=== October ===
- 15 October – Aleksandr Solzhenitsyn visited Taiwan.

=== December ===
- 30 December – The establishment of Youchang Forest Park in Nanzih District, Kaohsiung City.

== Births ==
- 1 January – Lin Chih-sheng, baseball player
- 19 January – Angela Chang, singer and actress
- 24 January – Liu Keng-shin, baseball player
- 28 January – Lin Yueh-ping, baseball player
- 6 February – Tank, singer
- 26 February – Pan Li-chun, table tennis player
- 5 March – Pan Wei-lun, professional baseball pitcher
- 15 April – Chen Kuan-jen, baseball player
- 18 April – Chang Hsin-yan, actress
- 8 May – Lo Hsiao-ting, softball player
- 11 June – Lin Chih-chieh, basketball player
- 19 June – Joe Cheng, model, actor and singer
- 13 July – Pan Wei-chih, football player
- 7 August – Chang Ming-huang, discus thrower and shot putter
- 18 August – Feng Pao-hsing, football player
- 30 August
  - Tony Yang, actor
  - Wu Tsing-fong, songwriter
- 5 September – Cyndi Wang, singer and actress
- 11 September – Queenie Tai, actress
- 17 October – Cheng Po-jen, baseball player
- 23 October – Bianca Bai, actress and model
- 29 October – Ariel Lin, singer and actress
- 30 October – Abby Fung, actress
- 8 November – Ethan Juan, actor and model
- 16 December – Chiang Shih-lu, football player
- 26 December – Lin Cheng-feng, baseball player

== Deaths ==
- 14 January – Hsu Shu-hsi, 89, diplomat (in the United States).
- 26 May – Lee Shih-ke, 55, murderer and armed robber (execution by shooting).
- 5 October – Liu Shiyi, 95, general.
- 7 October – James Wei, 75, news media executive.
- 8 October – Cai Xiaoqian, 78, Communist defecter and general.
