= 1992 in Taiwan =

- Decades: 1970s; 1980s; 1990s; 2000s; 2010s
- See also: Other events of 1992; History of Taiwan • Timeline • Years

Events from the year 1992 in Taiwan. This year is numbered Minguo 81 according to the official Republic of China calendar.

== Incumbents ==
- President – Lee Teng-hui
- Vice President – Li Yuan-tsu
- Premier – Hau Pei-tsun
- Vice Premier – Shih Chi-yang

== Events ==
=== January ===
- 1 January – The establishment of Institute of Yilan County History in Yilan City, Yilan County.
- 27 January – The establishment of Fair Trade Commission.

=== February ===
- 12 February – The operation commencement of Cosmos Bank.
- 25 February – The establishment of Taishin International Bank.

=== April ===
- 28–29 April – Taiwan McDonald's bombings.

=== July ===
- 31 July – The passing of Act Governing Relations between the People of the Taiwan Area and the Mainland Area.

=== August ===
- 1 August – The disestablishment of Taiwan Garrison Command.
- 23 August – The termination of diplomatic relation with South Korea.

=== September ===
- 10 September – The upgrade of Puzi from township to county-administered city.

=== October ===
- 5 October – The opening of Central Signal Station of Taiwan Railways Administration in Shizi Township, Pingtung County.

=== November ===
- 7 November – The abolishment of Battle Field Administration.

=== December ===
- 19 December – The 1992 Republic of China legislative election.

== Births ==
- 15 February – Cheng I-ching, table tennis player
- 16 February – Nono Ku, actress and model
- 23 February – Wei Chen-yang, taekwondo athlete
- 2 March – Lai Pin-yu, cosplayer and member-elect of Legislative Yuan
- 9 March – Dewi Chien, singer
- 30 April – Chen Hao-wei, football player
- 28 September – Chen Ting-yang, football player
- 21 October – Vivian Sung, actress
- 28 October – Lo Kuo-hua, baseball player

== Deaths ==
- 31 July - Chow Shu-kai, 78, politician, Minister of Foreign Affairs (1971–1972).
- 4 October – Yuan Shouqian, 89, general and politician.
- 24 October – Chen Ta-ju, 75, lyricist.
