= 1989 in Taiwan =

- Decades: 1960s; 1970s; 1980s; 1990s; 2000s
- See also: Other events of 1989; History of Taiwan • Timeline • Years

Events from the year 1989 in Taiwan. This year is numbered Minguo 78 according to the official Republic of China calendar.

== Incumbents ==
- President – Lee Teng-hui
- Vice President – vacant
- Premier – Yu Kuo-hwa, Lee Huan
- Vice Premier – Shih Chi-yang

== Events ==
=== February ===
- 3 February – The founding of Peasant Party.

=== March ===
- 8 March – The establishment of EVA Air.
- 23 March – The establishment of Taiwan Lighting Fixture Export Association.

=== April ===
- 17 April – Taiwanese gymnasts arrive in China to compete in the Junior Asian Gymnastics Championships under the name Chinese Taipei, marking the first use of the term during a competition hosted in China.

=== July ===
- 1 July – The establishment of National Chung Cheng University in Minxiong Township, Chiayi County.
- 5 July – The opening of Fortune Junior College of Industry in Cishan Township, Kaohsiung County.
- 8 July – The opening of Formosa Fun Coast in Bali Township, Taipei County.
- 20 July – Government of the Republic of China establishes diplomatic relations with Grenada.

=== September ===
- 10 September – The landfall of Typhoon Sarah.

=== October ===
- 2 October – Government of the Republic of China resumes diplomatic relations with Liberia.
- 13 October – Government of the Republic of China establishes diplomatic relations with Belize.
- 26 October – The crash of China Airlines Flight 204 in Hualien County.

=== December ===
- 3 December – 1989 Republic of China legislative election.

== Births ==
- 23 January – Yani Tseng, professional golfer
- 28 April – Annie Chen, model and actress
- 13 May – Chuang Chia-chia, taekwondo athlete
- 11 August – Gui Gui, singer and actress
- 17 August – Chan Yung-jan, tennis athlete
- 26 August – Tan Wen-lin, football player
- 23 October – Chan Che-Yuan, football athlete

== Deaths ==
- 28 March – Fang Chih, 93, politician, diplomat, and government official.
- 14 April – Chiang Hsiao-wen, 53, politician, son of Chiang Ching-kuo
- 13 September – Yu Teng-fa, 84, politician.
