= 1987 in Taiwan =

- Decades: 1960s; 1970s; 1980s; 1990s; 2000s
- See also: Other events of 1987; History of Taiwan • Timeline • Years

Events from the year 1987 in Taiwan. This year is numbered Minguo 76 according to the official Republic of China calendar.

== Incumbents ==
- President – Chiang Ching-kuo
- Vice President – Lee Teng-hui
- Premier – Yu Kuo-hwa
- Vice Premier – Lin Yang-kang, Lien Chan

== Events ==
=== March ===
- 7 March – 1987 Lieyu Massacre in Kinmen County.

=== June ===
- 8 June - Yu Kuo-hwa and his wife visit Singapore.
- 12 June - Yu Kuo-hwa and his wife left Singapore.

=== July ===
- 1 July – The establishment of National College of Physical Education and Sports in Taoyuan County.
- 15 July – Martial law lifted by President Chiang Ching-kuo.

=== August ===
- 1 August – The establishment of Council of Labor Affairs.
- 22 August – The renaming of Environmental Protection Bureau to become the Environmental Protection Administration.

== Births ==
- 25 February – Mai Chia-je, baseball player
- 8 March – Lin Chih-hsiang, baseball player
- 19 March – Enno Cheng, singer, actress, writer
- 24 March – Eve Ai, singer and songwriter
- 8 April – Rachel Liang, singer
- 10 April – Sandrine Pinna, actress
- 2 May – Esther Yang, actress
- 15 May – Chang Chih-hao, baseball player
- 25 May – Jenna Wang, actress
- 23 August – Tsai Yi-chen, actress
- 17 September – Yang Ko-han, actress and producer
- 13 October – Teresa Lu, golf athlete
- 2 November – Lin Chiung-ying, football and futsal player
- 13 November – Lu Hsueh-mei, softball athlete
- 15 November – Mini Tsai, singer
- 20 November – Andrea Chen, model and actress
- 22 November – Yeh Tzu-cheng, swimming athlete

== Deaths ==
- 17 January – Gu Zhutong, 94, Chief of the General Staff (1948–1950).
- 8 August – Chi Shi-ying, 87, politician and dissident.
- 21 October – He Yingqin, 97, general.
