= 1991 in Taiwan =

- Decades: 1970s; 1980s; 1990s; 2000s; 2010s
- See also: Other events of 1991; History of Taiwan • Timeline • Years

Events from the year 1991 in Taiwan. This year is numbered Minguo 80 according to the official Republic of China calendar.

== Incumbents ==
- President – Lee Teng-hui
- Vice President – Li Yuan-tsu
- Premier – Hau Pei-tsun
- Vice Premier – Shih Chi-yang

== Events ==
=== January ===
- 28 January – The establishment of Mainland Affairs Council.

=== March ===
- 9 March – The official establishment of Straits Exchange Foundation in Taipei.

=== April ===
- 22 April – The abolishment of the Temporary Provisions Effective During the Period of Communist Rebellion.

=== May ===
- 11 May – The opening of Wang-an Airport in Wangan Township, Penghu.

=== June ===
- 1 June – The establishment of Mandarin Airlines.

=== July ===
- 1 July
  - The maiden flight of EVA Air.
  - The establishment of National Pingtung Institute of Commerce in Pingtung City, Pingtung County.
  - The start of Beitou Refuse Incineration Plant commercial operation in Beitou District, Taipei.

=== December ===
- 22 December – 1991 Republic of China National Assembly election.

== Births ==
- 3 February – Jass Yang, musician and producer
- 4 February – Ian Chen, singer, songwriter and actor
- 5 February – Wang Yao-lin, baseball player
- 16 March – Lin Yi-han, former writer
- 9 May – Hsu Shu-ching, weightlifter
- 29 May – Darren Wang, actor and model
- 18 June – Kai Ko, actor and singer
- 28 June
  - Lin Chang-lun, football athlete
  - Tu Kai-wen, judoka
- 20 July – Summer Meng, actress
- 25 July
  - Mini Chang, singer and actress
  - Jeremy Wang, online personality
- 30 July – Hsu Ya-ching, badminton player
- 22 August – Sharon Kao
- 27 September
  - Ann, singer
  - Lin Yu-hsien, badminton player

== Deaths ==
- 4 January – Sanmao, 47, writer (suicide).
- 1 July – Chiang Hsiao-wu, 46, government official, son of Chiang Ching-kuo.
