= 1986 in Taiwan =

- Decades: 1960s; 1970s; 1980s; 1990s; 2000s
- See also: Other events of 1986; History of Taiwan • Timeline • Years

Events from the year 1986 in Taiwan. This year is numbered Minguo 75 according to the official Republic of China calendar.

== Incumbents ==
- President – Chiang Ching-kuo
- Vice President – Lee Teng-hui
- Premier – Yu Kuo-hwa
- Vice Premier – Lin Yang-kang

== Events ==
=== January ===
- 1 January – The establishment of National Museum of Natural Science in North District, Taichung City.

=== March ===
- 30 March – The founding of Hitron.

=== August ===
- 1 August – The opening of National Open University in Luzhou City, Taipei County.

=== September ===
- 19 September – The completion of Yunlin Prison expansion in Huwei Township, Yunlin County.
- 26 September – The closing of Sankuaicuo Station in Sanmin District, Kaohsiung City.
- 28 September – The founding of Democratic Progressive Party.

=== November ===
- 28 November
  - The start of operation of Canadian Trade Office in Taipei in Taipei City.
  - The reestablishment of Taroko National Park.

=== December ===
- 6 December – 1986 Republic of China National Assembly and legislative election.

== Births ==
- 4 January – Cheng Shao-chieh, badminton athlete
- 20 January – Genie Chuo, singer and actress
- 19 February – Amber Kuo, singer and actress
- 5 March – Chang Tsai-hsing, actor
- 8 March – Amanda Chu, actress
- 7 May – Pai Hsiao-ma, badminton athlete
- 12 June – Alicia Liu, model and television personality
- 8 July – Chloe Wang, actress, singer and host
- 5 August – Chang Cheng-wei, baseball player
- 6 October – Chiang Ming-han, football athlete
- 12 November – Evan Yo, singer-songwriter
- 26 December – Tseng Li-cheng, taekwondo athlete

== Deaths ==
- 25 February – Tu Tsung-ming, 92, pharmacologist.
- 9 May – Thomas Liao, 76, Taiwanese independence activist.
- 1 December – Lien Chen-tung, 82, politician, Minister of the Interior (1960–1966).
