= 1993 in Taiwan =

- Decades: 1970s; 1980s; 1990s; 2000s; 2010s
- See also: Other events of 1993; History of Taiwan • Timeline • Years

Events from the year 1993 in Taiwan. This year is numbered Minguo 82 according to the official Republic of China calendar.

== Incumbents ==
- President – Lee Teng-hui
- Vice President – Lien Chan
- Premier – Hau Pei-tsun, Lien Chan
- Vice Premier – Shih Chi-yang, Hsu Li-teh

== Events ==
=== March ===
- 7 March – The establishment of Civil Party.

=== September ===
- 28 September – The launch of TVBS.

=== October ===
- 15 October – The establishment of Council of Asian Liberals and Democrats in Taipei.
- 16 October – The inauguration of Institute of Yilan County History in Yilan County.

== Births ==
- 3 January – Candy Chen, dancer, actress, host, singer and model
- 24 February – Shuai Pei-ling, badminton player
- 12 May – Ming Jie, actor and singer
- 20 May – Lin Shih-chia, archer
- 30 June – Lin Chia-yu, badminton player
- 1 August – Chen Szu-yu, table tennis player
- 12 August – Hannah Quinlivan, actress and model
- 29 August – Oceana Wu, actress
- 19 September – Chan Hao-ching, tennis player
- 26 September – Huang Wei-chieh, baseball player
- 7 November – Tan Ya-ting, archer

== Deaths ==
- 7 March – Yang Chi-tseng, 94, politician and engineer, Minister of Economic Affairs (1955–1965).
- 11 May – Chen Chi-chuan, 94, Mayor of Kaohsiung (1960–1968).
- 21 May – Liu Kuo-tsai, 81–82, politician, President of the Legislative Yuan (1988–1990), Vice President of the Legislative Yuan (1972–1988).
- 20 June – Yu Yu-hsien, 58, economist, Minister of Council of Agriculture of the Republic of China (1988–1992).
- 11 December – Ku Cheng-kang, 91, politician and anti-communist activist.
- 24 December – Yen Chia-kan, 88, President of the Republic of China (1975–1978), Vice President (1966–1975), Premier (1963–1972).
