= Gū (surname) =

Gu (Chinese: 辜; pinyin: Gū; Wade–Giles: Ku¹) is a Chinese-language surname, usually spelled as "Ku" or "Koo" in Taiwan. In 2013 it was found to be the 340th most common surname, shared by 138,000 people or 0.010% of the population in China.

== Notable people ==
- Koo family of Lukang, a prominent Taiwanese-Japanese business family who founded the Koos Group known as 和信集團
  - Koo Hsien-jung
  - Jeffrey Koo Sr. (Ambassador-at-Large, Chairman of Chinatrust Bank, and "Father of Credit Cards")
  - Koo Chen-fu (Taiwanese diplomat and businessman)
  - Chester Koo
  - Koo Kwang-ming (1926–2023)
  - Leslie Koo
  - Richard Koo
- Nono Ku, Taiwanese actress and model
- Gu Hongyu (辜轰余; January 31, 1971 in Beijing) a retired male beach volleyball player from the People's Republic of China
- Koh Lay Huan (辜禮歡甲, died 1826), Chinese-born businessman who became the first Kapitan China of Penang
- Ku Hung-ming, Chinese writer
- Gu Jiaming (Chinese: 辜家明) a retired female badminton player from China
