= 1981 in Taiwan =

- Decades: 1960s; 1970s; 1980s; 1990s; 2000s
- See also: Other events of 1981; History of Taiwan • Timeline • Years

Events from the year 1981 in Taiwan. This year is numbered Minguo 70 according to the official Republic of China calendar.

== Incumbents ==
- President – Chiang Ching-kuo
- Vice President – Hsieh Tung-min
- Premier – Sun Yun-suan
- Vice Premier – Hsu Ching-chung, Chiu Chuang-huan

== Events ==
=== January ===
- 11 January – The opening of Alishan Station in Alishan Township, Chiayi County.

=== March ===
- 2 March – The establishment of Construction and Planning Agency in Taipei.
- 29 March – 12th National Congress of Kuomintang in Taipei.

=== April ===
- 1 April – The opening of Far Eastern Memorial Hospital in Banqiao City, Taipei County.

=== July ===
- 1 July
  - The establishment of Chung-Hua Institution for Economic Research in Taipei.
  - The official establishment of Taitung Airport in Taitung County.

=== August ===
- 22 August – The crash of Far Eastern Air Transport Flight 103 over Taipei.

=== October ===
- 31 October – The establishment of Chung Cheng Aviation Museum in Taoyuan County (now Taoyuan City).

=== December ===
- 25 December – The upgrade of Douliu, Magong, Miaoli, Nantou and Xinying from urban townships to a county-administered cities.

== Births ==
- 9 January – Sun Shu-may, pop singer, actress and TV host
- 22 January – Alan Ko, singer and actor
- 2 February – Peggy Hsu, singer-songwriter, music composer and music producer
- 4 February – Tsai Shu-min, swimmer
- 17 February – Hope Lin, actress
- 22 March
  - Frankie Huang, actor and television host
  - Kaiser Chuang, actor
- 25 March – Yang Sen, professional baseball player
- 1 April – Annie Liu, actress
- 13 May – Jag Huang, actor
- 24 May – Linda Liao, singer, actress, VJ and gamer
- 30 May – Deserts Chang, singer and songwriter
- 18 June – Ella Chen, singer and actress
- 8 August – Candie Kung, golfer
- 16 August – Wan Wan, actress
- 24 August – Jiro Wang, model, actor and singer
- 2 October – Timi Zhuo, singer and actress
- 14 October – Roy Chiu, actor, singer and race driver
- 26 October – Chou Ssu-chi, baseball player
- 31 October – Selina Jen, singer and actress
- 1 November – Lin Tzu-hui, weightlifter athlete
- 11 November – Sharon Hsu, actor and singer
- 16 November – Yvonne Yao, actress
- 20 November – Athena Lee Yen, actress

== Deaths ==
- 5 February – Feng Yong, 80 educator, military leader and politician
- 24 April – Liu Yuzhang, 77, general.
- 11 April – Liu Mao'en, 82, general.
- 2 July – Chen Wen-chen, 31, mathematician (unclear cause of death, possible murder by the Taiwan Garrison Command.)
- 12 July – Chen Ching-yu, 81–82, politician and fiscal official.
- 20 November – George Yeh, 77, Minister of Foreign Affairs (1949–1958)
