= 1985 in Taiwan =

- Decades: 1960s; 1970s; 1980s; 1990s; 2000s
- See also: Other events of 1985; History of Taiwan • Timeline • Years

Events from the year 1985 in Taiwan. This year is numbered Minguo 74 according to the official Republic of China calendar.

== Incumbents ==
- President – Chiang Ching-kuo
- Vice President – Lee Teng-hui
- Premier – Yu Kuo-hwa
- Vice Premier – Lin Yang-kang

== Events ==
=== January ===
- 5 January – The establishment of Institute of Transportation.

=== February ===
- 9 February – the total amount of loans made by the Taipei 10th Credit Corporation(臺北十信) accounted for 102% of the total deposits. In order to protect the legitimate rights and interests of depositors, the Ministry of Finance ordered the cooperative to suspend business for three days, and temporarily took over the cooperation from the Taiwan Provincial Cooperative, strictly inspecting and rectifying the situation.

=== August ===
- 1 August – The opening of Minghu Dam in Nantou County.
- 27 August – The inauguration of Keelung City Cultural Center in Keelung.

=== October ===
- 19 October – The start of the construction to expand Yunlin Prison in Huwei Township, Yunlin County.
- 25 October – The opening of Zhongli Arts Hall in Taoyuan County (now Taoyuan City).

=== December ===
- 31 December – The inauguration of Taipei World Trade Center in Xinyi District, Taipei.

== Births ==
- 8 January – Chan Chin-wei, tennis athlete
- 10 January – Ko Chia-yen, actress
- 15 January – Hush, singer
- 22 January – Chen Cho-yi, swimmer
- 26 January – Allison Lin, actress
- 28 February – Lee Tai-lin, football athlete
- 18 March – Chen Hui-shan, football goalkeeper
- 6 April – Lu Ying-chi, weightlifting athlete
- 11 May – Tia Lee, singer, actress and model
- 20 June – Cheng Chi-hung, baseball player
- 2 July – Renée Chen, singer and songwriter
- 15 July – Crowd Lu, singer-songwriter and actor
- 18 September – Amber An, model, singer and actress
- 5 November – Ma Chih-hung, luge athlete
- 20 November – Aaron Yan, model, actor and singer
- 25 December – Chang Han, football athlete

== Deaths ==
- 12 March – Yang Kui, 78, writer.
- 26 August – Chang Chi-yun, 83, Minister of Education (1954–1958).
- 2 September – Yu Ching-tang, 88–89, Vice Premier (1963–1966).
- 3 July – Hsu Pu-liao, 34, actor, complications of alcoholic hepatitis.
