= National Tainan Girls' Senior High School =

Coordinates: 22.9873°N 120.2066°E

- 國立臺南女子高級中學
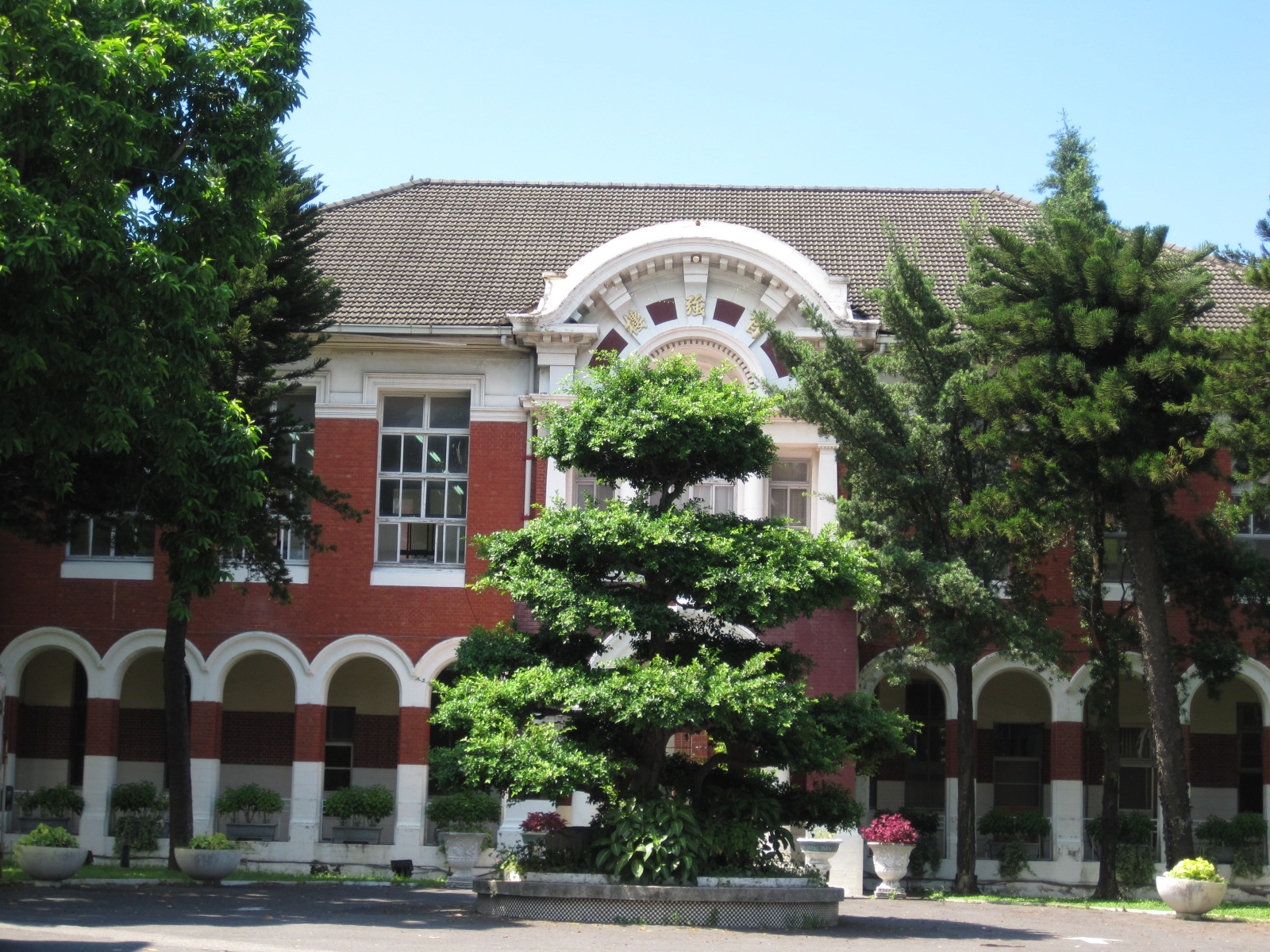
- West Central District, Tainan, Taiwan

Information
- Former name: First Girls' Senior Middle School of Tainan County; Second Girls' Senior Middle School of Tainan County; Provincial Tainan First Girls' Middle School; Provincial Tainan Girls' Middle School; Provincial Tainan Girls' Senior High School
- Type: Senior high school
- Established: 1917

The National Tainan Girls' Senior High School (Chinese: 國立臺南女子高級中學) is a public senior high school in West Central District, Tainan, Taiwan. It was established in 1917 and is considered one of the most prestigious high schools in Taiwan, usually only accepting students who rank in the top 3 percentile of the Taiwan Basic Scholastic Test.

== History ==
This school was founded by incorporating two schools during the Japanese rule of Taiwan. One was the First Girls' Senior Middle School of Tainan County established in 1917, which recruited Japanese students. The other was the Second Girls' Senior Middle School of Tainan County established in 1921, which recruited Taiwanese students and renamed the Provincial Tainan First Girls' Middle School after the handover of Taiwan from Japan to the Republic of China in 1945.

In 1947, the school was renamed the Provincial Tainan Girls' Middle School. In August 1970, the school was further renamed the Provincial Tainan Girls' Senior High School, and finally in February 2000, given its present name National Tainan Girls' Senior High School. In 1971, A Complementary School on the Air was added to the school but terminated in 1975. In 1984, an Experimental Music Class was set up for musically gifted students, including both boys and girls. In 1987, an Experimental Math and Science Class was set up for gifted students in these fields. In August 2003, a Bilingual Resource Class was established for gifted students in the related fields. Taken together, all these measures have made this school an excellent preparatory school for college education.

== Feature ==
It is known to be extremely difficult to study in this school during the high school stage, as only the top scorers on the High School Entrance Exam for Junior High School Students around southern Taiwan will receive admissions. Getting the admission in the National Tainan Girls' Senior High School is considered as an honourable affair by not only parents but also by teachers and society in general. Students studying at the school also opens opportunities to attend prestigious universities in Taiwan. Students who attend a prestigious school bring honour to their ancestors (one of the core values of Chinese society).

== Protest ==
During a weekly school assembly on Monday on March 15, 2010, more than 1,600 students at National Tainan Girls' Senior High School took off their long pants and revealed the shorts underneath at the school assembly on Monday to protest against the school's new regulation banning students from wearing sports shorts. The new regulation was suggested by a disciplinary teacher, surname Chen, who had just joined the school this term. She stopped students from wearing sports shorts outside physical education classes and required their sports jackets to be zipped up to the second buttons of their shirts. The new regulations were implemented before calling a meeting with the school representatives.

Some students found the implementation of the new uniform regulations a breach of the school rules and the spirit of a liberal and democratic school. They said the new regulation deprived them of their basic rights protected under the regulations of the Ministry of Education. They also claimed that they had requested a meeting with school officials but the school did not respond. A group of eight students called for a protest through text messages and a Web site. They students wore the approved uniform with long pants at the morning assembly.

However, after the flag ceremony and the official greetings, about 80 percent of the 2,000 students took off their outer long pants together, showing the sports shorts they wore inside. The action was publicly supported by some teachers and school graduates.

The school principal Tsou Chun-hsuan said at the assembly after the action that he "loves the school's shorts" and the school will respect and listen to the student's appeals. The school immediately called a meeting with the student representatives and decided to allow students the choice of wearing long or short pants in school.

Secretary of the school Joyce Wang told The China Post, "The principal knew about the protest beforehand but decided to have the assembly as normal, so that the students have a method to register their protest." The school had issued questionnaires on the uniform regulations. They will have further meeting with the students on March 30 to discuss whether the uniform regulations are out of date.

Lai Yu-mei, secretary general of Taiwan Gender Equity Education Association said, "It is sad that the students have to take such radical actions for the school to hear their voice. We had received complaints from students of many other schools that uniform regulations are rigid and unreasonable."

For example, in most schools in Taiwan, wearing a dress is still compulsory for female students, which Lai commented that it was against the Gender Equity Education Act. She said schools should allow students to decide their uniforms democratically.

== Notable alumni ==
- Ting Yao-tiao, victim of the White Terror
- Lin Yi-han, writer

== See also ==
- Education in Taiwan
