= 1990 in Taiwan =

- Decades: 1970s; 1980s; 1990s; 2000s; 2010s
- See also: Other events of 1990; History of Taiwan • Timeline • Years

Events from the year 1990 in Taiwan, Republic of China. This year is numbered Minguo 79 according to the official Republic of China calendar.

== Incumbents ==
- President – Lee Teng-hui
- Vice President – Lee Yuan-tsu
- Premier – Lee Huan, Hau Pei-tsun
- Vice Premier – Shih Chi-yang

== Events ==
=== March ===
- 16–22 March – Wild Lily student movement in Taipei.

=== April ===
- 21 April – The opening of Taiwan Theater Museum in Yilan City, Yilan County.

=== June ===
- 5 June – The Executive Yuan Academy passed the nomination of Lien Chan as a member and chairman of the Taiwan Provincial Government, and passed the nomination of Wu Den-yih as Mayor of Kaohsiung. Then, also asked the Taiwan Provincial Assembly and Kaohsiung City Council to exercise their right of consent.

=== July ===
- 21–22 July – The Min Ping Yu No. 5540 transports 76 mainland Chinese from Yilan County, Taiwan to Pingtan County, Fujian. Twenty-five Chinese die of suffocation during the journey.

=== August ===
- 13 August – ROCS Wen Shan PF-834 strikes and sinks the Min Ping Yu No. 5202, killing 21 of 50 Chinese being repatriated to Fujian.

=== September ===
- 12 September – The signing of Kinmen Agreement between Red Cross Society of the Republic of China and Red Cross Society of China in Kinmen.

=== October ===
- 8 October – The inauguration of the current Taipei City Council building at Xinyi District, Taipei.

=== December ===
- 10 December – 27th Golden Horse Awards in National Theater and Concert Hall, Taipei.

== Births ==
- 24 February – Lu Chia-pin, badminton player
- 17 April – Lei Chien-ying, archer
- 29 May – Huang Ting-ying, track and road cyclist
- 10 July – Lin Man-ting, football and futsal player
- 7 October – Liao Kuan-hao, badminton player
- 7 November - Bao Hsi-le, basketball player
- 14 November – Chang Hao, sailor
- 4 December – Cindy Yang, actress and model
- 30 December – Beatrice Fang, actress

== Deaths ==
- 25 January – Yu Jishi, 85, general.
- 21 June – Zheng Yanfen, 88, politician, Minister of Justice (1960-1967).
- 14 November – Sun Lianzhong, 97, general.
- 21 September – Chiang Fu-tsung, 91, educator and politician.
- 19 November – Sun Li-jen, 89, general and political repression victim.
- 14 December – Zhang Qun, 101, politician, former Premier (1947–1948).
