= Taiwan Lighting Fixture Export Association =

Taiwan Lighting Fixture Export Association 台灣區照明燈具輸出業同業公會
- Formation: 23 March 1989
- Headquarters: Sanchong, New Taipei
- Location: Taiwan
- President: Lin Ching-Yuan。
- Convenor: Yao Wen
- Website: www.lighting.org.tw

The Taiwan Lighting Fixture Export Association (TLFEA); in Chinese: 台灣區照明燈具輸出業同業公會; (abbreviated 台灣區照明公會) is administrated by the Ministry of the Interior of the Republic of China and was established in March 1989. As of 2023, TLFEA has over 850 members specializing in the light fixture industry. The company headquarters are located in Sanchong District, New Taipei City, Taiwan.

== History ==
TLFEA formed on 23 March 1989. There are now over 850 corporate members. Its intended purpose is to:

- Improve foreign trade
- Promote economic growth,
- Enhance communication and interaction
- Increase mutual interests.

== Organization ==
General assembly as the highest organization gathering once every year, to elect the members on both Board of Director and Board of Supervisor (3 years as 1 term). There are 27 directors on the board to elect the 9 executive directors, the president of TLFEA being elected from 9 executives. Mr. Huang Ming-Chih (黃明智), is the present president, Mr. Fung Song-Yang (馮松陽), Mr. Kang Wen-Jie (康文杰), Mr. Tung Hsien-Yuan (董顯元), and Mr. Chen, Bing-Hung (陳炳宏) are as Vice-Presidents of TLFEA.

The Board of Supervisor 9 members to elect 3 executive supervisors, then elect again to decide the convener. Mr. Yaw Wen (姚文) is the present convener of TLFEA.

The secretary office is managed under the president, having 9 full-time employees to deal with the general affairs, with Mr. Li Hui-Yang (李輝陽) as the secretary general TLFEA.

== List of President ==
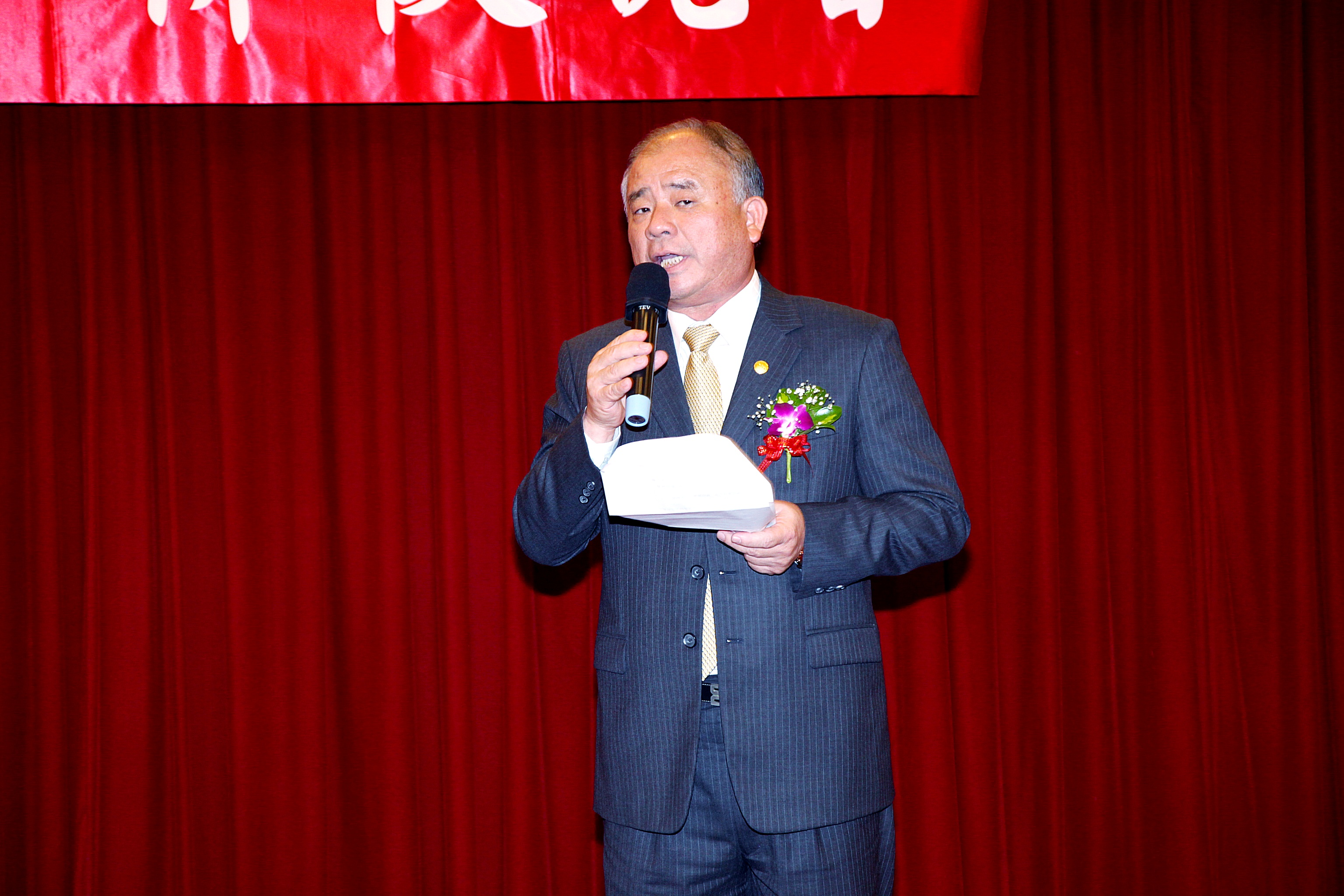
黃明智理事長

Name	Chinese	Term
Wang Tai-Ping	王太平	March 1989 –March 1992
Lin Zheng-Lun	林正倫	March 1992 –March 1995
Chen Bao-Chin	陳寶欽	March 1995 –March 1998
Zhan Nien-Bo	詹年博	March 1998 –March 2001
Hung Hao-Cheng	洪皓成	March 2001 –March 2004
Chen Jing-Xi	陳金錫	March 2004 –March 2007
Wu Zhao-Ling	吳照麟	March 2007 –March 2010
David Chang	張孔誠	March 2010 –April 2013
Lin Ching-Yuan	林慶源	April 2013 –April 2016
Huang Ming-Chih	黃明智	April 2016 –Present

== Committee ==
- General Affairs Committee (Chairman: Mr. Yang Hung-Yu((楊弘裕))), North district Sodality (Chairman: Ms. Lee Shiu-Ling((李秀玲))), Central district Sodality( Chairman: Ms. Chen Shuei Jeng(((陳雪貞))), South district Sodality (Chairman: Mr. Kuo Rui-Fu((郭瑞富))).
- Lighting Technology Committee (Chairman: Mr. Dong Hsien-Yuan((董顯元)))
- Industrial League Committee (Chairman: Ms. Chien Yu-Mei((簡玉美)))
- International Affairs Committee (Chairman: Mr. Michael Hsieh((謝勝文))), Taiwan-Japan Lighting Industry Exchanging Sodality (Chairman: Mr. Chang Shang-Hsien)
- Exhibition Affairs Committee (Chairman: Mr. Hung Ming-Zhi((黃明智)))
- Information Affairs Committee (Chairman: Mr. Chiang De-Chung((江德聰)))
- Education and Training Affairs Committee (Chairman: Mr. Edward Po((柏健生)))
- Lighting Development Committee (Chairman: Mr. Chiu Wen-Liang((邱文良)))
- New Generation Lighting Committee (Chairman: Mr. Arron Cheng((鄭遠智)))
- Cross-Straits Lighting Committee( Chairman: Mr. Lin Ching-Fang((林慶芳)))

== Cross-Straits and International Cooperation ==
- China Illuminating Engineering Society: 1994
- Global Lighting Association (GLA): 2010.
- Zhaga Consortium: 2013
- Polish Association of Lighting Industry: 2013
- Turkish Lighting Luminaire Association: 2013
- Japan Lighting Manufacturers Association: 2014

== Exhibition ==
- Taiwan International Lighting Show
- Lighting Japan
- Lighting Fair Tokyo/ LED Next Stage Show
- Frankfurt Light and Building Show
- Guangzhou International Lighting Show
- Light India
- Taitronics Show
- Hong Kong International Lightins Show (Autumn Edition)
- Lighting Middle East
- Interlight Moscow
- Taipei International Architecture and Construction Show
