= 1983 in Taiwan =

- Decades: 1960s; 1970s; 1980s; 1990s; 2000s
- See also: Other events of 1983; History of Taiwan • Timeline • Years

Events from the year 1983 in Taiwan. This year is numbered Minguo 72 according to the official Republic of China calendar.

== Incumbents ==
- President – Chiang Ching-kuo
- Vice President – Hsieh Tung-min
- Premier – Sun Yun-suan
- Vice Premier – Chiu Chuang-huan

== Events ==
=== March ===
- 28 March – The commissioning of first unit of Tunghsiao Power Plant in Miaoli County.

=== August ===
- 8 August – The establishment of Taipei Fine Arts Museum in Zhongshan District, Taipei.

=== September ===
- 1 September – 23 Taiwanese citizens were among the victims in Korean Air Lines Flight 007 that was shot down by a Soviet interceptor jet and crashed near Moneron Island, Soviet Union, killing all 269 passengers and crew.

=== October ===
- 31 October – The opening of Guandu Bridge which links Taipei and New Taipei.

=== December ===
- 3 December – 1983 Republic of China legislative election.

== Births ==
- 8 January – Pan Tzu-hui, softball athlete
- 19 January – Jane Huang, singer
- 30 March – Hebe Tien, actress and singer
- 22 April – Chang Chia-che, long-distance running athlete
- 12 May – Ho Ming-tsan, football player
- 28 May – Marcus Chang, actor and singer-songwriter
- 31 May – Michelle Chen, actress and singer
- 10 June – Hsueh Shih-ling, actor, rapper, songwriter and television presenter
- 11 July – Christine Kuo, actress
- 23 July – Wong Jinglun, tv host
- 27 August – Chen Bolin, actor
- 6 September – Jing Chang, singer
- 20 September
  - Shone An, singer and actor
  - A-Lin, singer and lyricist
- 8 October – Maggie Wu, model and actress
- 11 October – Wu Hsiao-li, volleyball player
- 31 October – Jay Shih, actor, singer and TV host
- 2 December – Monica Yin, actress
- 28 November – Alien Huang, singer and actor (died 2020)
- 25 December – Gwei Lun-mei actress
- 28 December – Joseph Chang, actor

== Deaths ==
- 6 February – Li Mei-shu, 80, painter, sculptor, and politician.
- 3 March – Fang Xianjue, 79, general.
- 2 April – Chang Dai-chien, 83, painter.
- 30 June – Hsu Shih-hsien, 75, former Mayor of Chiayi City.
- 15 September – Chien Shih-Liang, 75, chemist and President of Academia Sinica.
