= Fang Si-Chi's First Love Paradise =

Novel by Lin Yi-han

- Author: Lin Yi-han
- Publisher: Guerrilla Publishing
- Publication date: 2017-02-07
- Publication place: Taiwan
- ISBN: 9789869236478

Fang Si-Chi’s First Love Paradise (Traditional Chinese: 房思琪的初戀樂園; Simplified Chinese: 房思琪的初恋乐园) is the first and only novel by Taiwanese author Lin Yi-han published in February 2017. Shortly after publishing the novel, Lin Yi-han died by suicide.

The novel follows Fang Si-chi, a secondary-school student who is groomed and sexually abused by her teacher, Li Guo-hua.

== Reception ==
Sociologist and Scholar Li Yinhe said, "Judging from the sociological perspective, the novel raises social awareness of child molestation and domestic violence. From the literary values, Lin Yihan is simply outstanding and worthy of all respect; she is genuinely a gifted novelist."

== Award ==
- 2017: Openbook Annual Good Book Award
- 2018: Top Ten Books of the Year of the 19th Shenzhen Reading Month
