= The Legend of Tianding =

2021 video game

- Developer: CGCG
- Publisher: Neon Doctrine
- Engine: Unity
- Platform: Windows; Nintendo Switch; PlayStation 4; PlayStation 5; Xbox One; Xbox Series X/S; iOS
- Release: Switch, Windows; November 1, 2021; Xbox One, Xbox Series X/S; October 31, 2022; PlayStation 4, PlayStation 5 January 18, 2023 iOS; March 2, 2023
- Genre: Side-scrolling platform / beat 'em up

The Legend of Tianding (Note: Chinese: 廖添丁 - 絕代兇賊之死期; pinyin: Liào Tiāndīng — juédài xiōngzéi zhī sǐqī; lit. 'Liao Tianding — end of the legendary bandit') is a side-scrolling platform beat 'em up video game developed by Creative Games & Computer Graphics (CGCG) (Note: 創遊遊戲) and published by Neon Doctrine for Switch, PlayStation 4, PlayStation 5, Xbox One, and Xbox Series X/S; and personal computers running Windows (via Steam) and iOS. It was released initially for Switch and Steam on November 1, 2021, and ported to additional platforms approximately a year later.

== Gameplay and plot ==
The game is based on the life of Liao Tianding, a young heroic outlaw who won fame as a Taiwanese Robin Hood for his exploits during the Japanese colonial period. In the game, which is set in the Dadaocheng district of Taipei at the start of the 20th century, Liao is equipped with a dagger and his signature red waist sash, using his martial arts skills to overcome foes. The basic attack using the dagger will reduce the enemy health bar. Players also can expend one stamina bar to use one of Liao's special martial art skills, which can be used to attack enemies and also to reach areas that are not accessible through normal moves. These skills can be linked together in combination. When the enemy health bar is reduced to half (or less), it turns yellow and Liao can then use his red sash to steal a weapon from the enemy. The stolen weapons are more powerful than the dagger, but break after a limited number of uses.

If the player collects special artifacts, these can be applied to provide a permanent boost to the character's statistics, including boosts to player stamina or the amount of money dropped by enemies. These special artifacts are hidden in the levels, and also can be provided as rewards for donating money to beggars. Liao also has a brocade amulet bag (香火袋) with three slots to equip Taoist coin charms, each taking one or two slots, which also provide boosts to player statistics.

Players also can participate in a four color cards minigame, although a review of the gameplay noted it was easy to lose money. A "Boss Rush" mode was added via a free download update in 2022.

== Development ==
The game was based on an earlier Flash game developed in the early 2000s by "Maso" Lin Bing-shu (林秉舒), who built the Flash game for his master's degree in multimedia. In April 2019, PP Wang invited Lin to lead a team to build a new 2D platformer game, sharing the story of Liao Tianding worldwide. Both Wang and Lin had worked for large game companies, but resigned in favor of pursuing independent games after meeting by chance and seeing the opportunity to serve as producers for Legend of Tianding.

According to an interview with CGCG, the team were inspired by the visual style of Hong Kong comics, drawing on gameplay from titles including Shank (for combat), Guacamelee! (for player movement), Dead Cells (for selectable weapons), and Mega Man and Hollow Knight (for end-of-level boss fights). The difficulty level was rebalanced in favor of making the boss fights more challenging after early feedback on the initial version.

=== Release ===
The game was released initially for Switch and Steam on November 1, 2021. Ports for PS4, PS5, Xbox One, and Xbox Series X|S were released on October 31, 2022. The iOS launch was delayed to March 2023. The Windows version was later released DRM-free on GOG.com on February 23, 2024.

The game won the "Best Indie Game – Drama Award" at the Taipei Game Show in 2022.
