= Ting Yao-tiao =

Taiwanese victim of the White Terror (1927–1956)

Teng Iáu-thiáu
- 丁窈窕
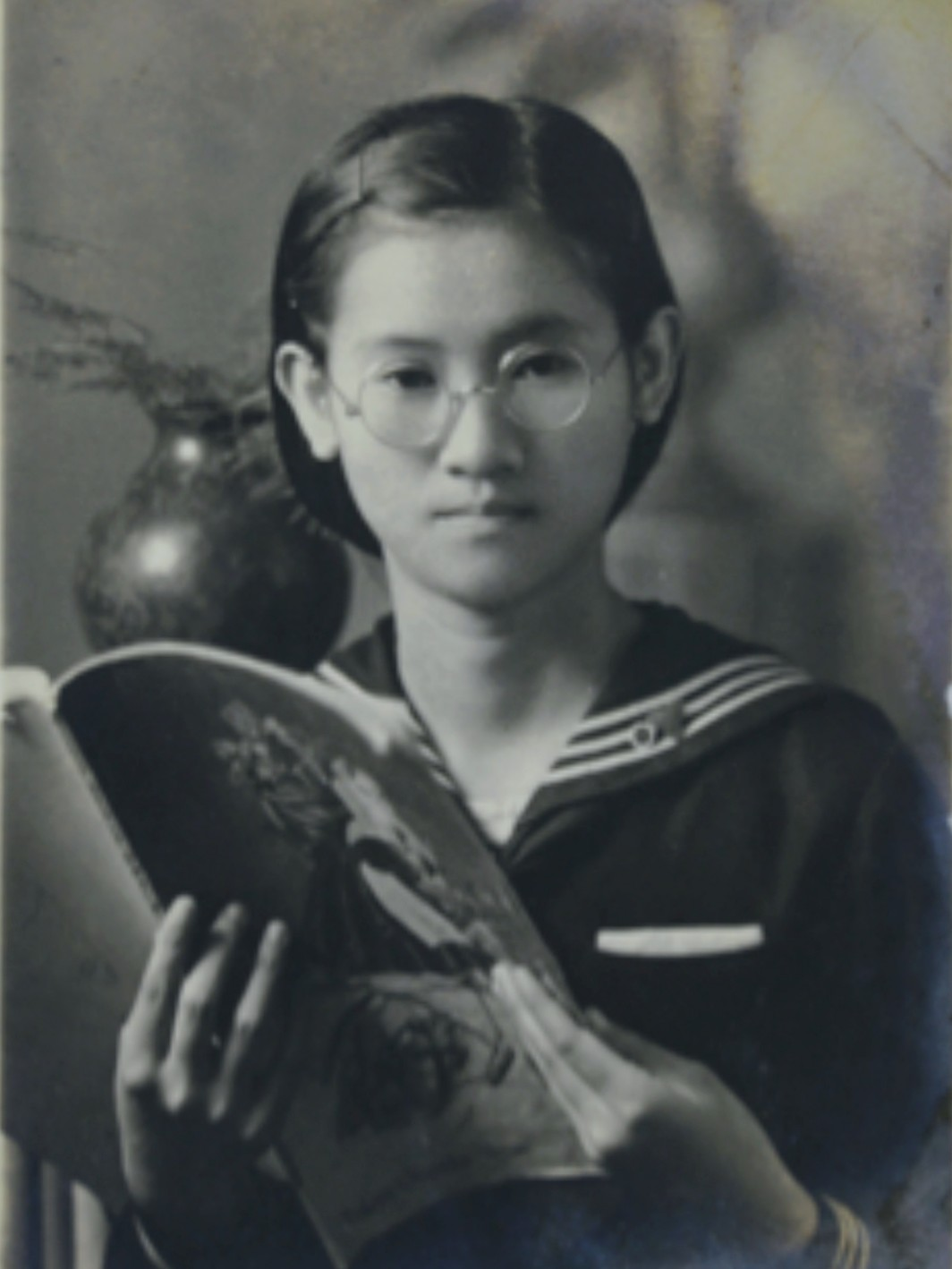
- Ting as a high school student
- Born: December 21, 1927; Tainan, Tainan Prefecture, Japanese Taiwan
- Died: July 24, 1956 (aged 28); Machangding, Taipei, Taiwan
- Education: National Tainan Girls' Senior High School

Ting Yao-tiao (Chinese: 丁窈窕; pinyin: Dīng Yǎotiǎo; Wade–Giles: Ting^{1} Yao^{3}-tʻiao^{3}; Pe̍h-ōe-jī: Teng Iáu-thiáu; December 21, 1927 – July 24, 1956) was a Taiwanese postal worker who is remembered for her execution during the White Terror after being falsely accused of espionage.

== Early life ==
Ting Yao-tiao was born on December 21, 1927, as the fourth of ten children. After graduating from National Tainan Girls' Senior High School in 1945, she started working at the post office. In 1951, when Kuo Chen-chun (Chinese: 郭振純; pinyin: Guō Zhènchún) helped Yeh Ting-kuei to run for the mayor of Tainan, he met Ting. The two fell in love due to their similar interests, but she broke off the engagement due to Kuo's busy social life and married another man.

== Imprisonment and death ==
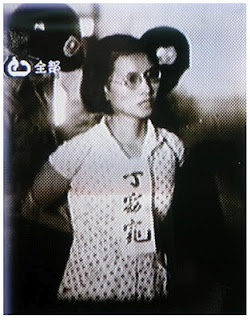
Ting shortly before her execution

During the martial law period, the Kuomintang government offered substantial rewards to anyone who reported Communist spies, making false reports a common method of taking revenge for certain slights. To retaliate for telling her friend Shih Shui-huan not to get together with him, an informant reported Ting to the authorities for having a banned book on her desk. Initially, her colleague stopped the letter implicating Ting, but after he himself was suspected of leading a Communist Party branch at the post office, he confessed to having blocked the accusation. Thus, Ting was arrested while she was pregnant and imprisoned in 1953, according to Kuo, who had also been imprisoned, or in 1954, according to the Taipei Times. Ting and Shih were executed by firing squad on July 24, 1956.

== Legacy ==
Before her execution, Kuo cut himself to meet Ting at the infirmary, where she was getting an injection for her newborn child. Ting gave him a metal cigarette tin with a lock of her hair and a farewell letter inside. After his early release in 1975 due to Chiang Kai-shek's death, he learned of Ting's execution and buried the tin under a tree at National Tainan Girls’ Senior High School. It was rediscovered in 2015 after a typhoon unearthed the tree. Ting was also remembered by her classmates in the alumni association's 90th anniversary journal.
