= Liao Tianding =

Taiwanese "Robin Hood" figure (1883–1909)

- 廖添丁
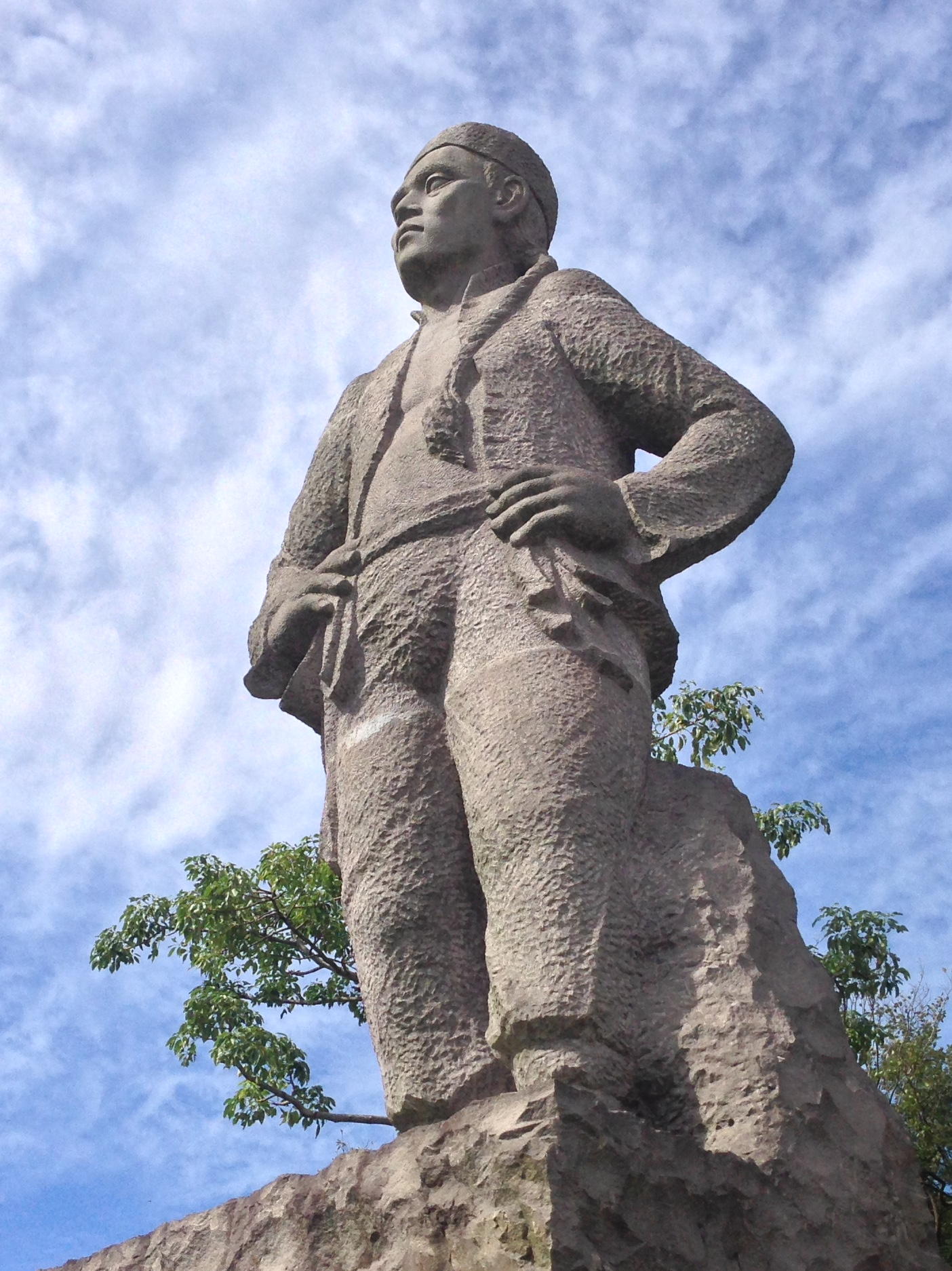
- Statue of Liao Tianding adjacent to Hanmin Temple
- Born: May 21, 1883; Upper Tōa-to͘ District, Changhua
- Died: November 19, 1909 (aged 26); Bali District, New Taipei City
- Occupation: criminal

Liao Tianding (Chinese: 廖添丁; pinyin: Liào Tiāndīng; Pe̍h-ōe-jī: Liāu Thiam-teng; Hepburn: Ryō Tentei; 1883–1909; sometimes romanized as Liao Tien-ting) was a legendary Taiwanese Robin Hood figure who foiled oppressive rulers when Taiwan was under Japanese rule.

== Biography ==
He was born in the Upper Tōa-to͘ District (大肚上堡) in Changhua, Taiwan Prefecture (Qing-dynasty Taiwan; modern-day Qingshui, Taichung, Taiwan) in 1883. Liao's father died when he was eight. After Taiwan became a colony of Japan in 1895, he caught the attention of Japanese authorities repeatedly, for larceny and robbery, starting at the age of 18; official records indicate that Liao was sentenced to prison at least as early as 1902, and that he continued to commit minor robberies and thefts until his death in 1909. According to research published in 2010, Liao was sentenced to increasingly punitive prison sentences between 1900 and 1909 under the names "Liu Tianding" (Chinese: 劉添丁) and "Liao Tianding":

Liao/Liu Tianding official list of crimes and sentences
Court	Date	Crime(s)	Sentence	Probation
Taichung	September 19, 1900	Theft	2 mos.	6 mos.
Taichung	April 18, 1901	Theft, violation of probation	3 mos., 15 days	6 mos.
Taichung	September 17, 1901	Violation of probation, attempted theft	10 mos.	6 mos.
Taipei	March 31, 1903	Theft	1 yr, 2 mos.	6 mos.
Taipei	December 14, 1904	Theft	4 yrs.	6 mos.
Taipei	October 18, 1909	Theft	15 yrs.	—
Taipei	November 10, 1909	Murder	Death	—

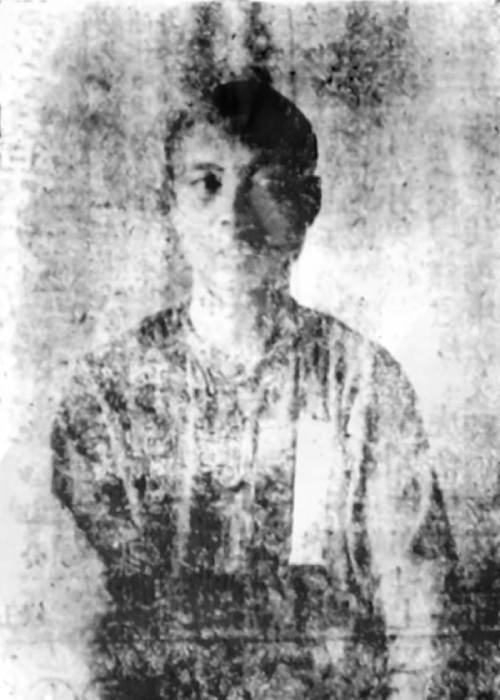
Liao Tianding (taken from report published in Dec. 1909)

In July 1909, Liao began his final campaign of crimes, which included stealing swords, guns, and ammunition from a police station on August 20, killing police "spy" Chen Liang-chiu (陳良久) in Keelung on September 5, and robbing houses belonging to Lin Benyuan (林本源) and the Baozheng (保正) Li Hong (李紅) on November 4. The guns were stolen to prepare for the robbery of Lin Benyuan, according to the confession of Liao's accomplice, Chen Rong (陳榮).

During that final campaign, Liao won fame as the man who could not be caught, thanks to his talent with disguises and the "Black Foot Scarf" (黑腳巾) martial art. According to one story, he survived falling from a moving train into a deep gorge. He also won popular acclaim by giving some of his spoils to the poor; many resented the colonial government but dared not speak out, and his anti-government actions were seen as giving voice to popular sentiments. His actions were called "stealing justly" (盜亦有道), earning him the titles of "righteous outlaw" (義賊) and "grand thief" (俠盜).

The spy Chen Liang-chiu was shot and killed while Liao was escaping a trap: Liao had been lured to a friend's house by Huang A-chi (黃阿赤), who was serving the police secretly and had lied to Liao, falsely promising it was a safe hiding place. The colonial government found Liao guilty of Chen's murder in November and sentenced him to death, forcing him to hide in the mountainous eastern forests. During this time, his mother reportedly was arrested and tortured to death, maintaining her silence instead of revealing his location.

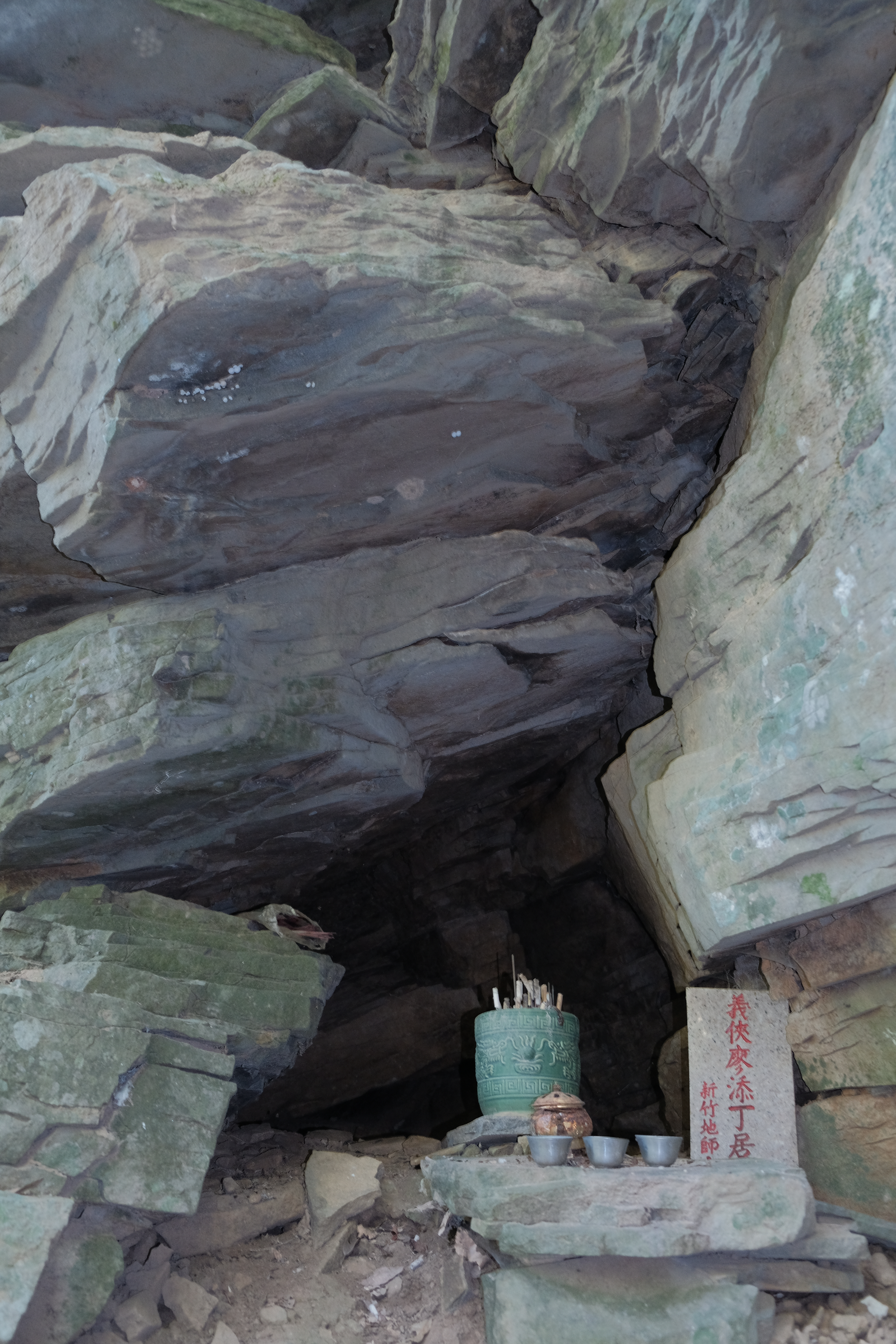
The cave where Liao Tianding was betrayed and killed by Yang Lin (2022)

On November 19, 1909, Liao was betrayed and killed in present-day Bali District, New Taipei City, after sneaking into a cave to avoid the police with an accomplice, Yang Lin (楊林). The cave was near the foot of Guanyin Mountain. The night before, Yang dug up some peanuts and roasted them for Liao to eat; as Liao had been running from the police, he was exhausted and soon fell asleep. Yang snuck away to inform the authorities and brought them back to the cave. As they returned, at approximately 11 am, Liao awoke. When he saw the police just 12 to 15 m (39 to 49 ft) away, Liao roared at Yang "You told them I was here!" then drew his pistol and shot at Yang, but it misfired. Yang then seized a shovel and without hesitation "beat Liao's forehead continuously until his skull was broken", killing him.

Yang Lin's motivations are unclear; it generally is accepted that Yang was seeking the large reward being offered by the police for the capture of Liao, although other sources state he may have been seeking vengeance for the rape of his wife or sister, or simply because he wanted to rob Liao of the gold he was carrying.

=== Mythmaking ===
After authorities recovered Liao's body, they buried him in an unmarked grave nearby. Apocryphal stories began soon after his death; in one, the family of Matsumoto, one of the Japanese officers involved in his pursuit, became ill mysteriously and did not recover until he paid his respects at Liao's gravesite. Matsumoto reportedly paid for a proper headstone and tomb in gratitude, but further worship at the site was banned by the colonial government, and it fell into disrepair.

== Legacy and cultural influence ==
=== Memorials ===
After the war, a small temple was built at the cemetery where Liao was buried, near the present-day intersection of County Route 105 (signed as Zhonghua Road) and Provincial Highway 64. The cave where Liao died is approximately 3 km (1.9 mi) to the south-southeast along County Route 49. A biographical film released in 1956 revived interest in Liao's life, and a more elaborate temple was established at the gravesite in 1958 and completed in the 1970s as Hanmin Temple in Xuntang, Bali Township. It is usually referred to as Liao Tianding Temple, although the main temple hall is dedicated to Guan Gong. Liao has an annex behind the main temple; the gravestone ordered by Matsumoto is on display, bearing the inscription "Meiji 42, November 19th | The tomb of Liao Tianding | Matsumoto Takeyuki" (「明治四十二年十一月十九日 神出鬼沒廖添丁之墳墓 松本建之」).

Hanmin Temple in Bali District, New Taipei City

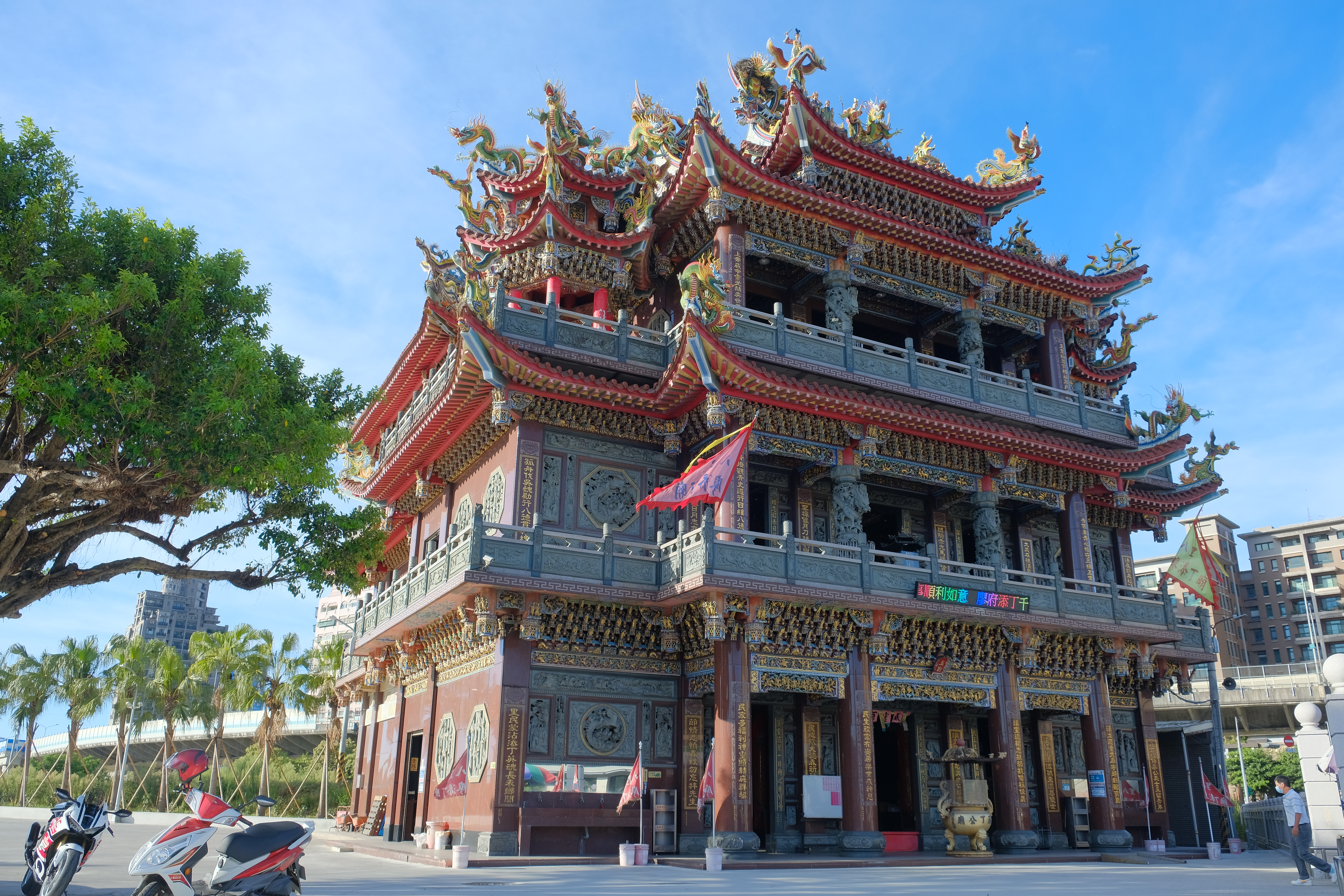
Exterior

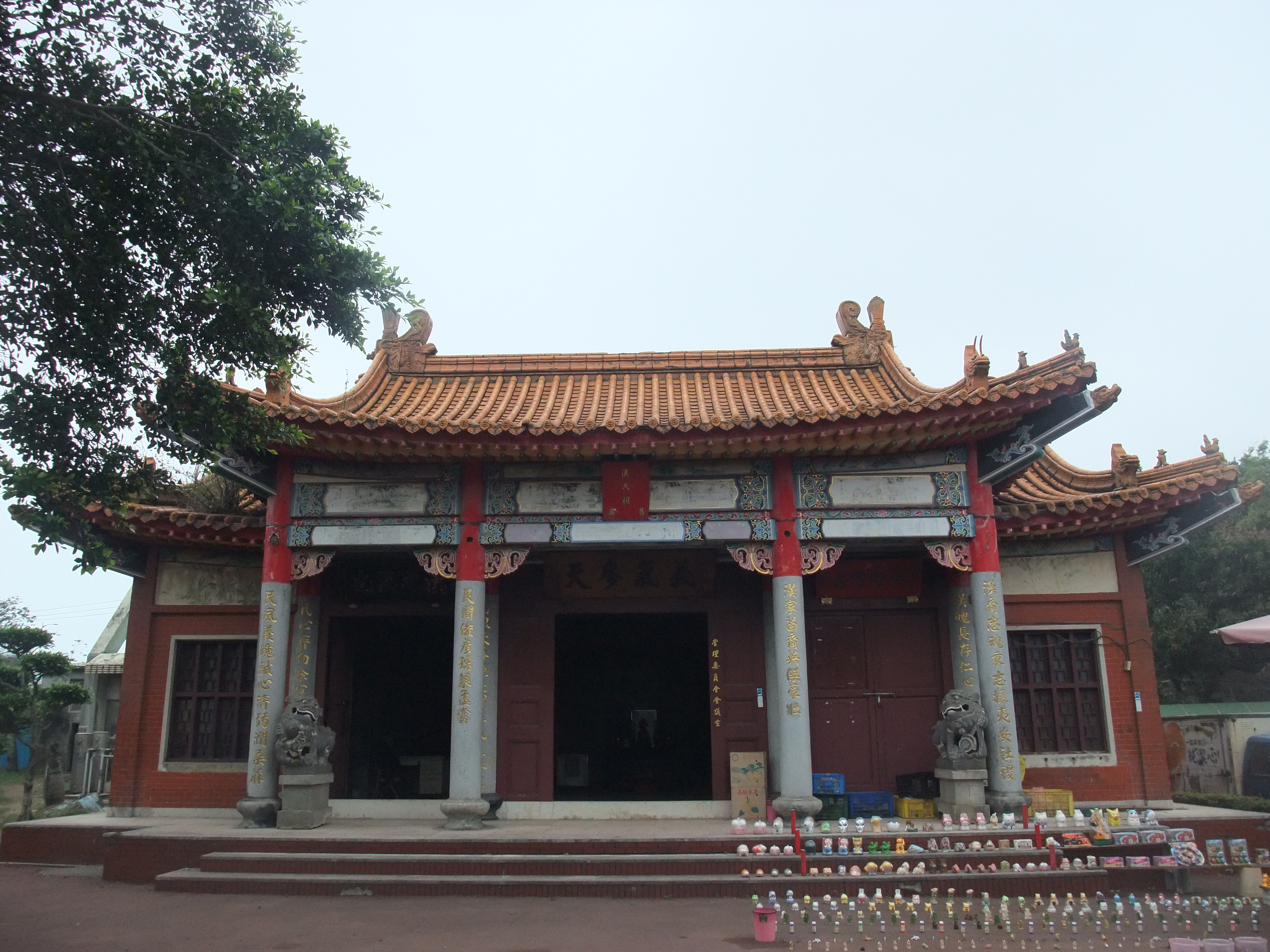
Liao Tianding annex

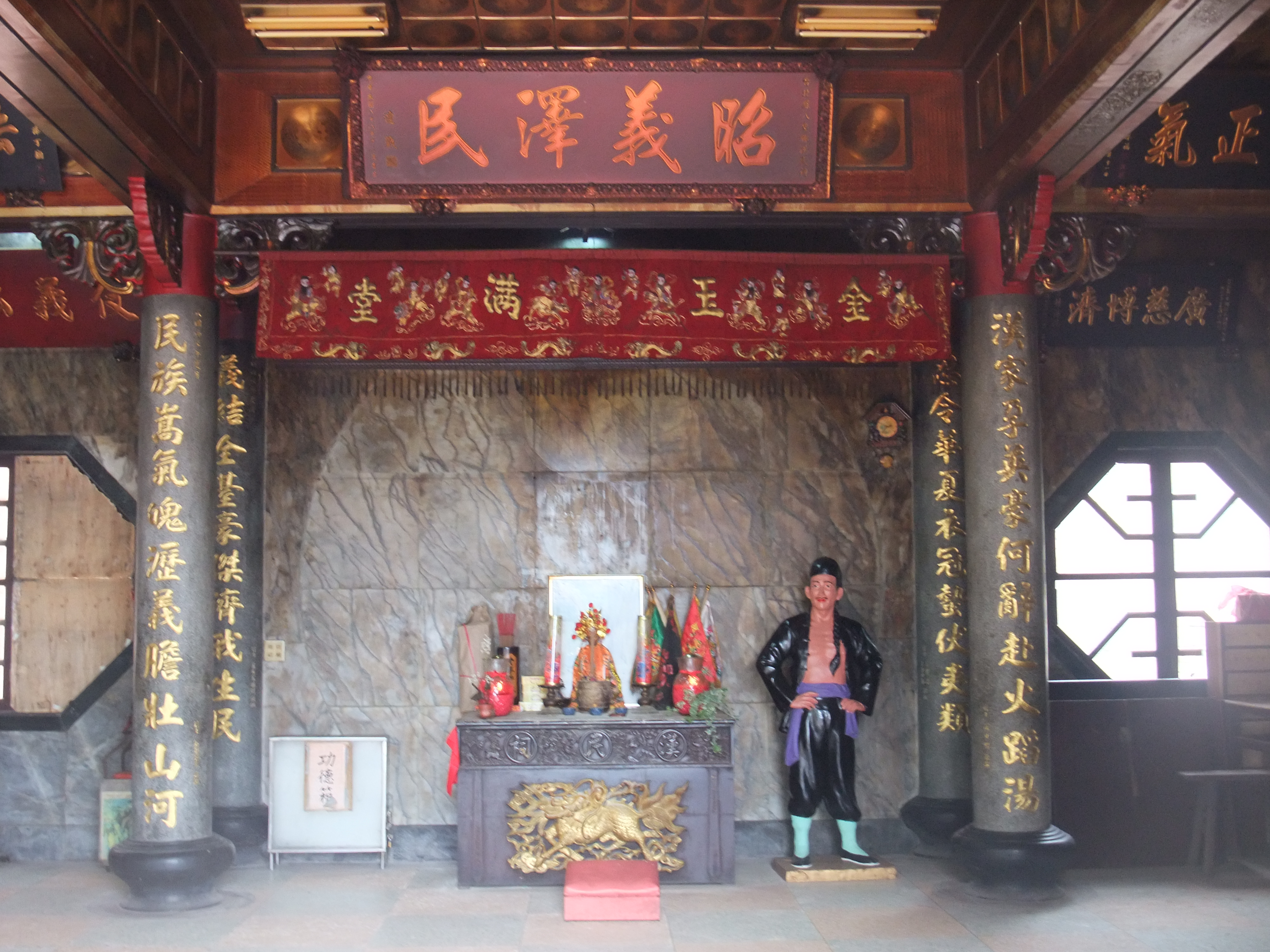
Annex interior, with statue

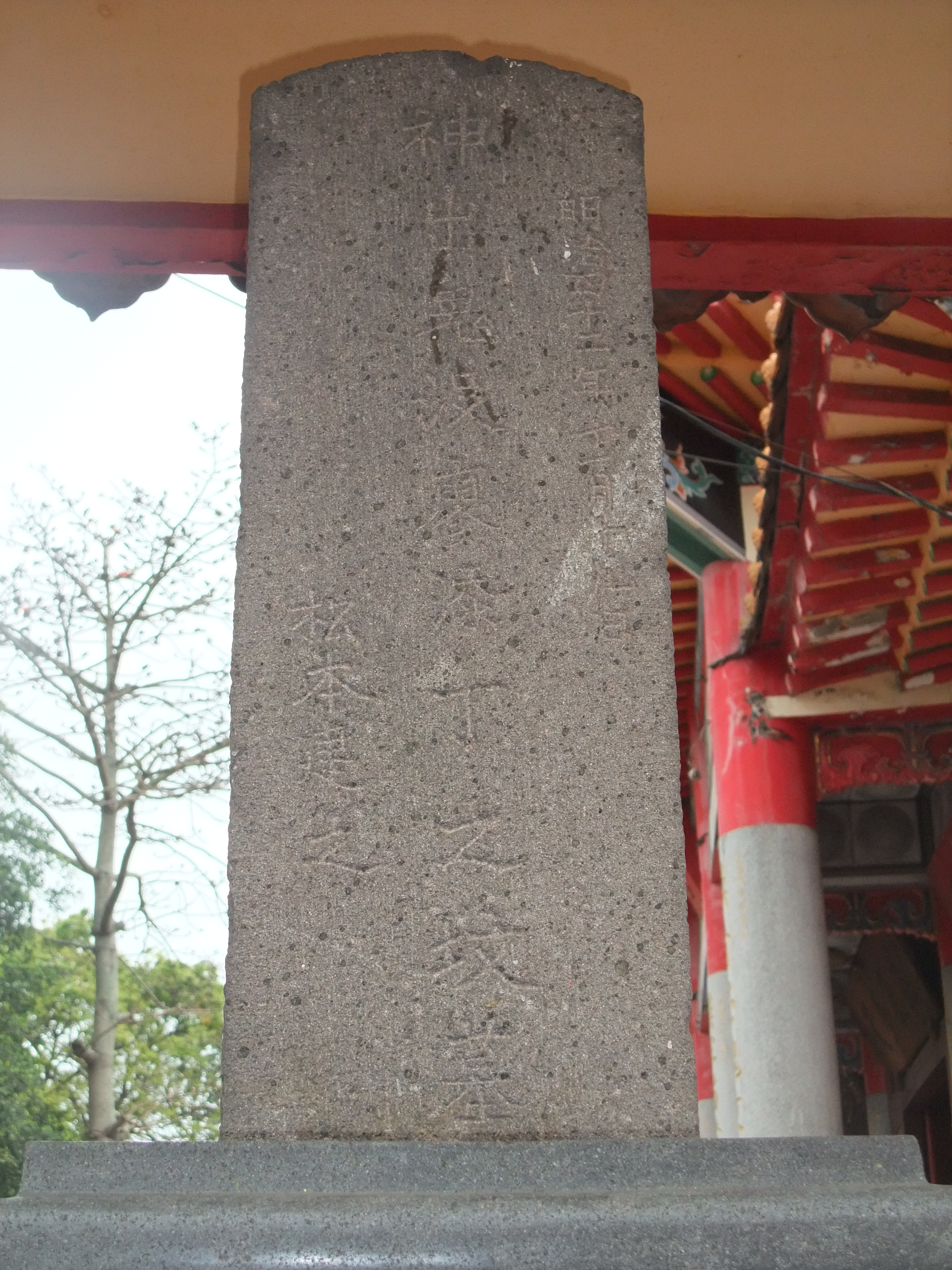
Gravestone

Liao is also venerated at Miaosheng Temple (妙聖宮) in his hometown of Qingshui. A statue of Liao once served as a menshen (threshold guardian) at Wutianchan Shrine (無天禪寺) in New Taipei City's Xindian District opposite Lee Shih-ke, a modern historical robber and murderer who similarly is now revered by some as a folk hero in Taiwan. A statue of Liao is in the collection of Taipei Xia-Hai City God Temple.

=== In art ===
Liao was the subject of a 1911 Japanese play, and by 1914, a Taiwanese opera had branded him a "righteous outlaw".

During the White Terror period of martial law in Taiwan, pirate radio host Wu Letian would recount Liao Tianding's tales; he went on to direct two films on Liao's life, released in 1987 and 1988.

More recently, Liao Tianding was the subject of a modern dance composition by Cloud Gate Dance Theater of Taiwan. He was also the inspiration for Ma Shui-Lung's Liao Tianding Orchestral Suite, which has been recorded by the Prague Symphony Orchestra.

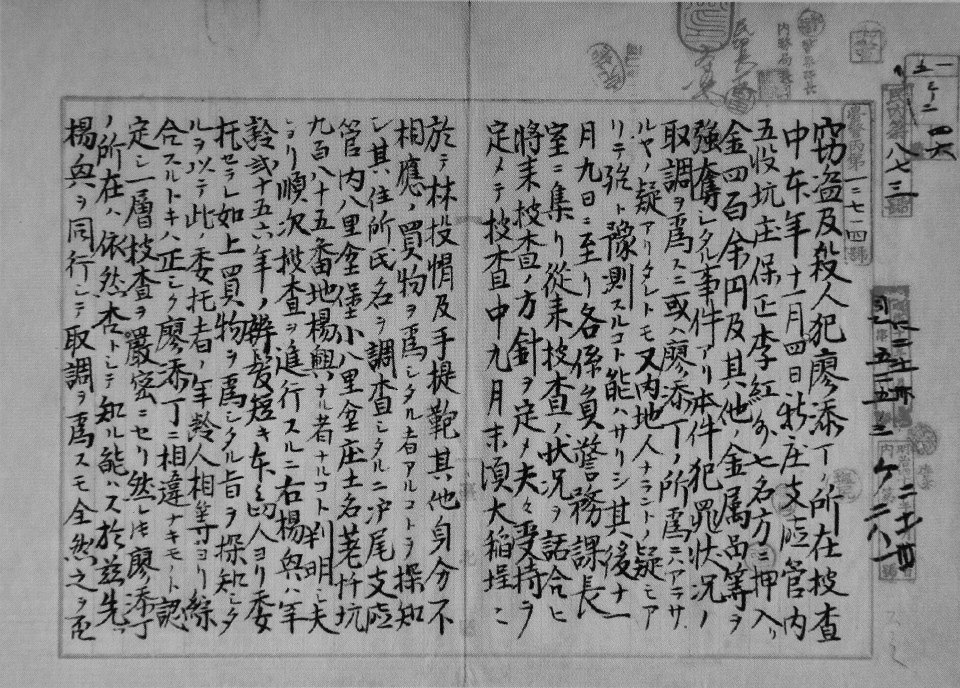
An arrest warrant for Liao Tianding

==== Films ====
- 1956 - Liao Tiending 廖添丁
- 1962 - Youxia Hu Chienming 遊俠胡劍明. The story was based on the life of Liao Tianding, but its release was prohibited until the name was changed.
- 1979 - Legendary Liao Tiending 傳奇人物廖添丁
- 1987 - Taiwanese Hero Liao Tiending 台灣英雄廖添丁. Played by Ling Yun.
- 1988 - Taiwan Hyoukyoku 台灣鏢局. The sequel to Taiwanese Hero Liao Tiending.
- 1998 - Chivalrous Legend 俠盜正傳. Played by Jimmy Lin and Ashton Chen.

==== Television ====
- 1988 - Chinese Folk Tales 中國民間故事
- 1991 - Legend of Liao Tiending 廖添丁傳奇
- 1999 - Taiwan Liao Tiending 台灣廖添丁
- 2002 - A Traditional Story of Taiwan: Liao Tiending 戲說台灣之少年廖添丁

==== Manga ====
- 1995 - Youxia King 俠王傳

==== Book ====
- 2017 - Chivalrous Liao Tiending 義俠廖添丁

==== Video games ====
- 2004 - A Flash game called Shényǐng Wúzōng Liào Tiāndīng (神影無蹤廖添丁) was released in 2004.
- 2021 - The Legend Of Tianding (廖添丁 - 稀代兇賊の最期) is a video game with Liao Tianding as its main character. It was released in November 2021. It is a remake of the 2004 game in collaboration with the original creator.

=== Crowdfunding ===
Red Turtle (紅龜好事群募) is a crowdfunding site based in Taiwan that was founded in April 2014 and is dedicated to social welfare causes. It is named after Liao Tianding's "sworn brother" Red Turtle (紅龜; Hóng guī).
