= Liu Shiyi =

Chinese general (1886–1982)

- 劉士毅
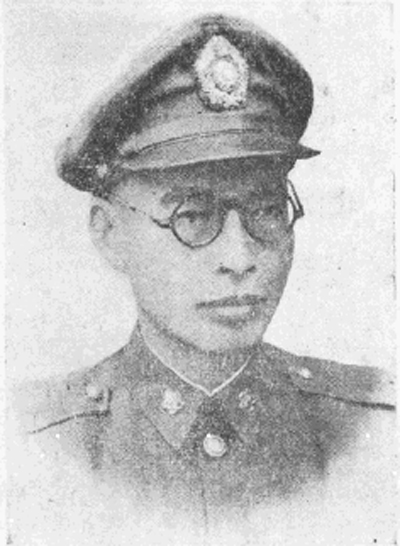
- Liu Shiyi

Deputy Minister of National Defense
- In office 31 May 1946 – 22 June 1948

Personal details
- Born: 31 October 1886 Duchang County, Jiangxi, Qing China
- Died: 5 October 1982 (aged 95) Taipei, Taiwan

Military service
- Allegiance: Qing dynasty; Republic of China
- Branch/service: Jiangxi New Army; National Revolutionary Army; Republic of China Army
- Years of service: 1909–1952
- Rank: Colonel general
- Battles/wars: Xinhai Revolution; Second Revolution; Northern Expedition; Chinese Civil War; Second Sino-Japanese War; Battle of Taierzhuang

Liu Shiyi (traditional Chinese: 劉士毅; simplified Chinese: 刘士毅; pinyin: Liú Shìyì; Wade–Giles: Liu Shih-yi; 31 October 1886 – 5 October 1982) was a Chinese National Revolutionary Army general during the Second Sino-Japanese War.

== Biography ==
Liu was born in Duchang County, Jiangxi in 1886. He entered the Baoding Military Academy in 1909 and was assigned to the Jiangxi New Army as a platoon commander. Liu, along with other rebelling Jiangxi New Army officers, supported revolutionary Li Liejun's appointment as governor of Jiangxi during the Xinhai Revolution. He then commanded troops in entering Hubei to support the revolution there. He participated in the Second Revolution and fled to Japan after the rebellion was crushed by Yuan Shikai's forces, not returning until Yuan's death in 1916. He went back to Japan in the same year to study first at a military school, and later at the University of Tokyo. He returned to China in 1922, first going to Guangzhou and later to Jiangxi to serve as the Jiangxi Army's chief of staff.

Liu joined the National Revolutionary Army in 1926 and participated in the Northern Expedition. He became the chief of staff of the 14th Army and deputy commander of the 2nd Division; he was promoted to commander of the 2nd Division after its previous commander Lai Shihuan was executed by Bai Chongxi's orders for being connected to the Wuhan Nationalist government. He was later sent to suppress the Chinese Red Army in Jiangxi.

During the Central Plains War, Liu planned to launch a mutiny against the Nationalist government, but his plan was discovered and he fled to Japan. At Bai Chongxi's request, he returned to China in 1931 after the Mukden incident. With the outbreak of the Second Sino-Japanese War, Liu was given command of the 31st Army and participated in the Battle of Taierzhuang. He became deputy director of the Military Training Departmant of the Military Affairs Commission in 1939 and was promoted to lieutenant general in 1940.

After the end of the war with Japan, Liu became the Deputy Minister of National Defense, a position he held until 1948. (Note: From 1946–1950, there were multiple Deputy Ministers of National Defense.) He was promoted to colonel general in 1949, being the last officer to receive such a promotion before the Nationalist government relocated to Taiwan. He retired in 1952, becoming an advisor to the Office of the President. He died in Taipei on 5 October 1982, shortly before his 96th birthday.
