= Chen Ching-yu =

Chinese politician

- 陳慶瑜
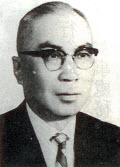

Minister of Finance of the Republic of China
- In office 14 December 1963 – 28 November 1967
- Preceded by: Yen Chia-kan
- Succeeded by: Yu Kuo-hwa

Personal details
- Born: 1899 Changshu
- Died: 12 July 1981 (aged 81–82) Taipei
- Party: Kuomintang
- Education: Nanjing Higher Normal School, 1920

Chen Ching-yu (Chinese: 陳慶瑜; pinyin: Chén Qìngyú) was a fiscal official and politician of the government of the Republic of China. He was from Changshu, Jiangsu. He served as the Minister of the Ministry of Finance for the Republic of China between 1963 and 1967.

== Biography ==
First, he was a design member of the Nanjing Kuomintang Government Construction Committee. He later became the county magistrate of Lishui, Jiangsu. He was later appointed Secretary-General of the Executive Yuan, serving from 1954 to 1958.
