= Lin Chen-hua =

Taiwanese baseball player

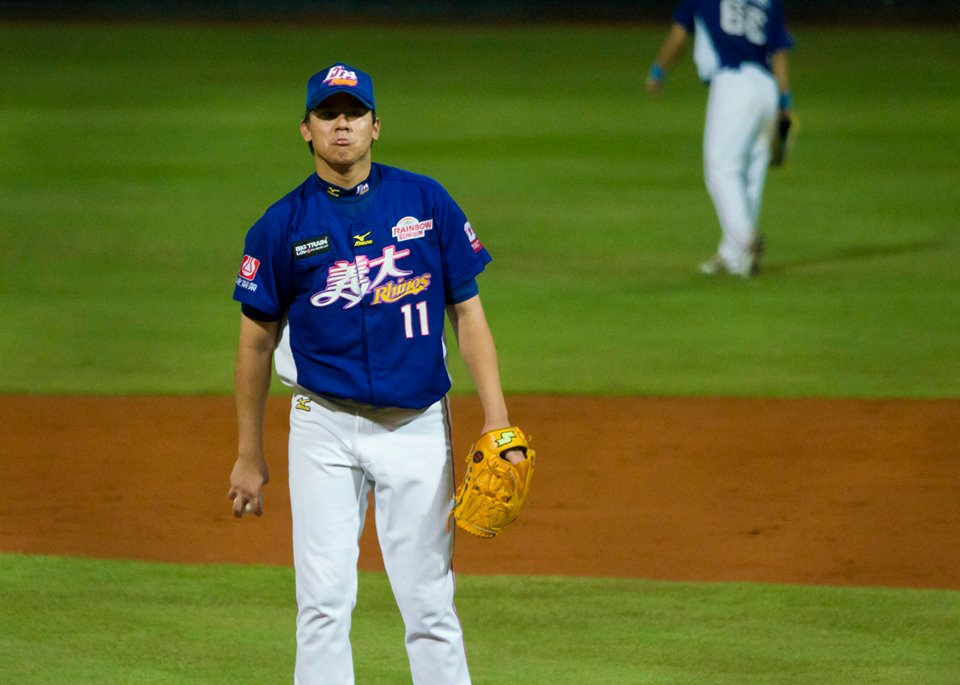
- Pitcher
- Born: 16 December 1988 (age 37); Kaohsiung City, Taiwan
- Bats: Right Throws: Right

CPBL debut
- April 1, 2012, for the Sinon Bulls

CPBL statistics
- Win–loss record: 33–32
- Earned run average: 4.86
- Strikeouts: 356
- Stats at Baseball Reference

Teams
- Sinon Bulls/EDA Rhinos/Fubon Guardians (2012–2021)

Career highlights and awards
- Taiwan Series champion (2016)

Lin Chen-hua (born 16 December 1988) is a Taiwanese baseball Pitcher for the Fubon Guardians of the Chinese Professional Baseball League (CPBL). He attended Chinese Culture University and was the first overall pick in the 2011 CPBL draft by the Sinon Bulls.

Lin represented Taiwan at 2009 World Port Tournament, 2009 Asian Baseball Championship, 2010 Haarlem Baseball Week, 2010 World University Baseball Championship, 2010 Intercontinental Cup, 2011 World Port Tournament, 2011 The Grand Forks International baseball tournament, 2011 Baseball World Cup and the 2017 World Baseball Classic.
