= Lin Yi-han =

Taiwanese writer

- 林奕含
- Born: 16 March 1991; Tainan, Taiwan
- Died: 27 April 2017 (aged 26); Songshan, Taipei, Taiwan
- Citizenship: Taiwan (ROC)
- Occupation: Writer
- Writing career
- Language: Mandarin (Chinese)
- Period: February to April 2017
- Genre: Novel
- Notable work: Fang Si-Chi’s First Love Paradise

Lin Yi-han (Chinese: 林奕含; pinyin: Lín Yìhán; 16 March 1991 – 27 April 2017) was a Taiwanese writer.

== Life ==
Lin Yi-han studied at the National Tainan Girls' Senior High School. Her father is a famous dermatologist in Tainan, Taiwan. Throughout her life, she had studied in university twice, first at Taipei Medical University studying medicine, then at National Chengchi University majoring in Chinese literature. She didn't finish her study, as she quit after 14 days and 3 years respectively.

Lin married in 2016, and died of suicide at her apartment in Taipei on April 27, 2017, shortly after the publication of her first and only complete novel Fang Si-Qi's First Love Paradise (房思琪的初戀樂園), which tells a story of a teenage girl being sexually abused by her tutor. After the author's death, a statement made by her parents suggested that the novel was based on the author's own experiences. The book's publication contributed towards Taiwan's #MeToo movement.

Lin suffered from depression after turning 17 and attempted suicide three times in the following years. Members of the public suspect that the misfortune that befalls the main character of her sole novel may be based on the lasting effect of a sexual assault that Lin might have experienced. She had asserted before, "every day there are only 3 things which come into my mind, whether I should eat, take sedative, or take my life!"

Lin's parents and social media users accused a well-known cram school teacher, Chen Guo-Xing (陈国星), of being the real abuser behind the book, to which the man denied. Despite denial of involvement with Lin, he changed his name to Chen Xing (陈星). Charges against him were eventually dropped due to a lack of evidence for coercion, having sex with a minor, and inconclusive medical records. Nonetheless, William Lai, then mayor of Tainan, said that the accused tutor bears a moral responsibility.

After Lin's death, the Taiwanese government established a law requiring the legal names of tutors at cram schools to be accessible to the public.
