= Liu Keng-shin =

Taiwanese baseball player

Brother Elephants – No. 10
- Short stop
- Born: 24 January 1982 (age 44); Taiwan
- Bats: Right Throws: Right

CPBL debut
- March 21, 2006, for the Brother Elephants

Career statistics (through 2008)
- Batting average: .210
- Home runs: 2
- Runs batted in: 49
- Stats at Baseball Reference

Teams
- Brother Elephants (2006–present)

Liu Keng-shin (alternately Geng-Shin Liou; Chinese: 劉耿欣; born 24 January 1982, in Taiwan) is a Taiwanese baseball player. He played for the Brother Elephants of the Chinese Professional Baseball League. He played shortstop.

== Career statistics ==
Season	Team	G	AB	H	HR	RBI	SB	BB	SO	RBI	DP	AVG
2006	Brother Elephants	73	209	33	2	16	6	18	43	44	1	0.158
2007	Brother Elephants	84	268	67	0	26	8	20	48	80	6	0.250
2008	Brother Elephants	39	85	16	0	7	4	10	48	17	1	0.211
Total	3 years	196	533	116	2	49	17	42	101	141	8	0.210

== See also ==
- Chinese Professional Baseball League
- Brother Elephants
