= Huang Cheng-wei =

Taiwanese baseball player

Brother Elephants – No. 9
- Central Fielder
- Born: 11 February 1984 (age 42); Taiwan
- Bats: Right Throws: Right

CPBL debut
- April 25, 2006, for the Brother Elephants

Career statistics (through 2008)
- Batting average: .263
- Home runs: 4
- Runs batted in: 67
- Stolen bases: 41
- Stats at Baseball Reference

Teams
- Brother Elephants (2006–present)

Huang Cheng-wei (Chinese: 黃正偉; pinyin: Huáng Zhèngwěi; born 11 February 1984 in Taiwan) is a Taiwanese baseball player who played for the Brother Elephants of the Chinese Professional Baseball League. He currently plays as Central Fielder for the Elephants. In the 2008 season, he won the Golden Glove Award.

== Career statistics ==
Season	Team	G	AB	H	HR	RBI	SB	BB	SO	TB	DP	AVG
2006	Brother Elephants	57	168	40	0	10	5	8	28	44	1	0.238
2007	Brother Elephants	94	352	104	2	27	18	19	64	121	10	0.295
2008	Brother Elephants	97	339	82	2	30	18	35	57	103	5	0.242
Total	3 years	248	859	226	4	67	41	62	149	268	16	0.263

== Awards ==
- CPBL Golden Glove Award (2008)

== See also ==
- Chinese Professional Baseball League
- Brother Elephants
