= Hitron =

Taiwanese telecommunication equipment supplier

Hitron Technologies Inc. 仲琦科技股份有限公司
- Type: Public
- Traded as: TWSE: 2419
- Industry: Telecommunication Industry
- Founded: 30 March 1986; 40 years ago
- Headquarters: Hsinchu City, Taiwan
- Key people: April Huang (Chairman of the Board)
- Products: Internet service supplier and equipment manufacturer cable modem & gateway WiFI Extender; PON ONT/ONU coax network testing tool software solution
- Number of employees: 425
- Website: http://www.hitrontech.com

Hitron Technologies (Chinese: 仲琦科技; pinyin: Zhòngqí Kējì) is a Taiwanese company founded in 1986 as a telecommunication equipment supplier and headquartered in Hsinchu City, Taiwan.

== History ==
- In March 1986, Hitron founded on agency of electronic equipment. It begin with 9 employees and NT$8,000,000 in capital.
- In 1987, Hitron entered IT and communication industries.
- In 1989, Hitron entered in the field of GIS.
- In 1996, Hitron constructed HtNet to provide dial-up internet access service as an Internet service provider. The URL is www.ht.net.tw then.
- In 1997, Hitron entered in wireless transmission market.
- In December 1998, IPO on Taiwan's OTC
- In September 2000, listing of shares switched to Taiwan's main board.
- In December 2000, Hitron released 70% share of APOL to EBT.
- In 2001, Hitron started using the 2nd generation Corporate Identity System.
- In November 2002, Hitron began to build up the factory in Hsinchu Science Park.
- In 2003, Digital Media Department in Hitron is independent as Interactive Digital Technologies, Inc.
- In 2005, wholly owned subsidiary launched in Suzhou, China
- In 2010, office opened in Shenzhen, China
- In 2011, office opened in Amsterdam, the Netherlands
- In 2011, first American office opened in Denver, United States
- In 2012, SI spun off from Hitron as IDT
- In 2015, Hitron started using the 3rd generation Corporate Identity System
- In 2015, new factory expansion in Suzhou, China
- In 2015, wholly owned subsidiary: InnoAuto Technologies Inc. launched in Hsinchu County, Taiwan. Expanded to Automotive electronics industry.
- In 2016, 30th Anniversary
- In 2019, received investment from Alpha Networks
- In 2020, started operating new manufacturing center in Haiphong, Vietnam

== Products- Cable Broadband ==
- Cable CPE: Cable Modem, eMTA, Wireless Gateway, Wireless Voice, Gateway IPTV
- Home Networking devices: Wifi Extender, MoCA ECB
- Module: DOCSIS 2.0, DOCSIS 3.0, DOCSIS 3.1
- Infrastructure: Outdoor Cable Modem, Proactive Network, Management System, DOCSIS Probe
- 5G Small Cell Backhaul Solutions
- Coax Network Testing Tools
