= Zhaga Consortium =

- Formation: 2010
- Purpose: Standardizing interfaces of components of LED luminaires, including LED light engines, LED modules, LED arrays, holders, electronic control gear (LED drivers) and connectivity fit systems. This helps to streamline the LED lighting supply chain, and to simplify LED luminaire design and manufacturing. Zhaga continues to develop specifications based on the inter-related themes of interoperable components, smart and connected lighting, and serviceable luminaires.
- Members: Zhaga's member companies include LED luminaire makers; manufacturers of LED modules, LED drivers and LED light engines; suppliers of materials and components, and testing labs
- General Secretary: Dee Denteneer
- Website: http://www.zhagastandard.org

The Zhaga Consortium is an international organization, founded in February 2010, establishing industry specifications of interfaces for components used in LED luminaires. As of February 2021 it has more than 300 members. The consortium is a member program of the IEEE Industry Standards and Technology Organization (IEEE-ISTO.) Zhaga's specifications, which are called Books, address electrical, mechanical, optical, thermal and communication interfaces and allow the interoperability of components. Results of Zhaga specifications are that components are interoperable and can be replaced or serviced and that a LED luminaire can be upgraded after installation when new technology is available.

The Zhaga consortium has established a logo program to indicate compatibility with these standards through a program of certification and testing. Only certified products are allowed to carry the Zhaga logo.
