= Ting Chin-Pan =

Chinese general (1894–1988)

- 丁治磐
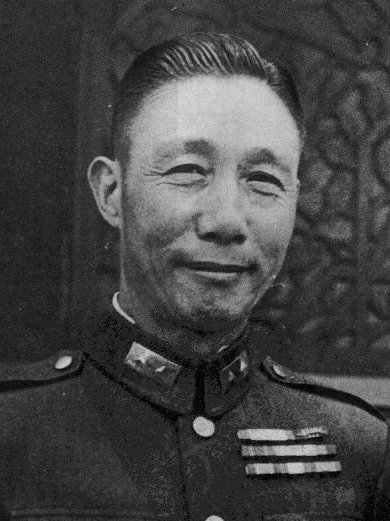

Personal details
- Born: 19 January 1894 Donghai County, Jiangsu, Qing dynasty
- Died: 8 March 1988 (aged 94) Taipei, Taiwan
- Party: Kuomintang

Military service
- Allegiance: Republic of China
- Branch/service: (Republic of China (1912–1949)) National Revolutionary Army
- Battles/wars: Northern Expedition; Second Sino-Japanese War; Chinese Civil War

Ting Chin-pan (Chinese: 丁治磐; pinyin: Dīng Zhìpán; 19 January 1894 – 8 March 1988), also known by his courtesy names Si’an and Shi’an, and his studio name Buxianzhai, was a soldier, poet and calligrapher.

== Biography ==
=== Early life ===
Ding Zhipan was born in Donghai County, Jiangsu, during the Qing Dynasty. His original name was Jieshi, but he changed his name after joining the army. He took the imperial examination in the late Qing Dynasty. On the eve of the Xinhai Revolution, he had just graduated from the Jiangnan Higher School in Nanjing when he joined the army under Gu Zhongchen. In March 1912, he was admitted to the first class of the infantry department of the Jiangsu Army Academy. In November, he graduated and was awarded the rank of second lieutenant. He was assigned to serve as a platoon leader in the brigade of Zhao Nianbo (Zhao Sheng's younger brother) of the 16th Army Division. In November 1916, after graduating from the first class of the Jiangsu Army Officer Training Corps, he served in the 151st Infantry Regiment of the 76th Mixed Brigade of the Army (with Zhang Renkui as the brigade commander and the Tongzhou garrison commander), stationed in Nantong and Haimen.

=== Northern Expedition ===
During the Northern Expedition, he served as the Colonel Chief of Staff of Xu Yuanquan's Zhilu Allied Forces. In the winter of 1928, Xu Yuanquan's forces were reduced to the 48th Division, and Ding was transferred to Hubei with Xu's division. In December 1929, Xu Yuanquan's forces were reorganized into the 10th Army of the National Revolutionary Army, and Ding served as the Chief of Staff of the Army. In May 1931, he served as the commander of the 121st Brigade of the 41st Division of the 10th Army, and was a colleague of Huang Baitao. He participated in the "encirclement and suppression" of the Hunan-Hubei-West Soviet Area and the Hubei-Henan-Anhui Soviet Area. On December 7, 1931, Ding Zhipan was awarded the Third Class Baoding Medal. On April 20, 1933, Ding Zhipan was awarded the Second Class Baoding Medal. In October 1933, he was admitted to the 12th term of the Army University. After graduation in November 1936, he returned to serve as the Chief of Staff of the 10th Army.

=== Second Sino-Japanese War ===
During the Second Sino-Japanese War, on November 9, 1937, he was appointed Lieutenant General and Commander of the 41st Army Division. On January 26, 1942, he was promoted to Lieutenant General and Commander of the 26th Army. In the autumn and winter of 1944, he was dismissed but retained his position because of his poor command of the 26th Army which led to the defeat in Liuzhou. He resumed his post in May 1945 and served concurrently as deputy commander-in-chief of the 27th Army Group. On December 4, 1945, he was appointed Deputy Commander of the Fourth Army Front. On December 13, 1945, he was appointed Deputy Commander of the Second Pacification Zone. In the spring of 1946, he went to Qingdao to set up the Jiaodong Command of the Second Pacification Zone and served as the Qingdao Garrison Commander. In December 1947, the 11th Pacification Zone was established and he served as the Pacification Commander, covering the area east of Weixian County, Shandong Province.

=== Chinese Civil War ===
On September 1, 1948, he succeeded Wang Maogong as the chairman of the Jiangsu Provincial Government and the commander of the security. Xu Daolin, the son of Xu Shuzhen, was appointed as the secretary general of the provincial government. In early 1949, he concurrently served as the deputy commander-in-chief of the Beijing-Shanghai-Hangzhou Security Command (commander Tang Enbo) and the chairman of the Jiangsu Provincial Party Committee of the Kuomintang. On February 21, 1949, Chen Yi, the chairman of Zhejiang Province, was arrested, and Zhou Yu, the commander of the First Suijing District, took over as the chairman of Zhejiang Province. Ding Zhipan concurrently served as the commander of the First Suijing District. During the Battle of Crossing the Yangtze River in April 1949, the Provisional First Army of the National Revolutionary Army formed by the local forces of Jiangsu Province completely withdrew from Chongming Island to Shengsi Islands. He led the Jiangsu Provincial Government on Gouqi Island, formed the "Jiangsu People's Anti-Communist Self-Defense and National Salvation Army" as the commander-in-chief, and sent army-building cadres to the inland.

=== Taiwan ===
After the central government moved to Taiwan, he served as national policy advisor to the Presidential Office. He served as the honorary director of the Institute of Poetics of the Chinese Academy of Sciences. On March 8, 1988, he died of broken bones in a fall at the Taipei Veterans General Hospital at the age of 95. He was buried on April 21 of that year at Wanshoushan Cemetery in Wanli Township, Taipei County.

He wrote "Ding Zhipan's Diary", "Buxianzhai Poetry Draft", "Buxianzhai Collection" and so on.

== Family ==
He had two sons and two daughters.
