= Federation of Medical Students-Taiwan =

Federation of Medical Students-Taiwan FMS-Taiwan
- Formation: 11 August 1988
- Type: Student organisation
- Headquarters: Taipei city
- Location: Taiwan (Republic of China)
- Members: appx. 10,000 medical students (13 universities, 17 departments in Taiwan)
- Official language: Traditional Chinese, English
- President at present: Yen-Hao Chu (Isaac)
- Website: fmstw.org

The Federation of Medical Students in Taiwan (FMSTW; Chinese: 台灣醫學生聯合會), as the representative of all the medical students in Taiwan, consists of 12 medical colleges, including 16 departments of medicine, post-baccalaureate medicine, Chinese medicine, post-baccalaureate Chinese medicine. and one observer member. FMSTW also works as a formal member in both International Federation of Medical Students' Associations (IFMSA) and Asian Medical Students' Association (AMSA), representing medical students from Taiwan in all forms of international organisations and campaigns.

== Aims ==
1. Promote interactions among medical students all over the country.
2. Protect and fight for the rights belong to medical students in Taiwan.
3. Integrate medical students in Taiwan to make good contributions to society.
4. Participate in international affairs as a deputation of medical students in Taiwan.

== See also ==
- List of medical schools in Taiwan
