= Lin Chih-hsiang =

Taiwanese baseball player

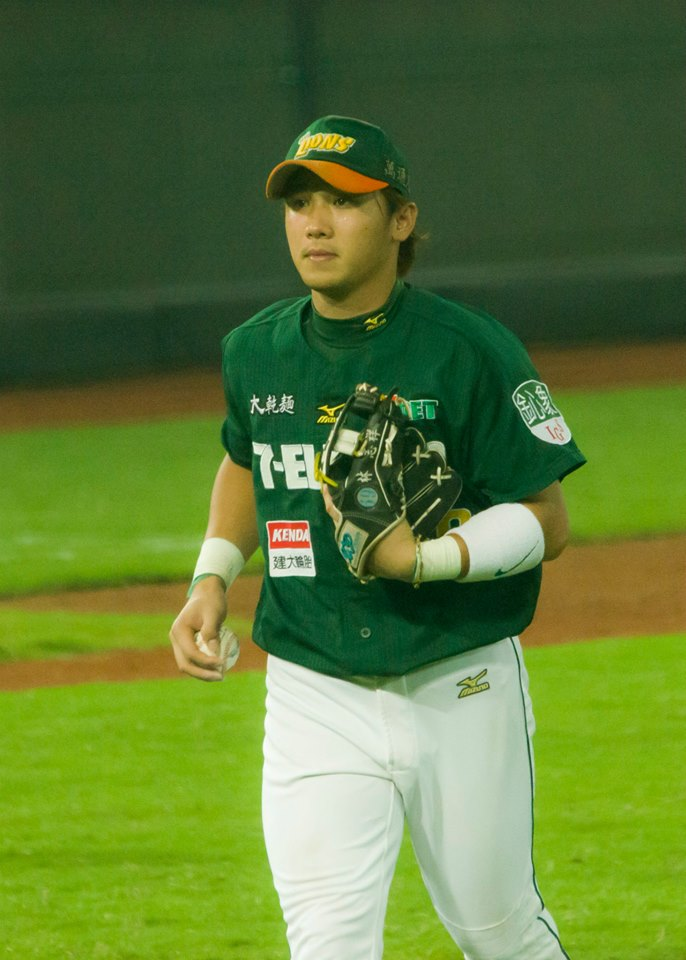
- Lin with the Uni-President 7-Eleven Lions
- Second baseman
- Born: 8 March 1987 (age 39); Taitung County, Taiwan
- Bats: Left Throws: Right

CPBL statistics
- Batting average: .299
- Home runs: 24
- Runs batted in: 299
- Stats at Baseball Reference

Teams
- Uni-President 7-Eleven Lions (2011–2017)

Lin Chih-hsiang (born 8 March 1987) is a Taiwanese former baseball second baseman who had played with the Uni-President 7-Eleven Lions in the Chinese Professional Baseball League (CPBL). He was drafted by the Lions in 2009 and won the CPBL's Gold Glove Award from 2014 to 2016.

Lin represented Taiwan at the 2006 World University Baseball Championship, 2008 World University Baseball Championship, 2008 Haarlem Baseball Week, 2009 World Port Tournament, 2009 Asian Baseball Championship, 2009 Italian Baseball Week, 2009 Baseball World Cup, 2012 Asian Baseball Championship and 2017 World Baseball Classic.
