= Jass Yang =

Jass Yang 楊威宇
- Born: 3 February 1991 (age 35)
- Occupations: Singer, lyricist, composer, producer
- Years active: 2013–present
- Agent: Rock Records (2006–2016)
- Musical career
- Genres: Rock, folk, pop music, and electronic
- Instruments: Piano, electric guitar, audio guitar
- Website: jassofficial.com

Jass Yang (Chinese: 楊威宇; pinyin: Yáng Wēiyǔ; born 3 February 1991) is an independent musician and producer from Taiwan. He is the lead singer and guitarist of the Taiwanese band Fun4, and a founding member of the group.

== Career ==
Jass has written songs for many notable Chinese artists. At the age of 15, he became the youngest licensed street performer in Taiwan. At the age of 18, he signed in Rock Records with his band FUN4 and released two EPs. He created the famous song Disdain for the Taiwanese singer Huang HongSheng. In 2014, he released his debut album EXIT and performed all over Asia's major stages, including the 30th anniversary concert of Rock Records in Taipei Arena, the 2013 Taipei New Year's Eve Concert, the SuperSlipper, and also Asian Tours.

In addition to playing the key figure in the rock band, he also extended the music energy to behind-the-scenes production and film scoring. He used to be the producer of Beijing Huayi Brothers' co-operative film and television soundtrack. The representative works of the music include Jiangxi Satellite TV's "Three Bosom Girls" by Jiang Xin, Zhang Xinyi and Tong Yao. Starring, as well as Guangdong Satellite TV "Monthly" starring Guo Jingfei, Zhang Yuxi, Chen He. In 2013, Fun4 debuted with the debut album "Exit".

Some of the Chinese artists who have worked together with Jass Yang in music production and concert production includes Ren Xianqi, Huang Pinyuan, Huang HongSheng, Liu Liyang, Haojiaxiangqi, 2moro, EggPlantEgg茄子蛋, etc.

In 2016, he left Taiwan to work as a producer and mixing engineer in London, England. Under the background of strong Chinese music and the rendering of British electronics, the first fusion of traditional opera and EDM produced a series of REMIX works "Miao Taiwan", and became the first Chinese music producer to be interviewed by the British National Radio BBC, and later combined with the traditional facial design, was shortlisted for the 16th Independent Music Awards.

== Personal life and education ==
Born in New Taipei City, Jass Yang grew up in the area of Nanshijiao in Zhonghe District. He was enrolled in Xingnan Elementary School in Zhonghe District, New Taipei City. He attended Zhonghe Junior High School in Taipei County and then graduated from Taipei Municipal Jianguo High School.

== Awards and recognitions ==
- 2014 – Shortlisted for Singapore Golden Melody Awards for The most popular Group
- 2018 Shortlisted for the 16th American Independent Music Awards IMA
