= Ming-Chin Tsai =

Taiwanese baseball player

Tsai Ming-chin
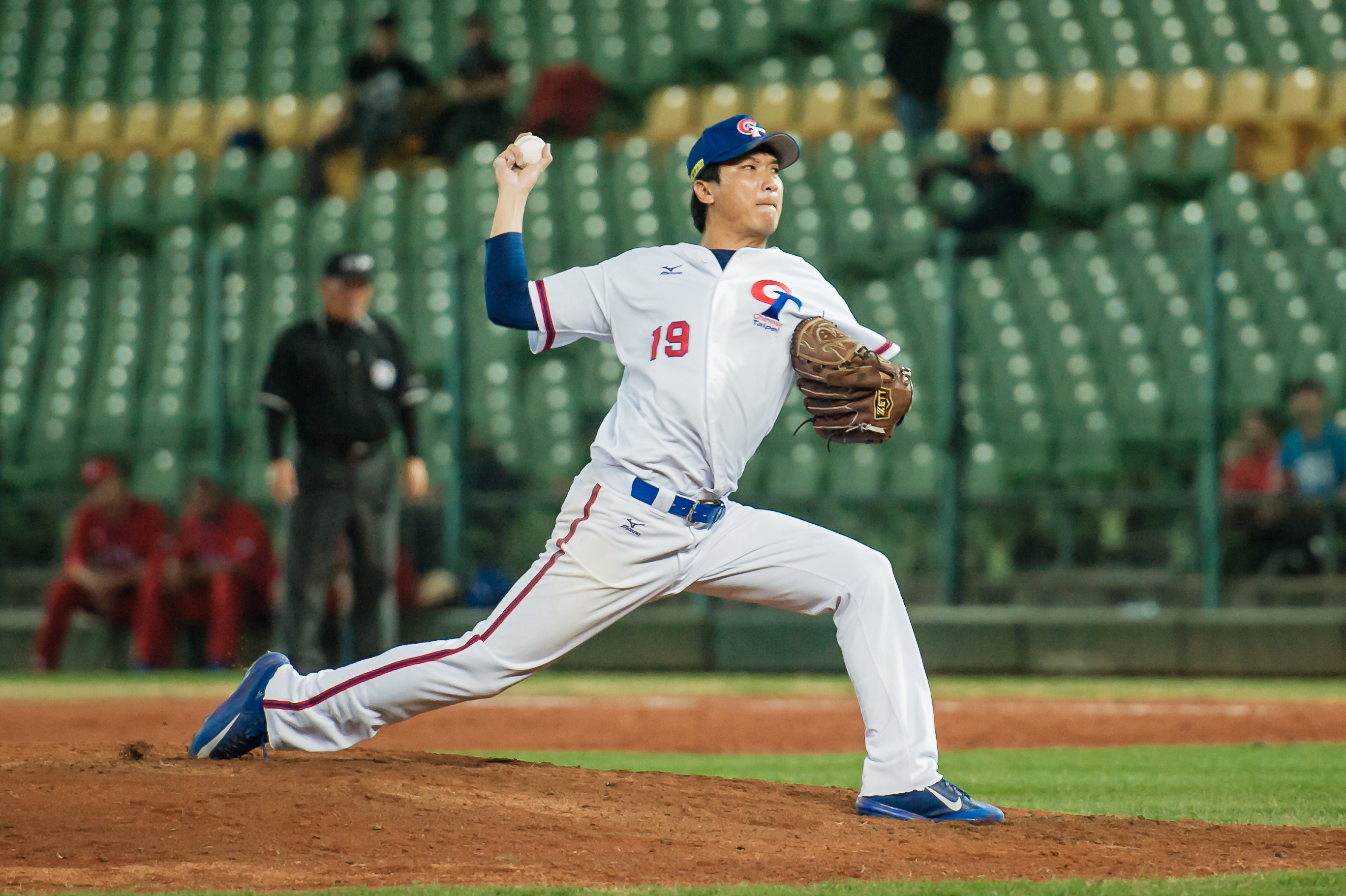
- Tsai in 2017
- Pitcher
- Born: 28 September 1984 (age 41); Tainan City, Taiwan
- Bats: Left Throws: Right

CPBL statistics
- Win–loss record: 37–36
- Earned run average: 4.93
- Strikeouts: 411
- Stats at Baseball Reference

Teams
- Sinon Bulls / EDA Rhinos / Fubon Guardians (2008–2020)

Ming-chin Tsai (born 28 September 1984) is a Taiwanese former baseball pitcher. He attended the National Taiwan University of Physical Education and Sport and was the second round draft pick of the Sinon Bulls in 2006.

Tsai represented Taiwan at the 2017 World Baseball Classic.
