= Institute of Yilan County History =

Institute in Yilan City, Yilan County, Taiwan

- 宜蘭縣史館
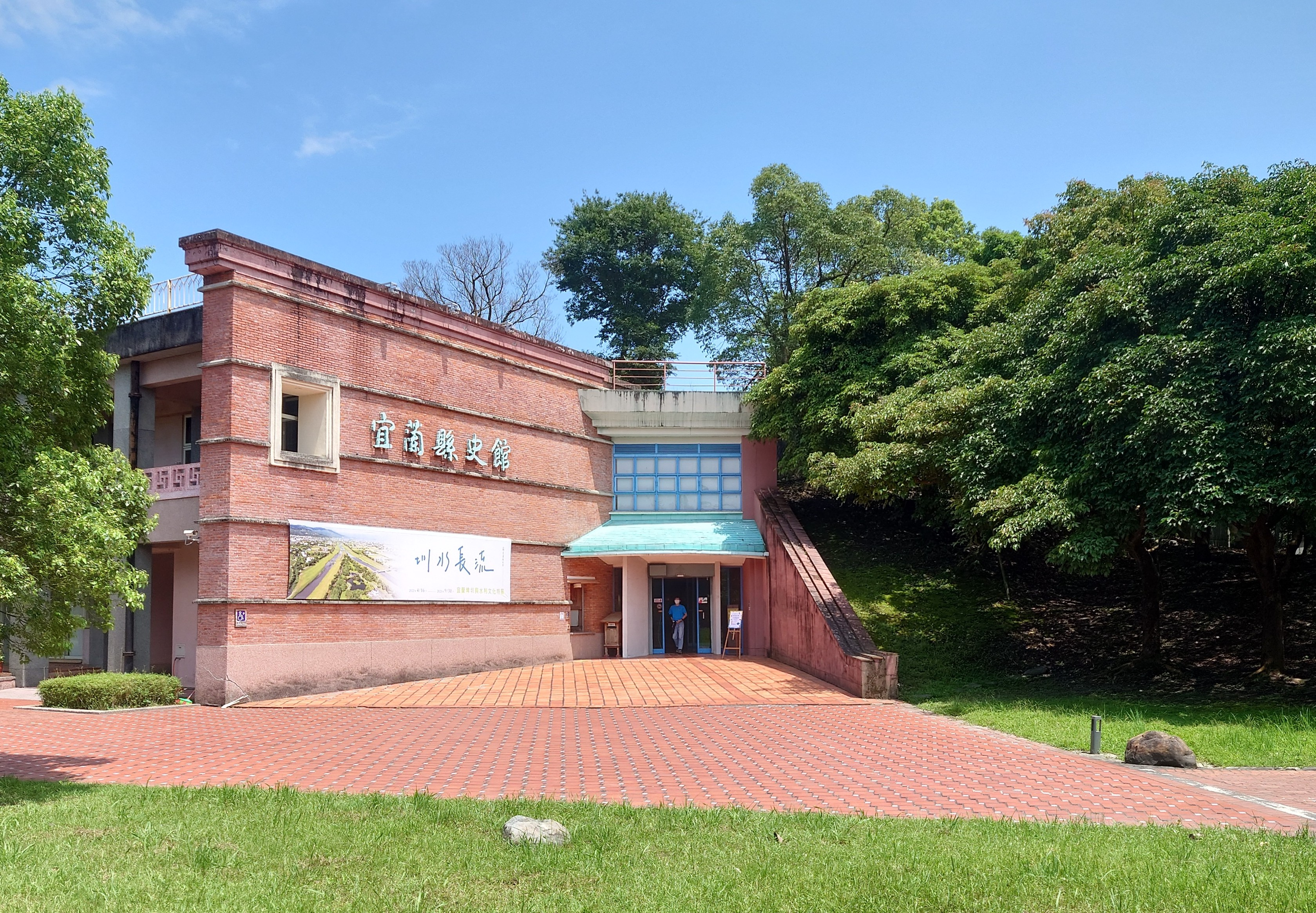
- Interactive map of the Institute of Yilan County History area

General information
- Type: Historical gallery
- Location: Yilan City, Yilan County, Taiwan
- Coordinates: 24°43′51.6″N 121°45′44.0″E
- Completed: 1 January 1992
- Opened: 16 October 2001

Website
- Official website (in Chinese)

The Institute of Yilan County History (IOYCH; traditional Chinese: 宜蘭縣史館; simplified Chinese: 宜兰县史馆; pinyin: Yílán Xiàn Shǐguǎn) is a local institute of history in Yilan City, Yilan County, Taiwan built to collect, access, record, research and promote the local history of Yilan County.

== History ==
IOYCH was originally established on 1 January 1992 and was inaugurated on 16 October 1993. It was moved to its current place on 16 October 2001.

== Exhibitions ==
The institute exhibits collections pertaining the local history of Yilan and also genealogy and artifacts of the local population.

== Activities ==
The institute regularly holds exhibitions, symposiums, seminars and forums about the research of Yilan County.

== See also ==
- List of tourist attractions in Taiwan
