= Nono Ku =

Taiwanese actress and model

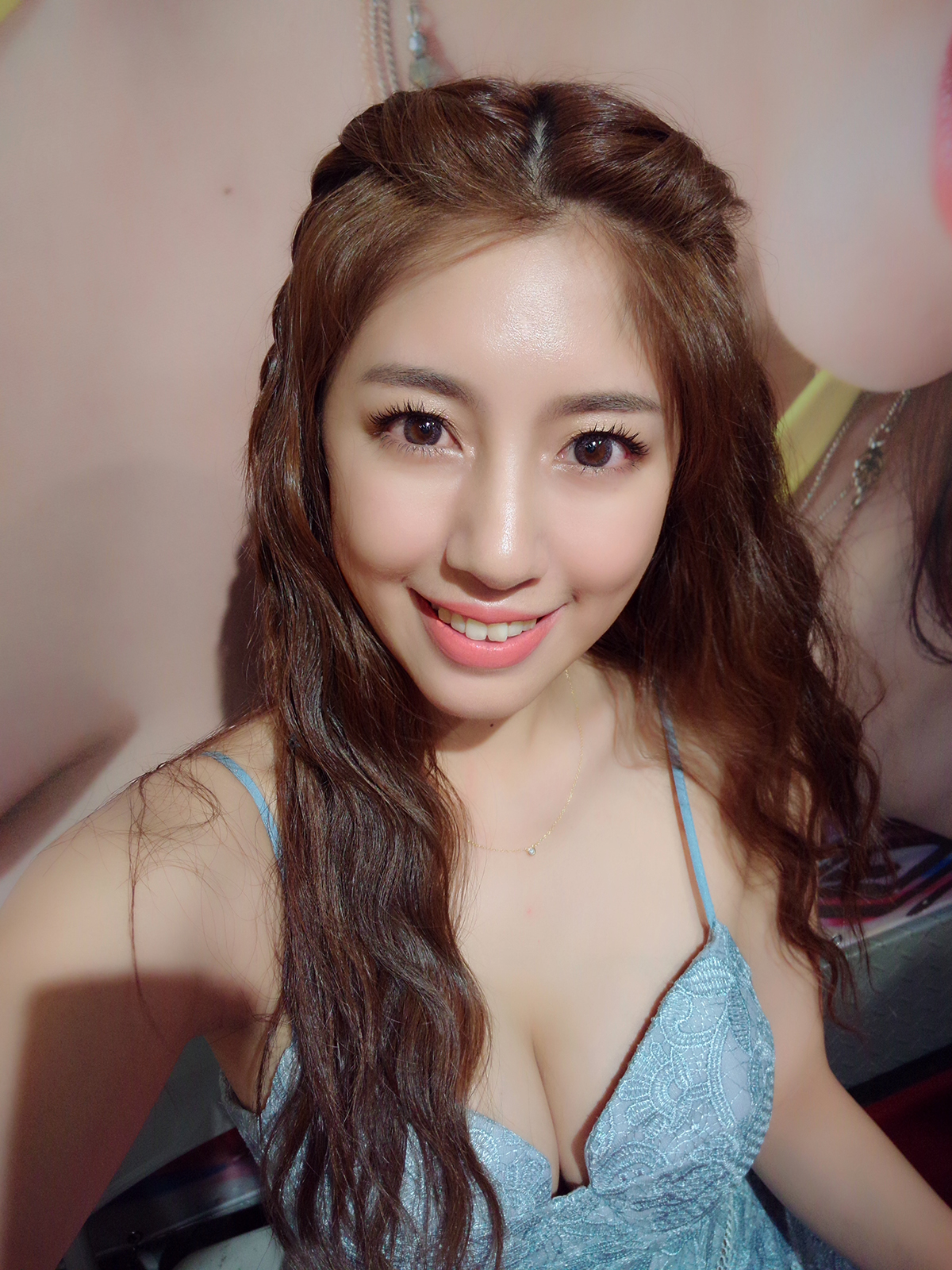
- Born: 16 February 1992 (age 34); Taipei, Taiwan
- Occupations: actress, model

Nono Ku (Chinese: 辜莞允; pinyin: Gū Guǎnyǔn), born as Ku Kuan-yun, is a Taiwanese actress and model.

== Filmography ==
=== Television series ===
Year	English title	Original title	Role	Notes
2015	Ba Ji Teenagers	一代新兵之八極少年	Tsai Yi-hua	
