= Yu Kuo-hwa =

Taiwanese politician and economist (1914–2000)

- 俞國華
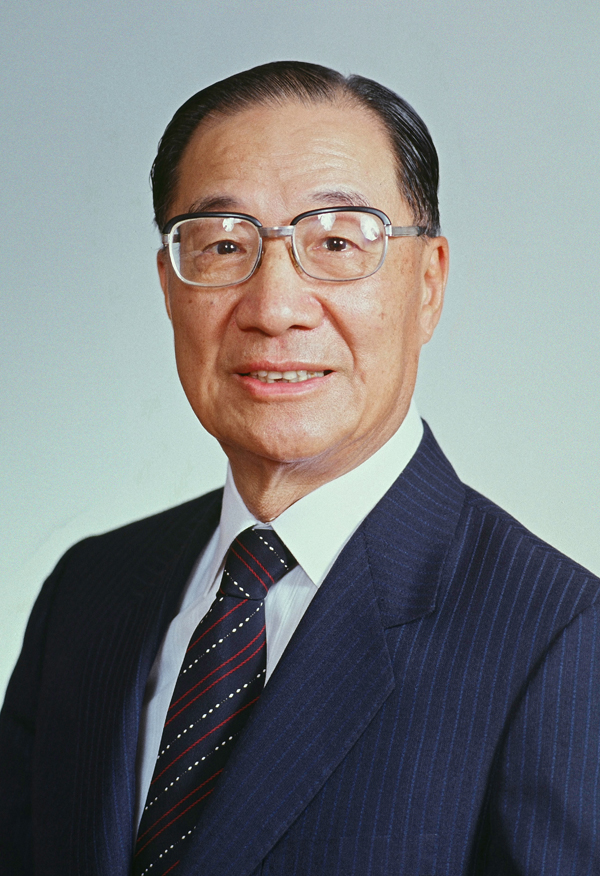

Premier of the Republic of China
- In office 20 May 1984 – 21 May 1989
- President: Chiang Ching-kuo; Lee Teng-hui
- Vice Premier: Lin Yang-kang; Lien Chan
- Preceded by: Sun Yun-suan
- Succeeded by: Lee Huan

Governor of the Central Bank of the Republic of China
- In office 25 June 1969 – 30 May 1984
- Preceded by: Hsu Po-yuan
- Succeeded by: Chang Chi-cheng

Personal details
- Born: 10 January 1914; Ningbo, Zhejiang, Republic of China
- Died: 4 October 2000 (aged 86); Taipei, Taiwan
- Party: Kuomintang
- Education: Tsinghua University (BA); Harvard University (MA); London School of Economics (MSc)

Yu Kuo-hwa
- Traditional Chinese: 俞國華
- Simplified Chinese: 俞国华
Transcriptions
Standard Mandarin
- Hanyu Pinyin: Yú Guóhuá

Yu Kuo-hwa (Chinese: 俞國華; January 10, 1914 – October 4, 2000) was a Taiwanese economist who served as the Premier of the Republic of China from 1984 to 1989.

== Biography ==
Yu was born on 10 January 1914 in Fenghua, Ningbo, Zhejiang, China. After graduating from Tsinghua University in 1934 with a bachelor's degree in political science, he served as an aide to Chiang Kai-shek. Yu then earned a graduate degree in economics at Harvard University, where he studied from 1944 to 1946, and the London School of Economics, where he studied finance from 1946 to 1947.

He was appointed as Minister of Finance on 29 November 1967 and became Governor of the Central Bank of China in 1969.

As Premier, Yu was responsible for ending Taiwan's 38 years of martial law in 1987. In October 1988, he walked out of a meeting of the Legislative Yuan, the first time a government official had done so, as extensive debate made it impossible for Yu to deliver his reports. He died from complications from leukemia at 4pm on 4 October 2000 at the Veterans' General Hospital in Taipei.

Yu was preceded by Sun Yun-suan and succeeded by Lee Huan.

Mr.Yu and Mrs.Yu are buried at the Ferncliff Cemetery, Hartsdale, New York.

== See also ==
- List of premiers of the Republic of China

Government offices
Preceded by Chen Ching-yu	ROC Finance Minister; 1967–1969	Succeeded by Kwoh-Ting Li
Preceded by Sun Yun-suan	Premier of the Republic of China; 1984–1989	Succeeded by Lee Huan
