= 2012 in Taiwan =

- Decades: 1990s; 2000s; 2010s; 2020s
- See also: Other events of 2012; History of Taiwan • Timeline • Years

Events from the year 2012 in Taiwan, Republic of China. This year is numbered Minguo 101 according to the official Republic of China calendar.

== Incumbents ==
- President – Ma Ying-jeou
- Vice President – Vincent Siew, Wu Den-yih
- Premier – Wu Den-yih, Sean Chen
- Vice Premier – Sean Chen, Jiang Yi-huah

== Events ==
=== January ===
- 1 January – The renaming of Council for Hakka Affairs to Hakka Affairs Council.
- 5 January – The opening of Fu Jen University Station, Touqianzhuang Station and Xinzhuang Station of Taipei Metro in Xinzhuang District, New Taipei.
- 14 January
  - 2012 Republic of China presidential election.
  - 2012 Republic of China legislative election.
- 15 January – The officiating ceremony of Xiaolin Village Memorial Park in Jiasian District, Kaohsiung.

=== February ===
- 3 February – The opening of Guo Ziyi Memorial Hall in Neihu District, Taipei.
- 6 February
  - Sean Chen became the Premier of the Republic of China.
  - Jiang Yi-huah became the Vice Premier of the Republic of China.
- 16 February – The visit of Beijing Mayor Guo Jinlong to Taiwan for a 6-day visit.

=== March ===
- 1 March
  - The establishment of Taiwan International Ports Corporation.
  - The establishment of Maritime and Port Bureau.

=== April ===
- 23–29 April 2012 OEC Kaohsiung
- 25–26 April – 2012 Democratic Progressive Party presidential primary.

=== May ===
- 7 May – The visit of Hubei Governor Wang Guosheng to Taiwan for an 8-day visit.
- 12 May – The opening of Miaoli Hakka Cultural Park in Miaoli County.
- 13 May – The opening of Macau Economic and Cultural Office at Taipei 101 in Xinyi District, Taipei City.
- 15 May – The inauguration of Hong Kong Economic, Trade and Cultural Office in Taipei City.
- 20 May
  - Ma Ying-jeou inaugurated as the President of the Republic of China for the second term.
  - Wu Den-yih inaugurated as the Vice President of the Republic of China.
  - The Aviation Safety Council became an independent body from the Executive Yuan.
  - The establishment of Ministry of Culture from the former Council for Cultural Affairs.
  - The disestablishment of Government Information Office.
- 22 May – The establishment of Bureau of Audiovisual and Music Industry Development of the Ministry of Culture.

=== June ===
- 27 June – The opening of the first Taiwanese branch of Bank of China located in Taipei City.
- 30 June at 12:00 Taiwan Time - The digital switchover in Taiwan is completed, and analogue television ended operation.

=== July ===
- 7 July – Referendum for casinos establishment in Lienchiang County which 56% voters voted in favor.

=== August ===
- 5 August – The East China Sea Peace Initiative proposed by President Ma Ying-jeou.
- 11 August – The opening of Yeh Shih-tao Literature Memorial Hall in West Central District, Tainan City.
- 24–28 August – The Harvard Project for Asian and International Relations Asia Conference in Taipei.

=== September ===
- 1 September – The establishment of Institute of Diplomacy and International Affairs of the Ministry of Foreign Affairs.
- 10 September – The establishment of Taoyuan American School in Luzhu Township, Taoyuan County.
- 28 September – The opening of Beihu Station in Hukou Township, Hsinchu County.

=== November ===
- 21 November – The establishment of China Affairs Committee of the Democratic Progressive Party.
- 28 November – The closing of Baoshan Station of Taiwan Railways Administration in Taoyuan City, Taoyuan County.

=== December ===
- 19 December – The establishment of Labor Union of National Taiwan University.
- 24 December – The opening of Taiwan Stock Museum in Songshan District, Taipei.
- 28 December – The discontinuation of Linkou Line of Taiwan Railways Administration.

== Deaths ==
- 3 January – Fong Fei-fei, 58, Taiwanese singer, lung cancer.
- 25 February – Chen Chih-fan, 86, Taiwanese essayist and engineer.
- 1 April – Chang Mei-yao, 71, Taiwanese actress.
- 15 June – Ming Ji, 89, Taiwanese film director, organ failure.
- 20 June – Liao Fu-pen, 74, Taiwanese politician, MLY (1984–2002), multiple organ failure.
- 14 July – Wen Hsing-tsun, 86, Taiwanese politician, MLY (1987–1990), pancreatic cancer.
- 20 July – Tony Fish, 30, Taiwanese actor.
- 22 August – Paul Shan Kuo-hsi, 87, Taiwanese Roman Catholic cardinal.
- 23 August – Paul Ch'eng Shih-kuang, 96, Taiwanese Roman Catholic bishop.
- 13 September – Tao Da-wei, 69, Taiwanese entertainer, lung cancer and multiple organ failure.
- 7 December – Chen Wen-yu, 88, Taiwanese horticulturalist.
- 26 December
  - Chu Ting-shun, 84, Taiwanese musician.
  - Yen Yuan-shu, 79, Taiwanese essayist and literary critic.
- 31 December – Yang Teng-kuei, 74, Taiwanese film producer, stroke.
