= 2004 in Taiwan =

- Decades: 1980s; 1990s; 2000s; 2010s; 2020s
- See also: Other events of 2004; History of Taiwan • Timeline • Years

Events from the year 2004 in Taiwan. This year is numbered Minguo 93 according to the official Republic of China calendar.

== Incumbents ==
- President – Chen Shui-bian
- Vice President – Annette Lu
- Premier – Yu Shyi-kun
- Vice Premier – Lin Hsin-i, Yeh Chu-lan

== Events ==
=== February ===
- 1 February – The upgrade of Van Nung Institute of Technology in Zhongli City, Taoyuan County to Vanung University.
- 28 February – 228 Hand-in-Hand Rally.

=== March ===
- 9 March – The opening of Chiayi Municipal Museum in East District, Chiayi City.
- 10 March – The establishment of National Airborne Service Corps of the Ministry of the Interior.
- 19 March – 3-19 shooting incident, an assassination attempt on Chen Shui-bian and Annette Lu in Tainan City.
- 20 March
  - 2004 Republic of China presidential election took place and Chen Shui-bian won the election, compiling 50.11% of the popular vote.
  - 2004 Republic of China referendum.
- 21 March – The opening of Changhua City Library in Changhua County.

=== April ===
- 1 April
  - The merging between West District and Central District to form the West Central District in Tainan City.
  - The opening of Chuwan Crab Museum in Xiyu Township, Penghu County.

=== May ===
- 1 May – The opening of Green World Ecological Farm in Beipu Township, Hsinchu County.
- 8 May – 15th Golden Melody Awards in Taipei City.
- 20 May – The swearing in of the second term of President Chen Shui-bian.

=== June ===
- 1 June
  - The establishment of CTV MyLife.
  - The establishment of TTV Family.

=== July ===
- 1 July
  - The establishment of Bureau of Energy.
  - The establishment of CTV News Channel.
  - The establishment of Financial Supervisory Commission.
  - The establishment of PTS2.
- 4 July – The establishment of the Formosa Party.

=== August ===
- 1 August – The establishment of Kao Fong College in Changzhi Township, Pingtung County.
- 7 August – The opening of Puppetry Art Center of Taipei in Songshan District, Taipei.
- 13 August – The founding of Runewaker Entertainment in Taichung.
- 17–27 August – Typhoon Aere.

=== September ===
- 1 September – The establishment of TTV Finance.
- 29 September – The opening of Xiaobitan Branch Line of Taipei Metro.

=== October ===
- 1–3 October – The 1st Taiwan Youth Day.

=== November ===
- 19 November – The opening of Miramar Entertainment Park in Zhongshan District, Taipei.
- 21 November – The start of 2004 FIFA Futsal World Championship.
- 21–27 November – Taiwan hosted the 2004 FIBA Asia Stanković Cup. Qatar national basketball team won the competition.

=== December ===
- 1 December – The renaming of Keelung City Cultural Center to Keelung Cultural Center.
- 11 December
  - 2004 Democratic Progressive Party presidential primary
  - 2004 Republic of China legislative election was held and Chen Shui-bian won the popular vote of the election.
- 18 December – 11,551 residents of Kaohsiung City set a world record: longest time to play two songs without stopping.
- 28 December – The opening of YM Oceanic Culture and Art Museum in Ren'ai District, Keelung.

== Deaths ==
- 3 March – Wei Yung, 67, Minister of Research, Development and Evaluation Commission (1976-1988).
- 6 April – Yuan Che-sheng, suicide by hanging.
- 14 August – Hsu Tzi-ting, 23, Taiwanese model, suicide by jumping.
- 15 December – Chiang Fang-liang, 88, First Lady (1978–1988), lung cancer.
