= 2005 in Taiwan =

- Decades: 1980s; 1990s; 2000s; 2010s; 2020s
- See also: Other events of 2005; History of Taiwan • Timeline • Years

Events from the year 2005 in Taiwan. This year is numbered Minguo 94 according to the official Republic of China calendar.

== Incumbents ==
- President – Chen Shui-bian
- Vice President – Annette Lu
- Premier – Yu Shyi-kun, Frank Hsieh
- Vice Premier – Yeh Chu-lan, Wu Rong-i

== Events ==
=== January ===
- 1 January – The founding of Taipei Fubon Bank with the merger of Fubon Bank and TaipeiBank.
- 22 January – The official opening of Bangka Park in Wanhua District, Taipei.
- 27 January – The opening of Jingtong Mining Industry Museum in Pingxi District, New Taipei.

=== March ===
- 14 March – Mainland China passed the Anti-Secession Law, a bill to prevent Taiwan from being an independent nation.

=== April ===
- 1 April – The renaming of National Space Program Office to National Space Organization.
- 29 April – The opening of Baguashan Tunnel.

=== May ===
County-level units won by the Democratic Progressive Party (green) and the Kuomintang (blue).

- 14 May – 2005 Republic of China National Assembly election. Annette Lu of the Democratic Progressive Party won the election.
- 17 May – The relocation of Pingtung Airport to the southern field upon the completion of the new airport building.

=== July ===
- 1 July – The establishment of Taiwan Indigenous Television, Asia's first aboriginal television channel.
- 16 July – 2005 Kuomintang chairmanship election took place. Ma Ying-jeou won the election, casting a total votes cast of 370,054 and a percentage of vote of 72.4%.
- 18 July – Typhoon Haiting hit Taiwan. The typhoon has winds up to 114 mph.
- 22 July – The establishment of TTV World.

=== August ===
- 2 August – President Chen Shui-bian proposed Four-Stage Theory of the Republic of China.
- 4 August – The opening of Taipei County Hakka Museum in Sanxia Township, Taipei County.
- 31 August
  - Typhoon Talim hit Taiwan. It caused about $1.5 billion in damage.
  - The establishment of Taipower Exhibit Center in Southern Taiwan in Hengchun, Pingtung County.

=== September ===
- 3–6 September – The 10th Computer Olympiad took place in Taipei. It was a competition where computer programs competed each other in a variety of games.

=== October ===
- 1 October – The opening of Wulai Atayal Museum in Wulai Township, Taipei County.
- 27 October – The opening of Linkou Line of Taiwan Railways Administration.

=== November ===
- 26 November – The establishment of Siraya National Scenic Area.
- 28 November – The opening of Baoshan Station of Taiwan Railways Administration in Taoyuan City, Taoyuan County.

=== December ===
- 3 December – 2005 Republic of China local election.

== Deaths ==
- 3 January – Koo Chen-fu, 87, Chairman of Straits Exchange Foundation (1990-2005).
- 6 April – Hsu Hai-ching, 92, Taiwanese gangster
- 15 June – Henry Kao, 91, Minister of Transportation and Communications (1972-1976).
- 1 November – Ma Ho-ling, 84, father of President Ma Ying-jeou.

== See also ==
- Timeline of the 2005 Pacific typhoon season
