= 2008 in Taiwan =

- Decades: 1980s; 1990s; 2000s; 2010s; 2020s
- See also: Other events of 2008; History of Taiwan • Timeline • Years

The following events occurred in Taiwan in the year 2008. This year is numbered Minguo 97 according to the official Republic of China calendar.

== Incumbents ==
- President – Chen Shui-bian, Ma Ying-jeou
- Vice President – Annette Lu, Vincent Siew
- Premier – Chang Chun-hsiung, Liu Chao-shiuan
- Vice Premier – Chiou I-jen, Chang Chun-hsiung, Paul Chiu

== Events ==
=== January ===
- 12 January – 2008 Republic of China transitional justice referendums.
- 16 January – The promulgation of Partial Article Revision on Petroleum Administration Act.

=== February ===
- 1 February – The renaming of National College of Physical Education and Sports to National Taiwan Sport University.

=== March ===
- 9 March – The launching of the first line (Red Line) of Kaohsiung Mass Rapid Transit in Kaohsiung.
- 22 March – Ma Ying-jeou is elected President of the Republic of China with more than 58% of the votes in the 2008 presidential election, handing the presidency back to the Kuomintang (KMT) after eight years under the Democratic Progressive Party.
- 22 March – 2008 Taiwanese United Nations membership referendum.

=== May ===
- 18 May – 2008 Democratic Progressive Party chairmanship election.

=== June ===
- 23–27 June – Computer-simulated war gaming of Han Kuang Exercise.

=== July ===
- 1 July – The opening of Taipei Medical University Shuang-Ho Hospital in Zhonghe Township, Taipei County.
- 4 July – The first direct China-Taiwan flights begin in nearly 6 decades.
- 26 July – The closing of Chinese Culture and Movie Center in Taipei.

=== August ===
- 18 August – The opening of Museum of Jade Art in Zhongshan District, Taipei.

=== September ===
- 14 September – The launching of the second line of Kaohsiung Mass Rapid Transit in Kaohsiung City.
- 22–26 September – Field training exercises of Han Kuang Exercise.

=== October ===
- 7 October – The opening of Evergreen Maritime Museum in Zhongzheng District, Taipei.
- 9–12 October – The 3rd Taiwan Youth Day.
- 25 October – The 1025 rally to safeguard Taiwan is held in Taipei by the opposition Democratic Progressive Party to voice dissatisfaction with Taiwan's increasingly closer ties with Beijing.

=== November ===
- 3–7 November – Second Chen-Chiang summit, the first visit of Association for Relations Across the Taiwan Straits head to Taiwan.
- 22–23 November – Lien Chen meets PRC President Hu Jintao at the APEC Peru 2008 in Peru, the highest level of official exchange between the Mainland and Taiwan on the international stage.
- 24 November – The establishment of Fangyuan Museum of Arts in Jiangjun Township, Tainan County.

=== December ===
- 15 December – Full restoration of Three Links with Mainland China.

== Deaths ==
- 14 January – Wu Jin, 74, Taiwanese Minister for Education (1996–1998), cancer.
- 29 April – Bo Yang, 88, Taiwanese writer.
- 10 May – Liao Feng-teh, 57, Taiwanese incoming interior minister, heart attack.
- 14 June – Chu Fu-Sung, 93, Taiwanese foreign minister (1979–1987).
- 4 July – Wayne Pai, 55, Taiwanese businessman, founding chairman of Polaris Group, suicide.
- 12 July – Tsai Chao-yang, 67, Taiwanese politician, minister of Transportation and Communications, pneumonia.
- 9 August – Vivian Shun-wen Wu, 95, Taiwanese entrepreneur, chairwoman of Yulon Motor, heart failure.
- 20 August – Chao Yao-dong, 92, Taiwanese minister of economic affairs, multiple organ dysfunction syndrome.
- 15 October – Wang Yung-ching, 91, Taiwanese entrepreneur and billionaire, founder of Formosa Plastics.
- 28 October – Kung Te-cheng, 88, Chinese-born Taiwanese 77th generation descendant of Confucius, heart and respiratory failure.
- 11 December – Yeh Shih-tao, 83, Taiwanese writer, colorectal cancer.
