= 2003 in Taiwan =

- Decades: 1980s; 1990s; 2000s; 2010s; 2020s
- See also: Other events of 2003; History of Taiwan • Timeline • Years

Events from the year 2003 in Taiwan. This year is numbered Minguo 92 according to the official Republic of China calendar.

== Incumbents ==
- President – Chen Shui-bian
- Vice President – Annette Lu
- Premier – Yu Shyi-kun
- Vice Premier – Lin Hsin-i

== Events ==
=== January ===
- 14 January – The establishment of InnoLux Corporation.

=== February ===
- 14 February – The opening of Tamsui Lover's Bridge in Tamsui Township, Taipei County.

=== March ===
- 10 March – The opening of European Economic and Trade Office in Taipei.

=== May ===
- 2 May – Apple Daily, Taiwan's tabloid-style newspaper, was first published.

=== June ===
- 12–24 June – Typhoon Soudelor hit Taiwan. The storm caused about $2.46 million in damage.
- 17 June – The establishment of Taiwan Foundation for Democracy.

=== July ===
- 1 July – The establishment of Hakka TV.
- 28 July – The groundbreaking ceremony of Central Taiwan Science Park.

=== September ===
- 17 September – The establishment of Taiwan Accreditation Foundation.

=== October ===
- 17 October – The opening of National Museum of Taiwan Literature in West Central District, Tainan.
- 27 October – The establishment of Cathay United Bank after the merging of United World Chinese Commercial Bank and Cathay Commercial Bank.

=== November ===
- 1 November – The first Taiwan Pride was held.

=== December ===
- 11 December – 2004 Democratic Progressive Party presidential primary.

== See also ==
- List of Chinese films of 2003
- List of Taiwanese dramas from 2000 to 2010
- 2003 timeline in Taiwan Futures Exchange
- TVBS is renamed in 2003

== Events with dates not present in the "Events" section ==
- In 2003, Taiwan proposed a bill to legalize same-sex marriage.
- The Rose (TV series) was released in 2003.
- Education in Taiwan's National education budget was NT$ 608.6 billion in 2003.
