= 2009 in Taiwan =

- Decades: 1980s; 1990s; 2000s; 2010s; 2020s
- See also: Other events of 2009; History of Taiwan • Timeline • Years

Events from the year 2009 in Taiwan. This year is numbered Minguo 98 according to the official Republic of China calendar.

== Incumbents ==
- President – Ma Ying-jeou
- Vice President – Vincent Siew
- Premier – Liu Chao-shiuan, Wu Den-yih
- Vice Premier – Paul Chiu, Eric Chu

== Events ==
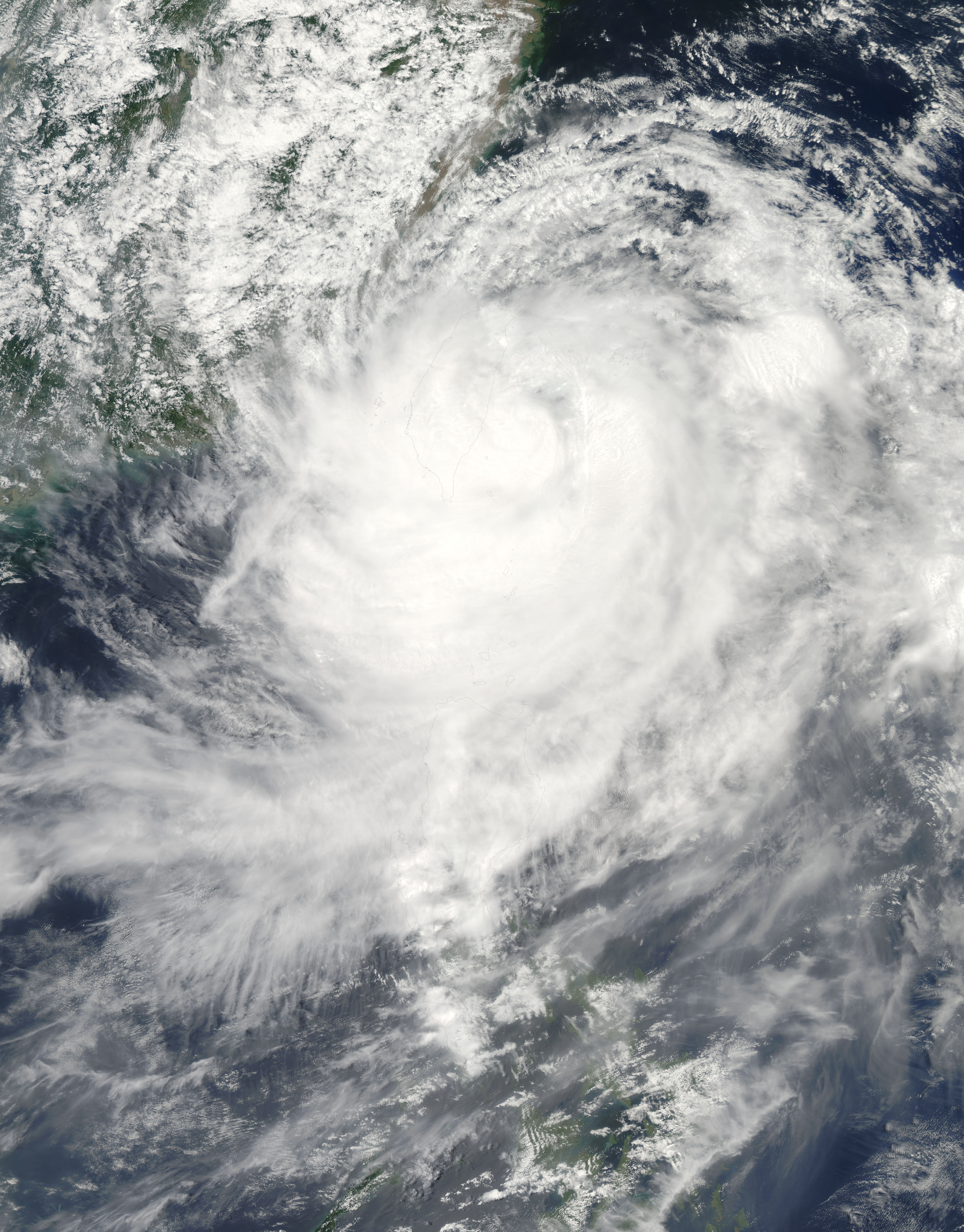
Typhoon Morakot near peak intensity

=== January ===
- 1 January – The official adaptation of Hanyu Pinyin in Taiwan.
- 18 January, the government, in more than 14,000 offices in all administrative regions of the country, to every citizen issued a total of 3,600 yuan worth of consumer vouchers per person.(s:振興經濟消費券)

=== March ===
- 31 March – The establishment of the Communist Party of the Republic of China.

=== May ===
- 23–24 May – 2009 Asian Judo Championships in Taipei Arena, Taipei.

=== July ===
- 4 July – The opening of Neihu Line of Taipei Metro.
- 16 July – The inauguration of Taichung LNG Terminal in Wuqi District, Taichung.
- 16–26 July – World Games 2009 in Kaohsiung City.
- 20 July – The name restoration for Chiang Kai-shek Memorial Hall in Taipei.
- 26 July – 2009 Kuomintang chairmanship election.
- 27 July – The opening of Qishan Train Station in Kaohsiung County.

=== August ===
- 7 August – Typhoon Morakot hits Taiwan, killing 500 and stranding more than 1,000 via the worst flooding on the island in half a century.
- 19 August – The opening of Taipei Bus Station in Taipei.
- 19–22 August – The 4th Taiwan Youth Day.

=== September ===
- 5–15 September – 2009 Summer Deaflympics in Taipei.
- 11 September – The former Taiwanese President Chen Shui-bian received a life sentence and was fined NT$200 million (US$6.13 million) on charges of embezzlement, taking bribes, and money laundering, involving a total of US$15 million (NT$490 million) while in office from 2000 to 2008. Supporters of Chen contended that the prosecution was politically motivated. Chen is the first ROC president to receive a prison sentence.
- 27 September – The opening of Kaohsiung Arena in Kaohsiung.

=== November ===
- 22 November – The opening of Black Bat Squadron Memorial Hall in East District, Hsinchu City.
- 28 November – The establishment of CTi Entertainment.

=== December ===
- 11 December – The opening of Qsquare in Datong District, Taipei.
- 19 December – The 6.4 M_{w} Hualien earthquake shook the coast of Hualien County with a maximum Mercalli intensity of VI (Strong), causing some damage and 14 injuries.
- 20 December – Fourth Chen-Chiang summit in Taichung.

== Deaths ==
- 4 January – Hsieh Yue-hsia, 65, actress.
- 3 February
  - Henry Hsu, 96, Chinese-born Taiwanese athlete and politician, MLY (1973–1987), heart failure.
  - Sheng-yen, 79, Chinese-born Taiwanese Buddhist Zen master, kidney disease.
- 7 March – Chan Yun, 93, Taiwanese Buddhist monk and teacher of meditation.
- 6 April – A-Sun, 34, Taiwanese singer and songwriter, breast cancer.
- 26 August – Lin Hui-kuan, 51, Taiwanese trade unionist and politician, MLY (2002–2008), sepsis.
- 12 September – Danny Pang, 42, Taiwanese-born American hedge fund manager.
