= 2007 in Taiwan =

- Decades: 1980s; 1990s; 2000s; 2010s; 2020s
- See also: Other events of 2007: History of Taiwan; Timeline; Years

Events from the year 2007 in Taiwan. This year is numbered Minguo 96 according to the official Republic of China calendar.

== Incumbents ==
- President – Chen Shui-bian
- Vice President – Annette Lu
- Premier – Su Tseng-chang, Chang Chun-hsiung
- Vice Premier – Tsai Ing-wen, Chiou I-jen

== Events ==
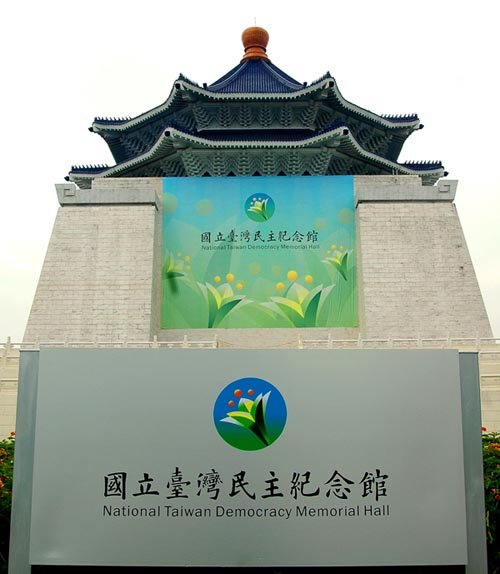
Renaming of Chiang Kai-shek Memorial Hall: Side view shortly after the renaming ceremony in May 2007.

=== January ===
- 2 January – The establishment of National Immigration Agency of Ministry of the Interior.

=== February ===
- 12 February – Four state-owned enterprises of the Republic of China (Taiwan)—Chunghwa Post, the Chinese Petroleum Corporation, the China Shipbuilding Corporation, and the Central Bank of China—change their names to remove "China" from their titles at the request of President Chen Shui-bian. The decision is condemned by the Pan-Blue Coalition, the United States and People's Republic of China as a move towards Taiwan independence.

=== March ===
- 4 March – Four Wants and One Without policy unveiled by President Chen Shui-bian.
- 27 March – Taiwan unveils an upgraded version of their Ching-kuo fighter aircraft called the Hsung Ying made by the Aerospace Industrial Development Corporation.

=== April ===
- 7 April – 2007 Kuomintang chairmanship election.
- 19 April – 2008 Democratic Progressive Party presidential primary.

=== May ===
- 12 May
  - Su Tseng-chang resigns as the Premier of the Republic of China (Taiwan) following a loss in a primary election to be the Democratic Progressive Party candidate in the 2008 Taiwanese presidential election.
  - 2007 Keelung City local election
  - The opening of Dream Mall in Kaohsiung.
- 14 May – The President of the Republic of China Chen Shui-bian names Chang Chun-hsiung of the Democratic Progressive Party as the new Premier of the Republic of China.
- 15 May – Renaming of Chiang Kai-shek Memorial Hall: President Chen Shui-bian announced the renaming of the Chiang Kai-shek Memorial Hall in Taipei to the "National Taiwan Democracy Memorial Hall". This move was condemned by the pan-blue media as a political move by the Democratic Progressive Party to denounce the historical heritage of the Republic of China. The site has since been restored back to the original title with the Nationalists back in power.

=== June ===
- 15 June – The establishment of Taiwan Farmers' Party.
- 16 June – The opening of Yuchang Tunnel.
- 27 June – The opening of Bo Yang Museum in Tainan.

=== July ===
- July – The Republic of China applied for UN membership to represent the people of Taiwan and its outlying islands only, under the name "Taiwan", and was rejected by the General Assembly.
- 4 July – The opening of Zhinan Temple gondola station in Wenshan District, Taipei.

=== August ===
- 3–5 August – Wikimania 2007 conference in Taipei.
- 8 August – Yilan County Government announced the Yilan International Children's Folklore and Folkgame Festival to be ceased.
- 22–27 August – The 2nd Taiwan Youth Day.

=== September ===
- 6 September – An earthquake measuring 6.5 M_{w} strikes off shore of Taiwan near the capital city Taipei.
- 27 September – The opening of Yang Kui Literature Memorial Museum in Xinhua District, Tainan.

=== October ===
- 6 October – 2007 Pacific typhoon season: Typhoon Krosa hits Taiwan, killing at least four people and injuring 40 more.

=== November ===
- 8 November – The establishment of Taiwan Constitution Association.

=== December ===
- 6 December – The establishment of Taiwan Financial Holdings Group.
- 12 December – The completion of Taiping Island Airport construction in Cijin District, Kaohsiung.
- 28 December – The opening of YM Museum of Marine Exploration Kaohsiung in Cijin District, Kaohsiung.

== Births ==
- 30 May – Angel Ho, actress.

== Deaths ==
- 5 January – Momofuku Ando, 96, Taiwanese-born inventor of Nissin instant ramen noodles including the Cup Noodle.
- 28 January – Beatrice Hsu, 28, Taiwanese actress, cardiac arrest following car accident.
- 11 February – Huang Hai-tai, 107, Taiwanese puppeteer.
- 19 February – Hsu Tsai-li, 59, Taiwanese politician, Mayor of Keelung (since 2001).
- 29 June – Edward Yang, 59, Taiwanese film director (Yi Yi), colon cancer.
- 12 July – James Shen, 98, Taiwanese diplomat, Republic of China ambassador to the United States (1971–1978).
- 4 October – Chen Chi-li, 64, Chinese-born Taiwanese gangster, killer of dissident journalist Henry Liu, pancreatic cancer.
