= 2006 in Taiwan =

- Decades: 1980s; 1990s; 2000s; 2010s; 2020s
- See also: Other events of 2006; History of Taiwan • Timeline • Years

Events from the year 2006 in Taiwan. This year is numbered Minguo 95 according to the official Republic of China calendar.

== Incumbents ==
- President – Chen Shui-bian
- Vice President – Annette Lu
- Premier – Frank Hsieh, Su Tseng-chang
- Vice Premier – Wu Rong-i, Tsai Ing-wen

== Events ==
=== January ===
- 15 January – 2006 Democratic Progressive Party chairmanship election.
- 25 January
  - Su Tseng-chang became the Premier of the Republic of China.
  - Tsai Ing-wen became the Vice Premier of the Republic of China.

=== February ===
- 22 February – The establishment of National Communications Commission.
- 27 February – President Chen Shui-bian announced that National Unification Council ceased to function.

=== May ===
- 31 May – The opening of Bannan Line of Taipei Metro.

=== June ===
- 9–21 June – 2006 Enterprise Football League.
- 10 June – 17th Golden Melody Awards in Taipei.
- 16 June – The opening of Hsuehshan Tunnel.
- 23 June – The opening of Poképark.

=== July ===
- 1 July – The establishment of B'in Music.

=== August ===
- 5 August – The opening of Chiang Wei-shui Memorial Park in Datong District, Taipei.
- 6 August – ROC cut diplomatic relations with Chad.

=== September ===
- 1 September – Fu Hsing Kang College became part of National Defense University.
- 6 September – The renaming of Chiang Kai-shek International Airport to Taiwan Taoyuan International Airport.

=== October ===
- 14 October – The establishment of Hakka Party.
- 24 October
  - The launching of Sharp Daily in Taipei.
  - The opening of THSR Taichung Station in Wuri Township, Taichung County.
- 27–29 October – 2006 Taipei International Invitational Futsal Tournament in Taipei.
- 28 October – The establishment of Ling Tung Numismatic Museum in Taichung.

=== November ===
- 3 November
  - The opening of Chiayi HSR station in Taibao City, Chiayi County.
  - The opening of Tainan HSR station in Gueiren Township, Tainan County.
- 7 November – The opening of Hsinchu HSR station in Zhubei City, Hsinchu County.
- 9 November – The opening of Taichung Intercontinental Baseball Stadium in Beitun District, Taichung.
- 10 November – The opening of Taoyuan HSR station in Zhongli City, Taoyuan County.

=== December ===
- 9 December – 2006 Republic of China municipal election.
- 26 December - The M_{w} 7.0 and 6.9 Hengchun earthquakes occurred in Pingtung County. Separated by eight minutes, this doublet earthquake resulted in several deaths and injuries.

== Deaths ==
- 3 June – Ni Wen-ya, 103, Taiwanese politician, MLY (1948–1988), PLY (1972–1988).
- 10 September – Chang Chuan-tien, 61, Taiwanese politician, MLY (1999–2006), liver failure.
- 5 November – Chen Ding-nan, 63, Taiwanese politician, MLY (1990–2000), Minister of Justice (2000–2005), lung cancer.
