= Ling Tung University =

University in Taichung, Taiwan

Coordinates: 24°08′16″N 120°36′31″E

- 嶺東科技大學
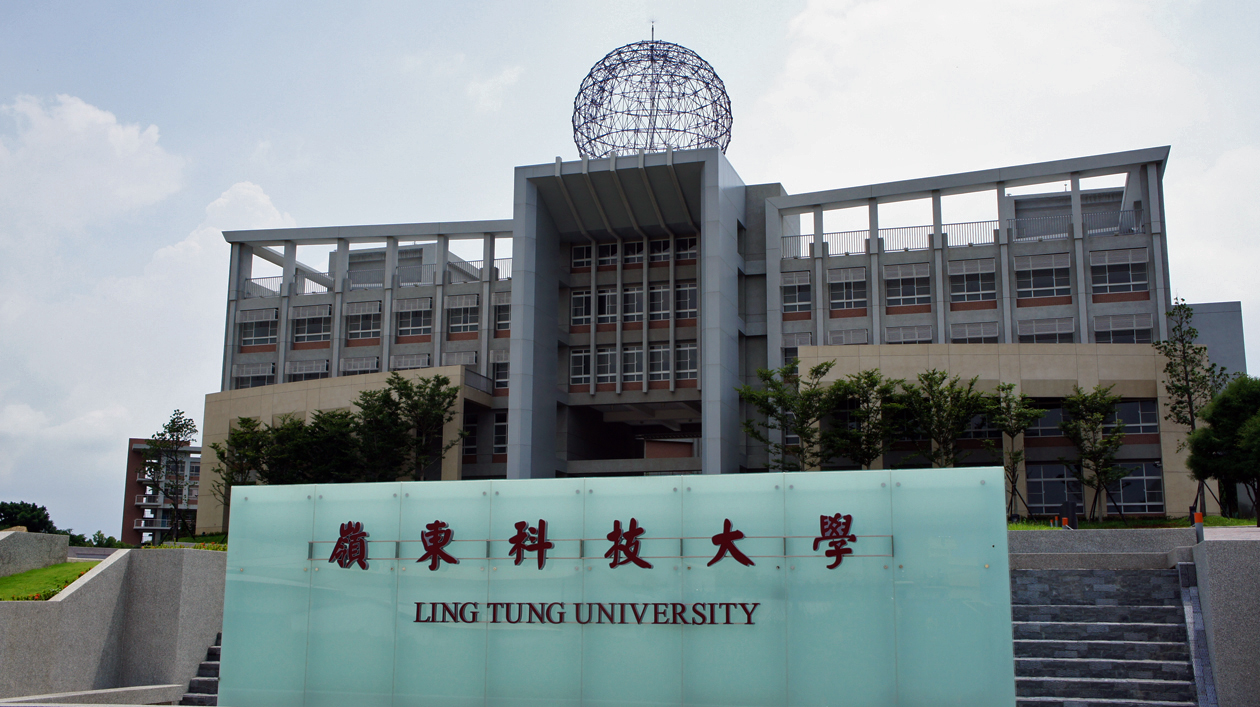
- Motto: 學以致用，誠以待人 (Pe̍h-ōe-jī: Ha̍k Í Tì-iōng, sêng í thāi-jîn) (Learn to use, Sincere to others)
- Type: Private
- Established: 1964 (as Ling Tung Junior College of Accounting); 2005 (as LTU)
- President: Dr. Zhiyang Zhao
- Faculty: 500
- Undergraduates: 11,000
- Postgraduates: 227
- Location: Nantun, Taichung, Taiwan
- Campus: Tsuen-an, Pao-wen,
- Mascot: Lucky Goat
- Website: ltu.edu.tw

Ling Tung University
- Traditional Chinese: 嶺東科技大學
Transcriptions
Standard Mandarin
- Hanyu Pinyin: Lǐngdōng kējìdàxué
Southern Min
- Hokkien POJ: Léng-tang Kho-ki Tāi-ha̍k

Ling Tung University (LTU; Chinese: 嶺東科技大學; Pe̍h-ōe-jī: Léng-tang Kho-ki Tāi-ha̍k) is a private university in Nantun District, Taichung, Taiwan.

The university is recognized by the Ministry of Education in Taiwan and accredited by the Accreditation Council for Business Schools and Programs (ACBSP).

The university has four colleges: the College of Engineering, the College of Management, the College of Humanities and Social Sciences, and the College of Health Sciences.

The university offers undergraduate and graduate programs in various fields, including engineering, management, humanities, social sciences, and health sciences.

== History ==
The university was originally founded in 1964 as Ling Tung Junior College of Accounting. In 2005, it was updated into Ling Tung University.

== Faculties ==
- College of Business and Management
- College of Design
- College of Fashion
- College of Information Science

== Campuses ==
The university consists of Baowen Campus and Chun'an Campus.

== Museum ==
The university houses the Ling Tung Numismatic Museum.

== See also ==
- List of universities in Taiwan
