= Taiwan Confederation of Trade Unions =

TCTU
- Taiwan Confederation of Trade Unions
- Founded: 1997
- Headquarters: Taipei, Taiwan
- Location: Taiwan (Republic of China)
- Members: 280,000 (2000)
- Key people: Lu Tien-Lin, president
- Website: www.tctu.org.tw

The Taiwan Confederation of Trade Unions (TCTU; Chinese: 全國產業總工會) is a national trade union center in Taiwan. It was established in 1997, but did not receive official recognition from the government until May 1, 2000.

The organization has been described as politically aligned with the Democratic Progressive party. It has been positioned as an alternative to the Chinese Federation of Labor, which has historical ties to Kuomintang (KMT).

== Affiliates ==
The TCTU has 21 affiliated unions.

- Kaohsiung County Federation of Trade Unions
- Kaohsiung City Confederation of Trade Unions
- Tainan Hsien (County) Federation of Trade Unions
- YiLan County Confederation of Trade Unions
- Miaoli County Confederation of Trade Unions
- Hsinchu Confederation of Trade Unions (County level)
- Confederation of Taipei Trade Unions
- Taichung City Amalgamated Industrial Union
- Chang Hwa Confederation of Trade Unions
- Ta-ton Corporation Union
- Taiwan Power Labor Union
- Taiwan Petroleum Workers’ Union
- Taiwan Tobacco & Liquor Corporation Federation Union
- Chungwha Telecommunication Workers' Union
- China Airlines Employee Union
