= 2011 in Taiwan =

- Decades: 1990s; 2000s; 2010s; 2020s
- See also: Other events of 2011; History of Taiwan • Timeline • Years

Events from the year 2011 in Taiwan. This year is numbered Minguo 100 according to the official Republic of China calendar.

== Incumbents ==
- President – Ma Ying-jeou
- Vice President – Vincent Siew
- Premier – Wu Den-yih
- Vice Premier – Sean Chen

== Events ==
=== January ===
- 1 January
  - The government introduces a monthly stipend of NT$3,000 for each child under the age of 2 in low and medium income families.
  - The national minimum wage is raised to NT$17,880 per month (from NT$17,280) and the minimum hourly wage is also raised, from NT$95 to NT$98.
  - The Shalun Line opens, connecting downtown Tainan with Tainan High-Speed Rail Station.
- 2 January – The opening of Chang Jung Christian University Station of Taiwan Railways Administration in Gueiren District, Tainan.
- 7 January – Yen Ming is appointed Commanding General of the ROC Air Force after his predecessor Lei Yu-chi was demoted for misuse of public resources.
- 9 January – The groundbreaking ceremony of Kinmen Bridge by President Ma Ying-jeou in Kinmen.
- 11 January – Holders of Republic of China (Taiwan) passports are eligible for visa free entry to the Schengen Area of the European Union, plus three other EU countries.
- 27 January – The opening of Chang Lien-cheng Saxophone Museum in Houli District, Taichung.

=== February ===
- 8 February – Major General Lo Hsieh-che, head of the Taiwanese Army's electronic communications and information department, is arrested for allegedly leaking secrets to the People's Republic of China.
- 12 February – The 13th Pingxi Sky Lantern Festival in New Taipei City.

=== March ===
- 6 March – Nine people are killed and 12 injured in a fire in a bar in Taichung City.
- 11 March – The 2011 Tōhoku earthquake and tsunami have effects in northeastern Taiwan.
- 29 March – The opening of Itteki Memorial House in Tamsui District, New Taipei City.
- 30 March – The establishment of National Academy for Educational Research of the Ministry of Education.

=== April ===
- 5 April – The opening of Drop of Water Memorial Hall in Tamsui District, New Taipei City.
- 11–15 April – Han Kuang Exercise in Taichung City and Pingtung County.
- 24 April – The opening of Jhongdou Wetlands Park in Sanmin District, Kaohsiung City.

=== May ===
- Plasticizer in food products (sports drinks, juices, teas, syrups and jams, and tablets and powders) in a food scandal that hit Taiwan
- 7 May – The establishment of Taiwan Halal Integrity Development Association in Zhongzheng District, Taipei City.

=== June ===
- 14 June – The Legislative Yuan passes the Judges Act, introducing external evaluation of judges.
- 18 June – 22nd Golden Melody Awards in Taipei Arena, Taipei.

=== July ===
- 17 July – The opening of Tainan Cultural and Creative Park in North District, Tainan.

=== August ===
- The establishment of Chang Gung University of Science and Technology in Chiayi County.
- The establishment of Chung Chou University of Science and Technology in Changhua County.

=== October ===
- 7 October – The opening of Greater Taichung International Expo Center in Wuri District, Taichung.
- 8 October – The Democratic Progressive Party (DPP) Chairperson Tsai Ing-wen and the presidential candidate for the 2012 Taiwan presidential election explained her stance on the existence of the Republic of China on Taiwan as "Taiwan is the Republic of China, and the Republic of China is Taiwan."
- 9 October – The opening of Penbay International Circuit in Donggang Township, Pingtung County.
- 10 October – 100th Anniversary of the Republic of China.
- 19 October – The establishment of Mozilla Taiwan.
- 29 October – The establishment of National Museum of Taiwan History in Annan District, Tainan.

=== November ===
- The opening of Wellspring Theater in Taipei City.
- 11 November – The opening of Liujia Station in Hsinchu County.

=== December ===
- 1 December – The establishment of National Taichung University of Science and Technology in North District, Taichung.
- 2 December – Eruption of a mud volcano in Wandan Township, Pingtung County.
- 10 December – The commissioning of Bihai Power Plant in Hualien County.
- 25 December – The opening of Fo Guang Shan Buddha Museum in Dashu District, Kaohsiung.

== Deaths ==
- 29 January – Nora Sun, 73, Chinese American diplomat and businesswoman, injuries sustained in a traffic collision.
- 10 February – Chen Houei-kuen, 105, Taiwanese painter.
- 4 July – Teng Yu-kun, 65, Taiwanese screenwriter.
- 1 September – Liu Huang A-tao, 90, Taiwanese comfort woman and activist.
- 25 October – Sansan Chien, 44, composer.
- 17 November – Ng Chiau-tong, 79, Taiwanese independence activist, complications of a heart attack.
- 23 November – Yang Jih-sung, 86, Taiwanese forensic scientist, colon cancer.
