= Chinese Federation of Labor =

National trade union center in Taiwan

- 中華民國全國總工會
- Founded: 1948
- Headquarters: Taipei
- Location: Taiwan (Republic of China)
- Members: 250,000
- Key people: Chen Chieh, president
- Affiliations: ITUC
- Website: www.cfl.org.tw

The Chinese Federation of Labor (CFL; Chinese: 中華民國全國總工會) is a national trade union center in the Republic of China. It was founded in 1948 in mainland China, and until the government recognition of the Taiwan Confederation of Trade Unions in 2000, was the sole official labor confederation in the RoC.

The CFL is closely linked with the Kuomintang (KMT), and has experienced some difficulties with the government since the KMT lost power during democratization.

The CFL is affiliated with the International Trade Union Confederation.

== See also ==
- Labor Union of National Taiwan University
- All-China Federation of Trade Unions
