= 2010 in Taiwan =

- Decades: 1990s; 2000s; 2010s; 2020s
- See also: Other events of 2010; History of Taiwan • Timeline • Years

Events from the year 2010 in Taiwan. This year is numbered Minguo 99 according to the official Republic of China calendar.

== Incumbents ==
- President – Ma Ying-jeou
- Vice President – Vincent Siew
- Premier – Wu Den-yih
- Vice Premier – Eric Chu, Sean Chen

== Events ==
A 6.4-magnitude earthquake hit the mountainous area of Kaohsiung County of the southwestern Taiwan.

=== January ===
- 7 January – The United States approves a US$6 billion arms sales package to Taiwan, amid opposition from Mainland China.
- 9 January – Opposition Democratic Progressive Party wins all three seats in by-elections against the ruling Kuomintang.

=== March ===
- 4 March – The 6.3 M_{w} Kaohsiung earthquake affected the southern part of the island with a maximum Mercalli intensity of VI (Strong), injuring 96 people.
- 14 March – 314 Taipei protest in Taipei.
- 22 March – The commissioning of Zhushan Power Plant in Nangan Township, Lienchiang County.

=== April ===
- 3 April – The opening of Penghu Living Museum in Magong City, Penghu County.

=== May ===
- 1 May
  - Taiwan employs capital punishment for the first time since 2005, executing four men for "grave offences such as fatal kidnappings and murders".
  - The opening of Kaohsiung Museum of Labor in Kaohsiung City.
- 7 May – The establishment of Cross-Strait Tourism Exchange Association in Daan District, Taipei City.
- 15 May – Year of the Rain is shown on TV.
- 28 May – Murder of Weng Chi-nan in Taichung.

=== June ===
- 1 June – The establishment of Academia Sinica Institute of Astronomy and Astrophysics.
- 26 June – Anti-ECFA protest.

=== July ===
- 3 July – The restoration of the annual Yilan International Children's Folklore and Folkgame Festival in Yilan County.
- 7 July – Protests in Hong Kong and Taiwan mark the 73rd anniversary of the Marco Polo Bridge Incident.

=== August ===
- 1 August – The upgrade of Transworld Institute of Technology in Douliu City, Yunlin County to TransWorld University.
- 19 August – The Legislative Yuan passed an amendment to the Act Governing Preferential Treatment for Retired Presidents and Vice Presidents (Chinese: 卸任總統副總統禮遇條例).

=== September ===
- 14 September – Typhoon Fanapi.

=== October ===
- 9 October – The opening of Yuanshan Bus Station in Taipei.
- 10 October – The establishment of Republic of China Presidential Museum in Zhongzheng District, Taipei.
- 16 October – The opening of Lanyang Museum in Toucheng Township, Yilan County.

=== November ===
- 3 November – The opening of Luzhou Line and Xinzhuang Line of Taipei Metro.
- 6 November – The establishment of Taipei Expo Park in Zhongshan District, Taipei City.
- 26 November – Sean Lien shooting incident in Yonghe District, Taipei County.
- 27 November – 2010 Republic of China municipal election.

=== December ===
- 2 December – Discussion of Chiang Kai-shek diary (兩蔣日記) research continues.
- 20–22 December – Sixth Chen-Chiang summit at Grand Hotel in Zhongshan District, Taipei City.
- 25 December
  - The upgrade of Taipei County to New Taipei City with all of its cities and townships becoming districts.
  - The upgrade of Taichung City from provincial city to special municipality with Taichung County.
  - The upgrade of Tainan City from provincial city to special municipality with Tainan County.
  - The merger of Kaohsiung City with Kaohsiung County to form a larger Kaohsiung City municipality.
- 31 December – The appointment of Chang Chia-juch as the Chairman of China Airlines.

== Deaths ==
- 24 February – Ang It-hong, 82, Taiwanese singer-songwriter and actor, pancreatic cancer.
- 4 July – Hwang Yau-tai, 98, Taiwanese musician and composer. multiple organ failure.
- 20 July – Lin Tsung-yi, 89, Taiwanese psychiatrist.
- 24 October – Pan Jin-yu, 96, last remaining speaker of the Pazeh language of Taiwan.
- 19 November – Lin Tsung-nan, 68, Taiwanese politician, Magistrate of Nantou County (2001–2005), adenocarcinoma of the lung.
- 2 December – Lee Huan, 93, Taiwanese politician, Premier of the Republic of China (1989–1990).
