= 2007 Democratic Progressive Party presidential primary =

- 19 April 2007
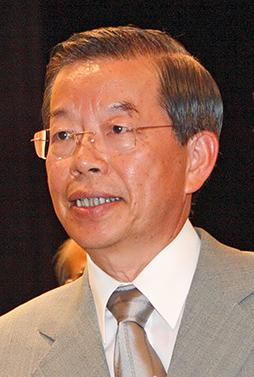

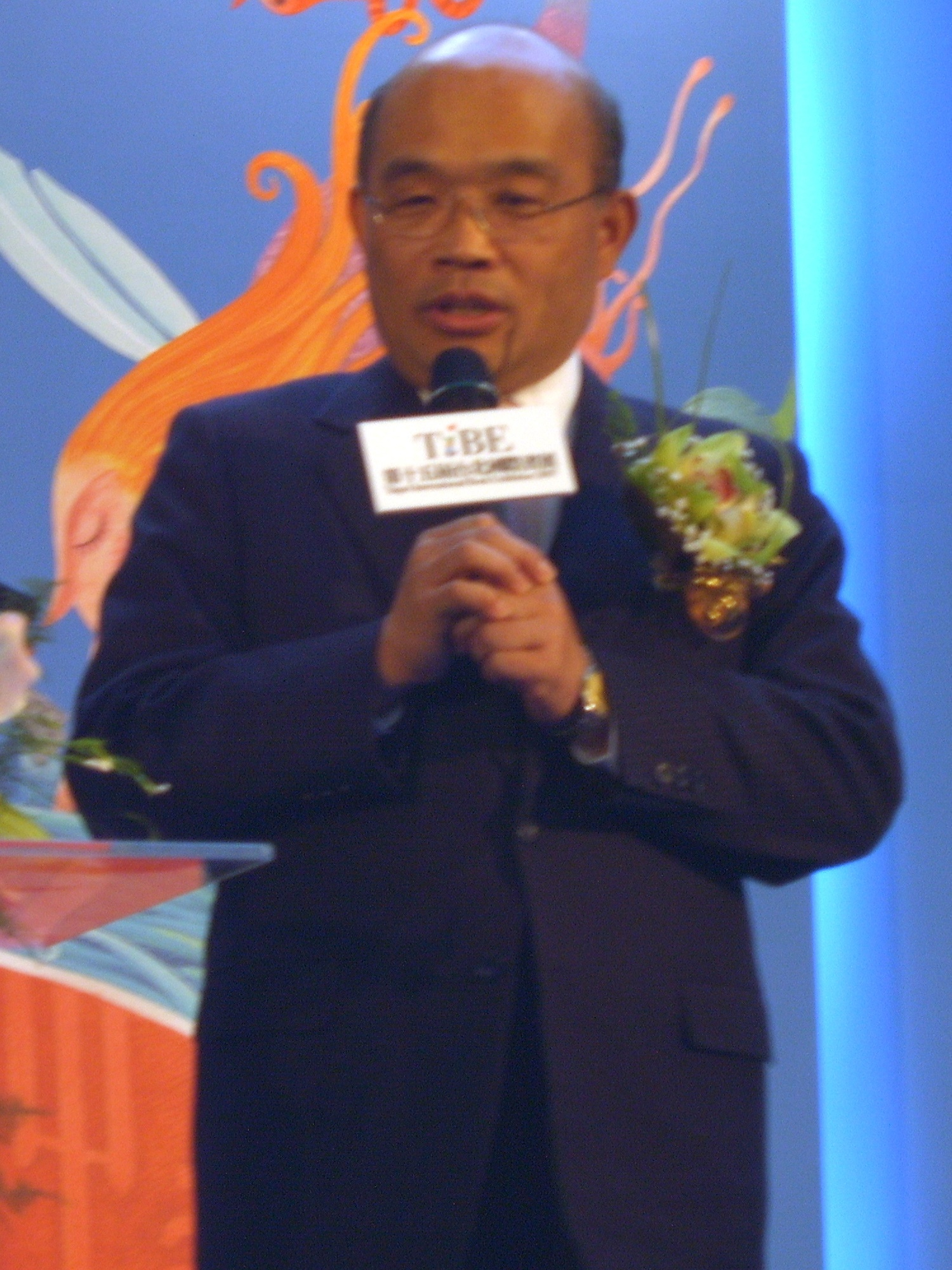

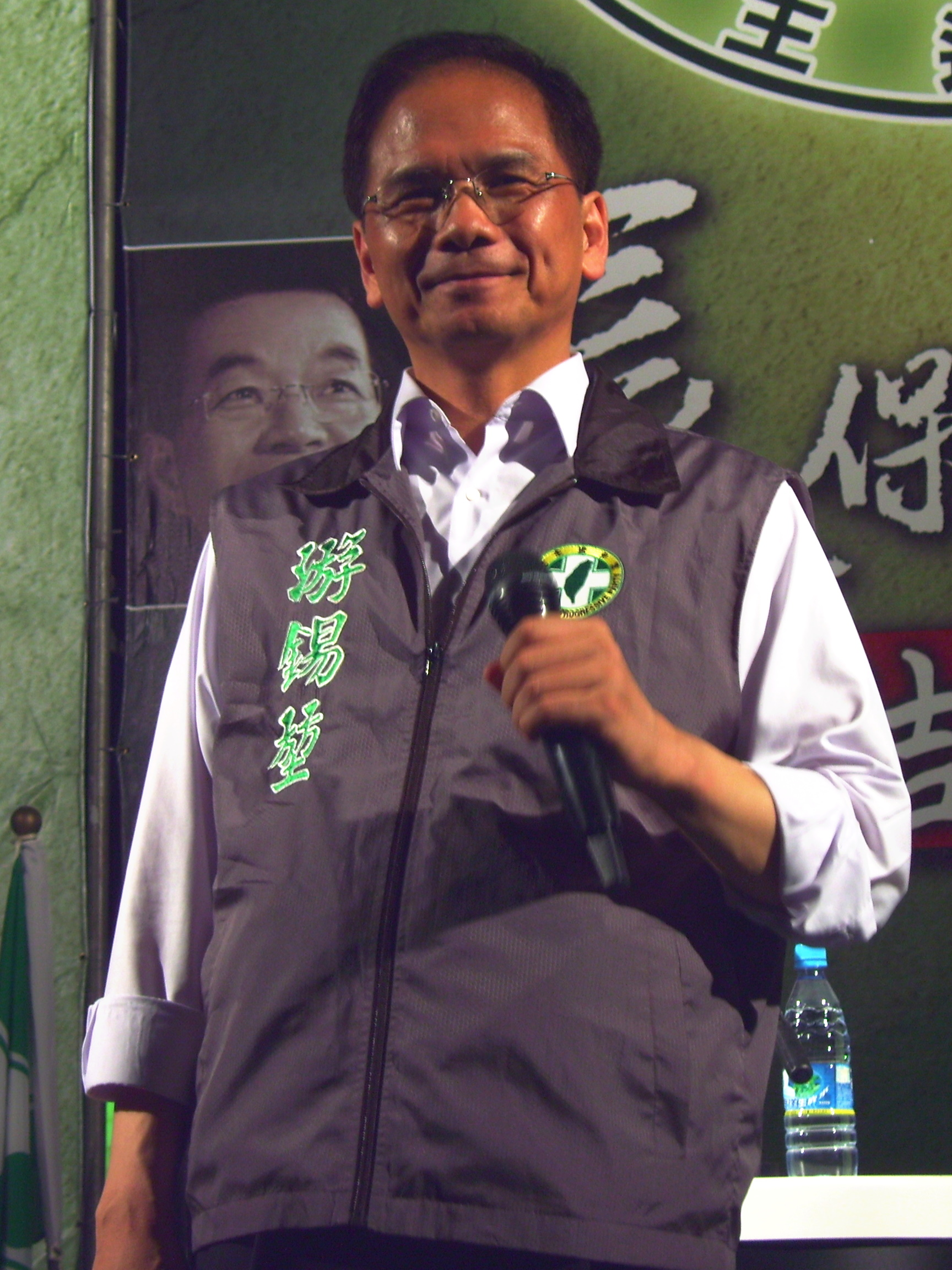

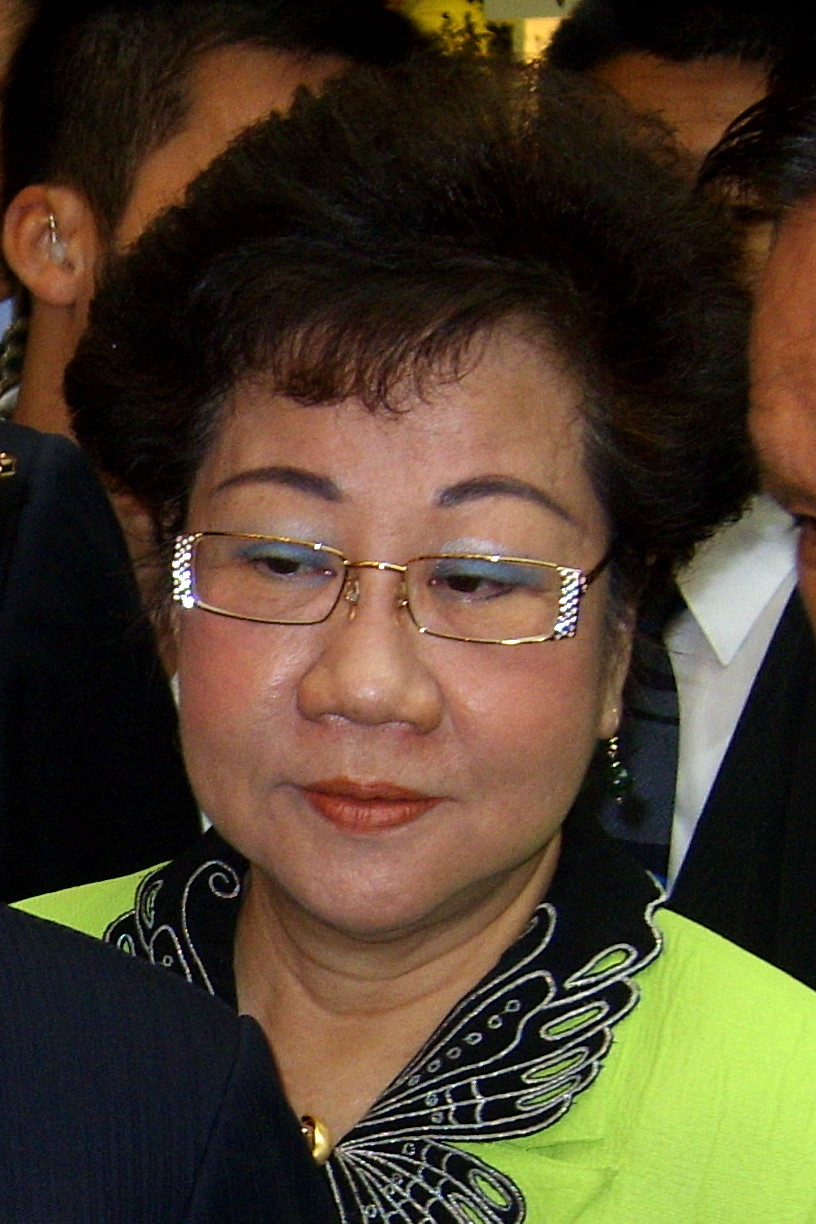
Candidate	Hsieh Chang-ting	Su Tseng-chang
Popular vote	62,851	46,997
Percentage	44.66%	33.40%
Candidate	Yu Shyi-kun	Lu Hsiu-lien
Popular vote	22,213	8,668
Percentage	15.78%	6.16%
Nominee before election
Chen Shui-bian
Elected Nominee
Hsieh Chang-ting

The 2007 Democratic Progressive Party presidential primary was the selection process by which the Democratic Progressive Party of the Republic of China (Taiwan) chose its candidate for the 2008 presidential election. The DPP candidate for president was selected through a series of member of the party in Thursday, 19 April 2007.

== Result ==
Candidate	Votes	Percentage
Hsieh	62,851	44.66
Su	46,997	33.40
Yu	22,213	15.78
Lu	8,668	6.16
