= Ling Tung Numismatic Museum =

Museum in Nantun, Taichung, Taiwan

- 嶺東科技大學嶺東錢幣博物館
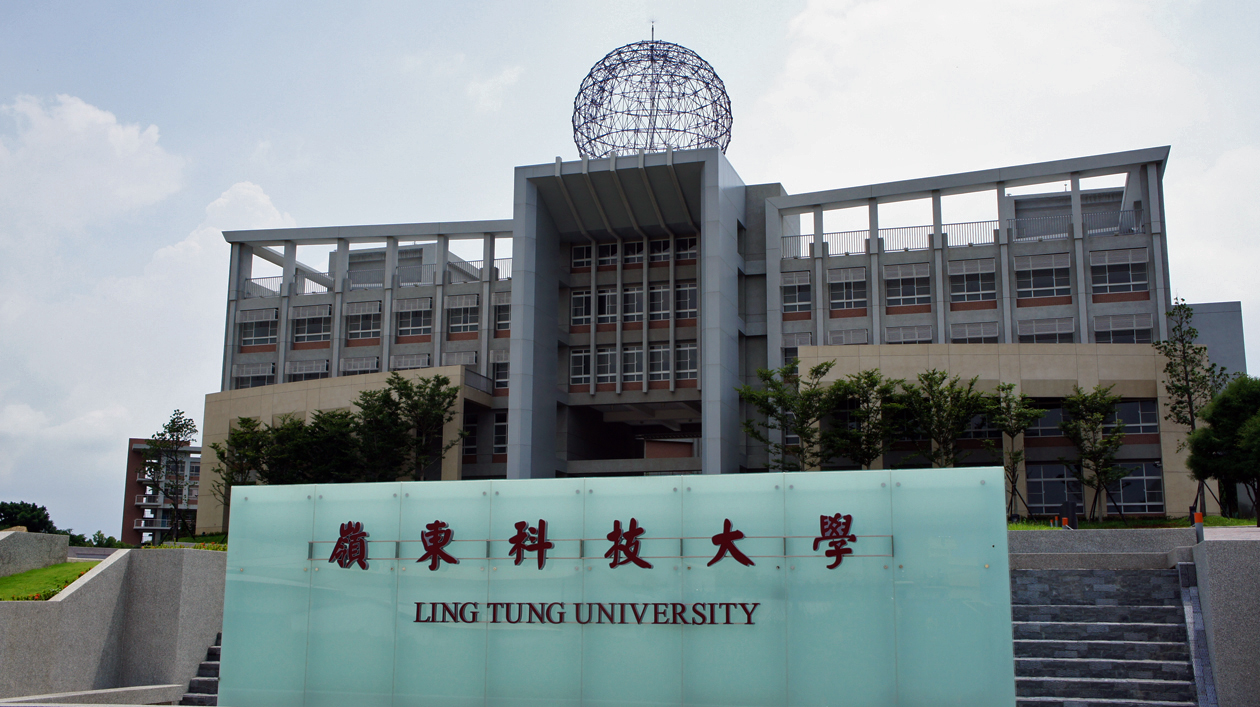
- Established: 28 October 2006
- Location: Nantun, Taichung, Taiwan
- Coordinates: 24°08′16″N 120°36′31″E
- Type: museum

The Ling Tung Numismatic Museum (traditional Chinese: 嶺東科技大學嶺東錢幣博物館; simplified Chinese: 岭东科技大学岭东钱币博物馆; pinyin: Lǐngdōng Kējì Dàxué Lǐngdōng Qiánbì Bówùguǎn) is a museum about currency in Nantun District, Taichung, Taiwan. The museum is located at Ling Tung University.

== History ==
The museum was founded on 28 October 2006 in conjunction with the 4th anniversary of the university.

== Exhibitions ==
The museum exhibits the private collections of the school's president and consists of around 4,000 pieces of ancient Chinese coins and paper money. It also displays silver ingots and bars that was in circulation during different Chinese dynasties.

== See also ==
- List of museums in Taiwan
