= Timeline of the 2005 Pacific typhoon season =

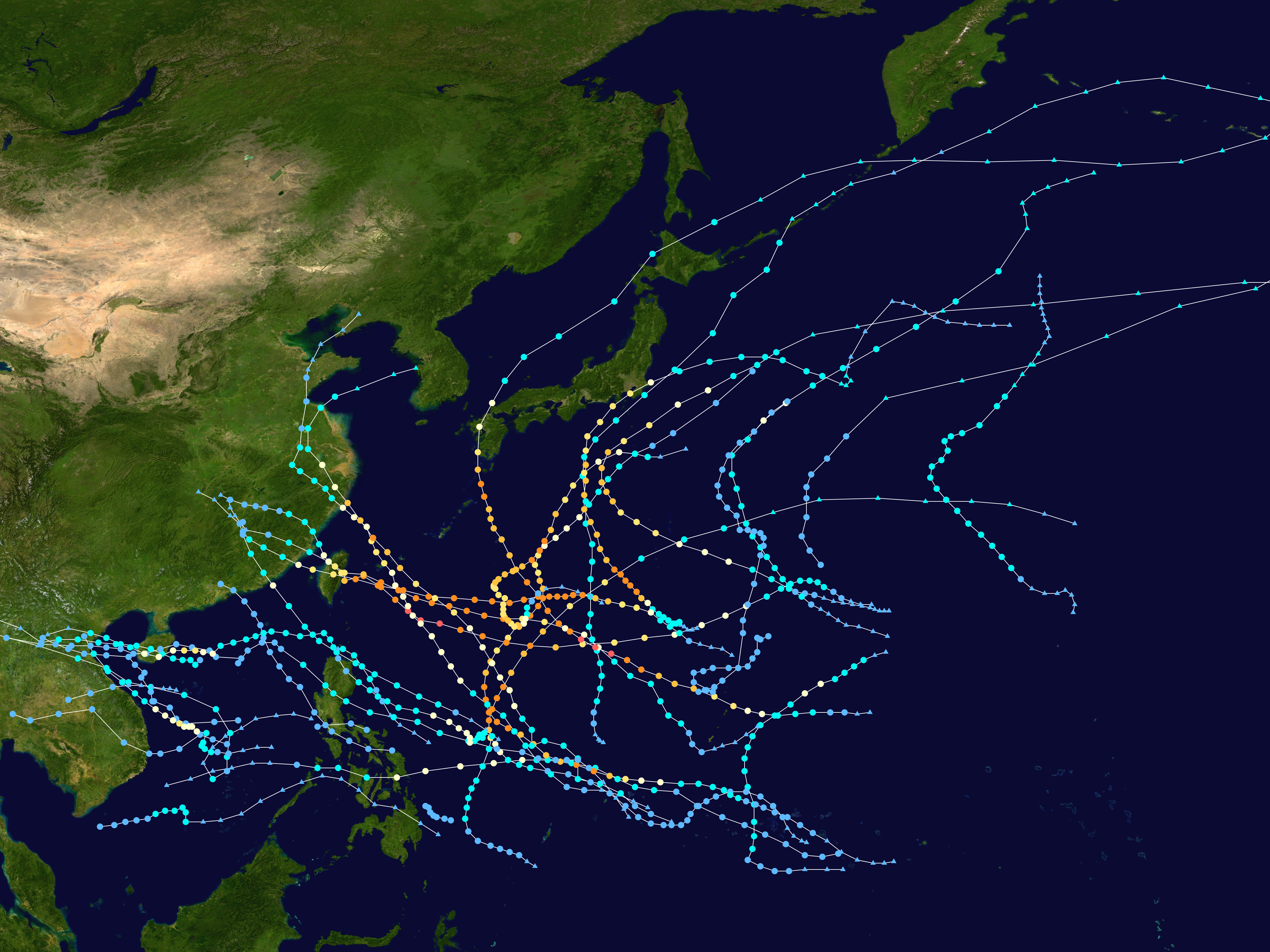
- Season summary map

Season boundaries
- First system formed: January 13, 2005
- Last system dissipated: December 21, 2005

Strongest system
- Name: Haitang
- Maximum winds: 220 km/h (140 mph) (10-minute sustained)
- Lowest pressure: 920 hPa (mbar)

Longest lasting system
- Name: ???
- Duration: ?? days
Storm articles

This timeline documents all of the events of the 2005 Pacific typhoon season, the period that tropical cyclones formed in the Western Pacific Ocean during the year. The scope of this article is limited to the Pacific Ocean, north of the equator between 100°E and the International Date Line. Tropical depressions that form in the basin were given a number with a "W" suffix by the United States' Joint Typhoon Warning Center (JTWC). If a depression intensified into a tropical storm, it would be assigned a name by the Japan Meteorological Agency (JMA). In addition, the Philippine Atmospheric, Geophysical and Astronomical Services Administration (PAGASA) assigned names to tropical cyclones which were in their area of responsibility.

During the season, a total of 33 systems were designated as tropical depressions by either the Japan Meteorological Agency (JMA), the Philippine Atmospheric, Geophysical and Astronomical Services Administration (PAGASA), the Joint Typhoon Warning Center (JTWC), or other national meteorological and hydrological services such as the China Meteorological Administration and the Hong Kong Observatory. Because the JMA runs the Regional Specialized Meteorological Centre for the Western Pacific, they assigned names to these systems once they intensified into a tropical storm. PAGASA also assigned their own local names to systems which were active within their area of responsibility; however, these names are not in common use outside of PAGASA's area of responsibility.

== January ==
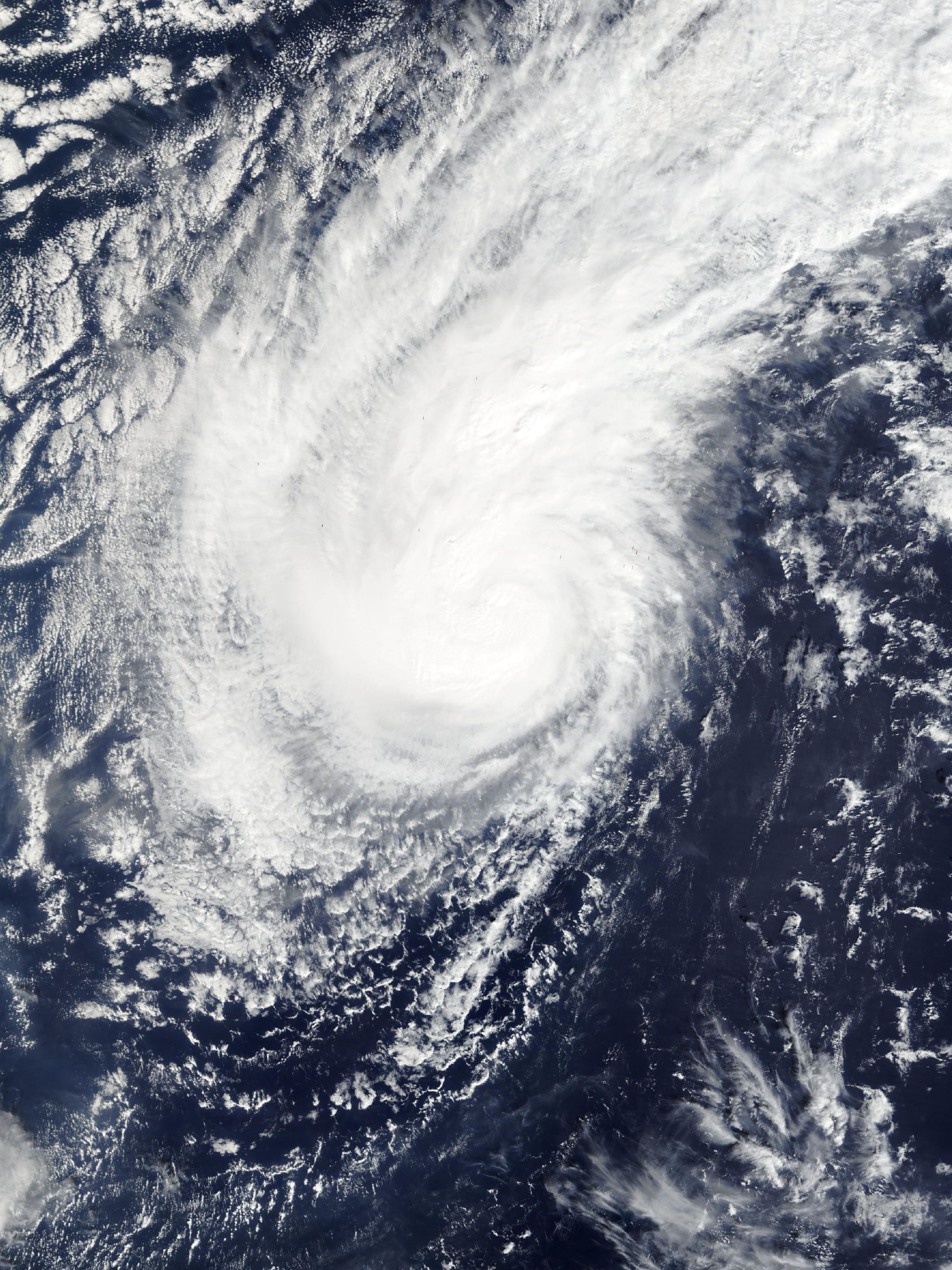
Kulap at peak strength.

January 13
- 1800 UTC – The Joint Typhoon Warning Center (JTWC) designates an area of low pressure as Tropical Depression 01W.
January 14
- 1800 UTC – The JTWC upgrades Tropical Depression 01W to a tropical storm.
January 15
- 1200 UTC – The Japan Meteorological Agency (JMA) designates Tropical Storm 01W as Tropical Storm Kulap.
January 17
- 1200 UTC – The JMA upgrades Tropical Storm Kulap (01W) to a severe tropical storm.
- 1800 UTC – The JTWC upgrades Tropical Storm 01W (Kulap) to a typhoon.
January 18
- 0600 UTC – The JTWC downgrades Typhoon 01W (Kulap) to a tropical storm.
- 1800 UTC – The JTWC issues their final advisory as Tropical Storm 01W (Kulap) starts extratropical transition.
- 1800 UTC – The JMA downgrades Severe Tropical Storm Kulap (01W) to a tropical storm.
January 19
- 0600 UTC – The JMA issue their final advisory on Tropical Storm Kulap (01W) as the system becomes extratropical.

== February ==
No named storms formed in February.

== March ==
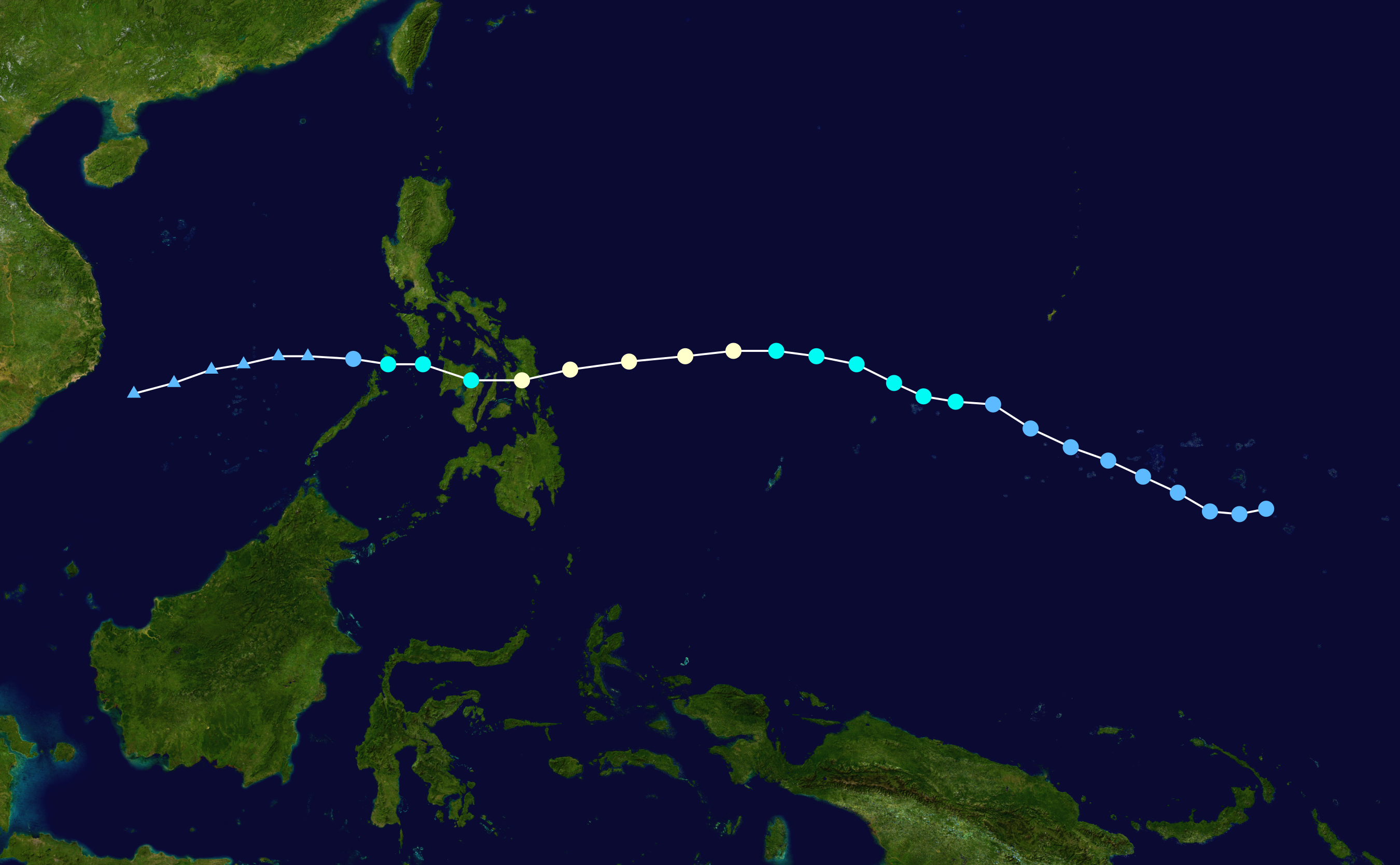
Tracking map of Typhoon Roke by the Joint Typhoon Warning Center

March 13
- 1200 UTC – The JTWC designates an area of low pressure as Tropical Depression 02W.
March 14
- 0600 UTC – The JTWC upgrades Tropical Depression 02W to a tropical storm.
March 15
- 0000 UTC – The JMA designates Tropical Storm 02W as Tropical Storm Roke.
- 1200 UTC – Tropical Storm Roke enters the Philippine area of responsibility and is designated Tropical Storm Auring by PAGASA for Philippine warnings.
- 1800 UTC – The JTWC upgrades Tropical Storm 02W (Roke) to a typhoon.
- 1500 UTC – Tropical Storm Roke (Auring) upgraded to Typhoon Roke (Auring).
March 16
- 0000 UTC – PAGASA upgrades Tropical Storm Auring (Roke) to a severe tropical storm.
- 0600 UTC – The JMA upgrades Tropical Storm Roke (02W) to a severe tropical storm.
- 1200 UTC – Typhoon Roke (Auring) approaching landfall south of Borongan, Philippines.
- 1800 UTC – The JMA downgrades Severe Tropical Storm Roke (02W) to a tropical storm.
March 17
- 0000 UTC – The JTWC downgrades Typhoon 02W (Roke) to a tropical storm.
- 0600 UTC – PAGASA downgrades Severe Tropical Storm Auring (Roke) to a tropical storm.
- 1200 UTC – The JMA downgrades Tropical Storm Roke (02W) to a tropical depression.
- 1800 UTC – The JTWC downgrades Tropical Storm 02W (Roke) to a tropical depression and the final advisory is issued.
- 1800 UTC – PAGASA downgrades Tropical Storm Auring (Roke) to a tropical depression and the final advisory is issued.
March 19
0600 UTC – The JMA downgrades Tropical Depression Roke (02W) to an area of disturbed weather and the final advisory is issued.

== April ==
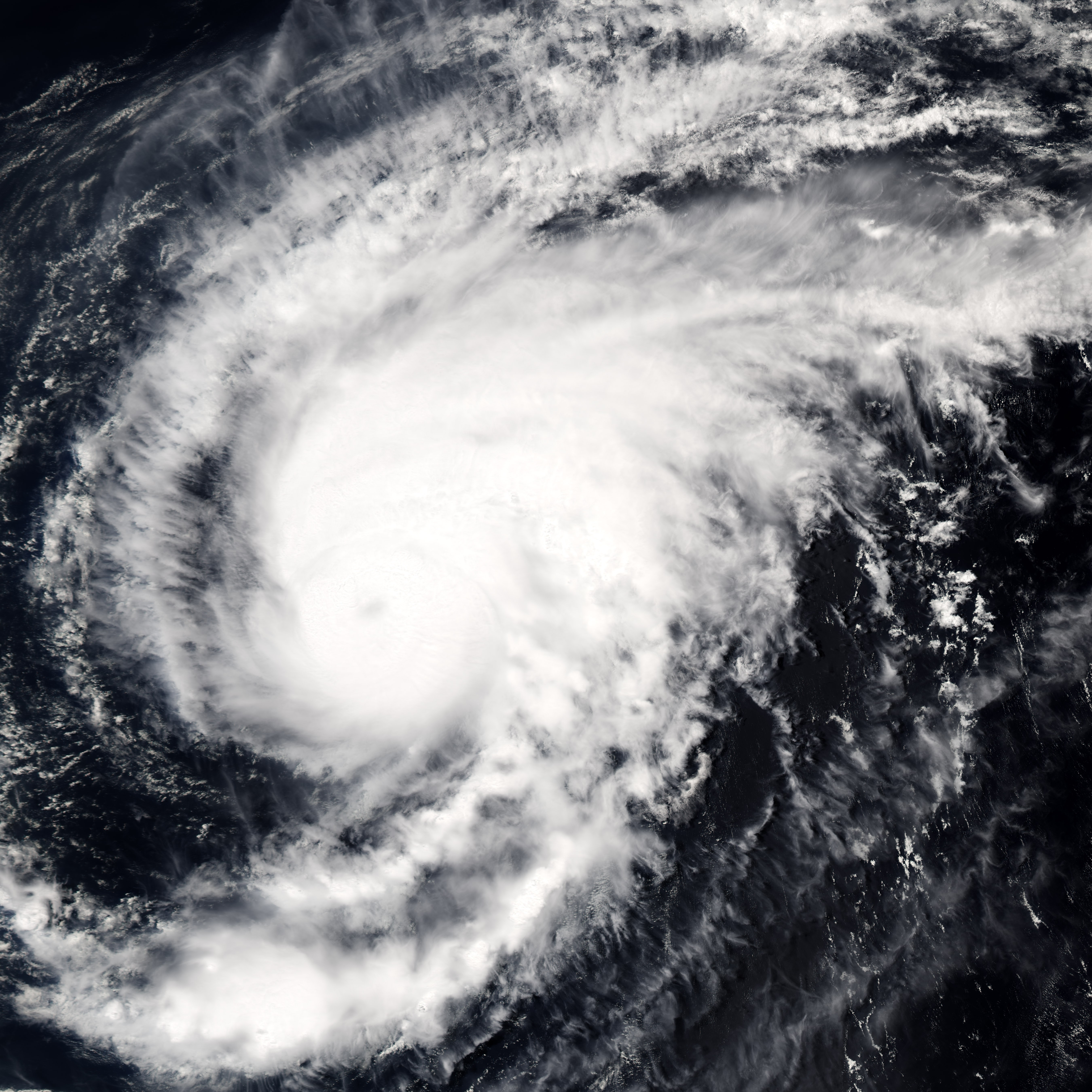
Image of Typhoon Sonca at peak strength

April 20
- 1200 UTC – Tropical Depression 03W forms 275 nautical miles (510 km) east-southeast of Yap Island.
April 22
- 1200 UTC – Tropical Depression 03W enters the Philippine area of responsibility and is designated Tropical Depression Bising by PAGASA for Philippine warnings.
April 23
- 0000 UTC – Tropical Depression 03W (Bising) upgraded to Tropical Storm Sonca (Bising).
- 1800 UTC – Tropical Storm Sonca (Bising) upgraded to Typhoon Sonca (Bising).
April 24
- 0000 UTC – Typhoon Sonca (Bising) upgraded to a category 2 storm.
- 0600 UTC – Typhoon Sonca (Bising) upgraded to a category 3 storm.
- 1800 UTC – Typhoon Sonca (Bising) upgraded to a category 4 storm.
April 26
- 1800 UTC – Typhoon Sonca (Bising) downgraded to Tropical Storm strength and becomes extratropical 45 nautical miles (80 km) west-northwest of Iwo Jima.

== May ==
May 16
- 0000 UTC – PAGASA designates an area of low pressure east of Mindanao, Philippines as Tropical Depression Crising.
May 17
- 0000 UTC – PAGASA reports that Tropical Depression Crising has degenerated into an area of low pressure west of the island of Mindanao.
May 30
- 0600 UTC – Tropical Depression 04W forms 290 nautical miles (540 km) south-southeast of Agana, Guam.
- 1800 UTC – Tropical Depression 04W upgraded to Tropical Storm Nesat.

== June ==
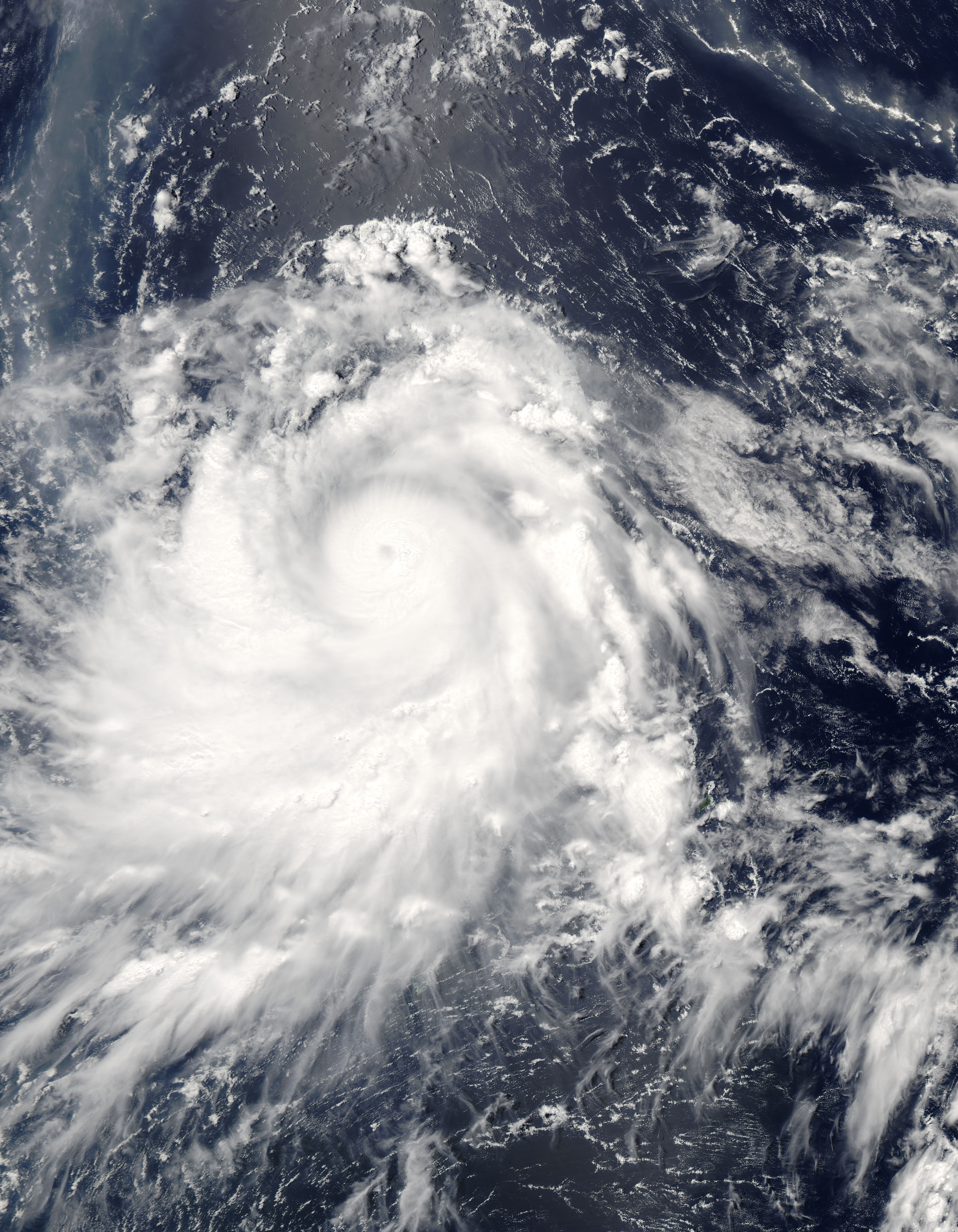
Typhoon Nesat at peak strength.

June 1
- 1200 UTC – Tropical Storm Nesat upgraded to Typhoon Nesat.
- 1800 UTC – Typhoon Nesat intensifies to a category 2 storm.
June 2
- 0000 UTC – Typhoon Nesat rapidly intensifies to a category 4 storm.
- 1800 UTC – Typhoon Nesat enters the Philippine area of responsibility and is assigned the name Typhoon Dante by PAGASA for Philippine warnings.
June 10
- 0000 UTC – Tropical Storm Nesat (Dante) becomes extratropical 275 nautical miles (510 km) southeast of Nagoya.

== July ==
July 4
- 0600 UTC – PAGASA designates Invest.93W as Tropical Depression Emong 35 nautical miles (65 km) northeast of Catarman Samar Island Philippines.
July 5
- 0600 UTC – PAGASA Tropical Depression Emong makes landfall along the eastern coast of Luzon.
July 6
- 0000 UTC – PAGASA Tropical Depression Emong dissipates west of Luzon.
July 11
- 1200 UTC – Tropical Depression 05W forms 110 nautical miles (200 km) southwest of Marcus Island, Japan.
- 1800 UTC – Tropical Depression 05W upgraded to Tropical Storm Haitang.
July 13
- 1800 UTC – Tropical Storm Haitang upgraded to Typhoon Haitang.
July 14
- 1200 UTC – Typhoon Haitang intensifies to a Category 2 storm.
July 15
- 0600 UTC – Typhoon Haitang intensifies to a category 3 storm. Storm has entered the Philippine area of responsibility and is designated Typhoon Feria by PAGASA for Philippine warnings.
- 1200 UTC – Typhoon Haitang (Feria) intensifies to a category 4 storm.
July 16
- 0000 UTC – Typhoon Haitang (Feria) upgraded to category 5 Super Typhoon.
July 17
- 0000 UTC – Typhoon Haitang (Feria) makes landfall at Hualien Taiwan as a category 3 Typhoon.
- 1800 UTC – Typhoon Haitang (Feria) downgraded to Tropical Storm after passing over Taiwan.
July 19
- 0600 UTC – Tropical Storm Haitang (Feria) upgraded to minimal Typhoon. Nearing second landfall on southeast Chinese coast.
- 1200 UTC – Typhoon Haitang (Feria) downgraded to Tropical Storm after making landfall on southeast China coast.
July 20
- 0000 UTC – Tropical Depression 06W forms 330 nautical miles (610 km) north of Wake Island.
- 0600 UTC – Tropical Depression 06W upgraded to Tropical Storm Nalgae. Tropical Depression Haitang (Feria) dissipates Jiangxi, China.
July 21
- 1200 UTC – Tropical Depression 07W forms 300 nautical miles (550 km) north of Yap Island in the Federated States of Micronesia.
- 1800 UTC – Tropical Depression 07W upgraded to Tropical Storm Banyan.
July 23
- 1200 UTC – Tropical Storm Nalgae dissipates 615 nautical miles (1,140 km) north-northeast of Marcus Island, Japan.
July 26
- Tropical Storm Banyan brushes the south and east coasts of Honshū Island, Japan.
July 27
- 0000 UTC – Tropical Storm Banyan becomes extratropical off the north east coast of Honshū Island Japan.
July 28
- 1800 UTC – Tropical Depression 08W forms 215 nautical miles (400 km) south of Hong Kong.
July 29
- 1200 UTC – Tropical Depression 08W upgraded to Tropical Storm Washi.
July 30
- 0000 UTC – Tropical Storm Washi makes landfall on Hainan Island, China.
July 31
- 0000 UTC – Tropical Depression 09W forms 130 nautical miles (240 km) west northwest of Yap Island.
- 0500 UTC – Tropical Storm Washi makes landfall near Nam Định, Vietnam.
- 0600 UTC – Tropical Depression 09W upgraded to Tropical Storm Matsa. Storm enters the Philippine area of responsibility and is assigned the name Tropical Storm Gorio for Philippine warnings.
- 1800 UTC – Tropical Depression Washi dissipates over northern Vietnam.

== August ==
August 2
- 0000 UTC – Tropical Storm Matsa (Gorio) upgraded to Typhoon Matsa (Gorio).
August 4
- 1000 UTC – Typhoon Matsa (Gorio) passes over the Yaeyama Islands of Japan.
- 1200 UTC – Typhoon Matsa (Gorio) intensifies to a Category 2 storm.
August 5
- 1800 UTC – Typhoon Matsa (Gorio) makes landfall near Dajing, China.
August 6
- 0000 UTC – Typhoon Matsa (Gorio) downgraded to a tropical storm.
August 7
- 1200 UTC – Tropical Storm Matsa (Gorio) dissipates near Jiangsu, China.
August 10
- 0000 UTC – Low-pressure system 93W designated Tropical Depression Huaning by PAGASA 320 nautical miles (590 km) east-northeast of Borongan Samar Island, Philippines.
- 1200 UTC – Joint Typhoon Warning Center reclassifies Low-pressure system 93W as Tropical Depression 10W (Huaning).
August 11
- 0000 UTC – Tropical Depression 10W (Huaning) upgraded, receives the more recognized International name Tropical Storm Sanvu (Huaning).
- 2100 UTC – Tropical Storm Sanvu (Huaning) passes over the northern tip of Cagayan on Luzon Island.
August 13
- 0000 UTC – Tropical Storm Sanvu (Huaning) upgraded to Typhoon Sanvu (Huaning).
- 0600 UTC – Typhoon Sanvu (Huaning) makes landfall near Shantou, China. Downgraded to Tropical Storm after landfall.
August 14
- 0000 UTC – Tropical Depression Sanvu (Huaning) dissipates inland near Jiangxi, China.
August 19
- 1500 UTC – Tropical Depression 11W forms in the open Western Pacific.
August 20
- 0000 UTC – Tropical Depression 11W is upgraded to Tropical Storm Mawar.
- 0000 UTC – Tropical Depression 12W forms in the Western Pacific.
August 21
- 0000 UTC – Tropical Storm Mawar is upgraded to Typhoon Mawar.
- 0000 UTC – Tropical Depression 12W is upgraded to Tropical Storm Guchol.
- 0600 UTC – Typhoon Mawar upgraded to a category 3 storm.
August 22
- 0000 UTC – Typhoon Mawar upgraded to a category 4 storm and with 130-knot (240 km/h) winds becomes Super Typhoon Mawar.
- 0600 UTC – Super Typhoon Mawar still a category 4 storm but at 125 knots (232 km/h), downgraded to Typhoon Mawar.
August 25
- 0000 UTC – Tropical Storm Guchol becomes extratropical in the North Pacific.
- 1800 UTC – Typhoon Mawar makes landfall in Japan as a Category 2 typhoon.
August 26
- 0600 UTC – Tropical Depression 13W forms northeast of Yap.
- 1200 UTC – Typhoon Mawar downgraded to Tropical Storm Mawar after landfall near Tokyo Bay.
August 27
- 0000 UTC – Tropical Storm Mawar becomes extratropical east of Japan.
- 0000 UTC – Tropical Depression 13W upgraded to Tropical Storm Talim.
August 28
- 0600 UTC – Tropical Storm Talim upgraded to Typhoon Talim.
August 29
- 0000 UTC – Typhoon Talim enters the Philippine area of responsibility and is assigned the name Typhoon Isang for Philippine warnings.
- 0000 UTC – Typhoon Talim (Isang) upgraded to a Category 2 storm.
- 0600 UTC – Tropical Depression 14W forms 365 nautical miles (675 km) east of Saipan.
- 0600 UTC – Typhoon Talim (Isang) upgraded to a Category 3 storm.
- 1200 UTC – Typhoon Talim (Isang) upgraded to a Category 4 storm.
- 1800 UTC – Tropical Depression 14W upgraded to Tropical Storm Nabi.
August 30
- 1200 UTC – Tropical Storm Nabi upgraded to Typhoon Nabi.
August 31
- 0000 UTC – Typhoon Nabi upgraded to a Category 2 storm.
- 1200 UTC – Typhoon Nabi upgraded to a Category 3 storm.
- 1800 UTC – Typhoon Talim (Isang) makes landfall in Taiwan.

== September ==
September 1
- 0000 UTC – Typhoon Talim (Isang) downgraded to a Category 1 storm over Taiwan Strait.
- 0600 UTC – Typhoon Talim (Isang) downgraded to a Tropical Storm after landfall in China.
- 1200 UTC – Tropical Storm Talim (Isang) dissipates west of Fuzhou China.
- 1200 UTC – Typhoon Nabi upgraded to a Category 4 storm.
- 1800 UTC – Typhoon Nabi upgraded to a Category 5 storm and Super Typhoon Nabi.
September 3
- 0000 UTC – Super Typhoon Nabi enters the Philippine area of responsibility and is assigned the name Super Typhoon Jolina for Philippine warnings.
September 5
- 1800 UTC – Typhoon Nabi (Jolina) makes landfall in Kagoshima Prefecture, Japan.
- 1800 UTC – Tropical Depression 15W forms east of Yap.
September 6
- 0000 UTC – Tropical Depression 15W upgraded to Tropical Storm 15W.
- 0600 UTC – Typhoon Nabi (Jolina) downgraded after landfall to Tropical Storm Nabi (Jolina).
- 1800 UTC – Tropical Storm Nabi (Jolina) becomes extratropical 30 nautical miles (55 km) west-northwest of Oki Island, Japan.
- 1800 UTC – Tropical Storm 15W enters the Philippine area of responsibility and is assigned the name Tropical Storm Kiko for Philippine warnings.
September 7
- 0000 UTC – Tropical Storm 15W (Kiko) assigned the name Tropical Storm Khanun by Japan Meteorological Agency.
September 8
- 1200 UTC – Tropical Storm Khanun (Kiko) strengthens into Typhoon Khanun (Kiko).
September 9
- 1200 UTC – Typhoon Khanun (Kiko) upgraded to a category 2 storm.
September 10
- 0600 UTC – Typhoon Khanun (Kiko) upgraded to a category 3 storm.
- 1800 UTC – Typhoon Khanun (Kiko) upgraded to a category 4 storm.
September 11
- 0600 UTC – Typhoon Khanun (Kiko) makes landfall in eastern China 120 nautical miles (220 km) south of Shanghai as a category 2 storm.
- 1800 UTC – Typhoon Khanun (Kiko) downgraded to a tropical storm.
- 1800 UTC – Tropical Storm Khanun (Kiko) dissipates over China.
September 16
- 0000 UTC – Tropical Depression 16W forms east of Vietnam.
- 1800 UTC – Tropical Depression 16W upgraded to Tropical Storm Vicente.
September 18
- 0600 UTC – Tropical Storm Vicente makes landfall 75 nautical miles (140 km) northwest of Huế, Vietnam.
- 1200 UTC – Tropical Storm Vicente downgraded to Tropical Depression Vicente, dissipating inland.
September 19
- 0900 UTC – PAGASA begins issuing advisories on Tropical Disturbance Labuyo.
September 20
- 0000 UTC – Japan Meteorological Agency begins issuing marine warnings on a Tropical Depression.
- 1200 UTC – Tropical Disturbance Labuyo upgraded to Tropical Depression 17W (Labuyo).
- 1200 UTC – Tropical Depression 18W forms 220 nautical miles (410 km) southwest of Marcus Island, Japan.
September 21
- 0000 UTC – Tropical Depression 18W upgraded to Tropical Storm Saola.
- 0300 UTC – Tropical Depression 17W (Labuyo) upgraded to Tropical Storm Damrey (Labuyo).
September 22
- 0300 UTC – Tropical Storm Saola upgraded to Typhoon Saola.
- 1800 UTC – Typhoon Saola upgraded to Category 2 storm.
September 24
- 2100 UTC – Tropical Storm Damrey (Labuyo) upgraded to Typhoon Damrey (Labuyo).
September 25
- 0900 UTC – Typhoon Damrey (Labuyo) upgraded to Category 2 storm.
- 2000 UTC – Typhoon Damrey (Labuyo) makes first landfall in Wanning, Hainan Province, China.
- 2100 UTC – Typhoon Saola downgraded to Tropical Storm Saola.
September 26
- 0000 UTC – Tropical Storm Saola becomes extratropical off the coast of Japan.
- 0000 UTC – Joint Typhoon Warning Center initiates warning for Tropical Depression 19W which formed 335 nautical miles (620 km) south-southeast of Iwo Jima, Japan.
- 0900 UTC – Tropical Depression 19W upgraded to Tropical Storm Longwang.
September 27
- 0300 UTC – Tropical Storm Longwang upgraded to Typhoon Longwang.
- 0900 UTC – Joint Typhoon Warning Center issues its last advisory on Tropical Storm Damrey (Labuyo), located 90 nautical miles (170 km) south-southwest of Hanoi dissipating inland.
- 0900 UTC – Typhoon Longwang upgraded to a category 2 storm.
- 1800 UTC – Typhoon Longwang upgraded to a category 3 storm.
September 28
- 0600 UTC – Typhoon Longwang upgraded to a category 4 storm.
September 29
- 0000 UTC – Typhoon Longwang enters the Philippine area of responsibility and is assigned the name Typhoon Maring for Philippine warnings.
- 1200 UTC – Typhoon Longwang (Maring) upgraded to Super Typhoon Longwang (Maring).
September 30
- 0900 UTC – Super Typhoon Longwang (Maring) downgraded to Typhoon Longwang (Maring).

== October ==
October 1
- 2100 UTC – Typhoon Longwang (Maring) makes landfall near Hualien City, Taiwan as a category 4 storm.
October 2
- 1335 UTC – Typhoon Longwang (Maring) makes second landfall in Fujian Province, China.
- 2100 UTC – The Joint Typhoon Warning Center issues its last advisory on Tropical Storm Longwang (Maring), located over China about 200 nautical miles (370 km) west of Taipei, Taiwan, and dissipating inland.
October 6
- 0000 UTC – Local bureaus initiate warnings for a low-pressure system near Hainan island.
October 7
- 1500 UTC – Joint Typhoon Warning Center initiates warnings for Tropical Depression 20W, slightly south-west of Hainan island.
- 2100 UTC – Joint Typhoon Warning Center issues final warning for Tropical Depression 20W, 55 nautical miles (102 km) west-northwest of Huế, Vietnam.
October 9
- 1200 UTC – Japan Meteorological Agency initiates warnings for a tropical depression, previously classified Tropical Depression 21W by the JTWC.
October 10
- 0000 UTC – Tropical Depression 21W enters the Philippine area of responsibility and is assigned the name Tropical Depression Nando for Philippine warnings.
- 0600 UTC – Tropical Depression 21W (Nando) strengthens into Tropical Storm Kirogi (Nando).
October 11
- 1500 UTC – Tropical Storm Kirogi (Nando) strengthens into Typhoon Kirogi (Nando).
- 1800 UTC – Typhoon Kirogi (Nando) upgraded to a Category 2 typhoon by JMA.
- 2100 UTC – Typhoon Kirogi (Nando) upgraded to a Category 3 typhoon by JTWC.
October 12
- 0900 UTC – Typhoon Kirogi (Nando) upgraded to a Category 4 typhoon by JTWC.
October 15
- 2100 UTC – Typhoon Kirogi (Nando) re-upgraded to a Category 3 typhoon by JTWC.
October 16
- 0900 UTC – Typhoon Kirogi (Nando) re-upgraded to a Category 4 typhoon by JTWC.
October 19
- 0300 UTC – Typhoon Kirogi (Nando) becomes extratropical off the coast of Japan.
October 28
- 2100 UTC – Joint Typhoon Warning Center initiates warnings for Tropical Depression 22W, 15 hours after the Japan Meteorological Agency issued a marine warning.
October 29
- 0000 UTC – Tropical Depression 22W upgraded to Tropical Storm Kai-tak.
October 30
- 0000 UTC – Tropical Storm Kai-tak upgraded to Typhoon Kai-tak.
- 0300 UTC – Typhoon Kai-tak reaches Category 2 intensity.

== November ==
November 2
- 0300 UTC – Tropical Storm Kai-tak makes landfall 205 nautical miles (380 km) south-southeast of Hanoi.
- 1500 UTC – Advisories are discontinued for Tropical Storm Kai-tak, dissipating inland 60 nautical miles (110 km) south-southwest of Hanoi.
November 7
- 0900 UTC – Tropical Depression 23W forms 75 nautical miles (139 km) north-northwest of Yap.
- 2100 UTC – Tropical Depression 23W upgraded to Tropical Storm 23W.
November 9
- 0900 UTC – Tropical Depression 23W (Ondoy) re-upgraded to Tropical Storm 23W (Ondoy).
November 10
- 0300 UTC – Tropical Storm 23W (Ondoy) designated as Tropical Storm Tembin (Ondoy).
- circa 1600 UTC – Tropical Storm Tembin (Ondoy) makes landfall in northern Philippines.
November 11
- 0300 UTC – Tropical Depression Tembin (Ondoy) dissipates over Taiwan.
November 13
- 1500 UTC – Tropical Depression 24W forms south-southwest of Palau.
November 14
- 0000 UTC – Tropical Depression 24W named Tropical Depression Pepeng by PAGASA.
November 15
- 0600 UTC – Tropical Depression 24W (Pepeng) upgraded to Tropical Storm 24W (Pepeng).
November 16
- 0000 UTC – Tropical Storm 24W (Pepeng) redesignated Tropical Storm Bolaven (Pepeng).
November 17
- 0000 UTC – Tropical Storm Bolaven (Pepeng) upgraded to Typhoon Bolaven (Pepeng).
November 20
- Circa 0000 UTC – Tropical Storm Bolaven (Pepeng) makes landfall in northeastern Philippines.
- 1200 UTC – Tropical Depression Bolaven (Pepeng) dissipates north of the Philippines, and advisories are discontinued.

== December ==
December 18
- 1500 UTC – Tropical Depression 25W forms near the northern tip of Borneo.
December 19
- ca. 0300 UTC – Tropical Depression 25W (Quedan) strengthens into Tropical Storm 25W.
December 20
0600 UTC – Tropical Storm 25W (Quedan) dissipates and advisories are discontinued.

== See also ==
- 2005 Pacific typhoon season
- List of Pacific typhoon seasons
- Timeline of the 2005 Atlantic hurricane season
- Timeline of the 2005 Pacific hurricane season
