= Jiangjun District =

District in Tainan, Taiwan

Coordinates: 23°12′34.9″N 120°7′35.8″E

Jiangjun 將軍區 Jiangjyun
- District
- Jiangjun District
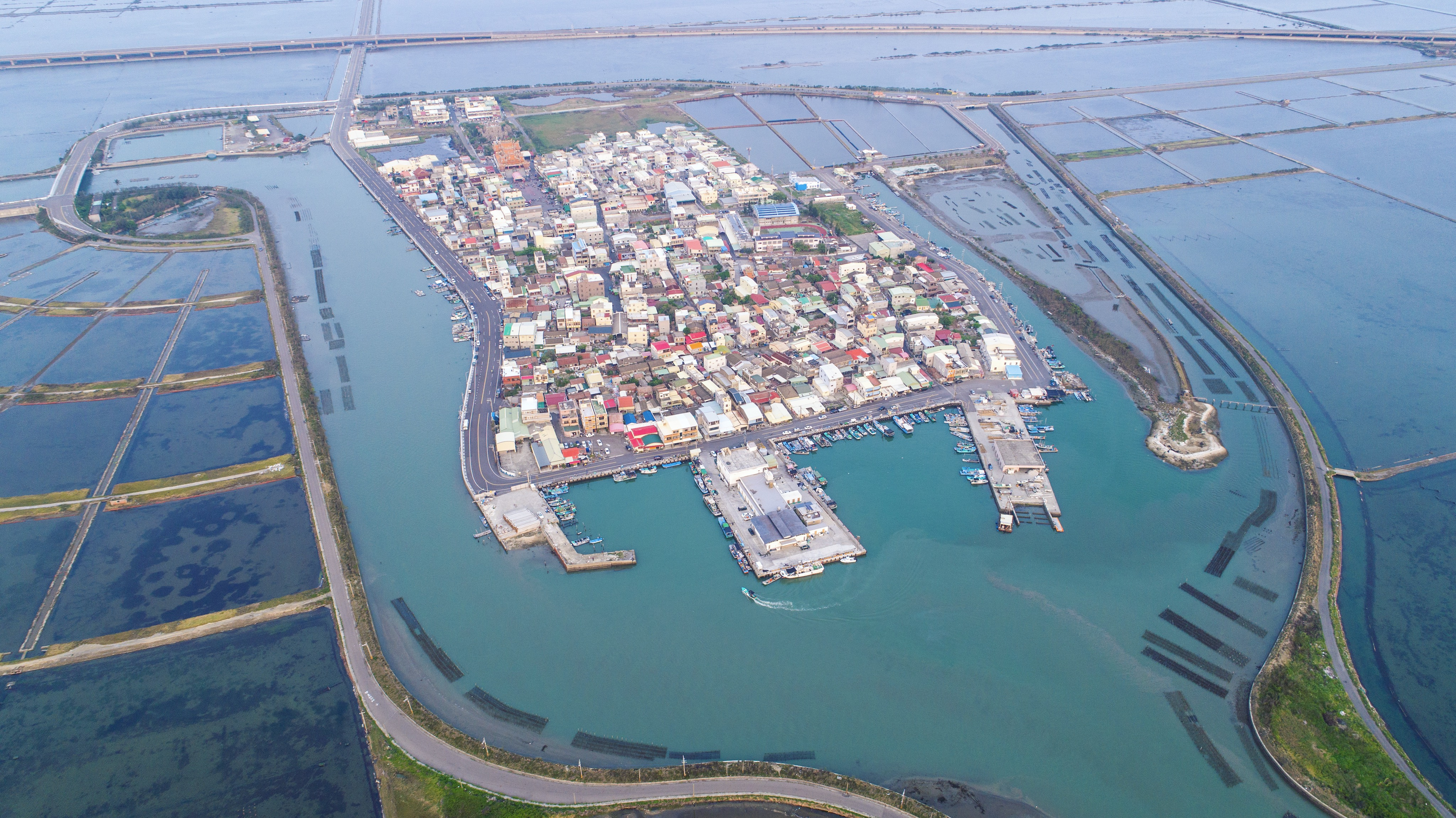
- Kunshen in Jiangjun District, surrounded on all sides by waterways

- Jiangjun District in Tainan City
- Location: Tainan, Taiwan

Area
  - Total: 42 km^{2} (16 sq mi)

Population (May 2022)
  - Total: 18,745
  - Density: 450/km^{2} (1,200/sq mi)
- Website: jiangjun.tainan.gov.tw/en/

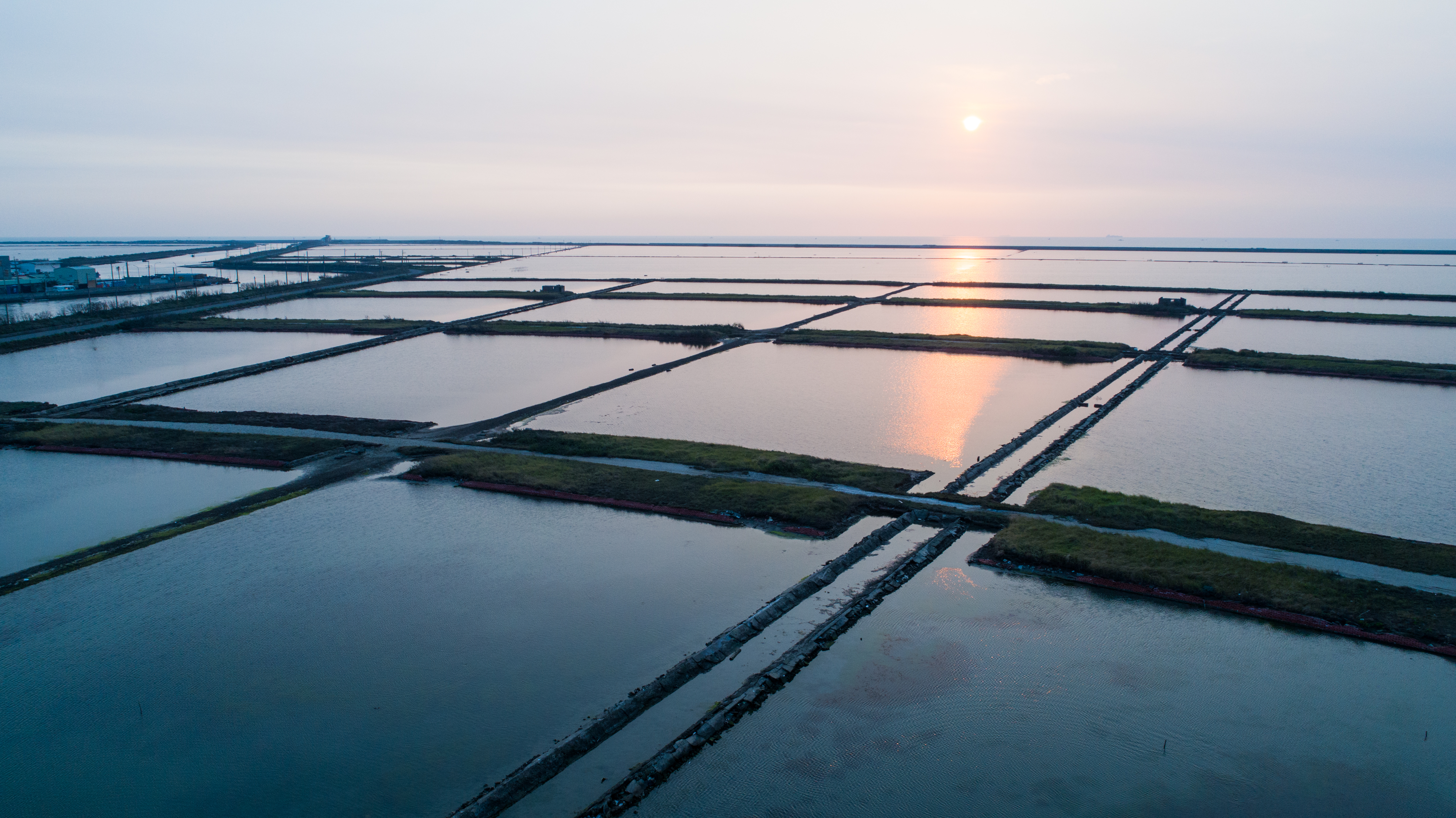
Salt ponds in Jiangjun District

Jiangjun District (Chinese: 將軍區; Hanyu Pinyin: Jiāngjūn Qū; Tongyong Pinyin: Jiangjyun Cyu; Wade–Giles: Chiang^{1}-chün^{1} Ch'ü^{1}; Pe̍h-ōe-jī: Chiong-kun-khu) is a rural district of about 18,745 residents in Tainan, Taiwan. Its Chinese name translates to "general officer".

== History ==
After the handover of Taiwan from Japan to the Republic of China in 1945, Jiangjun was organized as a rural township of Tainan County. On 25 December 2010, Tainan County was merged with Tainan City and Jiangjun was upgraded to a district of the city.

== Geography ==
Jiangjun is located on the west coast of Taiwan, and has a harbor and a beach. Its population as of 2016 is 20,286.

== Administrative divisions ==
Zhangrong, Xihua, Xihe, Zhongxing, Jiachang, Baoyuan, Linghe, Renhe, Beipu, Jiangfu, Jianggui, Sanji, Yushan, Guangshan, Zhangsha, Pingsha, Kunshen and Kunming Village.

== Tourist attractions ==
- Fangyuan Museum of Arts
- Mashagou Seaside Resort
