= Labor Union of National Taiwan University =

Former union based in Taipei, Taiwan

- 國立臺灣大學工會
- Founded: 19 December 2012
- Headquarters: National Taiwan University, Taipei Taiwan
- Affiliations: Chinese Federation of Labor
- Website: ntu-laborunion.blogspot.com

The Labor Union of National Taiwan University (LUNTU; Chinese: 國立臺灣大學工會; pinyin: Guólì Táiwān Dàxué Gōnghuì), proposed by full-time research assistants, contract staffs, and school-time workers, was a labor union that organized the workers at the National Taiwan University. And on 9 December 2012, it convened the inaugural meeting at Taipei Taiwan. Then, according to the "Trade Union Law" of Taiwan, on 1 April 2013, the Taipei City Government approved the establishment of the LUNTU, as an enterprise union to tertiary institutions.
