= Fangyuan Art Museum =

Museum in Jiangjun, Tainan, Taiwan

- 方圓美術館
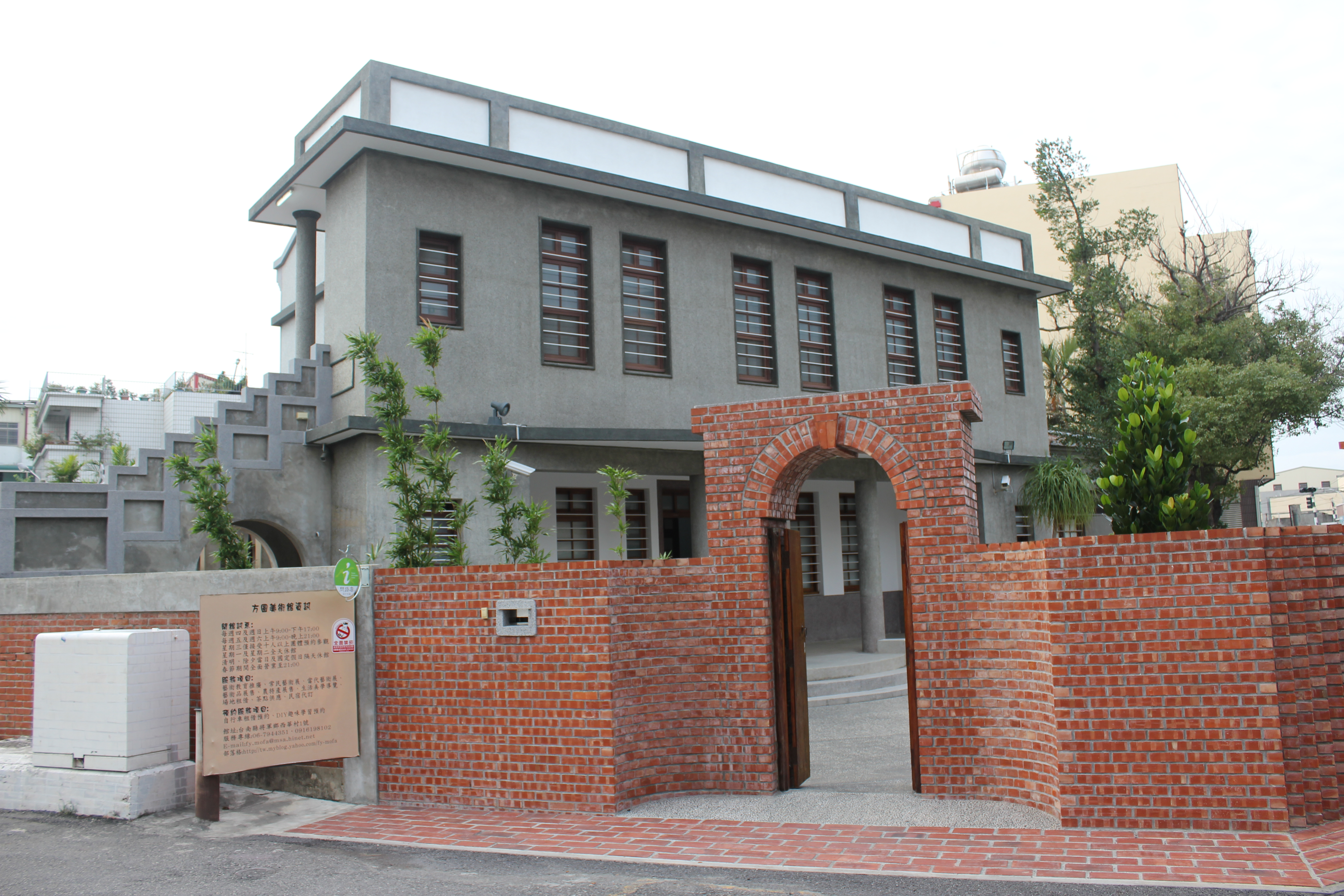
- Established: 24 November 2008
- Location: Jiangjun, Tainan, Taiwan
- Coordinates: 23°11′57″N 120°09′26″E
- Type: art museum
- Website: Official website

The Fangyuan Art Museum (traditional Chinese: 方圓美術館; simplified Chinese: 方圆美术馆; pinyin: Fāngyuán Měishùguǎn) is an art museum in Xihua Borough, Jiangjun District, Tainan, Taiwan.

== History ==
The museum building was originally constructed in 1944 as Sui Garden, the residence of the first mayor of Jiangjun Township, Huang Qing-wu. Later, he turned it into the Suisheng Clinic. In 2008, the building was purchased by an entrepreneur, Lin Chen-feng. He then rebuilt it to be a museum of fine arts.

== Architecture ==
The building is a mix of Taiwanese and Western architectural styles featuring a 4-section compound with corridors and winding, arched cloisters. The front section of the building was built in a Western architectural style, and the back section is connected to Sanheyuan.

== Exhibitions ==
The museum displays pottery and porcelain, which were commonly used in early Taiwan.

== See also ==
- List of museums in Taiwan
