= Liao Fu-pen =

Taiwanese politician (1938–2012)

Liao Fu-pen MLY
- 廖福本

Member of the Legislative Yuan
- In office 1 February 1984 – 31 January 2002
- Constituency: Yunlin County

Personal details
- Born: 1 June 1938 Taipei, Taiwan
- Died: 20 June 2012 (aged 74) Zhongzheng, Taipei, Taiwan
- Party: Kuomintang
- Education: National University of Tainan; National Taiwan Normal University; Chinese Culture University
- Occupation: Politician

Liao Fu-pen (Chinese: 廖福本; pinyin: Liào Fúběn; 1 June 1938 – 20 June 2012) was a Taiwanese politician who served in the Legislative Yuan from 1984 to 2002.

== Education ==
Liao studied at National University of Tainan and National Taiwan Normal University before earning a master's degree from Chinese Culture University. He then became a teacher.

== Political career ==
Liao was first seated to the Legislative Yuan in 1984, as a member of the Kuomintang. He considered joining the People First Party shortly after its formation in 2000, but remained affiliated with the KMT throughout his time in office. In August 2000, prosecutors searched properties owned by Liao, as he was suspected of selling fake shares of Chi Mei Optoelectronics Corporation. The investigation was slated to continue at Liao's legislative office in Taipei, but President of the Legislative Yuan Wang Jin-pyng barred such a search. Liao was indicted on charges of graft related to the Chi Mei case in February 2001. In November, separate charges of check fraud were brought against Liao.

In 2007, Liao was brought in for questioning on a third case dating back to 1998, involving bribes distributed by the National Chinese Herbal Apothecary Association. He was subsequently indicted and charged with bribery in January 2008. The Taipei District Court sentenced Liao to eight and a half years imprisonment in January 2009. Additionally, his civil rights were suspended for six years. The court also ruled that Liao was to return NT$6 million to the association. Upon appeal to the Taiwan High Court, Liao's sentence was upheld. He was granted medical parole in November 2011, and died at the age of 74 on 20 June 2012 of multiple organ failure while seeking treatment at National Taiwan University Hospital. All charges against Liao were thrown out in August 2012, because he had died during the court proceedings.
