= The Harvard Project for Asian and International Relations =

Harvard College Project for Asian and International Relations
- Abbreviation: HPAIR
- Formation: 1991; 35 years ago
- Type: Non-profit
- Purpose: International relations and global engagement with Asia
- Headquarters: Cambridge, Massachusetts
- Official language: English
- Presidents: Gulirano Almuratova, Henry Chen, Michelle Jiang
- Parent organization: Harvard University
- Website: http://hpair.org/

The Harvard College Project for Asian and International Relations (HPAIR) is a student-led not-for-profit organization associated with the Harvard University Faculty of Arts and Sciences. HPAIR currently holds two annual conferences that bring together international students and eminent individuals in the fields of academia, politics and business - the Harvard Conference and the Asia Conference.

Established in 1991, HPAIR aims to enable distinguished students to participate in an open forum on Asian and international issues with global leaders in fields ranging from international relations to technology and the fine arts.

HPAIR is an organization run entirely by Harvard University. HPAIR's Asia Conference is Harvard University's largest annual student event in Asia. Since its founding in 1991, HPAIR has held over 40 conferences in locations ranging from Mumbai to Kuala Lumpur.

== Harvard Conference ==
The Harvard Conference was first held in 2008 on the Harvard University campus. Each year, up to 600 international students and young professionals come together at the Harvard Conference to explore pertinent issues concerning the Asia region, including equitable access to global health, foreign policy, environmental issues, media, and entrepreneurship. Attendees have the opportunity to discuss these issues in-depth through plenary sessions, panels, seminars, and case studies.

=== Harvard Conferences by Theme ===
Year	Theme
2008	Cosmopolitan Asia: Diversity and Disparity
2009	Linking Minds: Asia in the 21st Century
2010	Asia Ascendant: Seizing New Heights
2011	Looking Back, Forging Ahead: Asia in Pursuit of a Vibrant Future
2012	Cross-Cultural Connections: Weaving New Silk Roads
2013	East Meets West: Sustainable Development in the 21st Century
2014	The Many Faces of Asia: Shaping Identities in a Dynamic World
2015	Asia’s Blueprint for Growth: Building an Inclusive Future
2016	Transcending Borders: Global Cooperation on Emerging Challenges in Asia
2017	Navigating the Future in the Age of Innovation
2018	Innovate
2019	Ignite: Inspiring a New Global Narrative
2020	Striking a balance: Vision of a Conflicted World
2021	Embracing Change
2022	Finding Our Future

== Asia Conference ==
The HPAIR Asia Conference is a 5-day academic program in mid-August in an Asian city. The conference integrates the contents of the academic and business world to create a hybrid structure. Delegates benefit from gaining a broader exposure to issues spanning multiple arenas, including political, social, economic, cultural, and business.

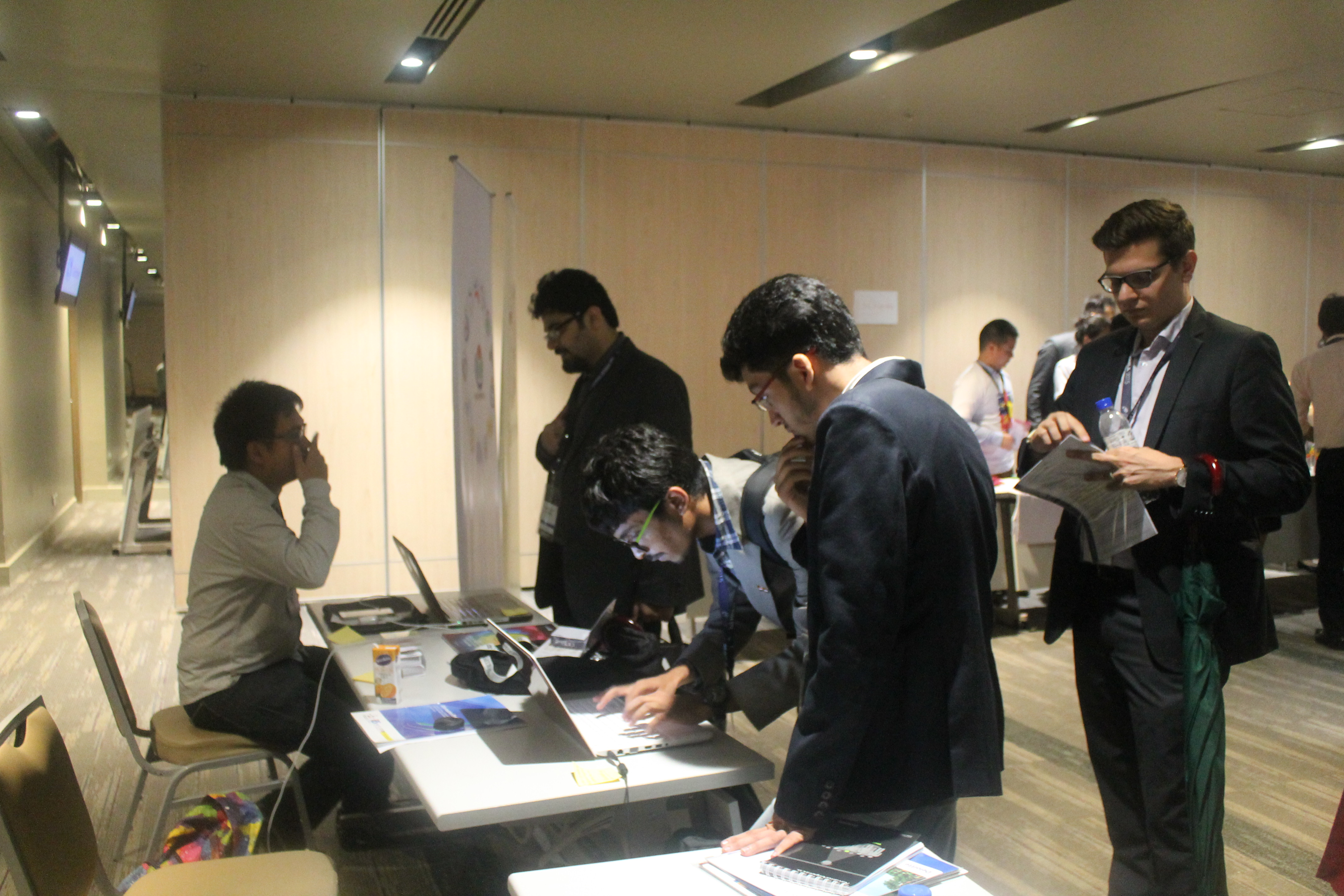
Delegates arrive at an HPAIR Asia Conference in the Philippines, 2015

The 2019 Asia Conference was held in Kazakhstan from August 16–20, co-organized by Nazarbayev University in Nur-Sultan, Kazakhstan.

There are six conference tracks, namely:

- Art, Media & Culture
- Energy and Environmental Stability
- Global Markets & the Economy
- Governance & Geopolitics
- Science & Technology
- Social Policy & Justice

The Asia Conference started off in 1992 in Taipei, back then known as the Academic Conference. Bringing together a diverse group of speakers and about 300 graduate and undergraduate students from across the world, the Academic Conference takes the form of six workshops that explore, through research and discussion, issues ranging from environmentalism to cultural trends.

In 2004, HPAIR started the Business Conference, which invited many prominent figures from the world of business, government and law to discuss their understanding of Asia and its place in the global economy with more than 300 business students and young professionals. As of 2012, HPAIR has merged the Academic Conference and the Business Conference into a single conference, the Asia Conference, which brings together 600 pre-eminent young professionals from around the world.

=== Asia Conference in Previous Years ===
1992	Taipei, Taiwan	International Trade and Investment	
1993	British Hong Kong	A Free Trade Area for the Pacific Century	
1994	Manila, Philippines	Economic Cooperation for the Pacific Century	
1995	Jakarta, Indonesia	Sustaining the Miracle: Challenges Facing Asian Development	
1996	(South Korea) Seoul, Korea	The Challenges of Globalization: Creating Common Ground in the 21st Century	Seoul National University
1997	Bangkok, Thailand	Building Nations, Building Communities	
1998	Kuala Lumpur, Malaysia	Asia in Transition: Beyond the Miracle	
1999	Hong Kong, China	Asia at the Crossroads: Rising to the Challenges of Reform	The Chinese University of Hong Kong
2000	Beijing, China	Diversity and Convergence: Resolving Asia's Role in the Global Community	
2001	Singapore	Asia and the Knowledge Economy: Opportunities for Progress	
2002	Sydney, Australia	Traditions and Transformations: New Perspectives of Progress	
2003	(South Korea) Seoul, Korea	Integration and Innovation: Finding Common Ground for a Dynamic Asia	Sookmyung Women's University
2004	Shanghai, China	The Once and Future Asia: Expanding Horizons, Historic Transitions	
2005	Tokyo, Japan	Futuring Asia: Contemporary Challenges and Emerging Realities	University of Tokyo
2006	Mumbai, India	Harvard College Asian Business Forum	
2006	Singapore	Redefining Asia: Visions and Realities	National University of Singapore
2007	Hong Kong, China	Engaging Asia: Competition and Collaboration (Business Conference)	University of Hong Kong
2007	Beijing, China	Engaging Asia: Discourse and Dialogue (Academic Conference)	Students in Beijing
2008	Kuala Lumpur, Malaysia	Emerging into Focus: Asia Incorporated (Business Conference)	
2008	Kuala Lumpur, Malaysia	Beyond Borders: Asia on the World Stage (Academic Conference)	Universiti Malaya
2009	Tokyo, Japan	Braving New Frontiers: Tomorrow’s Ventures Today (Business Conference)	Waseda University
2009	(South Korea) Seoul, Korea	Evolving Asia: Path-ways in the Global Era (Academic Conference)	Sungkyunkwan University
2010	Singapore	Sustaining Momentum: Ten Years into the Asian Century	Singapore Management University
2011	(South Korea) Seoul, Korea	At the Crossroads: Decisions in a Dynamic Asia	Yonsei University
2012	Taipei, Taiwan	Challenges and Prospects: Envisioning Global Transformations	National Chengchi University
2013	Dubai, United Arab Emirates	Extending Horizons: Charting Asia's Flourishing Future	American University in Dubai
2014	Tokyo, Japan	Reflection and Progression: Fostering Mutual Growth	Keio University
2015	Manila, Philippines	Confronting Asia's Development Challenges Through Innovation	De La Salle University
2016	Hong Kong SAR, China	Empower	The Chinese University of Hong Kong
2017	Sydney, Australia	Aspire	The University of Sydney
2018	Kuala Lumpur, Malaysia	Sustainable Disruption	Sunway University
2019	Nur-Sultan, Kazakhstan	Passion for Change	Nazarbayev University
2021	Taipei, Taiwan	Reinventing with Resilience	
2022	New Delhi, India		Indraprastha Institute of Information Technology, Delhi
2023	Hong Kong SAR, China	Architects of Asia: Building Tomorrow	Hong Kong University of Science and Technology
2024	Bangkok, Thailand	Reimagining Connectivity: Building Bridges in a Globalized Society	Chulalongkorn University

== Notable Speakers ==
HPAIR conferences are often led by a diverse group of speakers prominent in various areas of society.

Conferences have drawn many top-tier political leaders such as former President of the Republic of Korea Kim Dae-jung, Crown Prince of Perak Raja Nazrin Shah, Finance Secretary of the Republic of the Philippines Dr. Jesus P. Estanislao, and President of Singapore S. R. Nathan. The former Foreign Minister of the Republic of Korea and the former Secretary-General of the United Nations Ban Ki-moon has spoken at an HPAIR conference.

Many speakers also hail from influential international organizations, like the United Nations or the Association of Southeast Asian Nations (ASEAN). Speakers from ASEAN include the current Secretary-General of ASEAN Surin Pitsuwan and the former Secretary-General of ASEAN Ong Keng Yong.

HPAIR often invites speakers who are successful in the world of business, like the Chairman and CEO of Ayala Corporation Jaime Augusto Zobel de Ayala (Harvard '81 / HBS '87), CEO of Haier Zhang Ruimin, Chairman of Prudential Asia Victor Fung and President of Goldman Sachs Asia Philip D. Murphy.
