= Chan Yun =

Taiwanese Buddhist monk and teacher of meditation

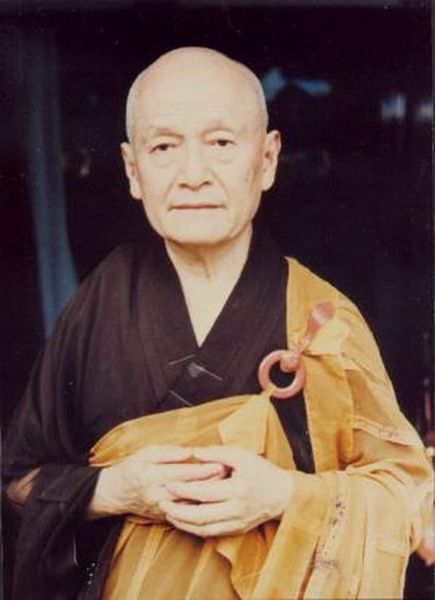
- Venerable Master Chan Yun at age 91

Personal life
- Born: October 18, 1915 Andong province, China
- Died: March 7, 2009 (aged 93) Shuili township, Nantou county, Taiwan

Religious life
- Religion: Buddhism
- School: Vinaya, Pure Land Buddhism, Zen

Chan Yun (Chinese: 懺雲法師, October 18, 1915 – March 7, 2009) was a renowned Buddhist monk, teacher and cultivator. The abbot of the Lianyin Temple (Chinese: 蓮因寺), Chan Yun was one of many mainstream Buddhist teachers in Taiwan.

== Early life ==
Master Chan-Yun was born in 1915 at a small village in the Andong province, China, which the village near the border between Mainland China and Korea. When he was young, he had been to Japan for learning fine art.

=== Learning Buddhadharma ===
Master Chan-Yun took the refuge in the three jewels and became a Buddhist when he was 24. At the age of 26, he took the five precepts. At 30, he became a monk in Beijing. He therefore received full ordination at the Guangji Temple. Then, he had studied at Chinese Buddhist College in Beijing for four years. In 1948, he went to Fuzhou to learn the Buddha dharma from Venerable Ci-Zou (Chinese: 慈舟法師).

=== Ferry to Taiwan ===
In 1949, Master Chang Yun ferried to Taiwan. In 1956, he built a tentative house for intensive practices, and which was called “Yin-Hong Hut” (Chinese: 印弘茅蓬) at Guan-Yin Mountain in PuLi. Due to a major flood disaster in 1959, he had to abandon the Hut. Consequently, he planned to found the current Lianyin Temple with his disciple Ven. Xing-Yin in 1963.

== Founding the Fast and Precept Association ==
Starting in 1966, Master Chan Yun founded the “Fast and Precept Association” (Chinese: 齋戒協會; pinyin: zhai jie xie hui); its motto is “the vinaya is our guide” (Chinese: 以戒為師; pinyin: yi jie wei shi). Then, he initiated the “Fasting and Precepts Program” at the temple, which offered intensive courses in Buddhism study and precepts practices during summer and winter vacations for college students.

== Vinaya practice and legacy ==
Master Chan Yun disciplined himself strictly, practicing the vinaya, and made it as his daily routine to practice prostrating himself before the Buddha, practicing morning and evening rituals and executing the "Mengshan Food Bestowal ritual" (Chinese: 放蒙山). Master Chang-Yun never violated eight precepts, the precept of no eating after noon, since he became a monk. According to his disciples, his teaching was compared to that of Marpa Lotsawa to Milarepa.

== Nirvana ==
Venerable Master Chang Yun died at one o'clock on the morning of March 7, 2009 at Shuili township, Nantou county, Taiwan.
