= Hsu Hai-ching =

Taiwanese gangster

Hsu Hai-ching (許海清; 1913 – April 6, 2005) was a veteran gangster in Taiwan.
