= Wen Hsing-tsun =

Taiwanese educator and politician

Wen Hsing-tsun (Chinese: 溫興春; 16 November 1926 – 14 July 2012) was a Taiwanese educator and politician who served in the Legislative Yuan from 1987 to 1990.

Born in 1926 to Hakka parents in Japanese-era Taiwan, Wen was raised what became Gaoshu, Pingtung County. He founded and led schools in the counties of Kaohsiung and Pingtung. For his contributions to education in Taiwan, Wen was appointed to the Legislative Yuan in 1987. Upon the end of his term in 1990, Wen became president of Meiho University. He was later named a senior adviser to Presidents Lee Teng-hui and Ma Ying-jeou. He died of pancreatic cancer at his home in Pingtung County in 2012, aged 86.
