= Kao Fong College of Digital Contents =

Former college in Changzhi, Pingtung County, Taiwan

- 高鳳數位內容學院
- Type: private college
- Active: 1 August 2004–March 2014
- Location: Changzhi, Pingtung County, Taiwan
- Website: www.kfcdc.edu.tw at the Wayback Machine (archived 1 February 2014)

Kao Fong College of Digital Contents (KFCDC; traditional Chinese: 高鳳數位內容學院; simplified Chinese: 高凤数位内容学院; pinyin: Gāofèng Shùwèi Nèiróng Xuéyuàn) was a private college in Changzhi Township, Pingtung County, Taiwan.

== History ==
KFCDC was originally established as Kao Fong College on 1 August 2004. In August 2009, the college was renamed Kao Fong College of Digital Contents. In February 2014, the college announced that it would close in March, reportedly due to low enrollment and heavy debt. After the campus closure, the university building will be transformed into elementary and secondary schools in 2016.

== Faculties ==
The college had nine departments: Digital Animation Design, Digital Audio and Video Design, Digital Commerce, Digital Game Design, Digital Media Design, Distribution Management, Leisure and Recreation English, Leisure and Recreation Management, and Techno-Craft Design.
