= 2003 Democratic Progressive Party presidential primary =

- 11 December 2003
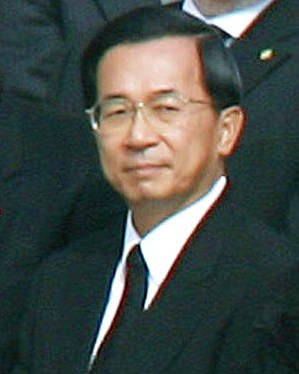
Candidate	Chen Shui-bian
Percentage	100.00%
DPP nominee before election
Chen Shui-bian
Elected DPP nominee
Chen Shui-bian

The 2003 Democratic Progressive Party presidential primary was the selection process by which the Democratic Progressive Party of the Republic of China (Taiwan) chose its candidate for the 2004 presidential election. The DPP candidate for president was not selected because only one person, the incumbent President Chen Shui-bian, wanted to take the ticket.

== Result ==
Candidate	Votes	Percentage
Chen	——	unopposed

== See also ==
- 2004 Republic of China presidential election
