= 1995 in Taiwan =

- Decades: 1970s; 1980s; 1990s; 2000s; 2010s
- See also: Other events of 1995; History of Taiwan • Timeline • Years

Events from the year 1995 in Taiwan. This year is numbered Minguo 84 according to the official Republic of China calendar.

== Incumbents ==
- President – Lee Teng-hui
- Vice President – Li Yuan-tsu
- Premier – Lien Chan
- Vice Premier – Hsu Li-teh

== Events ==
=== February ===
- 14 February – The launch of KISS Radio.
- 15 February – The Weierkang Club fire killed 64, and injured 11 people
- 28 February – President Lee Teng-hui publicly addressed the public to discuss the February 28 Incident, the first statement made by the ROC head of state about the incident since 1947.

=== March ===
- 1 March – The establishment of National Fire Agency of the Ministry of the Interior.
- 28 March – The start of Muzha Refuse Incineration Plant commercial operation in Wenshan District, Taipei.

=== April ===
- 9 April
  - The opening of Sanyi Wood Sculpture Museum in Sanyi Township, Miaoli County.
  - The opening of Li Mei-shu Memorial Gallery in Sanxia Township, Taipei County.

=== June ===
- 29 June – The establishment of Children Are Us Foundation.

=== July ===
- 1 July – The establishment of National Kaohsiung Hospitality Management Academy in Siaogang District, Kaohsiung City.
- 20 July – The establishment of Public Construction Commission.
- 21 July – The start of Third Taiwan Strait Crisis.

=== October ===
- 18 October – The establishment of Kinmen National Park in Kinmen County.
- 30 October – The establishment of Architecture and Building Research Institute of the Ministry of the Interior.

=== December ===
- 2 December – The 1995 Republic of China legislative election.
- 20 December – The renaming of Central Police College to Central Police University.

== Births ==
- 7 January – Fan Jung-yu, badminton player
- 15 January – Darren Chen, actor
- 22 June – Chen Chao-an, football player
- 21 November – Liu Sheng-yi, football player

== Deaths ==
- 14 January – Huang Chieh, 92, general and government official, Chairman of the Taiwan Provincial Government (1962–1969), Minister of National Defense (1969–1972).
- 9 March – Kuo Shui-t'an, 87, Saline Land writer.
- 6 May – Yang San-lang, 87, painter.
- 8 May – Teresa Teng, 42, singer and musician (asthma attack or heart failure in Thailand).
- 16 June – Zhang Xuezhong, 95, general.
- 26 June – Qiu Miaojin, 26, novelist of lesbian literature (committed suicide in France).
- 7 July – Lee Shih-chiao, 86, painter.
