= 1999 in Taiwan =

- Decades: 1970s; 1980s; 1990s; 2000s; 2010s
- See also: Other events of 1999; History of Taiwan • Timeline • Years

Events from the year 1999 in Taiwan. This year is numbered Minguo 88 according to the official Republic of China calendar.

== Incumbents ==
- President – Lee Teng-hui
- Vice President – Lien Chan
- Premier – Vincent Siew
- Vice Premier – Liu Chao-shiuan

== Events ==
=== April ===
- 15 April – 2000 Democratic Progressive Party presidential primary.
- 20–25 April – 1999 Asian Youth Boys Volleyball Championship in Chiayi City.

=== May ===
- 8–9 May – Resolution on Taiwan's Future was ratified by Democratic Progressive Party in Kaohsiung.

=== June ===
- 10 June – The establishment of Miaoli Railway Museum in Miaoli City, Miaoli County.

=== July ===
- 1 July – The establishment of Centers for Disease Control.
- 8 July – The 'special state-to-state' model for cross-strait relations proposed by President Lee Teng-hui.

=== August ===
- 24 August – The explosion of Uni Air Flight 873 after it landed at Hualien Airport.

=== September ===
- 10 September – The signing of A New Partnership Between the Indigenous Peoples and the Government of Taiwan in Taitung County.
- 21 September – The 7.6 M_{w} Jiji earthquake occurred in Nantou County.

=== October ===
- 25 October – The opening of Hong-gah Museum in Beitou District, Taipei.

=== November ===
- 11 November – The opening of Xindian Line of Taipei Metro.

=== December ===
- 12 December – 36th Golden Horse Awards in Taipei.
- 24 December – The opening of Nangang Line of Taipei Metro.

== Births ==
- 2 April – Hsu Yu-hsiou, tennis player
- 14 June – Chou Tzu-yu, singer

== Deaths ==
- 30 November – Huang Hsin-chieh, 71, Taiwanese politician, MLY (1969–1991), heart attack.
- 28 December – Wei Ting-chao, 65, Taiwanese democracy activist.
