= 1998 in Taiwan =

- Decades: 1970s; 1980s; 1990s; 2000s; 2010s
- See also: Other events of 1998; History of Taiwan • Timeline • Years

Events from the year 1998 in Taiwan. This year is numbered Minguo 87 according to the official Republic of China calendar.

== Incumbents ==
- President – Lee Teng-hui
- Vice President – Lien Chan
- Premier – Vincent Siew
- Vice Premier – Liu Chao-shiuan

== Events ==
=== January ===
- 1 January – The opening of Hsinchu Air Base in Hsinchu City.
- 12 January – The renaming of Sports Council to Sports Affairs Council.

=== February ===
- 16 February – The crash of China Airlines Flight 676 in Taoyuan County (now Taoyuan City).
- 21 February – The opening of Museum of Medical Humanities in Taipei.

=== April ===
- 28 April – The debut of My Fair Princess.

=== June ===
- 16 June – The establishment of Hsin Tao Power Corporation.

=== July ===
- 1 July – The establishment of Public Television Service.

=== August ===
- 1 August – The establishment of Fisheries Agency of the Council of Agriculture.

=== October ===
- 25 October – The opening of Kaohsiung Museum of History in Kaohsiung City.
- 31 October – The opening of Beitou Hot Spring Museum in Taipei.

=== December ===
- 5 December – The 1998 Republic of China legislative election.
- 21 December – The ownership of Land Bank of Taiwan was handed over from Taiwan Provincial Government to Executive Yuan.
- 24 December – The opening of Zhonghe Line of Taipei Metro.

== Births ==
- 10 February – Candy Hsu, singer and actress.
- 4 June – Hu Ling-fang, badminton player.
- 24 December – Shen Yan-ru, badminton player.

== Deaths ==
- 14 June – Chu Fu-sung, Minister of Foreign Affairs (1979–1987).
