= Disability in Taiwan =

As of 2007, there are almost one million people with various levels of physical and mental disabilities in Taiwan. Taiwan adopted a universal healthcare system in 1995 to properly support patient care and provide more transparent access to its people, including those who identify as disabled. Taiwan is a nation that has grown tremendously to support those that are disabled. This includes having a socialized form of medical care that is run by the Executive Yuan. Overall this universal scheme includes the law, public facilities, and educational aspect of healthcare. Taiwan also has different aspects of healthcare to effectively support those that are disadvantaged or disabled, this included subsidies, loans, plans, service guarantee and specific care for medically vulnerable populations. Taiwan's healthcare development and dedication to support its people plays an important role in its transformation of benefits for disabled people.

== History ==
Prior to the 1980s, the term referring to people with disabilities translated to "useless and worthless disability". The government was not responsible for providing supporting or funding those with disabilities. Families and non-profit, private organizations were responsible for supporting disabled people. However, institutions were not regulated, as some were inhumane and the quality of service, questionable. However, as Taiwan underwent industrialization, mothers were forced to enter the work force and could no longer support their children with disabilities. The once-questionable facilities were forced to reform and become suitable for taking care children with disabilities. In addition, in 1975, the United Nations released the "Declaration of the Rights of Disabled Persons" which forced the government to reform their original disability policy. Taiwanese disability policies became heavily influenced by international disability laws and regulations. From the first disability policy reform to 2007, a medical model became the standard for disability evaluation.

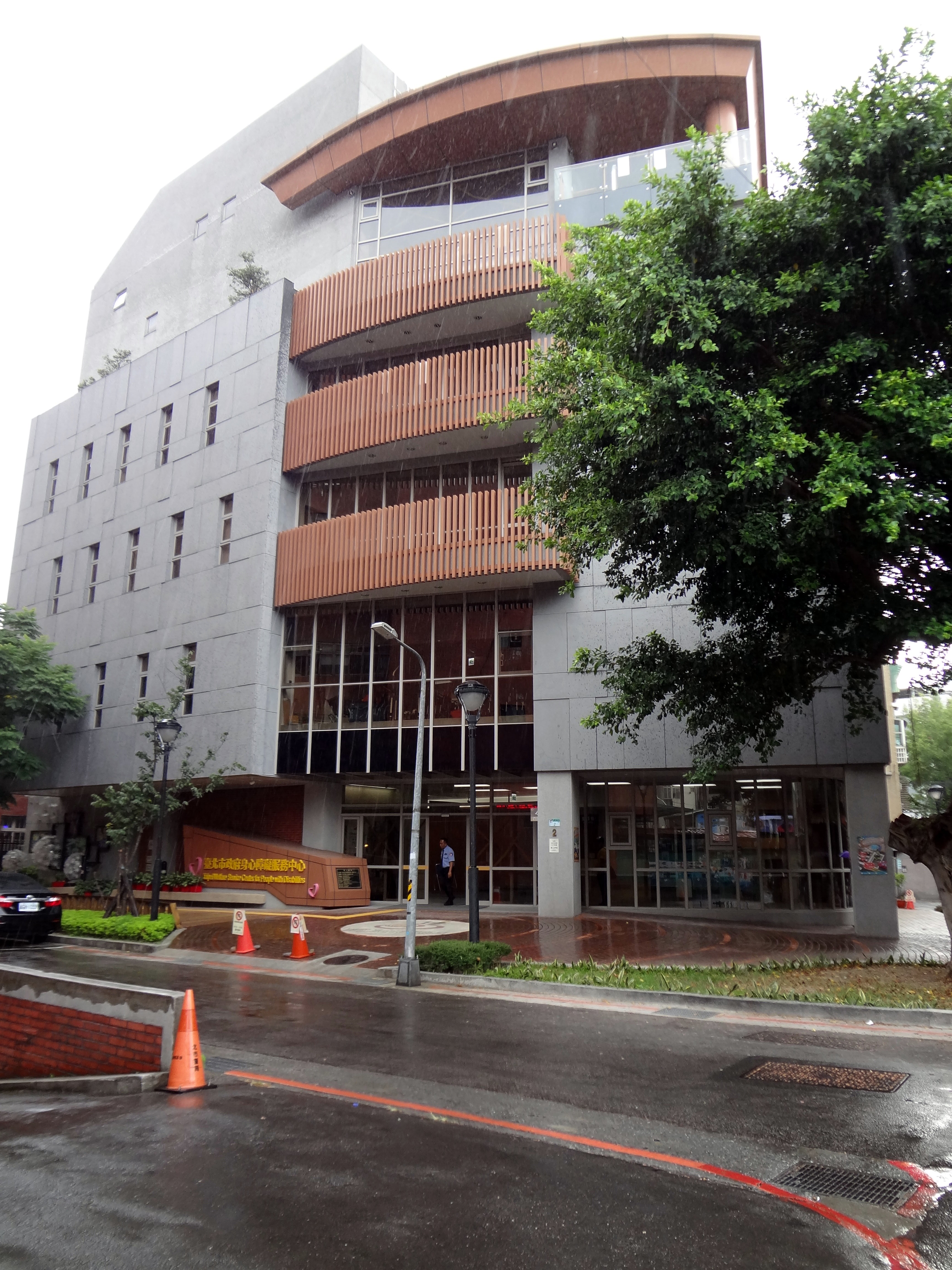
Taipei Welfare Service Center for People with Disabilities in Taipei.

== Law ==
In 1980, the Taiwanese Welfare Law for the Handicapped and Disabled was enacted which listed all types off disabilities disabled. In 2006, Taiwan adopted the Convention on the Rights of Persons with Disabilities to upholds its human rights protection for people with disabilities. Disabilities Rights Protection Act was enacted in July 2007. Taiwan Accessibility Building Code was amended in 2008 for buildings to provide more access for disabled people. Public Officials Election and Recall Law was amended on 26 November 2008 to ensure any polling place is barrier-free venue or equipped with tools or additional facilities if such venue does not exist.

=== Benefits ===
Disabled people in Taiwan (excluding disabled people with foreign nationality) are entitled to receive subsidies, benefits, house value-added tax rebate and income tax rebate depending on their level of disability.

=== Employment ===
Any employer shall not discriminate against any disabled candidates or refusing employment due to their disability. Private companies must employ at least one person with disability for every 67 person employed. As of September 1998, Lienchiang County has the best performance of meeting this employment quota among all municipalities, cities or counties in Taiwan. Unemployment among disabled people in Taiwan is 14.7%, triple of the amount of those general population which is 4.99%.

== Public facilities ==
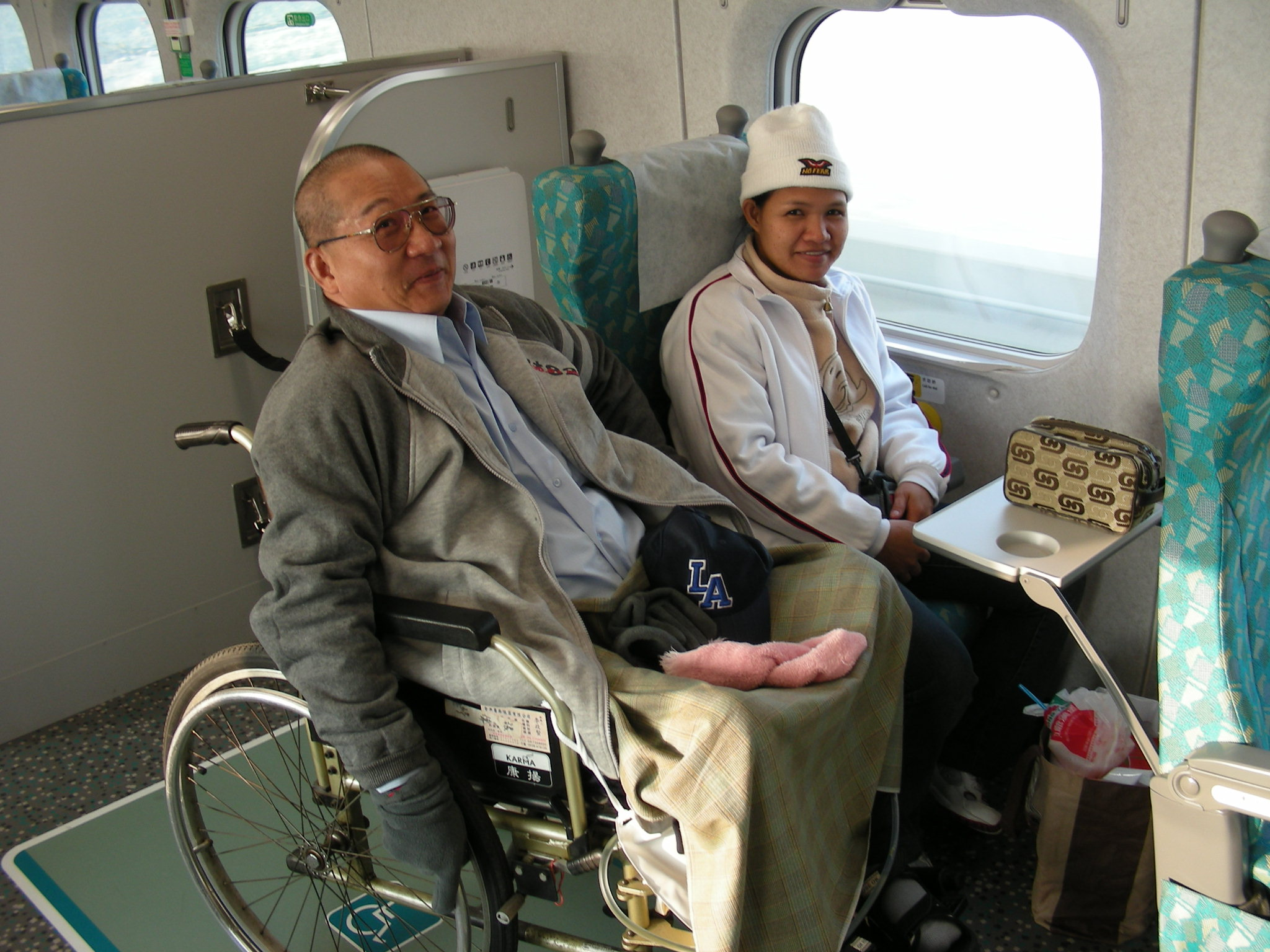
Disabled-friendly seat at Taiwan High Speed Rail coach.

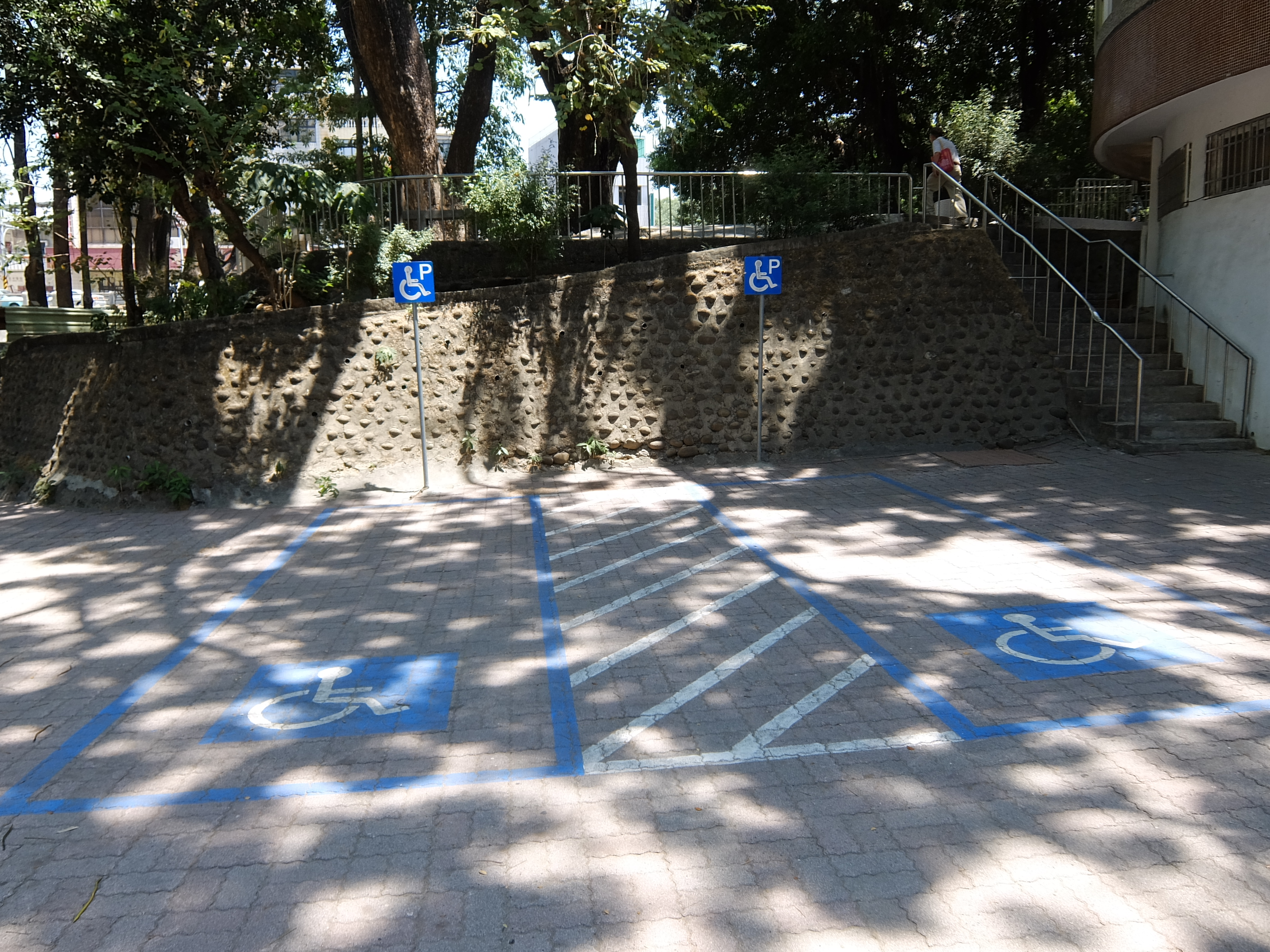
Disabled-only parking lot at Tainan Children's Science Museum in Tainan.

=== Transportation ===
==== Air ====
Airports provide personnel to assist disabled people free of charge throughout the entire journey from check-in until baggage reclaim.

==== Rail ====
All of the metro, subway and high speed rail in Taiwan are equipped with accessibility for disabled people.

==== Road ====
New public buses in Taipei are equipped with wheelchair access and designated areas. Most of traffic lights are equipped with audible signal for visually impaired people.

=== Elections ===
Polling places are fitted with barrier-free access. In the event of unavailability of such facility, then relevant tool are used to help disabled people cast their ballots.

== Education ==
According to the Population of People with Disability Report, 107,450 elementary and middle school students or 3% of the total number of elementary and middle school students are students with disabilities. After the adoption of the Functioning Scale of the Disability Evaluation System---Child Version (FUNDES-Child) in 2007, the focus on child disability shifted. FUNDES-CHILD was developed with the intention of locating children in the nation for the introduction of a new service policy developed according to the framework of the International Classification of Functioning, Disability and Health: Children and Youth Version. The definition of disability was refined to include more than health and body impairment related disabilities. In a study to identify the children and the gap between independence and frequency, in which independence means the capability of a child or what they "can do" which the frequency pertains to the extent to which they can carry out a task or what a child "does do", the children with mild severity in Taiwan showed more frequency restrictions. In another study, children with intellectual disability showed more signs of "aggression, self-injurious behavior or physical complaints" but not signs of "depression and anxiety complaints."

=== Policies ===
There are separate policies for children and adults. One of the policies for students with disabilities is the Taiwan Special Education Act of 2013 to provide special education laws. Before the Taiwan Special Education Act of 2013, there was The First Children's Development Center founded in 1981 for students with intellectual disabilities. However, there are no regulations for children under the age of 2, as regulations only allow school age students to utilize special education services. Educational institutions are required to accommodate and meet the needs of all students, providing the necessary accommodations, assistive technology and accessible campus. Another policy that pertains to children with disabilities is the Taiwan People with Disabilities Rights Protection Act of 2013. Children are protected from anti-discrimination statute. Through the increased human-rights advocacy and the civil rights movement for disabilities, Taiwan has been improving disability rights by creating more inclusive communities and increasing opportunities for students with disabilities.

=== Schools ===
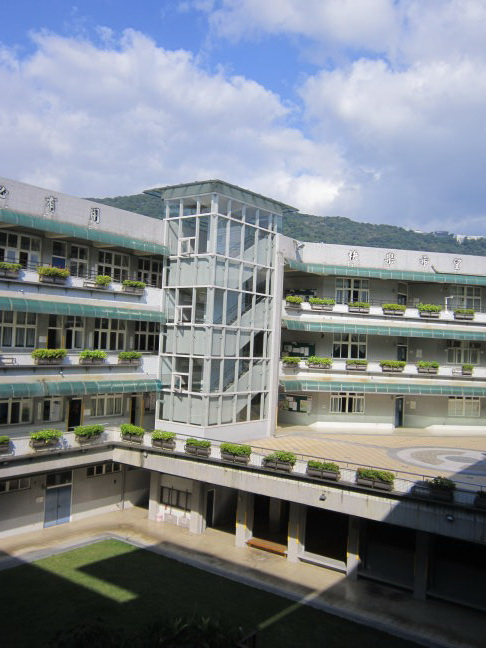
Taipei School for the Visually Impaired in Shilin, Taipei

There are 20 special schools in Taiwan dedicated for students who are blind, deaf, physically disabled, or intellectually disabled. Students are either take bus or live within the school compounds. Those with severe disabilities, visiting teachers will visit them to hospitals or homes.

=== Budget ===
As of 1999, budget for special education by the Ministry of Education is NT$3.58 billion. The ministry also subsidizes private charity organizations that help disabled people.

== Organizations ==
Non-profit organizations in Taiwan that promotes the awareness and help for disabled people are:

- Children Are Us Foundation
- Taiwan Access for All Association
- United Way of Taiwan, founded in 1990

== See also ==
- Deafness in Taiwan
- Healthcare in Taiwan
