= 2001 in Taiwan =

- Decades: 1980s; 1990s; 2000s; 2010s; 2020s
- See also: Other events of 2001; History of Taiwan • Timeline • Years

Events from the year 2001 in Taiwan. This year is numbered Minguo 90 according to the official Republic of China calendar.

== Incumbents ==
- President – Chen Shui-bian
- Vice President – Annette Lu
- Premier – Chang Chun-hsiung
- Vice Premier – Lai In-jaw

== Events ==
=== January ===
- 14 January – The start of Amorgos oil spill offshore Pingtung County.

=== February ===
- 13 February – The opening of 921 Earthquake Museum of Taiwan in Wufeng Township, Taichung County.
- 16 February – The start of operation of Hsinchu City EPB Incinerator Plant in North District, Hsinchu City.

=== March ===
- 24 March – 2001 Kuomintang chairmanship election
- 26 March – The establishment of Cross-Straits Common Market Foundation in Taipei.

=== April ===
- 6 April – The debut of Asia Market Week.
- 12 April – The debut of Meteor Garden.
- 27 April – Hualien Airport was certified for international flights.
- 28 April – The opening of Meinong Hakka Culture Museum in Kaohsiung County.

=== May ===
- 3 May – The debut of Romance in the Rain.
- 5 May – The 12th Golden Melody Awards in Kaohsiung.
- 27 May – The opening of Museum of Contemporary Art Taipei in Taipei.

=== June ===
- 12 June – The founding of Himax.
- 14 June – The establishment of Council for Hakka Affairs of the Executive Yuan.

=== July ===
- 24 July – The founding of Taiwan Solidarity Union.

=== August ===
- 11 August – The debut of Poor Prince.
- 12 August – The opening of Yuanlin Performance Hall in Yuanlin City, Changhua County.

=== September ===
- 5 September – The formation of Typhoon Nari.
- 11 September
  - The launching of Azio TV.
  - The launching of the first album of S.H.E.

=== October ===
- 11 October – The promulgation of the Petroleum Administration Act.
- 16 October – The reopening of Institute of Yilan County History at its current place.
- 26 October – The opening of Breeze Center in Taipei.

=== December ===
- 1 December
  - 2001 Republic of China legislative election.
  - 2001 Republic of China local elections.
- 6 December – The debut of Lavender.
- 10 December – The debut of The New Adventures of Chor Lau-heung.

== Births ==
- 23 September – Lai Kuan-lin, singer and actor
- 6 October – Cindy Chi, actress
