= 2002 in Taiwan =

- Decades: 1980s; 1990s; 2000s; 2010s; 2020s
- See also: Other events of 2002; History of Taiwan • Timeline • Years

Events from the year 2002 in Taiwan. This year is numbered Minguo 91 according to the official Republic of China calendar.

== Incumbents ==
- President – Chen Shui-bian
- Vice President – Annette Lu
- Premier – Chang Chun-hsiung, Yu Shyi-kun
- Vice Premier – Lai In-jaw, Lin Hsin-i

== Events ==
=== March ===
- 1 March – The establishment of Armaments Bureau.
- 25 March – The renaming of Council of Aboriginal Affairs to the Council of Indigenous Peoples.
- 29 March – The opening of Chien Mu House in Shilin District, Taipei.

=== May ===
- 22 May – The release of Tomorrow's original soundtrack.
- 25 May – China Airlines Flight 611 crashed into the Taiwan Strait, killing everybody on board.

=== June ===
- 28 June – Typhoon Rammasun formed in the pacific island, affecting countries such as Taiwan, Japan, and the Philippines.

=== August ===
- 1 August – The upgrade of Fooyin Institute of Technology in Kaohsiung to Fooyin University.
- 17 August – The opening of National Museum of Prehistory in Taitung City, Taitung County.

=== September ===
- 1 September – The upgrade of Ming Hsin Institute of Technology in Xinfeng Township, Hsinchu County to Minghsin University of Science and Technology.

=== October ===
- 4 October – The opening of Daqiao Station in Yongkang City, Tainan County.

=== November ===
- 10 November – The opening of Taipei Film House in Zhongzheng District, Taipei.

=== December ===
- 7 December – 2002 Republic of China municipal election.
- 28 December – The opening of Hsinchu Museum of Military Dependents Village in North District, Hsinchu City.
- 31 December – The establishment of Mega International Commercial Bank after the merging of International Commercial Bank of China and Chiao T’ung Bank.

== Deaths ==
- 2 May – Sihung Lung, 72, Chinese-born Taiwanese actor.
- 6 September – David Yen, Taiwanese activist (John Tung Foundation).
- 13 October – Hsieh Chun-hui, 63, Taiwanese politician, MLY (2002).
