= 2000 in Taiwan =

- Decades: 1980s; 1990s; 2000s; 2010s; 2020s
- See also: Other events of 2000; History of Taiwan • Timeline • Years

Events from the year 2000 in Taiwan. This year is numbered Minguo 89 according to the official Republic of China calendar.

== Incumbents ==
- President – Lee Teng-hui, Chen Shui-bian
- Vice President – Lien Chan, Annette Lu
- Premier – Vincent Siew, Tang Fei
- Vice Premier – Liu Chao-shiuan, Yu Shyi-kun

== Events ==
=== February ===
- 1 February
  - The establishment of Coast Guard Administration.
  - The establishment of National University of Kaohsiung in Nanzih District, Kaohsiung City.
- 25 February – The establishment of National Museum of Marine Biology and Aquarium in Checheng Township, Pingtung County.

=== March ===
- 18 March – 2000 Republic of China presidential election.
- 29 March – The opening of Taipei City Mall in Taipei.
- 31 March – The establishment of People First Party.

=== April ===
- 28 April – 11th Golden Melody Awards at Sun Yat-sen Memorial Hall in Xinyi District, Taipei City.

=== May ===
- 20 May
  - Chen Shui-bian took office as President of the Republic of China.
  - Annette Lu took office as Vice President of the Republic of China.
  - Tang Fei took office as Premier of the Republic of China.
  - Yu Shyi-kun took office as Vice Premier of the Republic of China.
- 21 May – The opening of Image Museum of Hsinchu City in East District, Hsinchu City.

=== July ===
- 15 July – The first Hohaiyan Rock Festival held in Gongliao Township, Taipei County.

=== August ===
- 1 August
  - The opening of National Linkou High School in Linkou Township, Taipei County.
  - The upgrade of Shu-Te Institute of Technology in Yanchao Township, Kaohsiung County to Shu-Te University.
  - The upgrade of National Kaohsiung Hospitality Management Academy in Siaogang District, Kaohsiung City to National Kaohsiung Hospitality Management Academy.
- 18–27 August – Typhoon Bilis.
- 31 August – The opening of Xiaonanmen Line of Taipei Metro.

=== November ===
- 26 November – The opening of Taipei County Yingko Ceramics Museum in Taipei County.

== Births ==
- 21 February – Cho I-hsuan, tennis player
