= 1996 in Taiwan =

- Decades: 1970s; 1980s; 1990s; 2000s; 2010s
- See also: Other events of 1996; History of Taiwan • Timeline • Years

Events from the year 1996 in Taiwan. This year is numbered Minguo 85 according to the official Republic of China calendar.

== Incumbents ==
- President – Lee Teng-hui
- Vice President – Li Yuan-tsu, Lien Chan
- Premier – Lien Chan
- Vice Premier – Hsu Li-teh

== Events ==
=== January ===
- 1 January – The inauguration of the new Penghu Great Bridge in Penghu County.
- 15 January – The restoration of Fujian Provincial Government from Xindian City, Taipei County to Jincheng Township, Kinmen County.
- 22 January – The renaming of Training Center for Government Officials to Civil Service Development Institute.

=== March ===
- 21 March – The renaming of Chieh-shou Road to Ketagalan Boulevard by Taipei Mayor Chen Shui-bian.
- 23 March
  - The end of Third Taiwan Strait Crisis.
  - 1996 Republic of China National Assembly election.
  - 1996 Republic of China presidential election.
- 27 March – The establishment of Formosa Television.
- 28 March – The opening of Wenshan Line of Taipei Metro.

=== April ===
- 19 April – The establishment of Chiahui Power Corporation.

=== May ===
- 5 May – The establishment of Tong-Kwang Light House Presbyterian Church in Taipei.

=== July ===
- 4 July – Construction groundbreaking for Xinzhuang Baseball Stadium in Xinzhuang City, Taipei County.

=== November ===
- 7 November – The opening of Taipei Astronomical Museum in Shilin District, Taipei City.

=== December ===
- 1 December – The establishment of the Council of Aboriginal Affairs.
- 13 December – The Compulsory Automobile Liability Insurance Act passes the Legislative Yuan.
- 15 December – The opening of the Representative Office in Taipei for the Moscow-Taipei Coordination Commission on Economic and Cultural Cooperation in Taipei.

== Births ==
- 24 February – Lin Wan-ting, taekwondo athlete
- 2 August – Edward Chen, actor and singer
- 19 August – Hsu Ching-wen, tennis player
- 24 October – Ian Yi, actor
- 21 December – Ma Chia-ling, singer

== Deaths ==
- 24 February – Winston Chang, 53, legal scholar, disputed illegitimate son of Chiang Ching-kuo.
- 24 February – Ding Delong, 91, general.
- 13 March – Hsu Ching-chung, 88, Vice Premier (1972–1981).
- 24 June – Wang Renyuan, 85, politician, Minister of Justice (1960–1976).
- 16 October – Huang Shao-ku, 95, Vice Premier (1954–1958, 1966–1969), President of the Judicial Yuan (1979–1987).
- 22 December Chiang Hsiao-yung, 48, politician, son of Chiang Ching-kuo.
