= 1997 in Taiwan =

- Decades: 1970s; 1980s; 1990s; 2000s; 2010s
- See also: Other events of 1997; History of Taiwan • Timeline • Years

Events from the year 1997 in Taiwan. This year is numbered Minguo 86 according to the official Republic of China calendar.

== Incumbents ==
- President – Lee Teng-hui
- Vice President – Lien Chan
- Premier – Lien Chan, Vincent Siew
- Vice Premier – Hsu Li-teh, John Chiang, Liu Chao-shiuan

== Events ==
=== March ===
- 28 March
  - The opening of Miniatures Museum of Taiwan in Zhongshan District, Taipei.
  - The opening of Tamsui Line and Xinbeitou Branch Line of Taipei Metro.

=== April ===
- 20 April – Murder of Pai Hsiao-yen in Taipei County.

=== June ===
- 11 June
  - The establishment of FTV News.
  - The first broadcast of Formosa Television.

=== October ===
- 19 October – The opening of Xinzhuang Baseball Stadium in Xinzhuang City, Taipei County.

=== December ===
- 13 December – The opening of Memorial Hall of Founding of Yilan Administration in Yilan City, Yilan County.

== Births ==
- 26 June – Kent Tsai, actor
- 19 December – Chen Su-yu, badminton player
- 30 December – Tseng Jing-hua, actor
