= Hsintao Power Plant =

Power plant in Guangxi, Hsinchu County, Taiwan

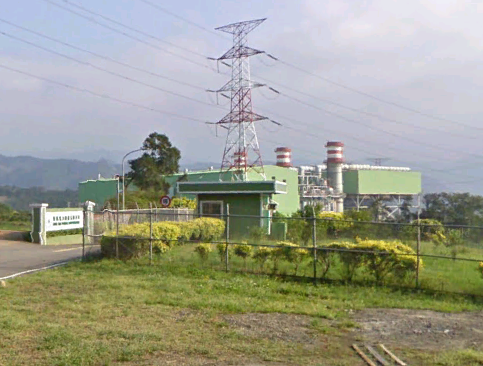
- Official name: 新桃電廠
- Country: Republic of China
- Location: Guangxi, Hsinchu County, Taiwan
- Coordinates: 24°48′51.1″N 121°11′52.3″E
- Status: Operational
- Commission date: March 2002
- Owner: Hsin Tao Power Corporation
- Operator: Hsin Tao Power Corporation

Thermal power station
- Primary fuel: Natural gas

Power generation
- Units operational: 4
- Nameplate capacity: 600 MW

External links
- Commons: Related media on Commons

The Hsintao Power Plant (traditional Chinese: 新桃電廠; simplified Chinese: 新桃电厂; pinyin: Xīntáo Diànchǎng) is a gas-fired power plant in Guangxi Township, Hsinchu County, Taiwan.

== History ==
The development of the power plant started after the second Independent power producer bidding held by Taiwan Power Company in 1995. The plant was commissioned on 1 March 2002. In November 2010, Kyushu Electric Power acquired 33.2% shares of the power plant.

== Fuel ==
The natural gas fuel supply for the power plant is supplied by CPC Corporation.

== See also ==
- List of power stations in Taiwan
- Electricity sector in Taiwan
