= Guanxi, Hsinchu =

Urban township of Hsinchu County, Taiwan

Coordinates: 24°48′N 121°11′E

Guanxi Township 關西鎮 Guansi, Kuanhsi
- Urban township
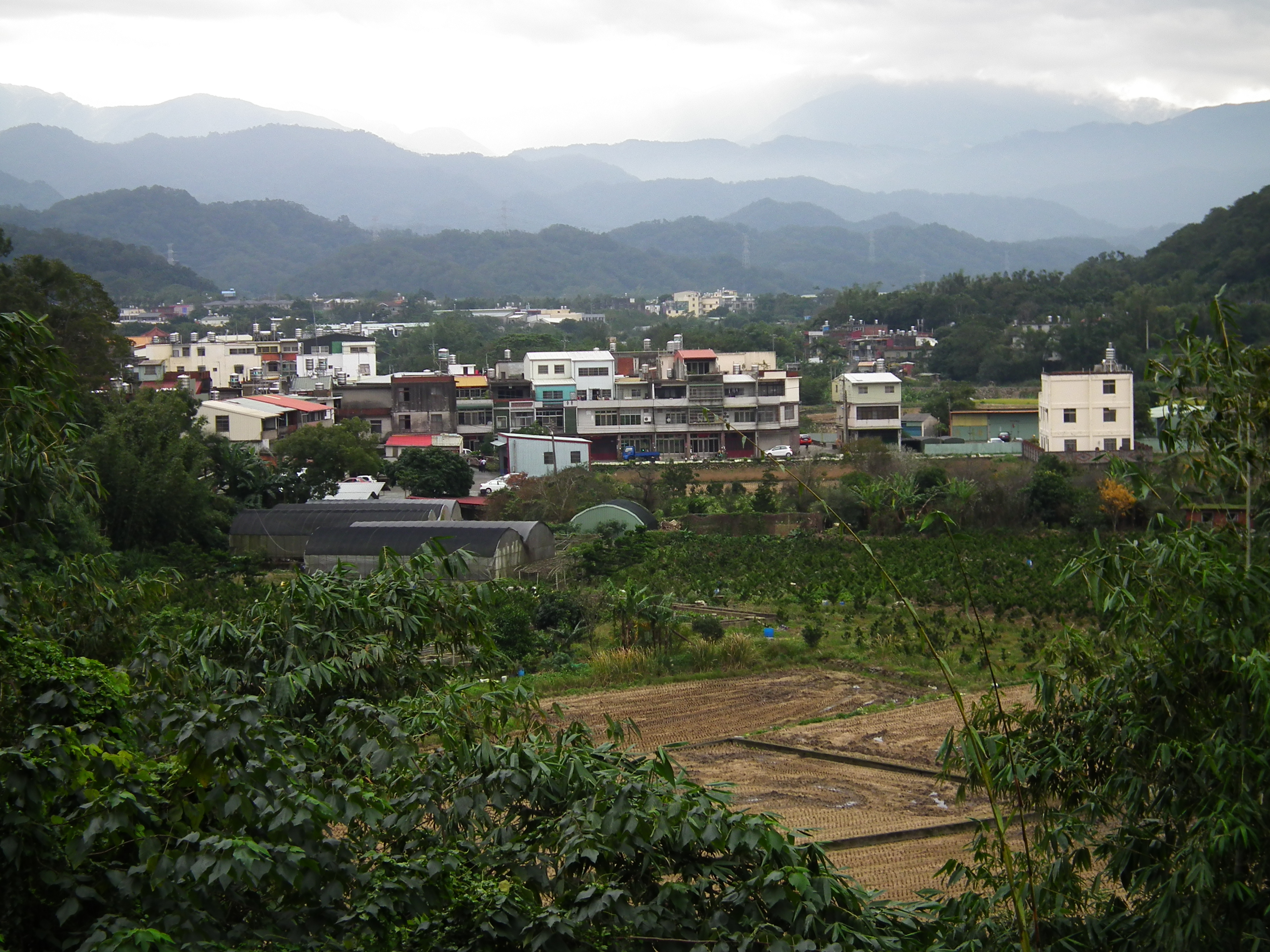

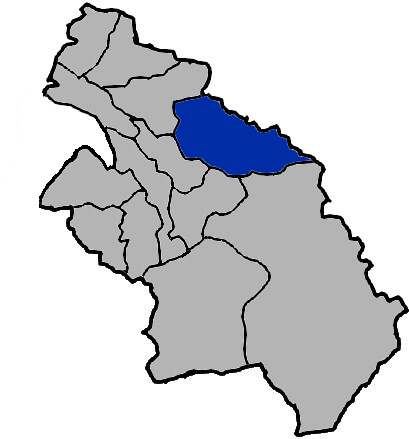
- Guanxi Township in Hsinchu County
- Location: Hsinchu County, Taiwan

Area
  - Total: 126 km^{2} (49 sq mi)

Population (February 2023)
  - Total: 27,051
  - Density: 215/km^{2} (556/sq mi)
- Website: guanxi.hsinchu.gov.tw (in Chinese)

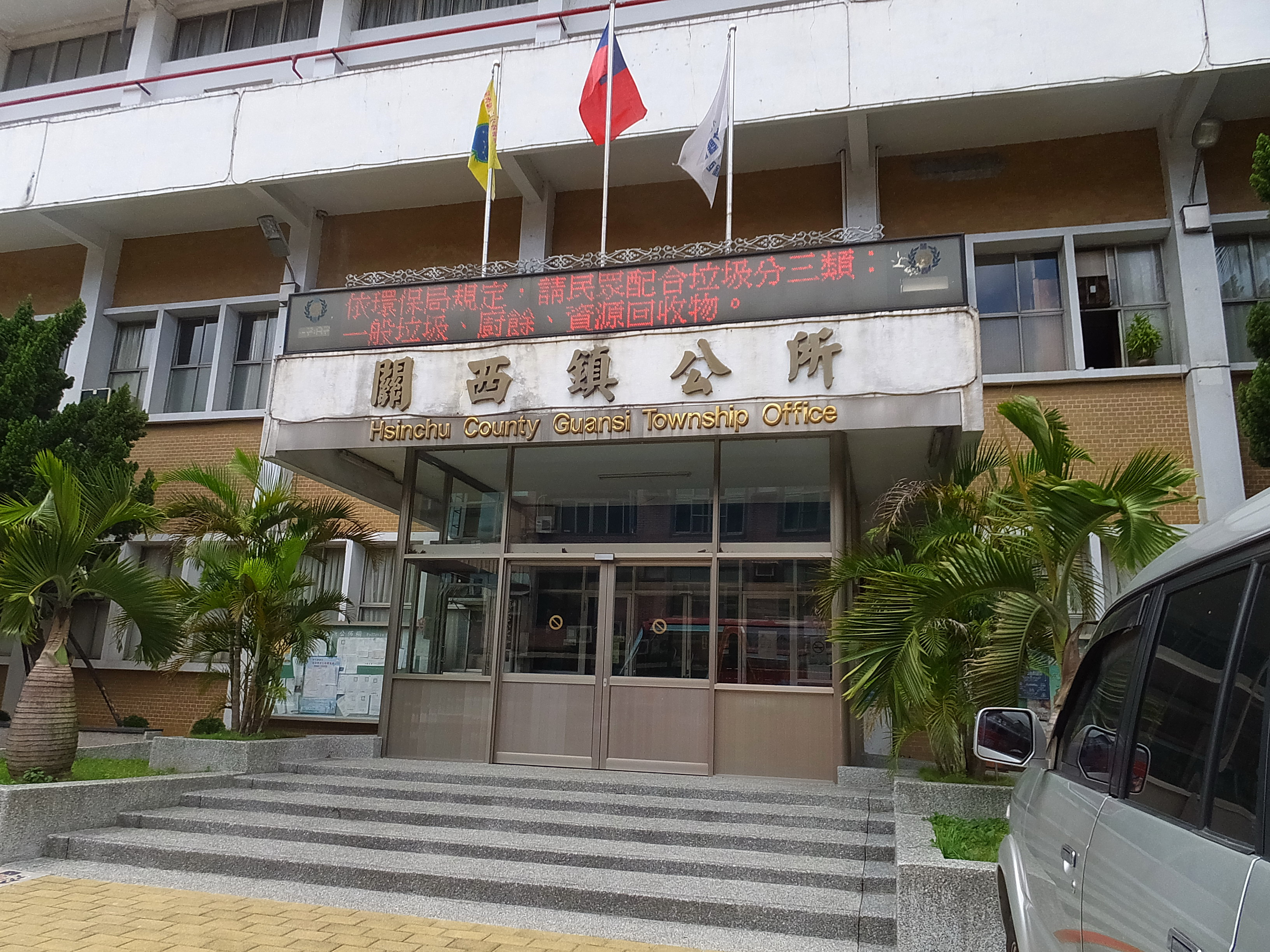
Guanxi Township Office

Guanxi Township or Guansi Township (Chinese: 關西鎮; pinyin: Guānxi Zhèn) is an urban township in Hsinchu County, Taiwan. The population of the township consists mainly of the Hakkas with a minority of the indigenous Atayal people.

== History ==
Guanxi was first settled in the late-18th century as Meili Village (美里莊). Meili Village then changed its name to Xinxing Village (新興莊) after development rights changed hands. In 1850, Xinxing Village was again renamed to Xiancaiweng or Kiâm-chhài-àng (鹹菜甕), literally "pickle urn", for several reasons: First, the local Hakka population was skilled at making Chinese pickled vegetables, and second, the town was geographically located at the confluence of two rivers, making the terrain shaped like an urn.

The name Kiâm-chhài-àng carried over to Japanese rule. Since Kiâm-chhài sounded similar to Kansai in Japanese, the Japanese renamed the town once again to Kansai (関西). After Japan's defeat in the Second World War in 1945, Kansai was sinicized Guanxi by the Republic of China government, which is the current name used today.

== Geography ==
It had an area of 125.5 square kilometres (48.5 sq mi) and an estimated population of 27,051 as of February 2023.

== Administrative divisions ==
Tungxing, Xian, Nanxiong, Beidou, Beishan, Renan, Nanshan, Tungan, Tungshan, Tungguang, Nanxin, Xinfu, Yushan, Jinshan, Jinshan, Datong, Shiguang, Tungping, Shanglin, Xinli and Nanhe Village.

== Economy ==
The township is known for its production of grass jelly.

== Infrastructure ==
- Hsintao Power Plant is operated by Hsin Tao Power Corporation

== Tourist attractions ==
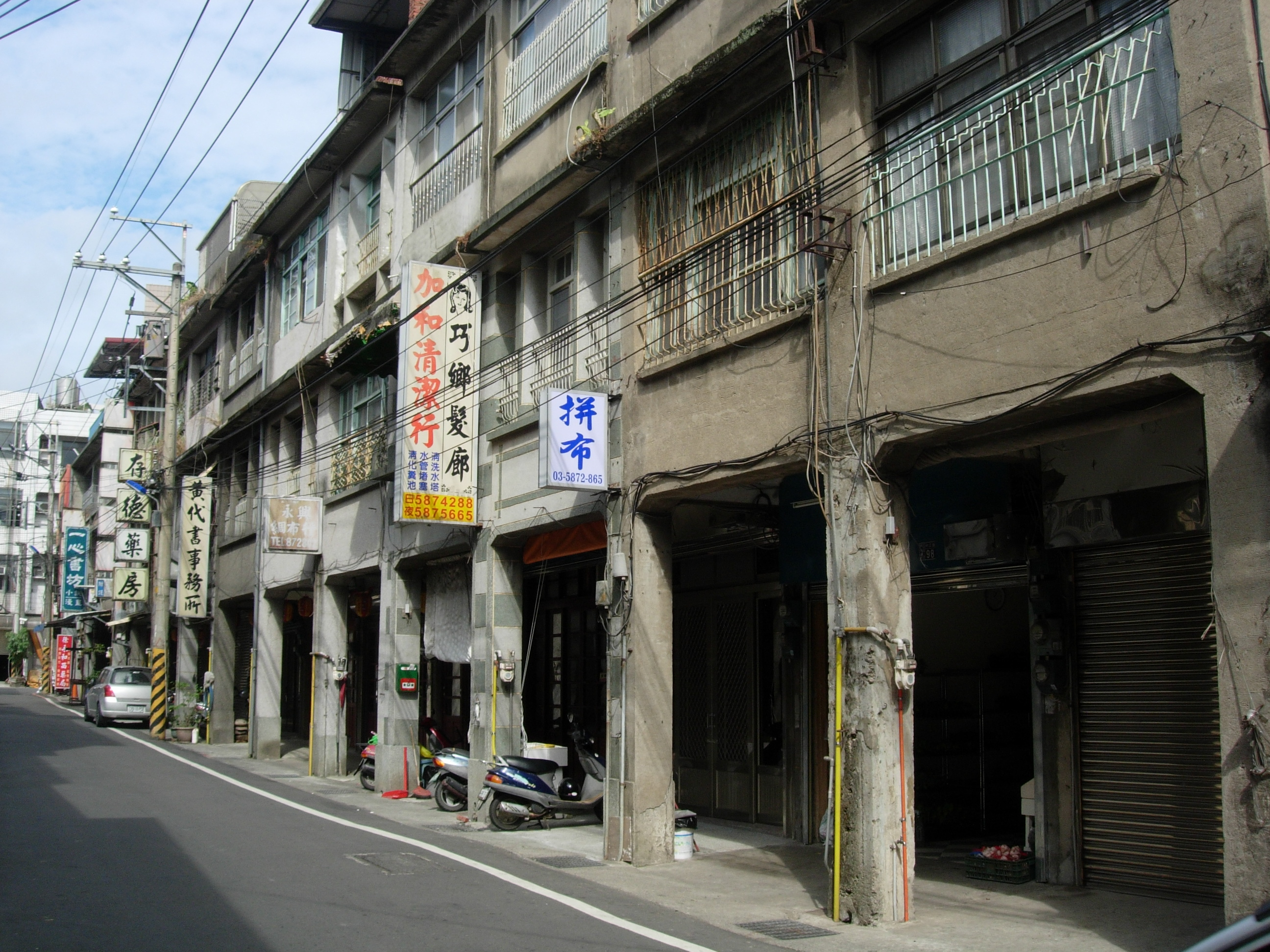
The Old Town of Guanxi

- Leofoo Village Theme Park
- Mawudo Exploration Forest
- Taihe Temple
- Dong'an Bridge
- Chaoyin Temple
- Guanxi Catholic Church
- Formosa Black Tea Company
- Lo House
- Niou Lan River Waterfront Park
- Guanxi Old Police Station

== Transportation ==
Guanxi Bus Station is served by Hsinchu Bus. The township is connected to National freeway 3 via the Guanxi Interchange.

== Notable people ==
- Chen Ying-git, singer
