= Asia Market Week =

2001 Singaporean business news programme

- Genre: Business news program
- Presented by: Various anchors
- Country of origin: Singapore
- Original language: English

Production
- Running time: 30 minutes

Original release
- Network: CNBC Asia
- Release: 6 April 2001 – present

Asia Market Week is a weekly business news programme on CNBC Asia, airing on Fridays at 18:00 Hong Kong / Singapore / Taiwan time with daylight saving time. It also airs on CNBC World and CNBC Europe at various times during the week.

The programme is presented by Maura Forgarty and consists of highlights of the business news in Asia during the previous week. It runs for thirty minutes. The theme music on the programme is that which was used by Today's Business on CNBC US between 2000–2002.

The programme takes its name from the now defunct CNBC US program Market Week with Maria Bartiromo. Internationally, the equivalent programme on CNBC Europe is Europe This Week, a previous incarnation of which was called European Market Week.

== Asia Market Week anchors ==
- Martin Soong (April 6, 2001 – 2003)
- Maura Fogarty (2004–2010)
- Chloe Cho (1–Present)
