= Leofoo Village Theme Park =

Amusement park in Guanxi, Hsinchu County, Taiwan

- Previously known as Leofoo Wildlife Park (1979-1989)

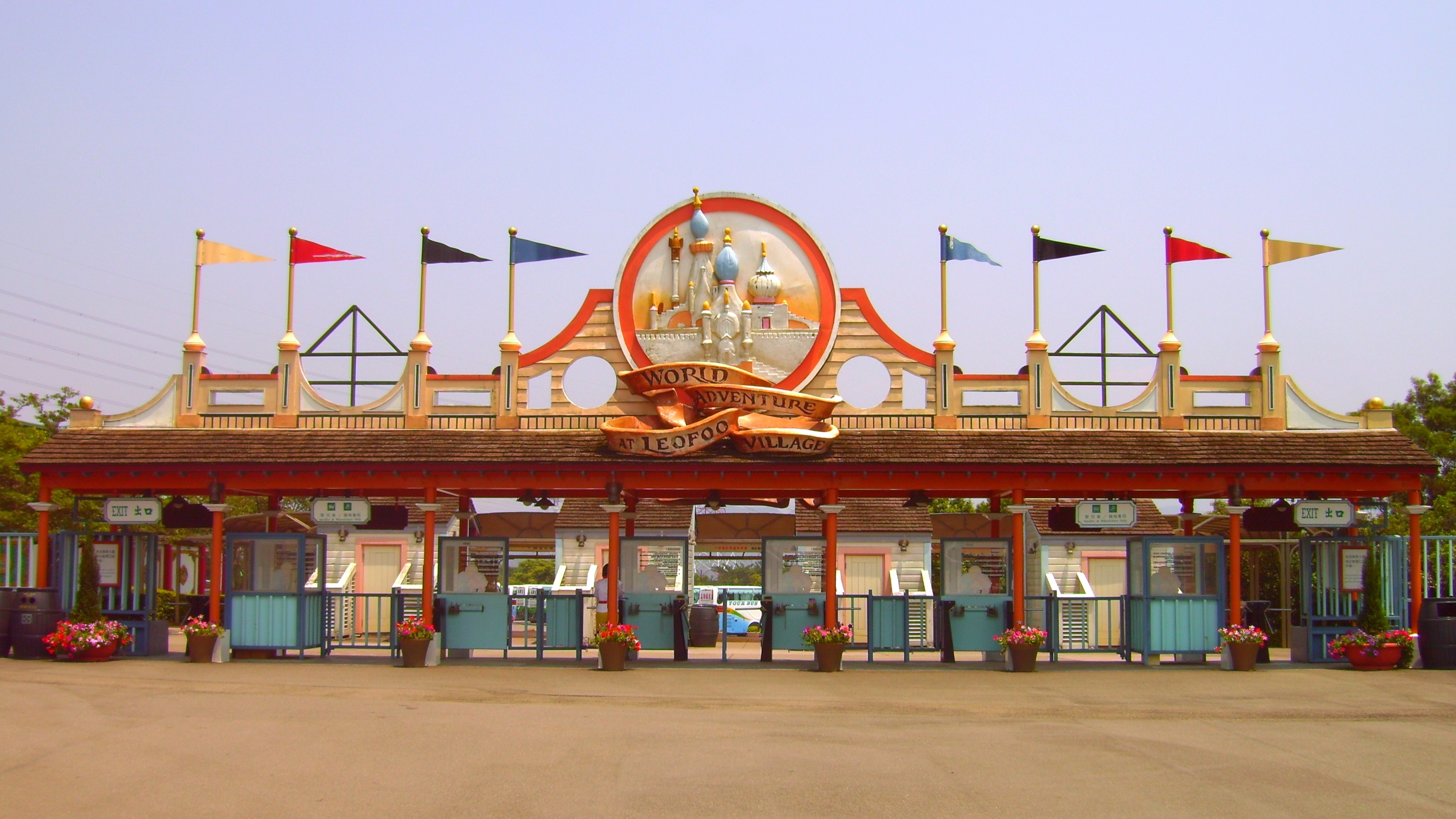
- Leofoo Village Theme Park main entrance.
- Interactive map of Leofoo Village Theme Park
- Location: Guanxi, Hsinchu County, Taiwan
- Coordinates: 24°49′16″N 121°10′54″E
- Status: Operating
- Opened: 1979
- Website: Official website

The Leofoo Village Theme Park (Chinese: 六福村主題遊樂園; pinyin: Liùfú Cūn Zhǔtí Yóulèyuán) is a theme park and a safari located in Guanxi Township, Hsinchu County, Taiwan. It features three roller coasters, including an inverted shuttle coaster, Screaming Condor, an Intamin twist-and-turn coaster dubbed Sahara Twist, as well as a Vekoma Roller Skater (335m) in the Wild West section of the park, Little Rattler, themed to an old mining railway. There is also the Nairobi Express, a 2 ft (610 mm) narrow gauge railway built by Severn Lamb. The park features many other attractions of different styles and proper themed areas.

== History ==
The Leofoo Village Theme Park was originally established in 1979 as Leofoo Wildlife Park. In 1989, the wildlife park was reestablished to Leofoo Village Theme Park.

In 2023, a baboon escaped from Leofoo Village, and was eventually killed. After initially refusing to admit the baboon had escaped from Leofoo, the Park later admitted the baboon had come from the Park and apologized.

== Themed areas ==
Arabian Kingdom is an adventure–magical themed area, featuring attractions such as the Ring of Fire, spinning riders on the inside of a large metal circle in continuous loops. Possibly the top attraction with families is the Flying Horse ride, which is a dark ride–monorail. Another dark ride, similar to the Indiana Jones Adventure at Disneyland, is called the Sultan's Adventure, an Intamin high-speed jeep ride.

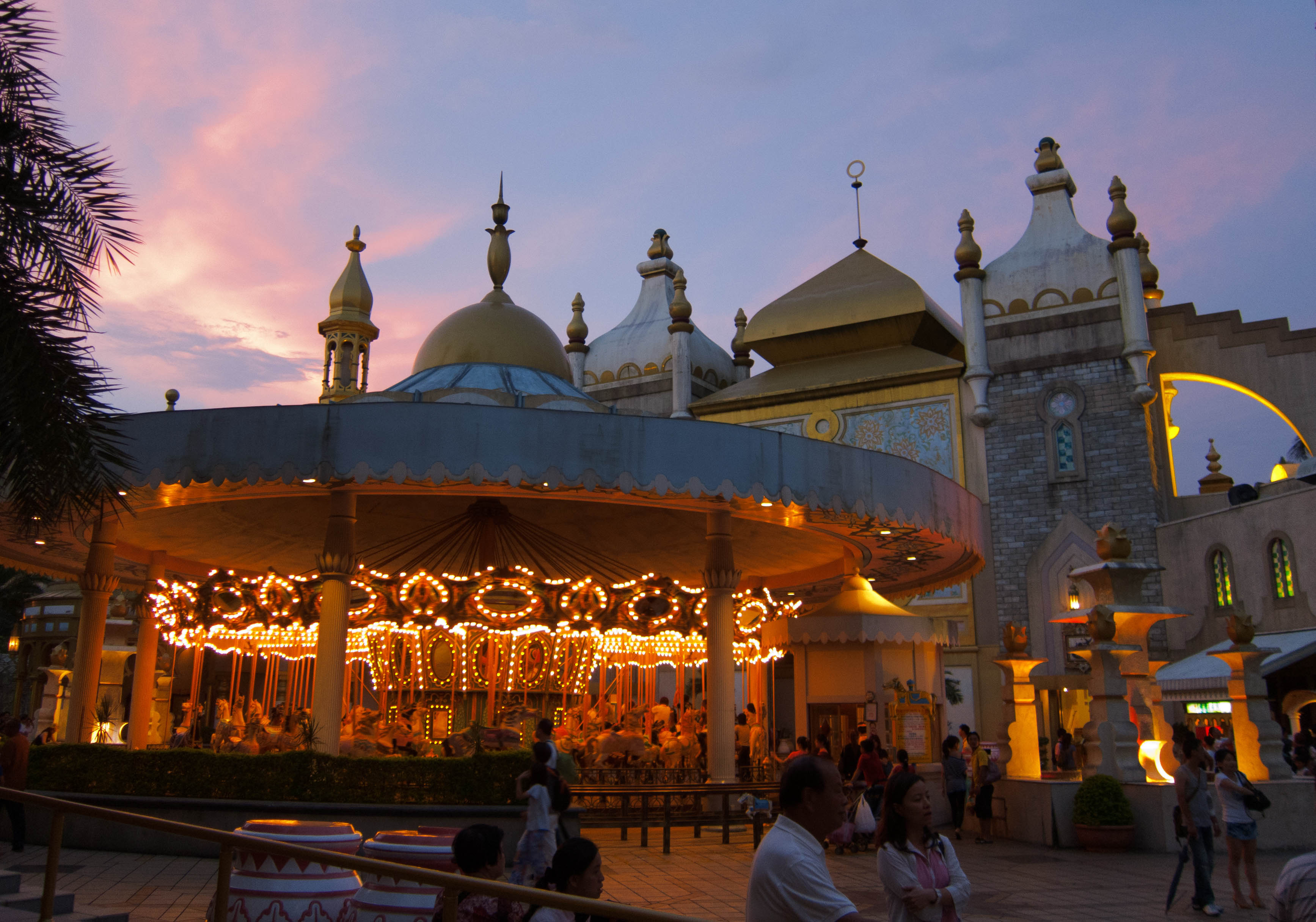
Ali-Baba and the 40 Thieves.

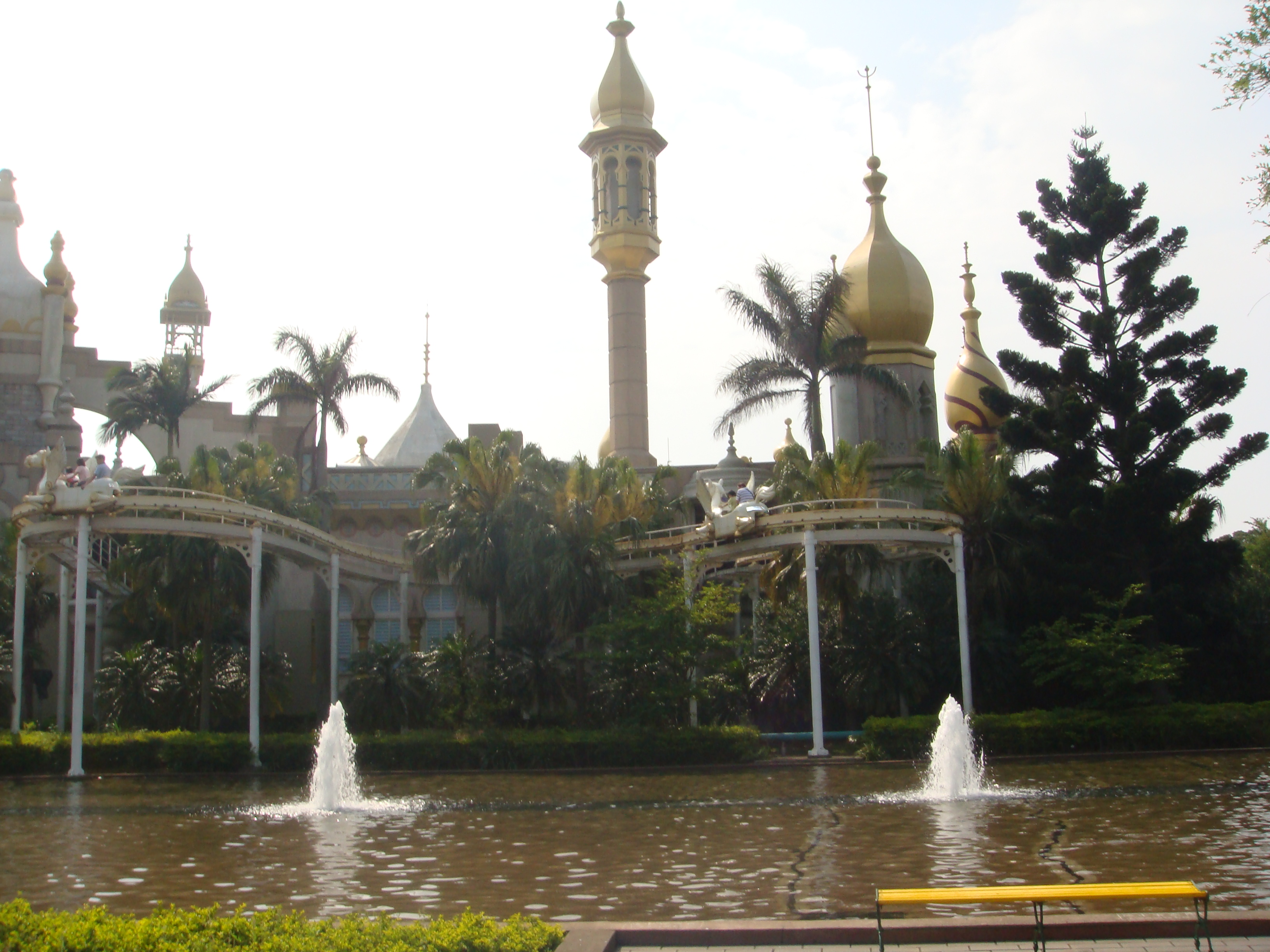
Flying Horses.

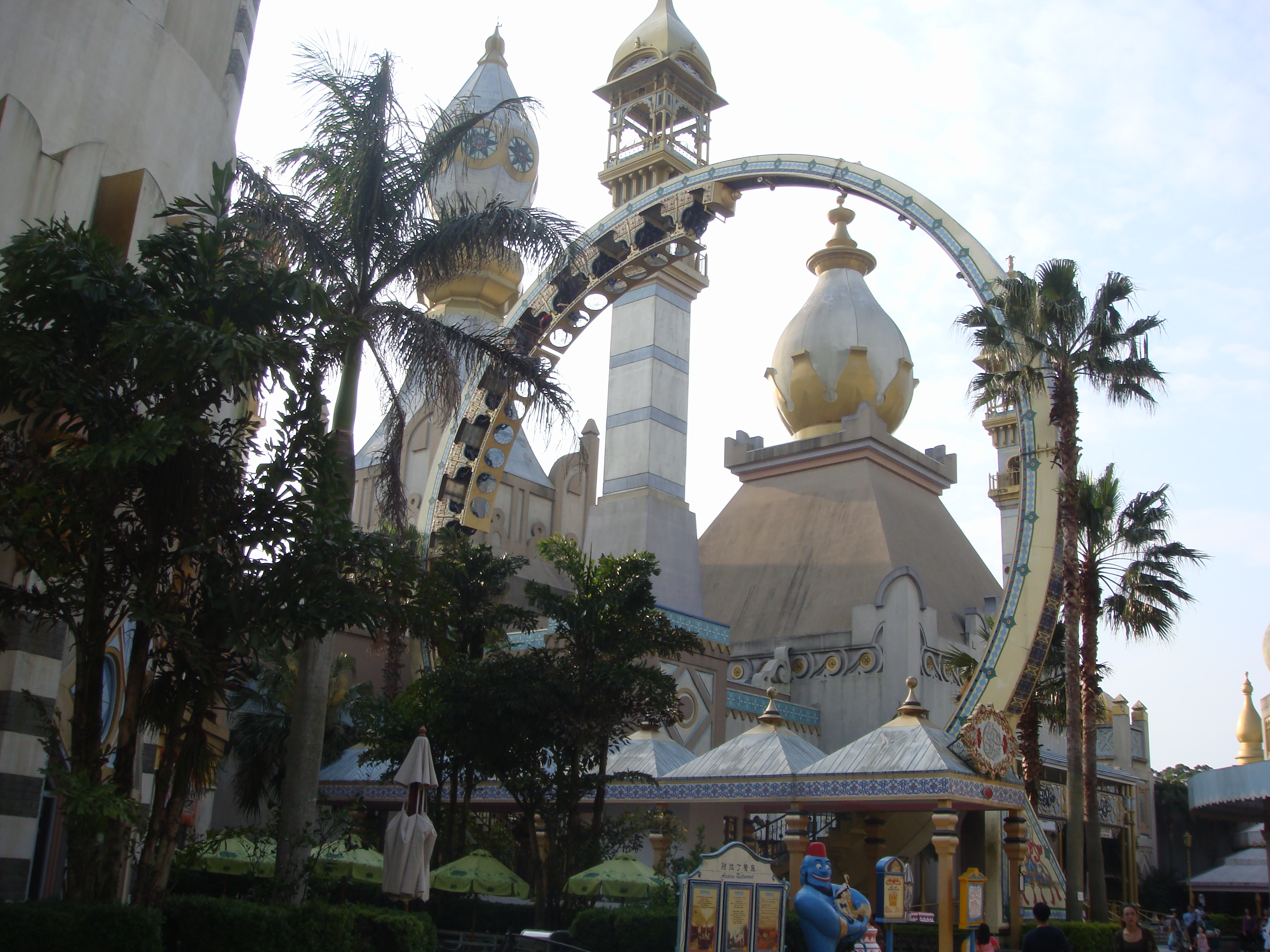
Ring of Fire.

African Safari is a wild safari-themed area, featuring many animal-interactive attractions, as well as many other rides. This area is the gateway to the safari inside Leofoo Village, and can be viewed from a steam train that departs from a station inside the area, or a bus. The top attraction is probably Sahara Twist, an Intamin Twist-and-Turn coaster. The coaster's layout plunges the riders down and up, through banked turns and down curved inclines. Other attractions include horse riding, horse feeding, and a horse-themed tracked ride and other horse activities. You can see American black bears, Bengal tigers, African lions and baboons while riding on the tour bus.

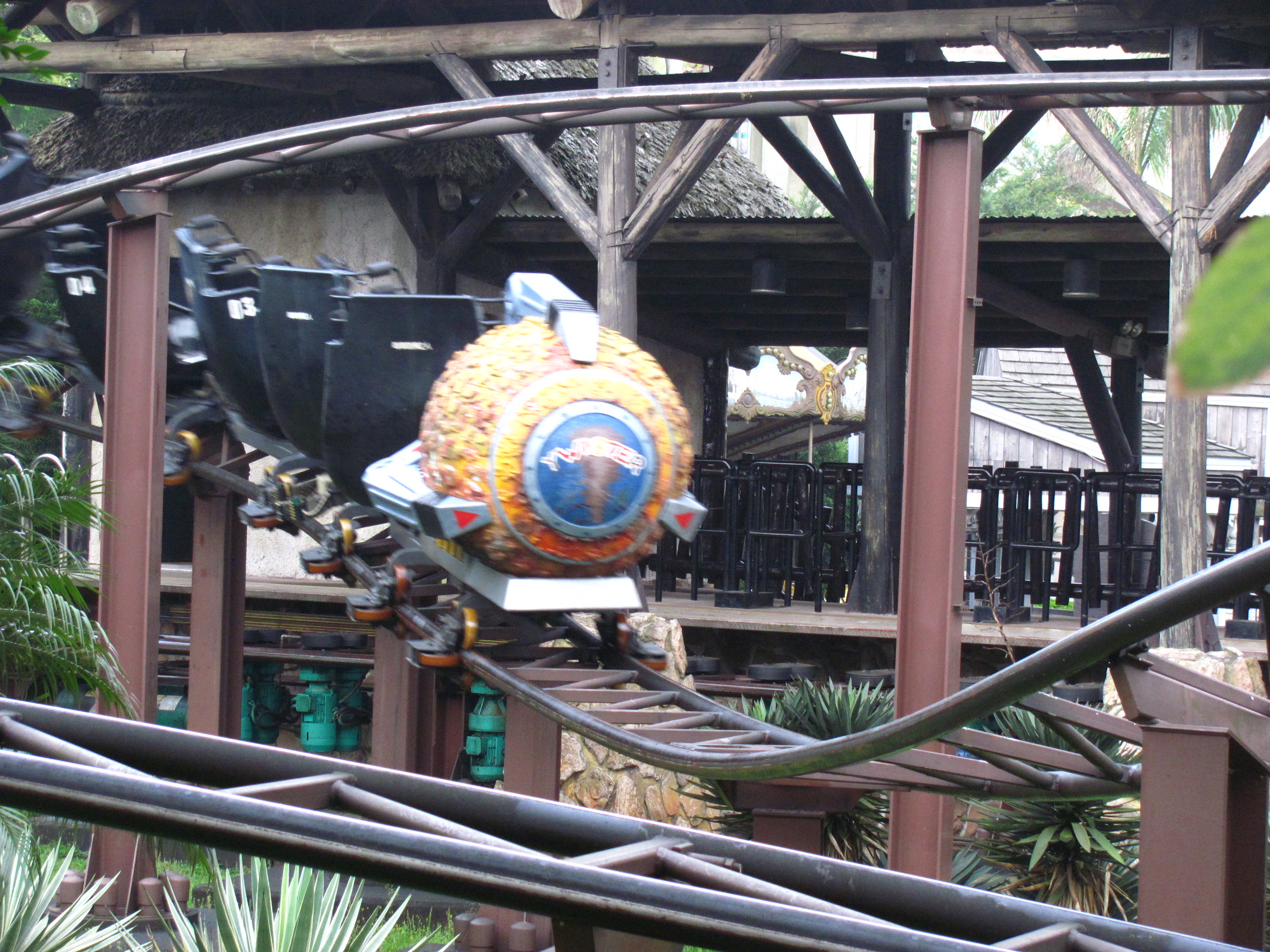
Sahara Twist.

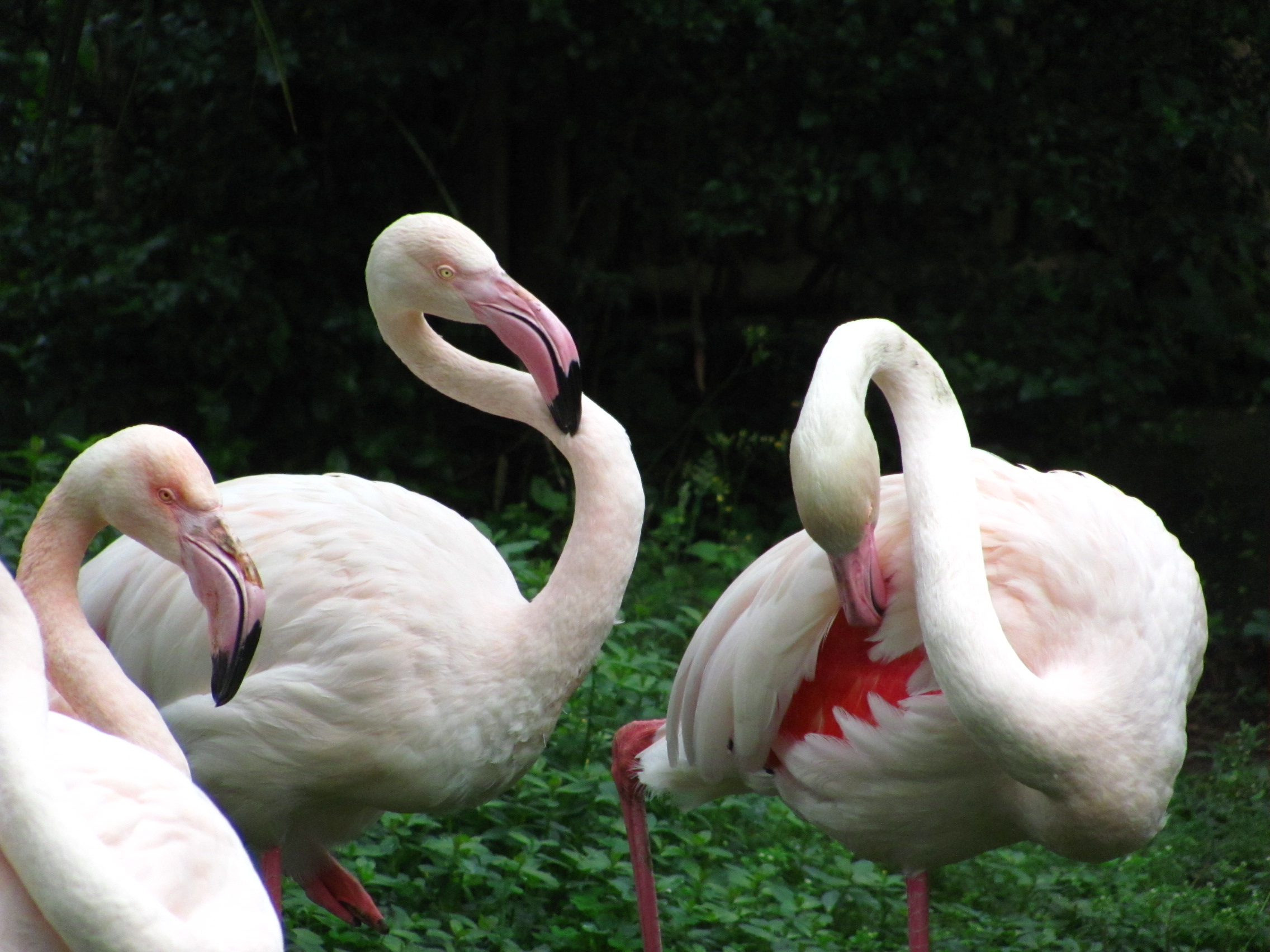

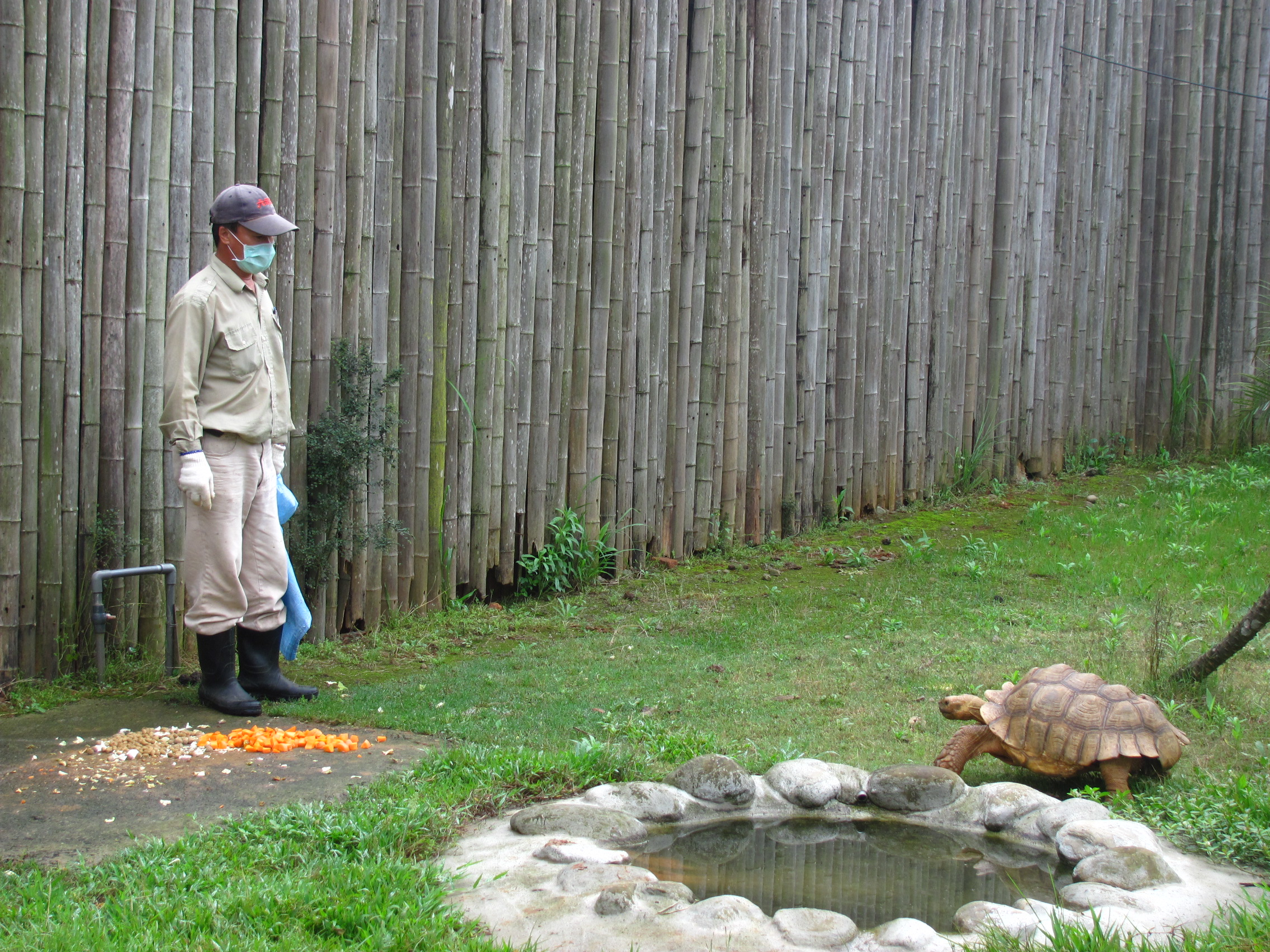

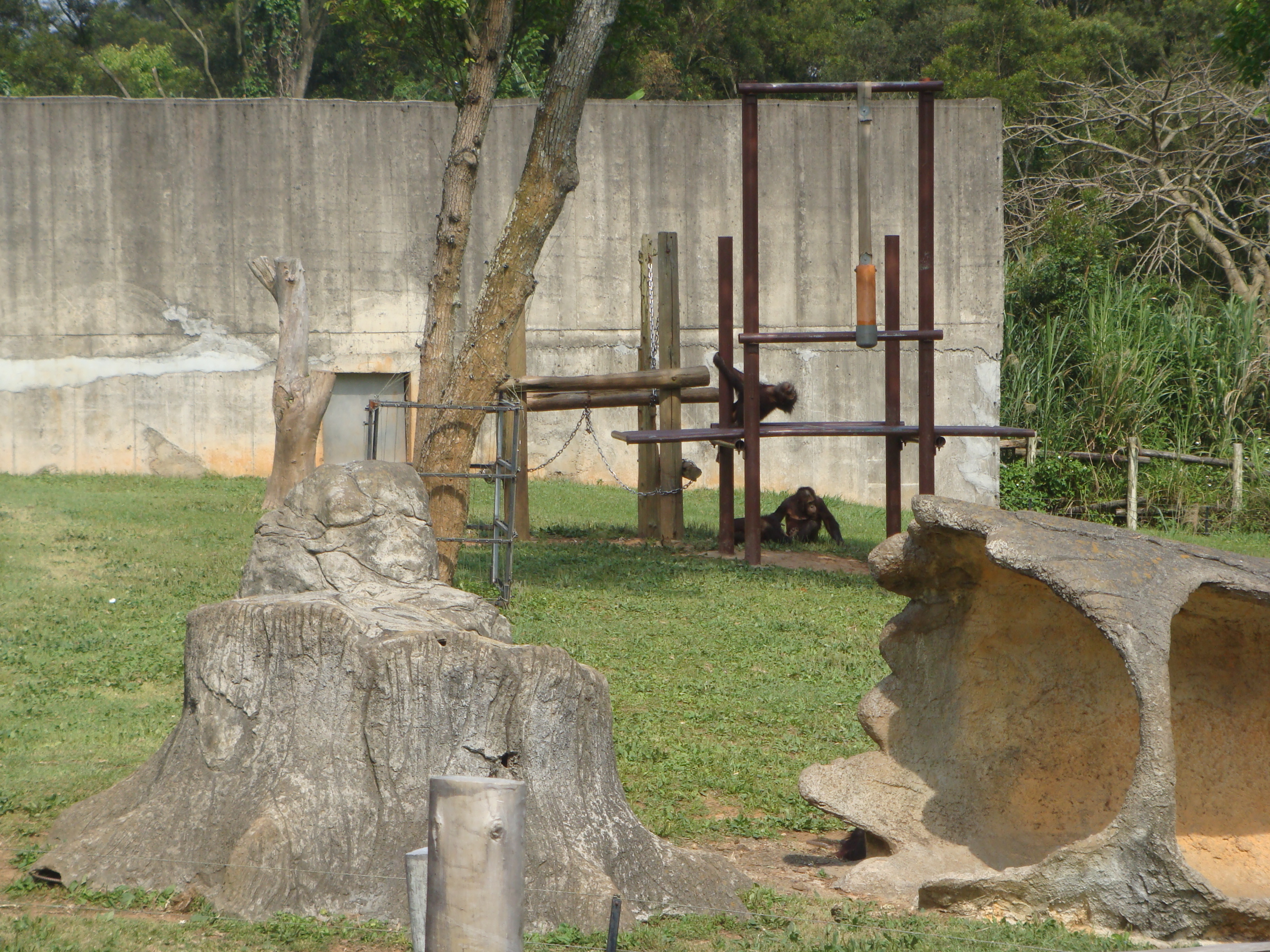

South Pacific is a tropical-themed area, with many thrill rides and exciting attractions. The top attractions are an Intamin Drop Tower, Pagoda's Revenge, dropping riders from a giant mask back to the ground, and an Intamin log flume called Mighty Mountain Flume Adventure.

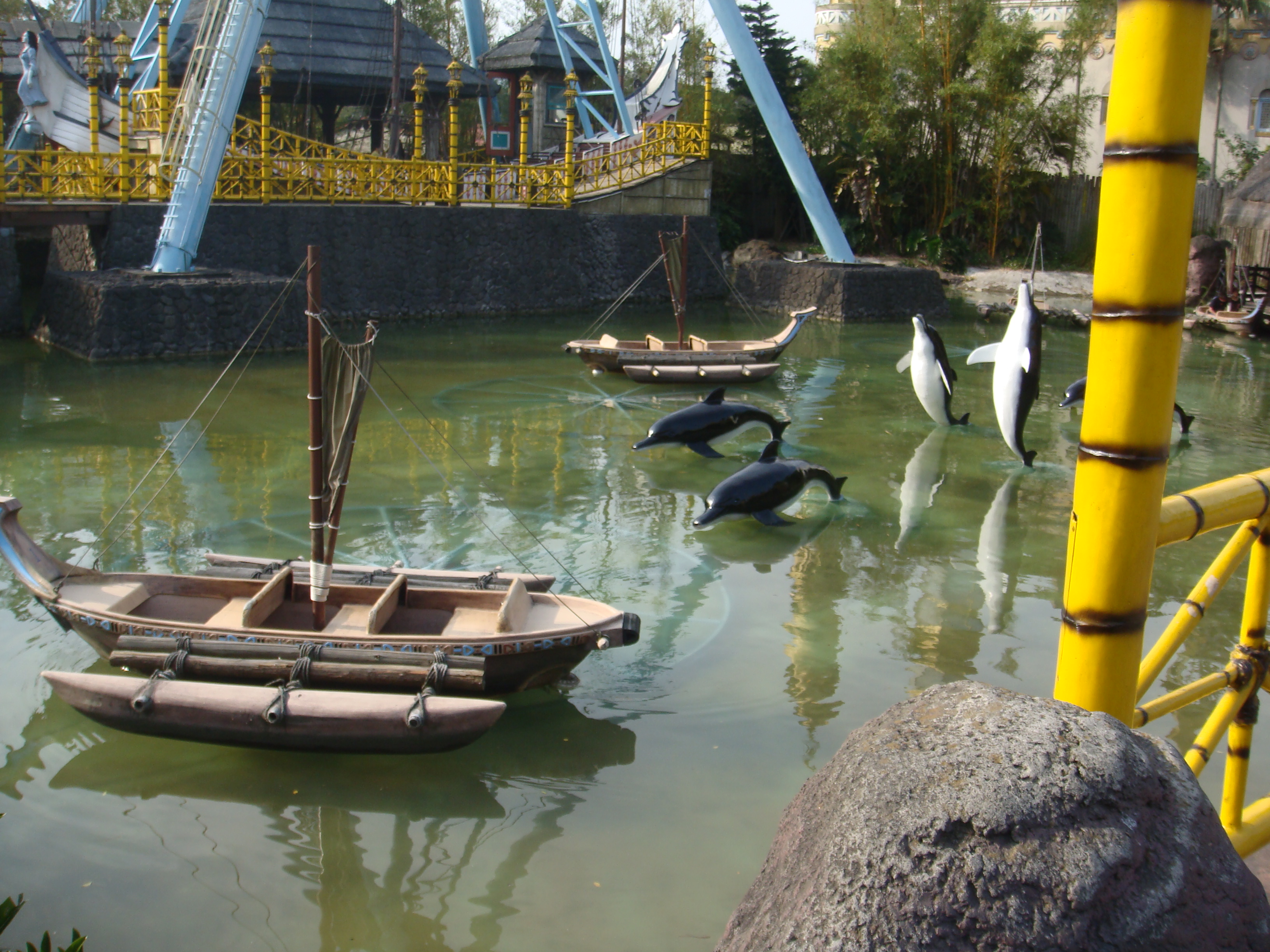
Kid’s Catamaran.

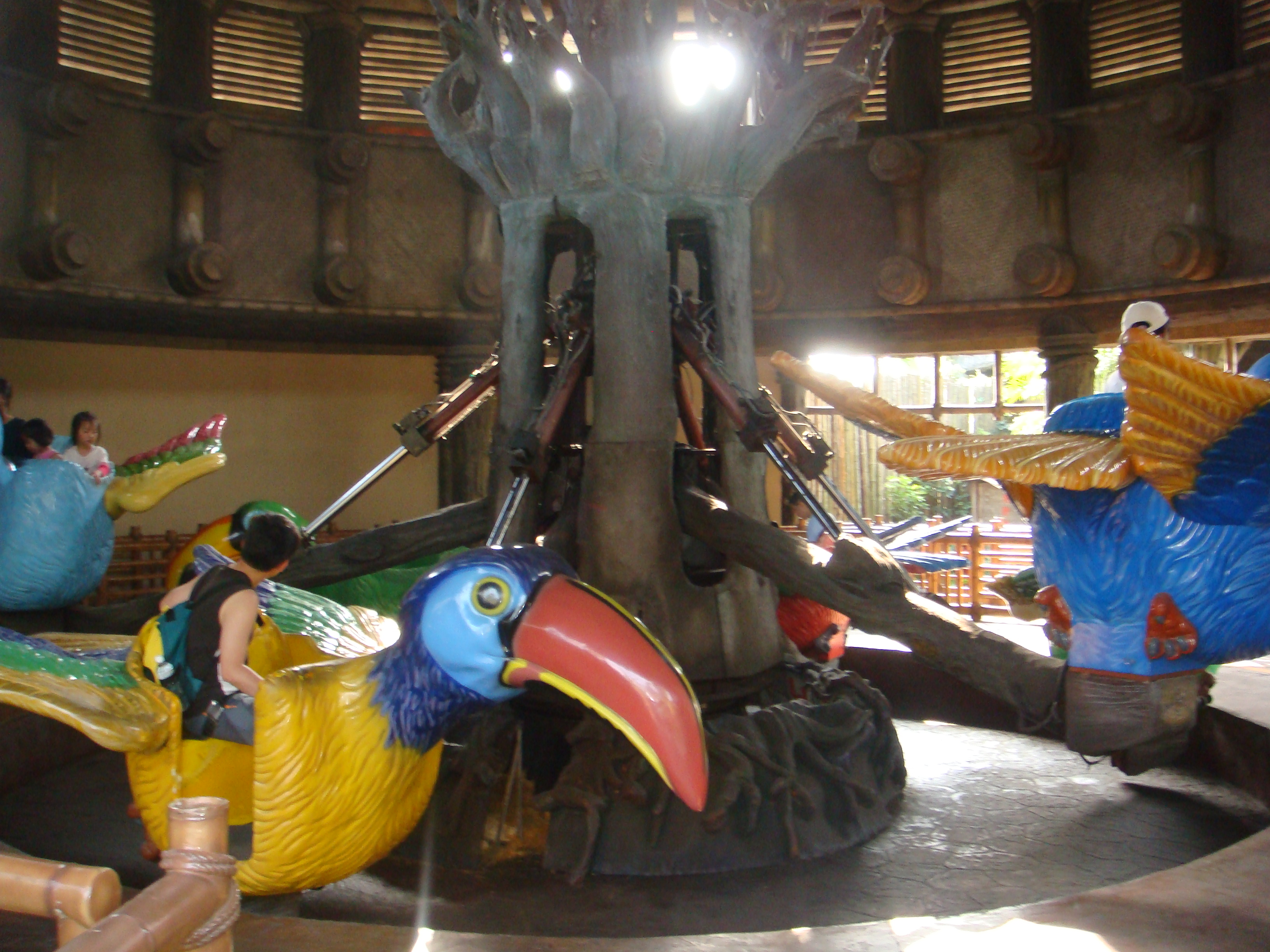
Bird Flight.

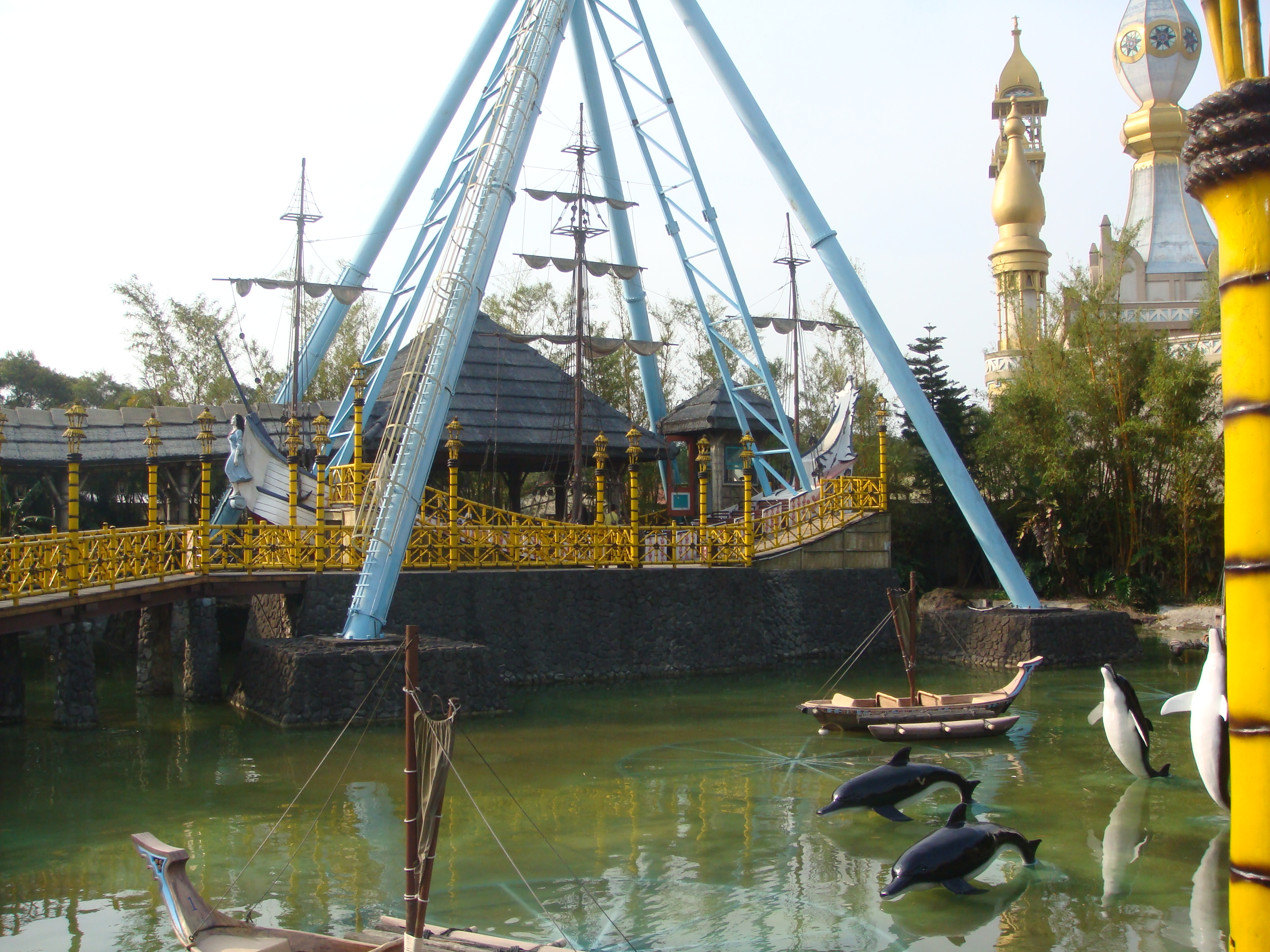
Captain Cook's Swinging Ship.

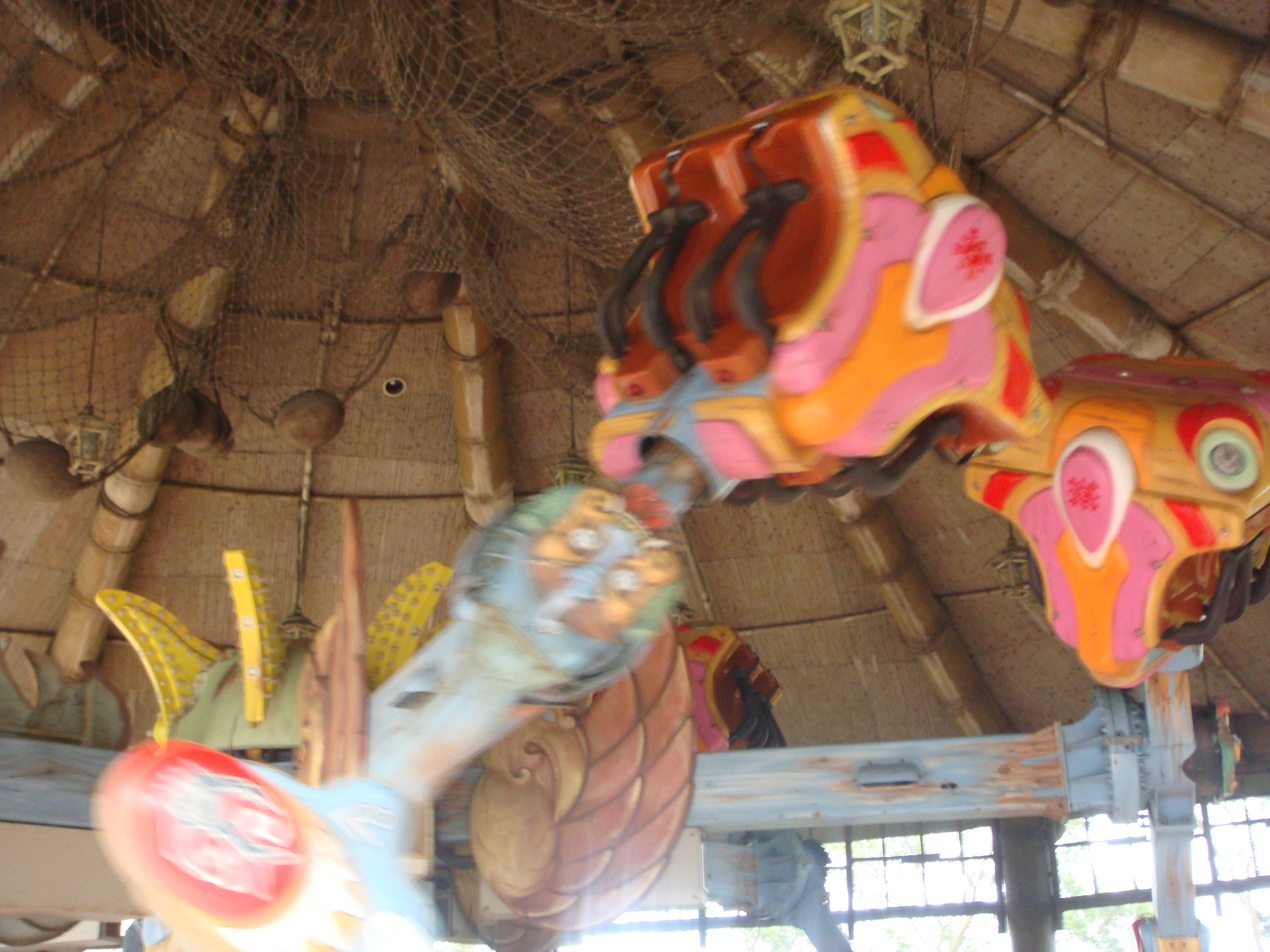
Deep Sea Adventure.

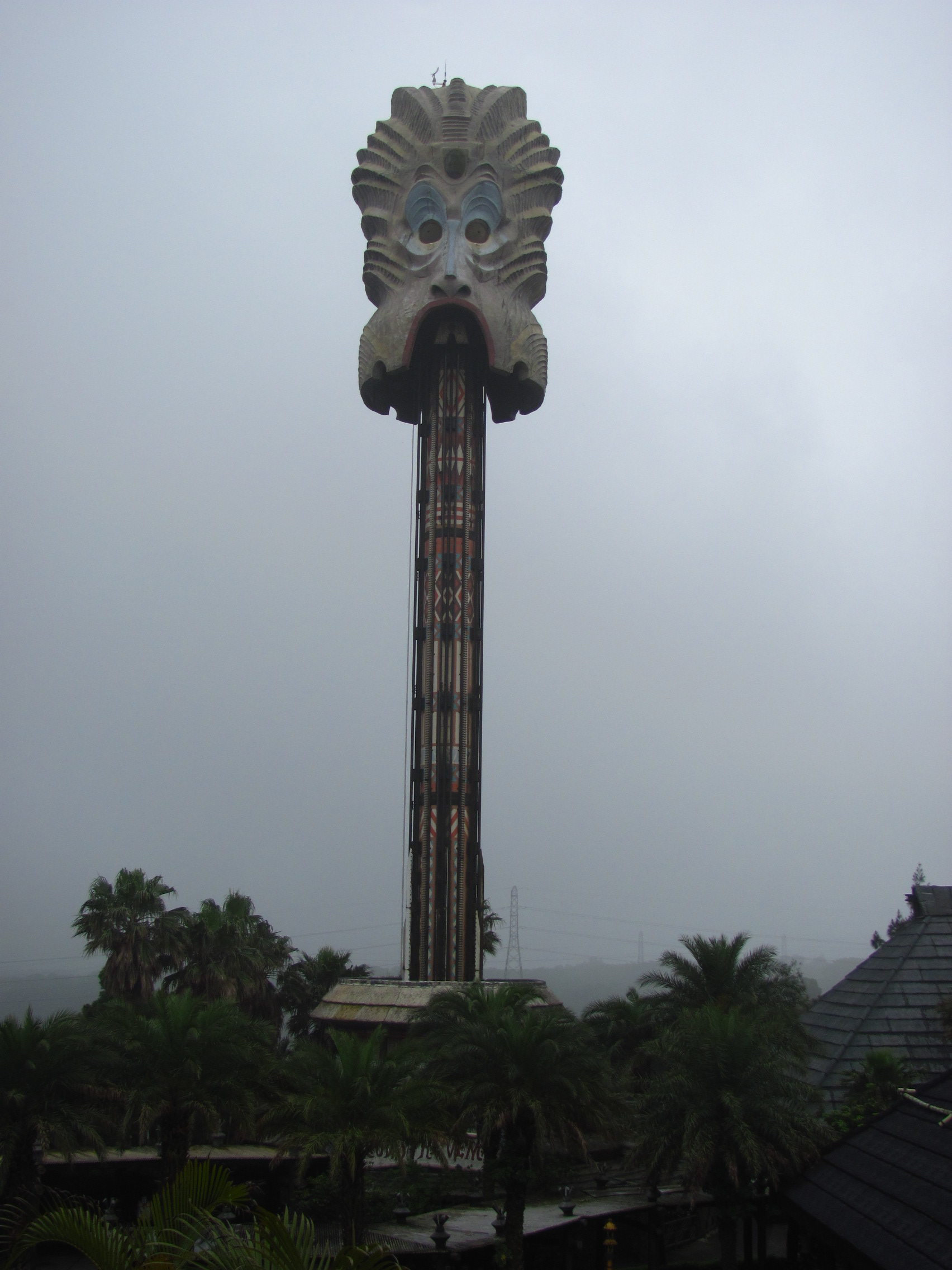
Pagoda's Revenge.

Wild West is an old-west-themed area, with numerous live shows, photo spots, and thrills. The center attraction is an inverted coaster called Screaming Condor, and a slightly less popular attraction, a Vekoma coaster, Little Rattler, themed to an old railroad. Wild West is also the home to the Big Canyon Rapids, a river rapids ride.

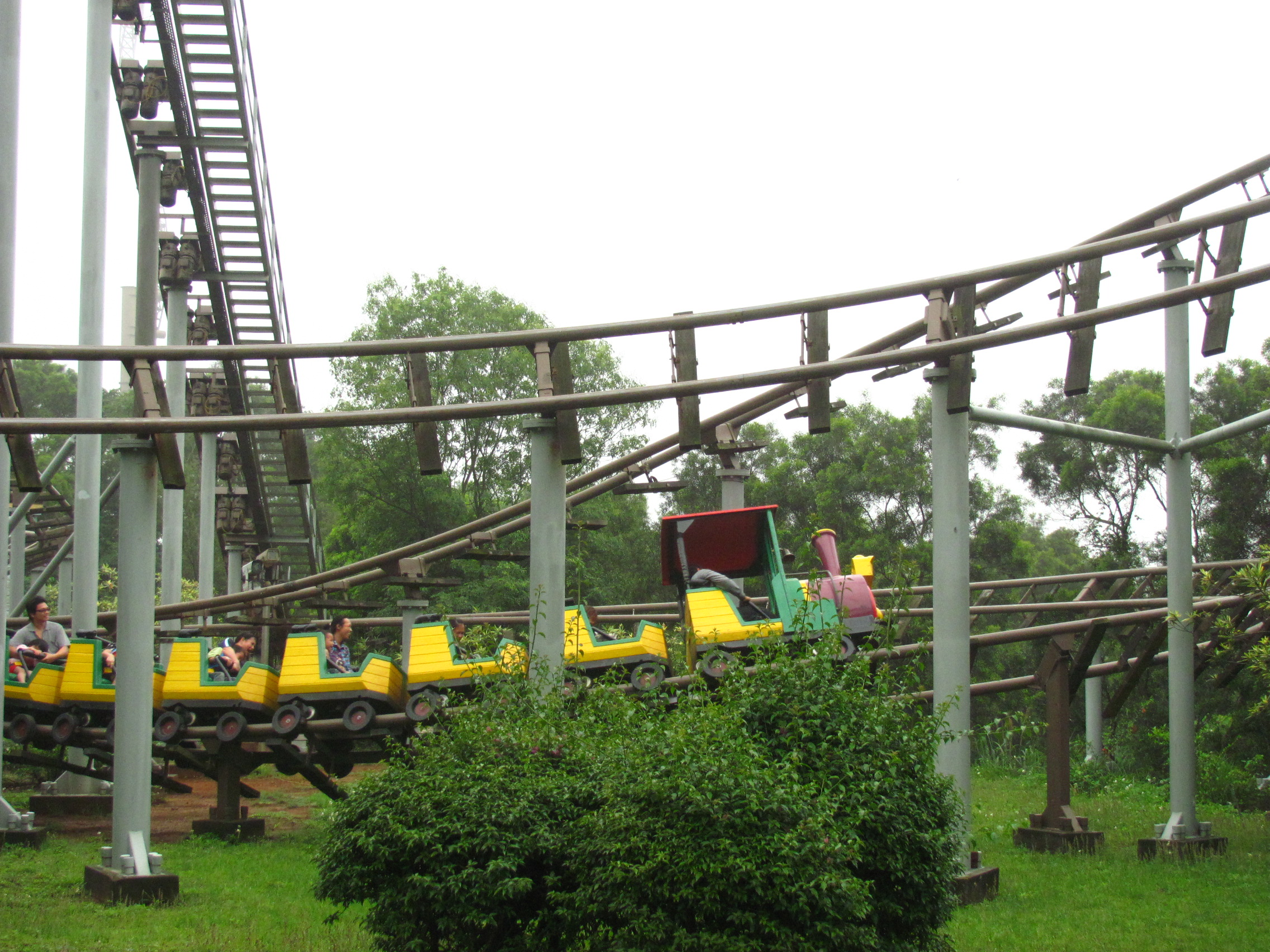
Little Rattler.

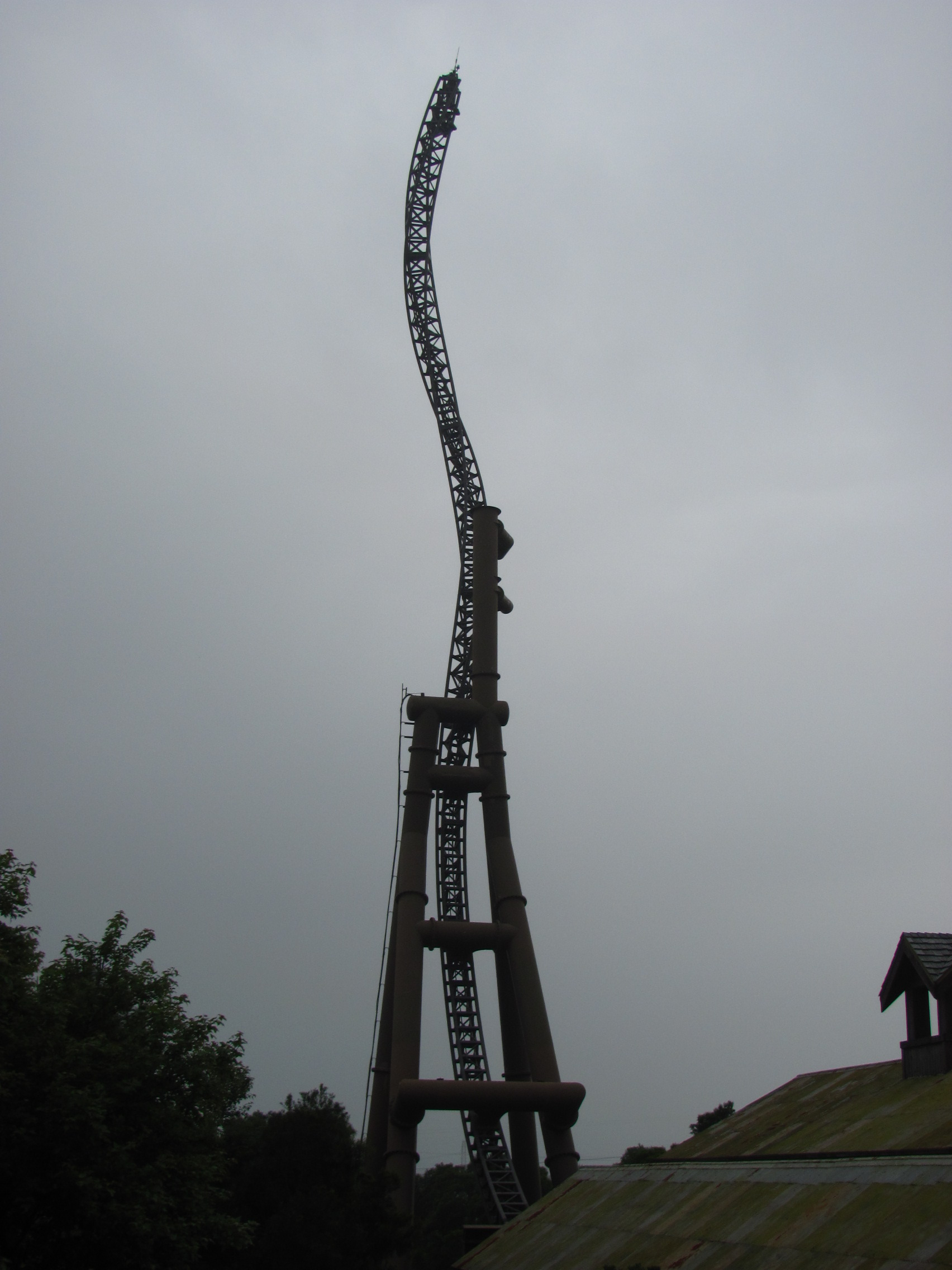
Screaming Condor.

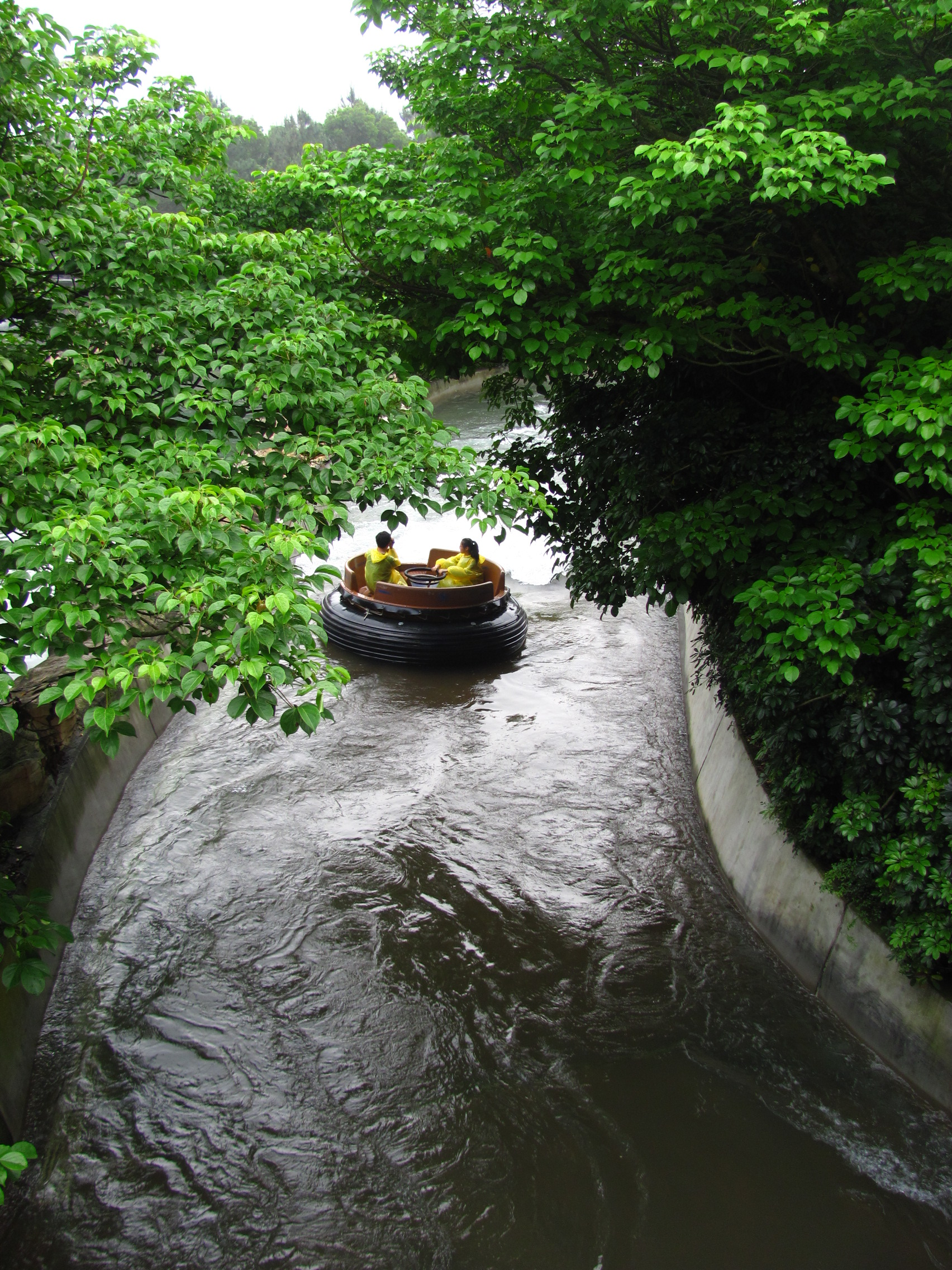
Big Canyon Rapids Ride.

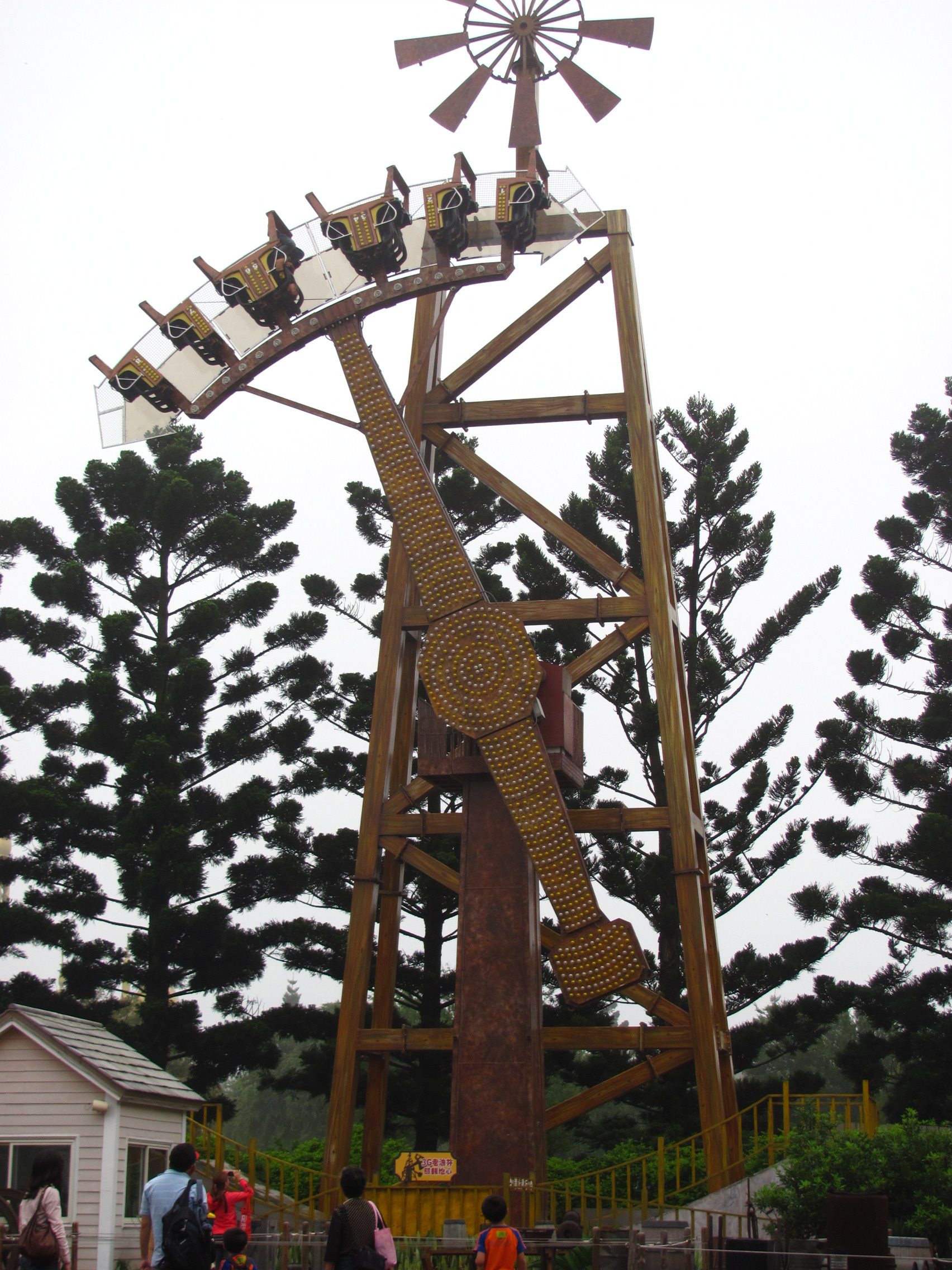
Old Oil Well.

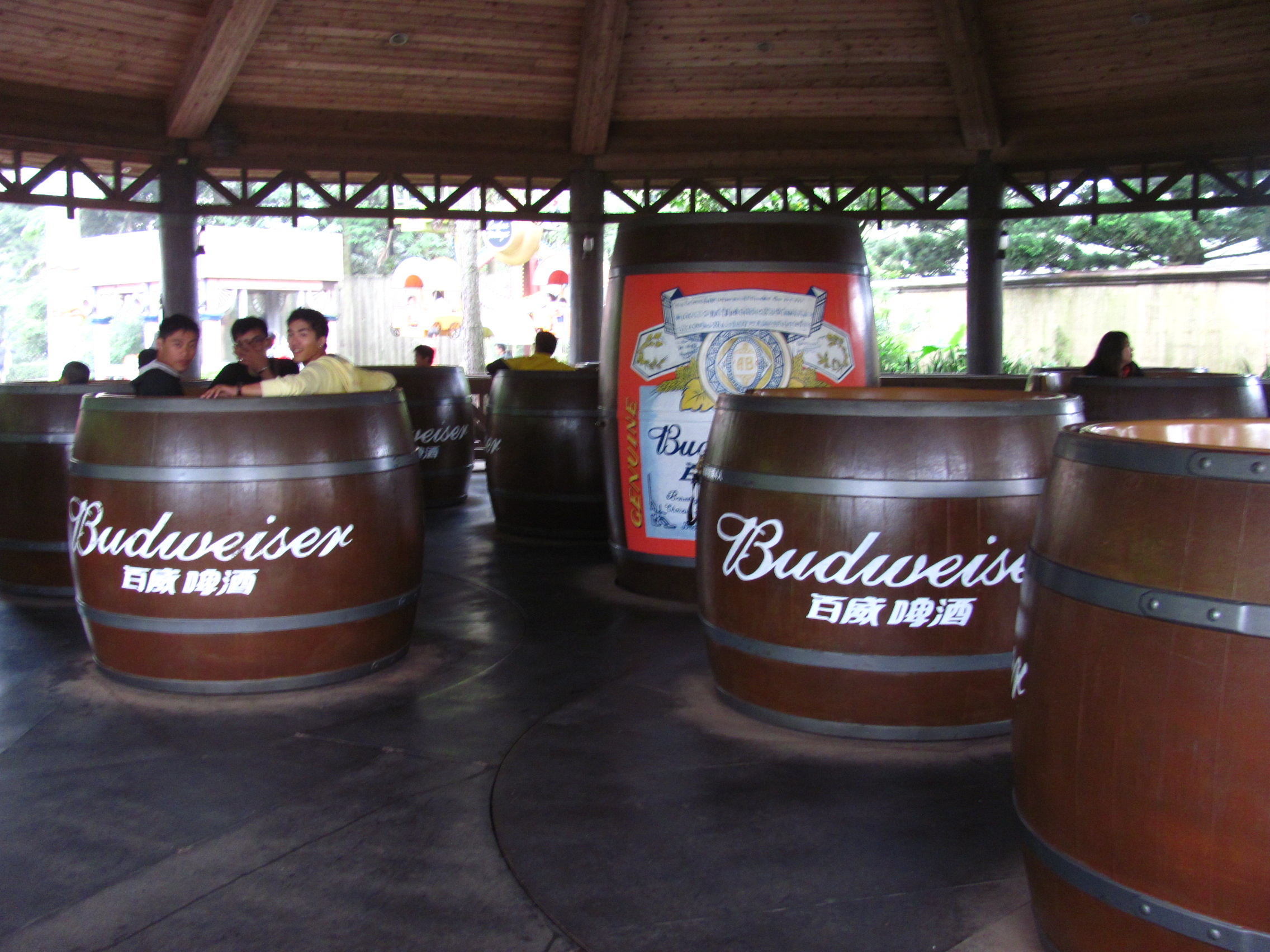
Pancho Villas Crazy Barrel.

== See also ==
- List of tourist attractions in Taiwan
