= 1994 in Taiwan =

- Decades: 1970s; 1980s; 1990s; 2000s; 2010s
- See also: Other events of 1994; History of Taiwan • Timeline • Years

Events from the year 1994 in Taiwan. This year is numbered Minguo 83 according to the official Republic of China calendar.

== Incumbents ==
- President – Lee Teng-hui
- Vice President – Li Yuan-tsu
- Premier – Lien Chan
- Vice Premier – Hsu Li-teh

== Events ==
=== March ===
- 1 March – The opening of the civil section of Kinmen Airport in Kinmen County.
- 13 March – The opening of Kaohsiung Museum of Shadow Puppet in Gangshan Township, Kaohsiung County.

=== June ===
- 9 June – The opening of Shung Ye Museum of Formosan Aborigines in Taipei.

=== August ===
- 6 August – The establishment of Lee Tze-fan Memorial Art Gallery in Hsinchu City.

=== September ===
- 1 September
  - The establishment of CTi International.
  - The establishment of CTi Variety.
- 16 September – The 6.8 M_{w} Taiwan Strait earthquake occurred.

=== November ===
- 28 – The establishment of Pingtung Airport in Pingtung County.

== Births ==
- 24 April – Tsao Yu-ning, actor
- 3 October – Tseng Jen-ho, baseball player
- 4 November – Huang Yun-wen, taekwondo athlete
