= Hsin Tao Power Corporation =

Hsin Tao Power Corporation 新桃電力
- Industry: Electric power
- Founded: 16 June 1998
- Headquarters: Guanxi, Hsinchu County, Taiwan
- Parent: Marubeni Corporation

The Hsin Tao Power Corporation (Chinese: 新桃電力; pinyin: Xīntáo Diànlì) is an independent power producer company in Taiwan. It has been involved in the power sales business scheme with Taipower for over 25 years.

== Power plants ==
- Hsintao Power Plant in Guangxi Township, Hsinchu County.

== See also ==
- Electricity sector in Taiwan
- List of power stations in Taiwan
