= Hsieh Chun-hui =

Taiwanese politician

Hsieh Chun-hui (Chinese: 謝鈞惠; pinyin: Xiè Jūnhuì; 1939–2002) was a Taiwanese politician.

Hsieh served four terms on the Taiwan Provincial Assembly and two terms on the Tainan County Council before his 2001 election to the Legislative Yuan as a member of the People First Party representing Tainan County. He died on 13 October 2002, while in office. In accordance with the Civil Servants Election and Recall Act, Hsieh's legislative seat remained empty until full term elections were next held in 2004.
