= Europe This Week =

- Genre: Business news, analysis
- Presented by: Guy Johnson (2007–); Louisa Bojesen (2010–); Anna Edwards (2008–2010); Simon Hobbs (2005–2007); Jo Sheldon (?–2002)
- Country of origin: United Kingdom
- Original language: English

Production
- Running time: 30 minutes

Original release
- Network: CNBC Europe
- Release: 1998 – 2002; 2005 – present

Europe This Week is a business news show aired on CNBC Europe and on CNBC World in the US, co-presented by Guy Johnson and Louisa Bojesen, from 6pm to 6:30pm CET (12pm to 12:30pm EST) on Fridays.

The programme, presented from CNBC Europe's London studios, examines stock markets and the economy in Europe during the past week, and sets the agenda for the coming week. Occasionally, special editions of the programme are presented on location from the site of EU summits and major elections.

Europe This Week is re-aired as part of weekend programming on CNBC Europe and the CNBC World channel in the United States.
