= Candy Hsu =

Taiwanese musician

Candy Hsu 許雅涵
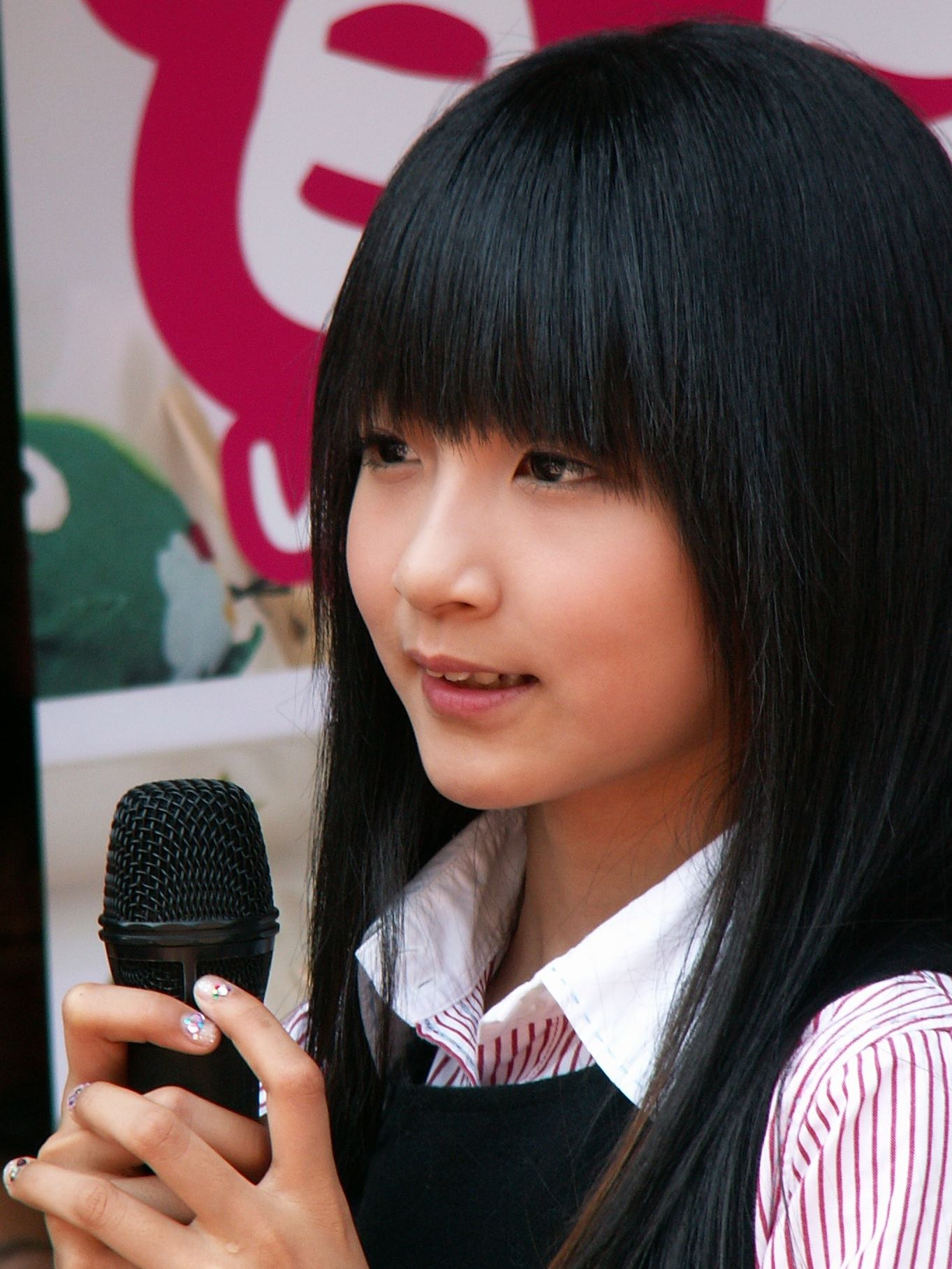
- Candy Hsu on 26 April 2008
- Born: 10 February 1998 (age 27); Kaohsiung, Taiwan
- Occupations: Singer-songwriter, actress
- Years active: 2008–present
- Awards: 2006 Chunghwa Telecom MOD Star Contest (winner)

Chinese name
- Traditional Chinese: 許雅涵
- Simplified Chinese: 许雅涵
Transcriptions
Standard Mandarin
- Hanyu Pinyin: Xǔ Yǎhán
- Musical career
- Also known as: Candy, Candy Xu, Xu Yahan, Xu Ya Han
- Origin: Taiwan
- Genres: Mandopop
- Instruments: Vocals, piano, saxophone, guitar
- Labels: Avex Taiwan, Pure Music
- Website: www.avex.com.tw/candy/ puremusic.com.tw

Candy Hsu (Chinese: 許雅涵; pinyin: Xǔ Yǎhán; born 10 February 1998) is a Taiwanese singer-songwriter and actress. She writes, composes her own songs, and plays instruments such as piano, saxophone and guitar.

== Biography ==
Candy Hsu's parents are professional musicians.

In 2006, 8-year-old Candy entered a singer-songwriter contest with the song "Vanilla Kitty", that she composed at the age of 6, in 2004. The large competition, called Chunghwa Telecom MOD Star Contest, made her a star. After the 6 long months of preliminaries, semi-finals and finals, Candy Hsu was declared winner.

Candy's first official album, also titled "Vanilla Kitty", was released by Avex Taiwan on 29 February 2008. All the songs on the album were written by her. "Vanilla Kitty" topped sales charts.

In January 2012, Candy Hsu started filming in her debut movie, Kidnapping of a Big Star (Chinese: 绑架大明星; pinyin: Bǎngjià Dà Míngxīng), directed by Zhang Jiabei, notably the director of Midnight Beating. She has a leading role in it, playing alongside Daniel Chan and Kristy Yeung.

As of September 2012, she was endorsing the trade fair Music China Shanghai (Chinese: 上海音樂節), that would take place from 11 to 14 October.

== Discography ==
=== Albums ===
1. Vanilla Kitty (Chinese: 香草咪咪; pinyin: Xiāngcǎo Mīmī) (Avex Taiwan, 29 February 2008)
2. Angel (Chinese: 天使; pinyin: Tiānshǐ) (Pure Music, 15 July 2010)

=== EPs ===
- "Yongyuan De Chengnuo" (Chinese: 永遠的承諾; pinyin: Yǒngyuǎn De Chéngnuò) (with Devin Wu (Chinese: 吳佩珊; pinyin: Wú Pèishān)) (Pure Music, 4 July 2011)

=== Music videos ===
2008

- "Candy Box"
- "Vanilla Kitty" (Chinese: 香草咪咪; pinyin: Xiāngcǎo Mīmī)
- "Xingfu De Maopao" (Chinese: 幸福得冒泡; pinyin: Xìngfú De Màopào; lit. 'So Happy It's Bubbling')

2010

- "Tianshi Zhi Lian" (Chinese: 天使之戀; pinyin: Tiānshǐ Zhī Liàn; lit. 'Angel Love')
- "Sui Boli" (Chinese: 碎玻璃; pinyin: Suì Bōlí; lit. 'Broken Glass')
- "Ya Da Di"

2011

- "Yongyuan De Chengnuo" (Chinese: 永遠的承諾; pinyin: Yǒngyuǎn De Chéngnuò)

== Filmography ==
=== Movies ===
Year	English title	Original title	Role	Notes
2008	My So-called Love	愛的、發聲練習	Cat (Barbie Shu's character) as a child	Released in Taiwan on 21 November 2008
2013	Kidnapping of a Big Star	綁架大明星	Gao Xiao-chan (the main heroine)	Released in China on 12 July 2013
