= 1999 Democratic Progressive Party presidential primary =

- April 15, 1999
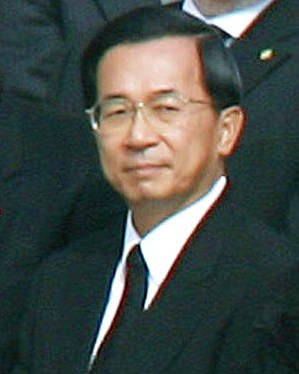

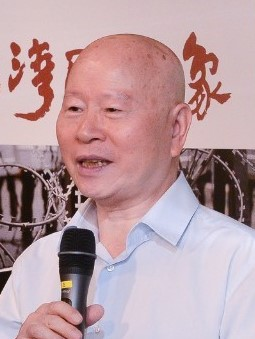

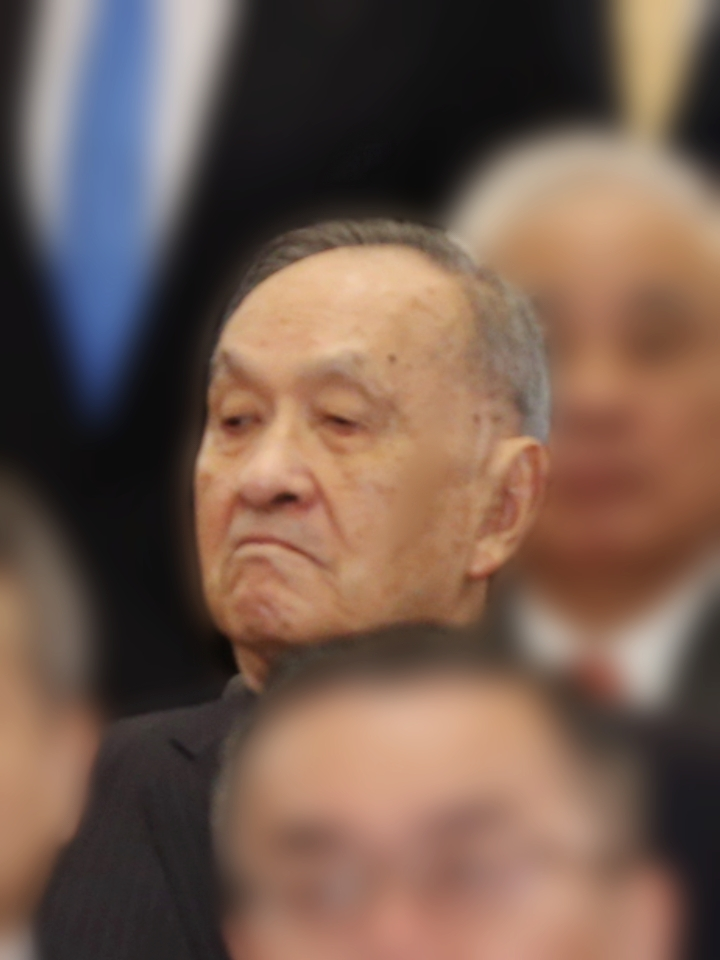
Candidate	Chen Shui-bian	Hsu Hsin-liang	Peng Ming-min
Popular vote	70,651	46,883	3,583
Percentage	58.33%	38.71%	2.96%
DPP nominee before election
Peng Ming-min
Elected DPP nominee
Chen Shui-bian

The 1999 Democratic Progressive Party presidential primary was the selection process by which the Democratic Progressive Party of the Republic of China (Taiwan) chose its candidate for the 2000 presidential election. The DPP candidate for president was selected through a series of member of the party in Thursday, April 15, 1999.

== Result ==
Candidate	Votes	Percentage
Chen	70,651	58.33
Hsu	46,883	38.71
Peng	3,583	2.96
