= Liu Sheng-yi =

Taiwanese footballer

Personal information
- Date of birth: 21 November 1995 (age 30)
- Place of birth: Taiwan
- Position: Midfielder

Team information
- Current team: Tatung
- Number: 23

College career
Years	Team	Apps	(Gls)
–2016	University of Taipei		

Senior career*
Years	Team	Apps	(Gls)
2017–	Tatung		

International career^{‡}
2013	Chinese Taipei U18	5	(4)
2016	Chinese Taipei	5	(0)
- * Club domestic league appearances and goals as of 16:48, 1 June 2017 (UTC) ‡ National team caps and goals as of 16:48, 4 December 2019 (UTC)

Liu Sheng-yi (Chinese: 劉勝億; pinyin: Liú Shèngyì; born 21 November 1995) is a Taiwanese international footballer who plays as a midfielder for Tatung.

== International career ==
Liu made his international debut in a 2–0 away loss to Cambodia, replacing Lin Che-yu in the 77th minute.

== Career statistics ==
=== International ===
As of matches played 1 June 2017.

National team	Year	Apps	Goals
Chinese Taipei	2016	5	0
Total		5	0
