= A New Partnership Between the Indigenous Peoples and the Government of Taiwan =

A New Partnership Between the Indigenous Peoples and the Government of Taiwan (Chinese: 原住民族和台灣政府新的夥伴關係; pinyin: Yuán Zhù Mínzú Hé Táiwān Zhèngfǔ Xīn De Huǒbàn Guānxì) is a treaty-like document signed in Orchid Island, Taiwan on 10 September 1999 by the representatives of the indigenous peoples of Taiwan and the then-presidential candidate Chen Shui-bian (who went on to win the 2000 presidential election for the Democratic Progressive Party).

The seven articles in the documents include:

1. Recognizing the inherent sovereignty of Taiwan's Indigenous Peoples
2. Promoting autonomy for Indigenous Peoples
3. Concluding a land treaty with Taiwan's Indigenous Peoples
4. Reinstating traditional names of Indigenous communities and natural landmarks
5. Recovering traditional territories of Indigenous communities and Peoples
6. Recovering use of traditional natural resources and furthering the development of self-determination
7. Providing legislative (parliamentary) representation for each Indigenous People

The document later became the official indigenous policy for the DPP Government. However, as the document was signed before Chen Shui-bian became the President, the efficacy of the document has been contested.

On 19 October 2002, Chen, as the head of state and government, reaffirmed the new partnership between indigenous nations and the Government of Taiwan in a ceremony with indigenous tribal representatives.

== See also ==
- Taiwanese aborigines
