= Children Are Us Foundation =

Charity in Taiwan

- 喜憨兒社會福利基金會
- Formation: 29 June 1995; 31 years ago
- Founded at: Kaohsiung
- Type: Nonprofit organization
- Headquarters: Taiwan
- Website: www.c-are-us.org.tw

Children Are Us Foundation (Chinese: 喜憨兒社會福利基金會; pinyin: Xǐhān'er Shèhuì Fúlì Jījīnhuì) is a charity for people with an intellectual disability in Taiwan. The goal for this organization is to inspire and promote the potential talent of people with intellectual disability or developmental disability. Children Are Us Foundation is a non-profit private organization (NPO) which provides long-term care and job training to people with Down syndrome, cerebral palsy, multiple dysfunction and other mental illnesses. It works on changing people's general perception, hoping people can understand and respect people with intellectual disability, instead of making fun of them or looking down on them. The principles of the organization are love, professionalism, and humanity. They advocate "self-support" of people with intellectual disability by providing adaptive technology and work opportunity so that they can live normal lives as others.

== History ==
The organization was founded by parents of people with intellectual disability in Kaohsiung, Taiwan, on 29 June 1995 as Children Are Us of Cultural and Educational Foundation. It was then recognized by the Ministry of the Interior in May 2001 and registered as Children Are Us Foundation for Social Welfare in October the same year.

== Business ==
"Children Are Us" is well known in Taiwan for operating bakeries and restaurants that employ individuals with intellectual disabilities. The first "Children Are Us" bakery opened in Kaohsiung in 1997. With the goal of enabling these individuals to become self-reliant and independent, the foundation underwent a transformative journey from care, to capacity-building, and finally to change. Through systematic support and training, the beneficiaries evolved from service recipients to service providers, from resource consumers to resource creators, and from marginalized members of society to integral members of the mainstream. Their warm and self-reliant image has helped change societal perceptions, making "Children Are Us" synonymous with "individuals with intellectual disabilities" in Taiwan.

As of 2024, there are 108 service points and programs located in Taipei City, New Taipei City, Taoyuan City, Hsinchu County/City, Tainan City, Kaohsiung City, and Pingtung City. The organization employs 600 full-time staff and 230 sheltered workers (persons with disabilities), and provides regular care for over 1,000 individuals each year, along with nearly 100 part-time employee. Additionally, they have established percussion groups and theater troupes that hold joint public performances annually.
