= Huang Chi-min =

Taiwanese fire service official

Huang Chi-min (born April 4, 1952) is a Taiwanese fire service official who served as Director-General of the National Fire Agency from 2003 to 2009.

Between 2002 and 2006, Huang accepted NT$19.24 million in bribes in connection with nine procurement projects, including the UH-1H Helicopter Dispatch and Monitoring System. He was detained in 2012 after the case was uncovered and was widely referred to by the media as “the most corrupt Director-General in the history of the Fire Agency.”

== Biography ==
Huang Chi-min's father was a senior police official who retired from the force in the early years.

Huang graduated from Taichung First Senior High School in 1969. He holds a bachelor's degree from the Central Police University, a master's degree in humanities from the Graduate Institute of Life-and-Death Studies at Nanhua University, and pursued doctoral studies at the Graduate Institute of Crime Prevention, Central Police University.

On September 1, 2004, he was awarded the First Outstanding Alumni Award by the Central Police University.

Huang is married to Chen Su-hsia.

=== Career ===
- Squad Leader and Deputy Platoon Leader, Fire Brigade, Taipei City Fire Department
- Security Police Captain, Daan Precinct, Taipei City Police Department
- Head of Logistics Section, 4th Special Police Corps, National Police Agency
- Director, Preparatory Office, College of Disaster Prevention and Rescue, Central Police University
- Deputy Director-General and Director-General, National Fire Agency, Ministry of the Interior

== Corruption case ==
Between 2002 and 2006, Huang Chi-min accepted NT$19.24 million in bribes through nine procurement projects, including the UH-1H Helicopter Dispatch and Monitoring System and the Disaster-Relief Satellite Communication System and On-Site Command Vehicle Integration Project.

During the 2009 Typhoon Morakot disaster response, communication systems implicated in Huang's corruption case malfunctioned. During the same period, Huang served as deputy commander of the Central Emergency Operations Center, and suddenly collapsed while reporting to then Vice Premier Paul Chiu and was rushed to hospital. President Ma Ying-jeou immediately visited him, which earned Huang a public reputation as a “disaster-relief hero.”

Huang later applied for retirement on health grounds, which was approved, with Interior Minister Jiang Yi-huah adding the note: “Reluctantly approved. Please rest and recover in peace; take care for the nation.”

In 2012, Huang was suspected of corruption during his tenure and was detained incommunicado. On the morning of August 29, 2012, prosecutors conducted a search of Huang’s luxury residence in Xinyi District, Taipei, seizing 30 to 40 imported luxury brand handbags and 19 gold bars weighing 16 kilograms in total.

In March 2005, the Fire Agency purchased, under the name of “disaster command vehicles,” one LEXUS LS430 sedan and one LEXUS LX470 SUV through Hotai Motor Co. The LS430 sedan was never dispatched even once and remained parked at the Fire Agency for half a year. The LX470 SUV, with a market price of NT$3.15 million, was used as Huang's personal vehicle under the guise of an official command vehicle.

Of the four “Disaster-Relief Satellite Communication System and On-Site Command Vehicle Integration Projects” handled during Huang’s tenure, only the first project in 2004 was publicly tendered. The subsequent three expansion procurements were changed to restricted tendering, with Taiwan International Standard Electronic Co., Ltd. as the sole bidder. The final awarded prices differed from the Fire Agency’s budget by only NT$7,000.

Fire service insiders noted that Huang was highly skilled in networking and ingratiation, earning favor with superiors and reliably completing assigned tasks. He possessed strong communication and coordination skills and was considered a public-relations-type leader. He also used his authority to expand connections with political and business figures. During his tenure, rumors of bribery circulated, and some frontline firefighters even nicknamed him “the businessman.”

Other colleagues stated that Huang was diligent, often leaving home early for work and bringing official documents home to work overtime. However, he exercised authoritarian leadership, imposed strict demands on subordinates, sometimes monitored their office work, and showed no tolerance toward those who failed to meet expectations. A former subordinate testified that Huang was a “harsh official.”

Some media reports claimed that Huang was a favored subordinate of a former Taiwan Solidarity Union heavyweight. Former legislator Chiu Yi also stated that Huang was heavily promoted to Director-General by Huang Kun-huei, who had served as Minister of the Interior during a Kuomintang administration.

Huang Kun-huei denied knowing Huang Chi-min or having heard of him during his term as minister, and filed a lawsuit with the Taipei District Court demanding that Chiu Yi apologize and compensate for reputational damage.

Other media reported that Legislative Yuan President Wang Jin-pyng had also strongly recommended Huang, indicating his extensive political and business connections. After the scandal broke, Huang’s son Huang Yu-sheng remained overseas and delayed returning to Taiwan. Huang Yu-sheng had previously served multiple times as a volunteer at Ma Ying-jeou’s presidential campaign headquarters. Prosecutors alleged that he secretly assisted his father in laundering money overseas, and after exiting to mainland China, eventually fled to the United States.

On December 25, 2012, the Taipei District Prosecutors Office concluded its investigation, determining that Huang Chi-min accepted NT$19.24 million in bribes through nine procurement projects between 2002 and 2006. Prosecutors indicted 12 individuals, including Huang Chi-min, his elder brother Huang Wen-chou, Fire Agency officials, and contractors, on charges of corruption, illegal profiteering, bribery, money laundering, document forgery, and violations of the Government Procurement Act. Those indicted included Huang Chi-min, Huang Wen-chou, Fire Agency inspectors Tsai Mu-huo and Du Wang-tao, Air Service Corps section chief Wang Chi-tung, former Air-Firefighting technician Chang Jui-yuan, former Fire Agency officer Lo Tsai-chuan, and contractors Wang Jing-wu, Lu Chong-guang, Chung Su-mei, Chiu Tsang-min, and Hsu Hui-teng. Huang's son Huang Yu-sheng was also suspected of assisting in laundering approximately NT$60 million and was wanted by prosecutors. Additional charges were brought against Huang in May 2013. Huang returned to Taiwan in September 2013 and was later not prosecuted due to insufficient evidence. Prior to Huang Chi-min's formal impeachment by the Control Yuan, Huang Wen-chou, Lo Tsai-chuan, and businessman Wang Ching-wu returned the bribes they had received.

On July 3, 2017, after more than five years of trial, the Taipei District Court convicted Huang Chi-min in the first instance of nine counts of bribery, two counts of money laundering, and additional charges including illegal profiteering and document forgery. He was sentenced to 18 years’ imprisonment, deprived of civil rights for eight years, and ordered to forfeit NT$20.76 million in illicit gains.

Huang appealed the ruling. On April 8, 2022, the High Court found him guilty of six counts of bribery, two counts of money laundering, two counts of illegal profiteering, and one count of document forgery, reducing his sentence to 16 years' imprisonment with eight years’ deprivation of civil rights. The case is currently under third-instance review. The Supreme Court ruled on Huang's case in February 2026, finding that he was guilty on seven charges of corruption, but permitting a retrial for four other charges.

Huang also filed a civil lawsuit against then Fire Agency Chief Secretary Yeh Ji-tang and an inspector surnamed Tseng, alleging that they committed perjury and damaged his reputation by shifting responsibility entirely onto him during testimony, seeking NT$9 million in damages. The Taipei District Court ruled against Huang, and the High Court upheld the ruling in 2020. The case remains under appeal.

== Honors ==
=== Decorations of the Republic of China ===
Third-Class Order of Merit (awarded by the Executive Yuan on October 27, 2009).
