= Huang Hsien-chou =

Taiwanese politician (born 1959)

- 黃顯洲

Member of the Legislative Yuan
- In office 1 February 1999 – 31 January 2002
- Constituency: Taichung

Personal details
- Born: 28 February 1959 (age 67) East District, Taichung, Taiwan
- Party: Kuomintang
- Relations: Sean Liao (nephew)
- Education: National Taiwan University (BS); Illinois Institute of Technology (MS)

Huang Hsien-chou (Chinese: 黃顯洲; born 28 February 1959) is a Taiwanese engineer and politician. He served in the Legislative Yuan from 1999 to 2002.

== Education ==
Huang attended three primary schools—Chengkung, Lishin, and Kaungfu—and graduated from the Jujen Middle School and the Provincial Taichung First High School, all in his native Taichung, before enrolling at National Taiwan University, where he graduated with a Bachelor of Science (B.S.) in agricultural engineering. In 1985, Huang earned a master's degree in engineering management from the Illinois Institute of Technology.

== Career ==
Huang was employed by the Taiwan Provincial Government as an engineer and consultant, and served on the second convocation of the National Assembly. He was also a member of Taichung's urban development association, as well as the agricultural and hydraulic affairs association, and an evaluator for the Construction and Planning Agency, a division of the Ministry of the Interior. He held lectureships at Tunghai University and the China College of Engineering and Commerce.

In 1998, Huang was elected to the Legislative Yuan as a Kuomintang representative of Taichung City, and also served the Legislative Yuan's Sci-tech and Information Committee as member and convenor. In September 2001, he published the results of a review into the use of hands-free mobile phone accessories, such as earpieces. Huang lost reelection in December 2001. That same year, he had also participated in primaries to determine the Kuomintang's candidate for the Taichung mayoralty, a position that would be contested during the local elections.

During a press conference on 2 January 2002, Huang claimed that he had been kidnapped between 27 and 31 December 2001, and that his captors drugged, restrained, and stole NT$800,000 from him. Tsai Hsiang-chun led the investigation into the case, which involved escort Chan Hui-hua, businessman Yu Hung-tsan, and later, Chan's brother Chan Fu-shun. Chan Hui-hua claimed that Huang hired her and other women for a sadomasochistic sex party at the Grand Hyatt Taipei, and Chan Fu-shun stated that he had watched Huang take marijuana and MDMA. Chan Hui-hua and Yu Hung-tsan were indicted in April 2001, and Huang made his first testimony to the Taipei District Court that June. Legal proceedings lasted five years, and ended with the Supreme Court sentencing Chan Hui-hua to seven years and six months imprisonment and Yu Hung-tsan to seven years imprisonment.

== Personal life ==
Huang Hsien-chou is married to Wang Liang-yue. His sister Huang Chiao-ling was killed by a drunk driver in 2012. Another sister, Huang Hsin-hui, has served on the Taichung City Council. His nephew is Sean Liao.
