= Construction industry in Taiwan =

The construction industry is one of the major industry sectors in the economy of Taiwan, contributing about 3.3% of Taiwan's gross domestic product (GDP) in 2021. Its history is one that mirrors closely the overall economic path of the country, from building of the Fort Zeelandia in Tainan during Dutch Formosa, through economic modernization under Japanese colonial rule, and until today with the recovery and great economic expansion of Taiwan's post-war years. Contemporary challenges include maintaining access to labor, health and safety, and combating political corruption.

== History ==
=== Dutch and Spanish Formosa ===
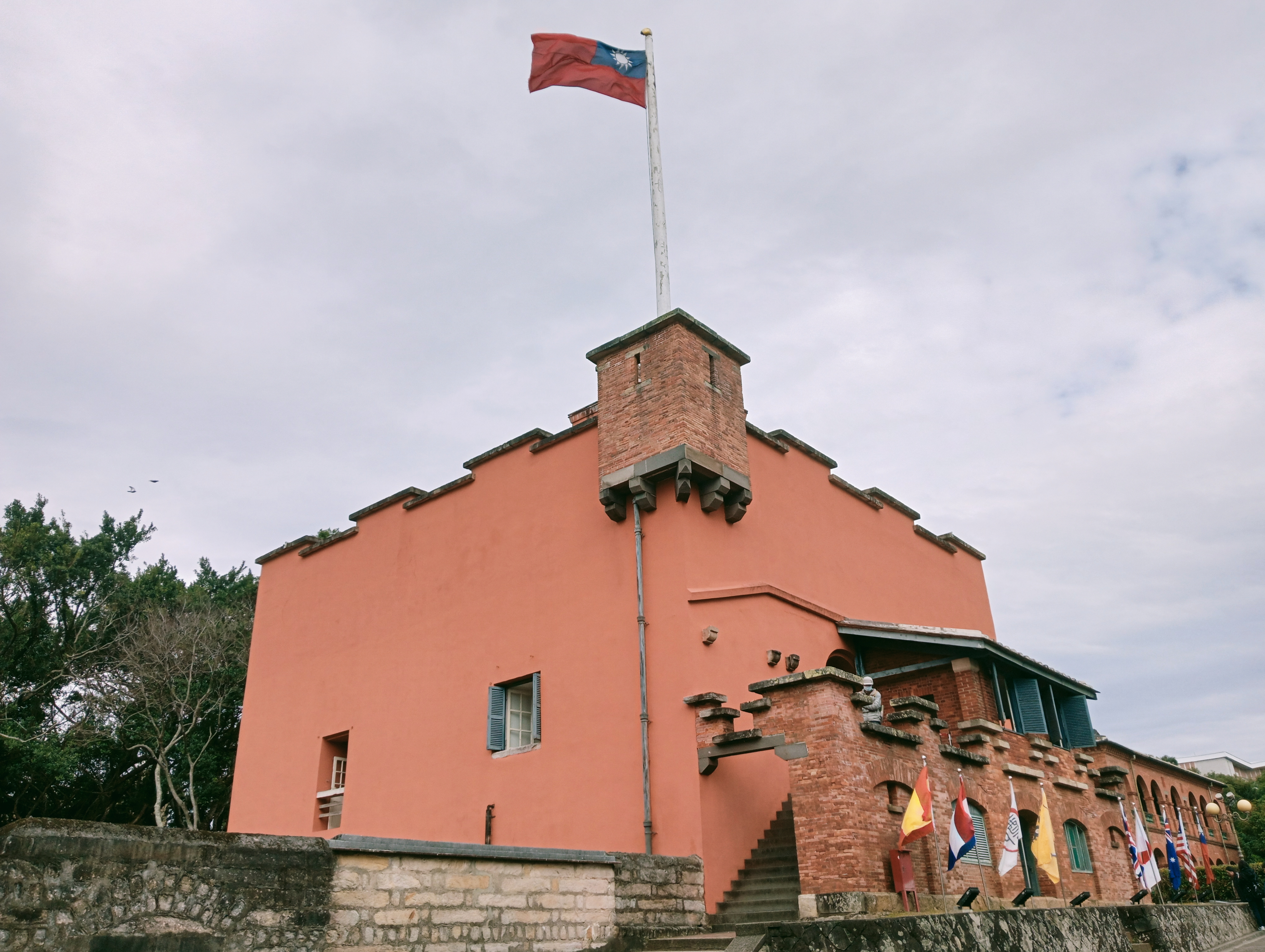
Fort Santo Domingo

The first physical record of a construction industry in Taiwan is Fort Zeelandia, a fortress built over ten years from 1624 to 1634 by the Dutch East India Company in Tainan. Around the same time, in northern Taiwan, the Fort Santo Domingo was completed in 1628 by the Manila-based Spanish East Indies of the Spanish Empire.

=== Qing rule ===
Under Qing rule, a telegraph line from Tainan to Tamsui was constructed in 1886–88 and a railway connecting Keelung, Taipei, and Hsinchu was built. These first efforts were met with mixed results. The telegraph line could only function in bursts of a week due to a difficult overland connection and the railway required an overhaul, serviced small rolling stock, and carried little freight.

=== Japanese colonial rule ===
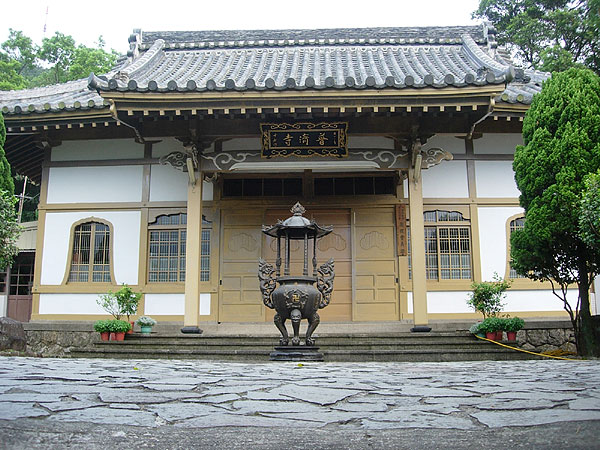
The old Tetsuma-in (now Puji Temple in Beitou, Taipei), constructed during Japanese rule

During the Japanese colonial period, a total of 72 cities and towns were planned in Taiwan, with a total area of about 52,500 ha (130,000 acres) and a total planned population of about 3.26 million. During this period, cities like Taipei were redesigned into colonial administrative centers, featuring monumental civic buildings and axial avenues, wide boulevards, grid layouts, and civic spaces inspired by Tokyo's urban form. The previous narrow and winding roads and poor sanitary environment were replaced by wide and straight roads, roundabouts, parks and other public facilities, as well as the standardization of building settings.

The Japanese colonial government was responsible for building harbors and hospitals as well as constructing infrastructure like railroads and roads, followed by large scale irrigation facilities and power plants. The first rail station in Taipei was completed in Twatutia in October 1891, when the railway to Keelung was opened for service. The branch line from Taihoku (Taipei) to Tamsui was completed in June 1901, and Daitotei Station (Japanese: 大稻埕驛) (大稻埕車站) opened as part of the then TRA Tamsui Line. However, it was closed to passenger service in 1916 and continued to operate as a freight-only station until its eventual closure in 1937.

By 1935 the Japanese expanded the roads by 4,456 km (2,769 mi), in comparison with the 164 km (102 mi) that existed before the colonial period. The Japanese government invested a lot of money in the sanitation system of the island. These campaigns against rats and unclean water supplies contributed to a decrease of diseases such as cholera and malaria.

=== Post-war era ===
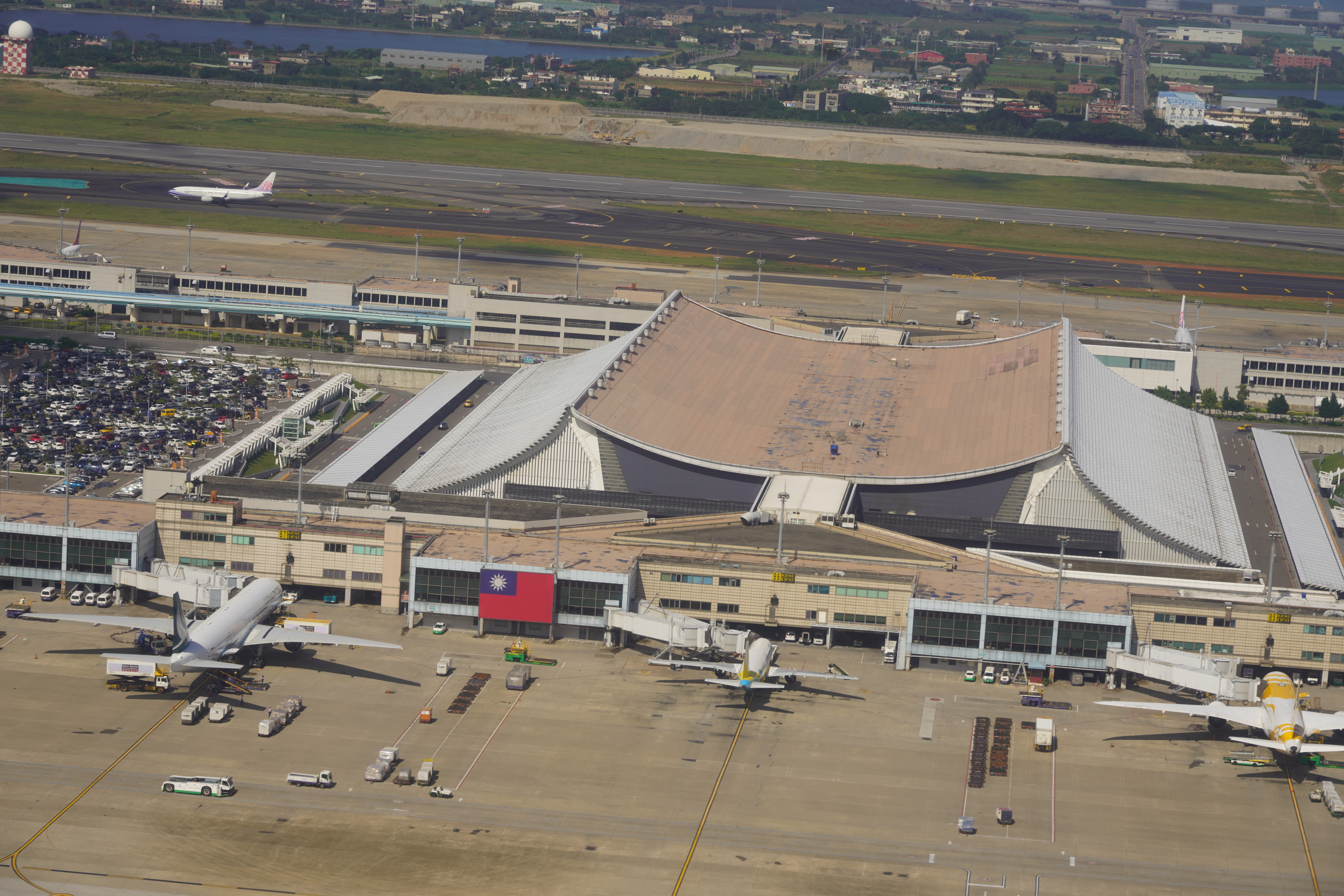
Taoyuan Airport Terminal 1

Between 1974 and 1979, the Taiwanese government invested over NT$300 billion a project called the Ten Major Construction Projects, which included highways, ports, Taiwan's first nuclear power plant, shipyards, petrochemical plants, as well as railway electrification. One of the most notable project during this period is Taoyuan Airport, which was built in order to replace overcrowded Songshan Airport. Terminal 1 of the airport began service in 1979, catalyzing regional development and fueling significant knock-on effects in logistics and tourism of Taiwan. According to data from the Directorate General of Budget, Accounting and Statistics, following the commencement of construction on National Freeway 1 in 1971, Taiwan's economic growth rate stood at 1.16% in 1974, with industrial growth at -4.5% and inflation at 47.5%; by 1976, the economic growth rate soared to 13.86%, with industrial growth at 24.4% and inflation at 2.48%.

== Contemporary features ==
=== Economic impact ===
During the post-pandemic tech manufacturing boom, Taiwan's construction industry experienced rapid expansion, recording a compound annual growth rate (CAGR) of 6.1% between 2020 and 2024 due to massive factory fabrications. By the first quarter of 2026, gross domestic product (GDP) from the construction sector reached NT$187 billion.

The market is generally split between public works and high-density private developments, with residential high-rises and commercial complexes dominating metropolitan areas like Greater Taipei, Taichung, and Kaohsiung. Demand in the residential sector is supported by a high domestic homeownership rate of nearly 85%.

Taiwan's construction sector is dominated by non-residential construction, including semiconductor fabs and commercial spaces. While the market itself is highly fragmented with over 40,000 licensed contractors, smaller firms rarely handle major national civil engineering. Massive projects like highway expansions, flood prevention systems, and mass transit lines typically go to state-affiliated contractors or giant conglomerates. Historically, the industry sees its sharpest growth surges immediately following major economic stimulus packages or post-disaster rebuilding efforts.

=== Sustainability ===
Energy efficiency and reducing greenhouse gas emissions is a goal of the Taiwanese government, which has resulted in national standards for energy usage, such as the "Climate Change Response Act", the "Energy Management Act", and national energy efficiency and greenhouse gas reduction goals, as well as emissions standards set by local governments, which includes building energy efficiency rules and requirements for renewable energy or solar photovoltaic installations. There have also been technological approaches, including prefabricated houses produced with minimal CO_{2} emissions or more energy efficient construction materials. According to an article by GlobeNewswire, the country's prefabricated construction market is forecasted to grow by 4.8% year over year, reaching NTD63.5 billion in 2026.

=== Health and safety ===
Following historical structural updates, Taiwan's modern building codes enforce rigorous seismic standards that mandate features such as base isolation and structural redundancy, alongside mandatory retrofitting programs for older builds. Industry safety and labor regulations are overseen by the Ministry of Labor's Occupational Safety and Health Administration (OSHA), which focuses regulatory enforcement on on-site risk reduction, specifically targeting fall prevention, machinery compliance, and mandatory worker safety training.

=== Corruption ===
There are a number of interactions between the Taiwanese construction industry and its government that can be construed as corrupt. Observers note that companies have given political contributions or bribes to the government, particularly in the past when it was actively instituting protective measures or incentives to encourage industrial development. Very common especially in construction is wéibiāo (圍標) or "bid rigging" to arbitrarily raise project costs, enriching contractors at the expense of taxpayers.

=== Notable companies ===
In 2018, the construction industry in Taiwan included 131,243 employees working for 15,487 companies, according to data from the National Land Management Agency. Five major vertically integrated firms with extensive operations both domestically and overseas:

- CTCI Group
- Continental Engineering Corporation
- Ruentex Development
- BES Engineering Corporation
- DA CIN Construction

== See also ==
- Economy of Taiwan
- Architecture of Taiwan
- Transportation in Taiwan
- Ministry of Transportation and Communications (Taiwan)
- Ministry of the Interior (Taiwan)
