= Conscription in Taiwan =

Taiwan, officially the Republic of China (ROC), maintains an active conscription system in accordance with the regulations set by the government of the Republic of China. All qualified male citizens of military age in the country are obligated to perform 1 year on active duty military service or receive 4 months of military training.

In the early history of Taiwan, armed forces were composed of military volunteers. Conscription was first enforced in Taiwan in January 1945, the final year of Japanese colonial rule. The Government-General of Taiwan forcibly drafted Taiwanese people to join the Imperial Japanese Army (IJA) and Navy (IJN) to fight on in World War II. After the Surrender of Japan, the government of the Republic of China which occupied Taiwan as the representative of the Allied Forces in 1945, restarted conscription in Taiwan in December 1949 just after losing the Chinese Civil War on the mainland and retreating to the island. Duration of compulsory military service for all Taiwanese male citizens ranged between 2 and 3 years in the 2nd half of the 20th century.

In the 2000s, the government of the Republic of China were aiming for an all volunteer military. Duration of compulsory military service were reduced gradually from 2 years in 2000 to 1 year in 2008. In addition, an alternative civilian service system, called the substitute service, was also established in 2000. In the 2010s, the government made further progress for an all volunteer military goal to end the mandatory military service. A separate military training scheme was implemented in 2013, which has a duration of about 4 months. The transition from active duty military service to military training was done in late 2018. Starting 2019, most personnel of Republic of China Armed Forces were largely military volunteers.

But since 2017, the rapid deterioration of People's Republic of China–United States relations has made a concern that the PRC may seek to finalize the current ambiguous status quo of Taiwan Strait dating back to the 1940s with its People's Liberation Army (PLA). In December 2022, the government of the Republic of China announced an reinstatement of the mandatory 1 year long active duty military service from January 2024.

== History ==
=== Early years ===
Early ruling regimes of Taiwan, such as Dutch East India Company, Spanish Empire, Kingdom of Tungning, Qing Empire, and Republic of Formosa, maintained their own armed forces in Taiwan from recruiting military volunteers from Taiwanese people (including Taiwanese indigenous peoples) or from outside Taiwan.

=== Japanese rule ===
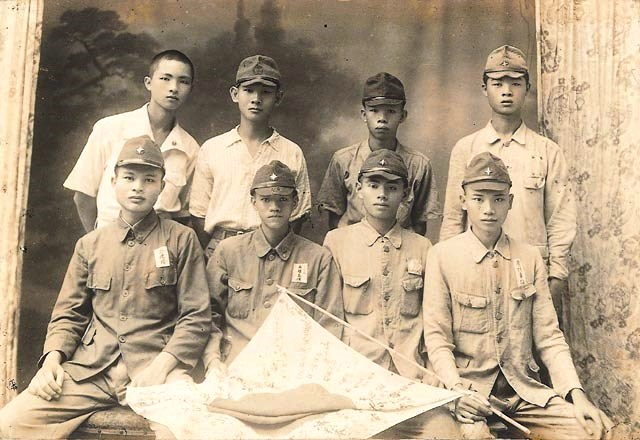
Taiwanese Imperial Japan Serviceman

Since the beginning of the Second Sino-Japanese War in 1937, the Government-General of Taiwan recruited Taiwanese military volunteers to serve in the Imperial Japanese Army and Navy. The 1941 Japanese attack on Pearl Harbor has made the war between Japan and China up to a full scale World War II. As the war beak, the Government-General of Taiwan set up several military recruiting programs for Taiwanese people to join the military, including

- Takasago Volunteers (高砂義勇隊, Takasago Giyūtai) (since 1942, for Taiwanese indigenous peoples),
- Army Special Volunteer System (陸軍特別志願兵制度, Rikugun tokubetsu shiganhei) (since 1942, for joining the Imperial Japanese Army), and
- Navy Special Volunteer System (海軍特別志願兵制度, Kaigun tokubetsu shiganhei) (since 1943, for joining the Imperial Japanese Navy).

Finally, conscription was performed in Taiwan from January 1945, until the surrender of Japan in August 1945.

From 1937 to 1945, over 207,183 Taiwanese people served in the Imperial Japanese military, including 80,433 on active duty and 126,750 civilian employees.

=== After World War II ===
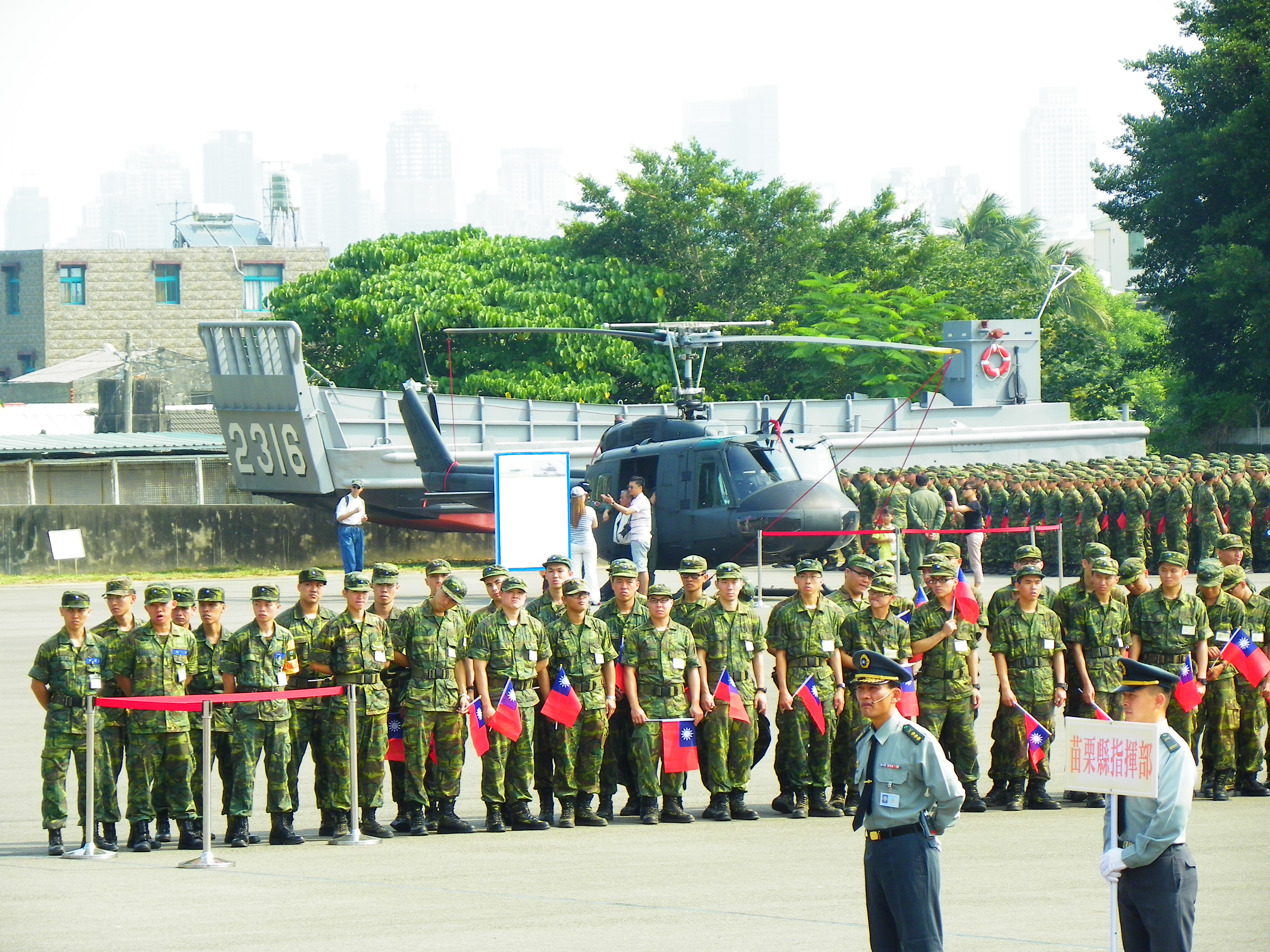
A group of recruits prior to entering the ROCA.

In August 1945, after World War II, the Republic of China (ROC) occupied Taiwan as the representative of the Allied Forces. In February 1946, Chen Yi, the Kuomintang-affiliated governor of Taiwan Province, considered sending Taiwanese troops to fight in the Chinese Civil War. Local Taiwanese refused to go to China, informing Chen they would defend Taiwan while the Kuomintang forces occupying Taiwan should return to and defend China. After losing the civil war, the Government of the Republic of China completed its retreat to Taiwan in December 1949. Mandatory conscription was introduced in Taiwan in December 1949 to prevent possible invasion from the Chinese Communist Party-led People's Republic of China (PRC). The first conscription order issued in Taiwan under Republic of China rule after the introduction of mandatory military service was dated 25 July 1951.

In the 1950s, the government enacted significant amendments to the Act of Military Service System (兵役法) to modernize the conscription system in Taiwan. The amended Act has clarified the male citizens shall be on two to three years of active duty in the Armed Forces depends on the branches (two years for Army, three years for Navy, Air Force, Marine Corps). The amended Act also created a system for the Ministry of National Defense to select reserved officers (預備軍官) and reserved non-commissioned officer (預備士官) from regular male citizens to extend the military mobilization ability. This situation was created due to geopolitics under the Cold War and remained unchanged until the late 1980s.

=== Democratization ===
Taiwan announced the lifting of martial law in 1987 and implemented a full scale democratization in the 1990s. The conscription policy was reviewed at this period. At the time, the majority of all enlisted positions in the Republic of China Armed Forces (ROCAF) were filled by draftees which served two years on active duty. As the national defense policy has changed, the duration of mandatory service has also been reduced. From two years in 1990 down to one year and ten months in 2000. Between 2004 and 2008, the period of conscription continued to be reduced by two months per year until a total of one year remained in 2008.

In the 2000s, there was also an increase in service options open to draftees, including alternative civilian service system, called Substitute service, with the Ministry of the Interior (MOI), as well as specialized service options for draftees in specific professions. The National Conscription Agency has also been established under MOI to administrates the raft process is set forth by the Act of Military Service System. Alternative military service members participate in civil defense activities.

=== Transition to all-volunteer military forces ===
In 2007, the Ministry of National Defense had announced that should voluntary enlistment reach sufficient numbers, the compulsory service period for draftees will be shortened to 14 months. It will be further shortened to 12 months in 2009.

On 10 March 2009, Minister of Defense Chen Chao-min said by the end of 2014, the country will have an all-volunteer military force. The process of removing conscription will begin in 2010 and by the end of 2014 an all volunteer force will replace the conscripts. Individuals who wish to join must have a minimum of high school education and those who do not volunteer for the military will be required to complete four months of military boot camp.

In 2012, it was reported that from 2013 on, military draftees born after 1 January 1994, will only need to receive four months of military training and will no longer be required to serve one year of military service, and that the government was on track to replace all serving conscripts with volunteers by the end of 2014. However, this timetable was pushed back in 2013 to the end of 2016. Ultimately, this plan was scrapped and plans for abolishing conscription were never brought up thereafter.

Service time for men born on or after 1 January 1994 was cut to four months in 2013. The last group of mandatory conscripts were discharged in December 2018. However, other sources says that conscription unofficially if not technically still exists as the transition to an all-volunteer force has been unsuccessful in recruiting enough volunteer soldiers to fulfill the defensive needs.

In January 2023, the Taiwanese Defense Ministry announced that it would allow women to volunteer for reserve force training, amid an increase of military pressure from China. The Defense Ministry stated that it only trained male reservists because it only had sufficient capacity to accommodate men. Taiwanese lawmakers claimed excluding women from reserve training amounted to gender discrimination.

=== Resumption of active duty conscription ===
Since 2017, the rapid deterioration of People's Republic of China–United States relations has made a concern that China may seek to change the status quo of Taiwan Strait with its People's Liberation Army (PLA).

In December 2022, President Tsai Ing-wen announced the extension of compulsory military service to one year from four months from 2024, returning to the duration of conscription from 2008 to 2013, citing the rising military threat from the People's Liberation Army (PLA) of the People's Republic of China (PRC).

== Statutory framework ==
Military service is defined as a duty of citizens in the Article 20 of the Constitution of the Republic of China: "The people shall have the duty of performing military service in accordance with law." The Act of Military Service System (兵役法) and the Enforcement Act of Act of Military Service System (兵役法施行法) provide details of the country's military service system and procedures to conduct conscription in Taiwan.

In the regulations the conscription is handled jointly by the Ministry of the Interior and the Ministry of National Defense. The National Conscription Agency was created under the Ministry of the Interior in 2002 to administrate the conscription in Taiwan.

== Types of military service ==
In accordance with the Law, male citizens achieved conscription age on the next 1 January after his 18th birthday. Conscription age male citizens are required to report its basic profiles the and attend conscription physical examination. Qualified conscription age male citizens may serve in the following types of military service to fulfill the statutory obligation.

Type		Notes
Reserved officer service (預備軍官役)		The Ministry of National Defense conducted test each year to select reserved officers and reserved non-commissioned officers from conscription age male citizens with a four-year college degree.; Implemented from 1952 to 2018, admitted reserved officers and reserved non-commissioned officers perform active service for a duration equal to Standing Soldier Active Service.; To resume in 2024 with the reinstatement of mandatory 1-year active duty military service.
Reserved non-commissioned officer service (預備士官役)		The Ministry of National Defense conducted test each year to select reserved officers and reserved non-commissioned officers from conscription age male citizens with a four-year college degree.; Implemented from 1952 to 2018, admitted reserved officers and reserved non-commissioned officers perform active service for a duration equal to Standing Soldier Active Service.; To resume in 2024 with the reinstatement of mandatory 1-year active duty military service.
Standing soldier service (常備兵役)	Active service (現役)	Qualified conscription age male citizens drafted for 1 year active duty in the Armed Forces.; Drafted from January 1956 to December 2018, with duration varies from 1 to 3 years depends on regulations.; To resume in 2024, for conscription age male citizens born on or after 1 January 2005.
Standing soldier service (常備兵役)	Military training (軍事訓練)	Qualified conscription age male citizens drafted to receive 4 months of military training.; Drafted since January 2013, for conscription age male citizens born on or after 1 January 1994.; Fully implemented since January 2019.; To resume active conscription in 2024, conscription age male citizens born on or after 1 January 2005 no longer qualified for 4-month military training.
Replacement soldier service (補充兵役)		Conscription age male citizens who with special family factors or who are national team athletes determined not suitable to perform Standing Soldier Service.; Draftees receive 12 days of simplified military training
Substitute service (替代役)		Conscription age male citizens who with religious factors, family factors, selected occupational expertise, or who classified to serve substitute service by the physical examination.; Drafted since August 2000.; Draftees serve in the governmental agencies for a duration equal to or longer than the Standing Soldier Active Service.; There are also special programs like Research and Development Substitute Services or Industry Reserve Substitute Service which allows draftees to serve in selected companies or semi-governmental organizations.

After completing the service period required by law, the conscription age male citizens are transformed into military reserve force. Male citizens performed Standing Soldier Service has their conscription age end and discharged in the next 1 January after their 36th birthday. However, male citizens performed in Reserved Officer and Non-Commissioned Officer Service has their conscription age end and discharged until they turned 50 in age.

In 2023, Taiwanese Ministry of the Interior estimated that the Research and Development Substitute Service program contributed NT$100 billion (US$3.19 billion) in value annually to the companies and organizations involved.

== Draft process ==
The military draft process occurs in four steps:

1. Military Registration Investigation: Interview conducted by the conscription sections of local government offices to determine the educational background of the draftee as well as any special skills (e.g. proficiency in a foreign language). Generally occurs upon a male ROC national's 19th birthday or periodically upon his establishment (or change) of residence in ROC administered territories while of draft age but not yet drafted. Education and other deferments may be granted at this point if the draftee is eligible. If the draftee is not eligible for a deferment, a physical examination is scheduled. The draftee may also apply for alternative or national defense service at this point. In the case of the latter, the draftee will be required to compete successfully at an officer selection board for the desired billet, after which he will continue directly on to officer training school following completion of the physical exam.
2. Physical Examination: Draftee undergoes a full physical examination at a hospital approved by the Department of Health. Physical fitness is classified on three levels, A, B, and C, with level A and B draftees considered physically fit for military service.
3. Drawing Lots: Draftees fit for military service then draw lots to determine if they will serve in the Army, Navy, Air Force, or Marine Corps (Military police officers are selected from Army draftees). The chances of drawing for each service are not equal with the Army generally being the most probable, the Navy intermediate, and the Air Force and Marines being the least probable.
4. Basic Training: After being assigned a service branch, the draftee is then assigned a date to begin basic training, after which the draftee will enter active duty.

== See also ==
- Military service
- National Conscription Agency
