= NLSC =

NLSC may refer to:

- National Land Surveying and Mapping Center
- National Language Service Corps
- National Leadership and Skills Conference
- Naval Legal Service Command
- Supreme Court of Newfoundland and Labrador
