= National Airborne Service Corps =

Taiwanese agency undertaking airborne non-military operations

Coordinates: 24.983751°N 121.541369°E

- 空中勤務總隊; Kōngzhōng Qínwù Zǒngduì (Mandarin); Khûng-chûng Khiùn-vu Chúng-chhui (Hakka)

Agency overview
- Formed: 10 March 2004
- Headquarters: Xindian, New Taipei, Taiwan
- Agency executive: Tung Chien-cheng, Director-General
- Parent agency: Ministry of the Interior
- Website: www.nasc.gov.tw

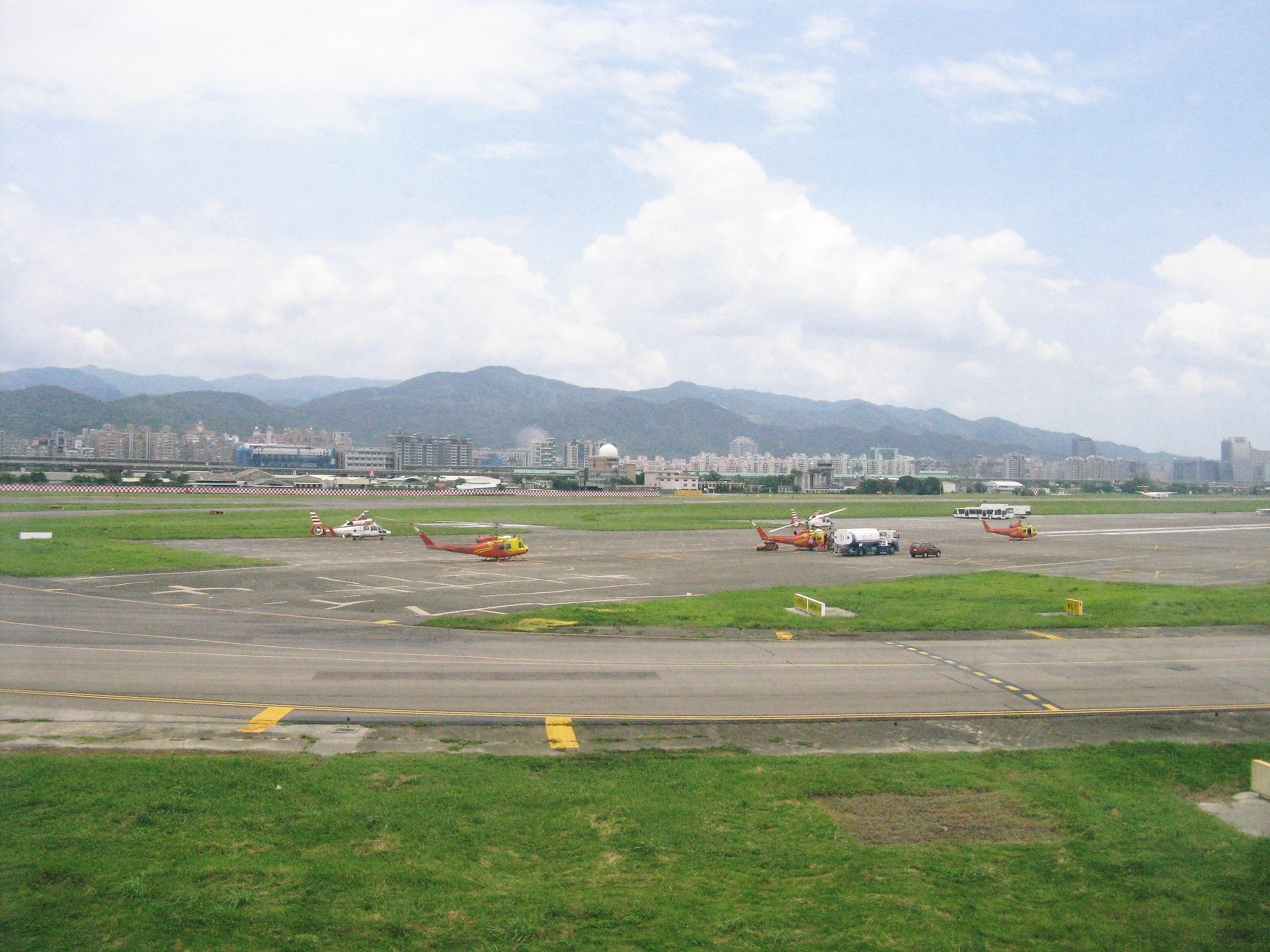
NASC helicopters at Taipei Songshan Airport. 19 July 2009

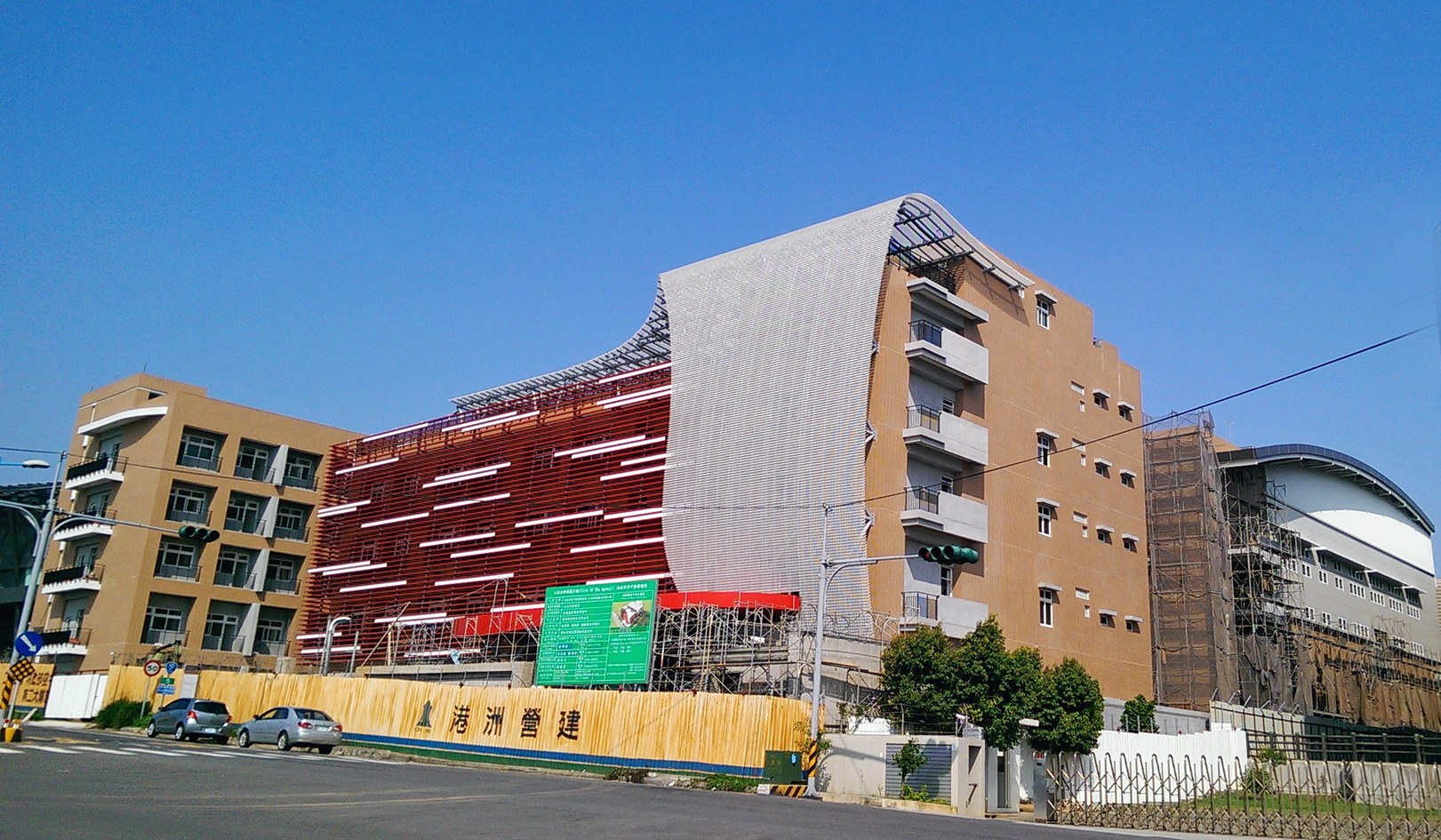
Second Brigade

The National Airborne Service Corps (NASC; traditional Chinese: 內政部空中勤務總隊; simplified Chinese: 内政部空中勤务总队; pinyin: Nèizhèngbù Kōngzhōng Qínwù Zǒngduì; Pe̍h-ōe-jī: Lāi-chèng-pō͘ Khong-tiong Khîn-bū Chóng-tūi) is the sole agency of the Republic of China (Taiwan) that operates aircraft and helicopters besides military and paramilitary units. The agency is responsible for executing and providing aerial support for search and rescue, disaster relief, emergency medical service, transportation, monitoring, reconnaissance and patrol.

== History ==
In July 2000, four workers employed by the government was stranded on a shoal of the Bazhang River when they are performing riverbed maintenance construction project and the flood strikes. Due to the bureaucracy of different authorities passing the buck, the workers were stranded for 3 hours and eventually overwhelmed by the flood. While the search and rescue personnel already arrived, they had no helicopter to fly, so they could do nothing but standing on the riverbanks, watching them drowning, and the whole situation was aired live on multiple news channels in Taiwan. The incident is known as the Bazhang River Incident (Chinese: 八掌溪事件). Due to the incompetence of bureaucracy, a unified authority was called to form.

Hence, NASC was formed with the merging of four distinct agencies, namely the Airborne Squadron of National Police Agency, the Preparatory Office of the Airborne Fire Fighting Squadron of National Fire Agency, the Aviation Team of Civil Aeronautics Administration of Ministry of Transportation and Communications, and the Air Patrol Squadron of the Coast Guard Administration on 10 March 2004.

In April 2020 a NASC AS-365 Dauphin helicopter crashed during a training exercise at Kaohsiung International Airport. All five crew members walked away from the crash.

In July 2020 the Taiwanese President announced a major pay raise for NASC pilots and smaller pay raises for NASC support staff in recognition of their dangerous profession and the benefit they bring to Taiwanese in need. According to the President NASC had rescued more than 7,100 people since its founding in 2004. Their contribution to wildfire fighting was also acknowledged.

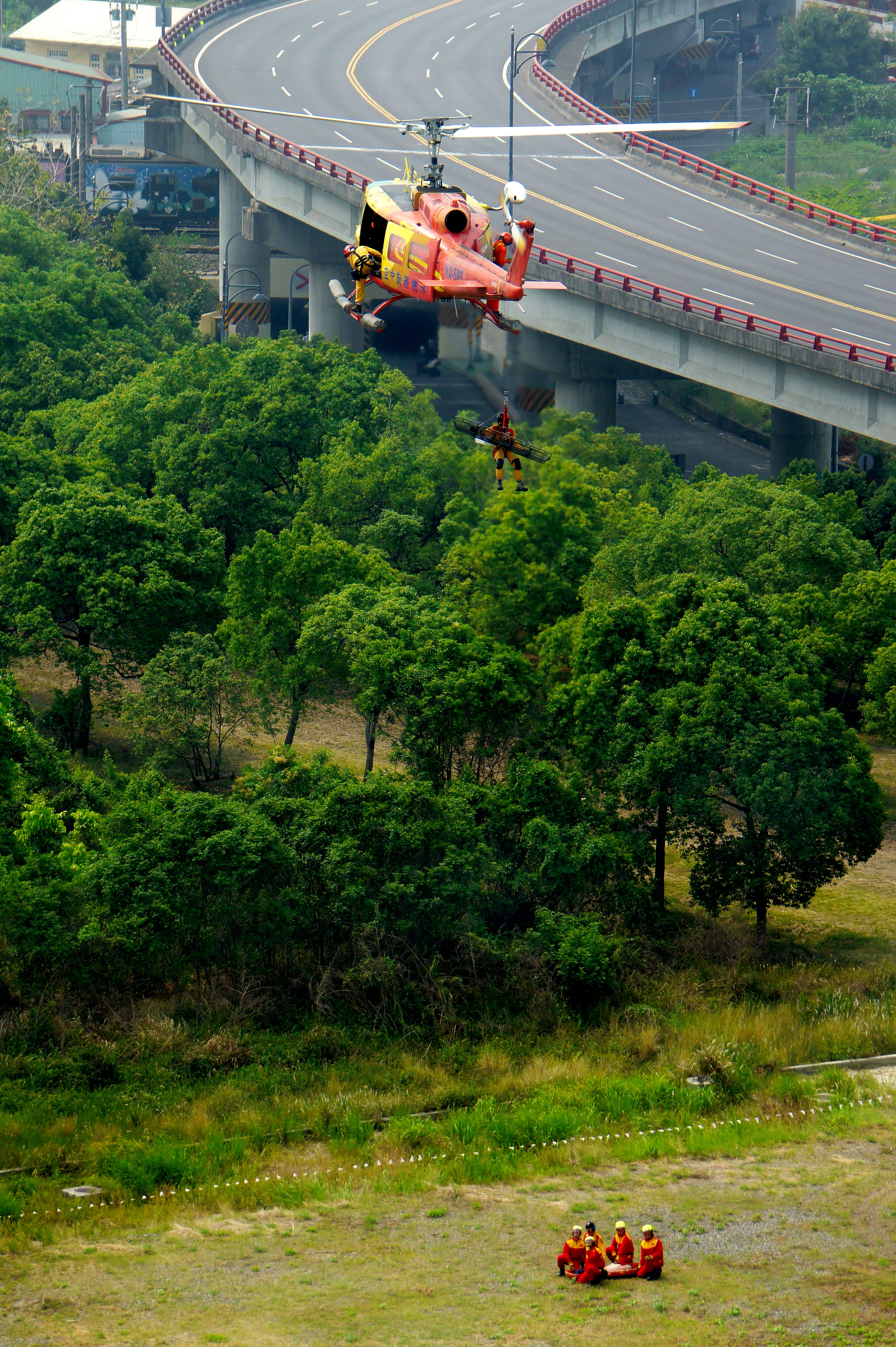
NASC UH-1H helicopter saw action in an air-raid drill in 2014

The NASC saw three times the rescue callouts in 2020 as 2019 due to increased domestic travel and hiking in mountain areas due to limits on international travel caused by the COVID-19 epidemic. An increase in the amount of land accessible to recreational hikers which coincided with the boom in hiking contributed to the high level of callouts. Given the high cost of rescue the NASC has begun to seek compensation from those with means who have to be rescued while hiking outside of legal hiking areas.

== Organizational structure ==
- Aviation Affairs Division
- Maintenance Division
- Duty Command Center
- Secretariat
- Personnel Office
- Accounting Office
- Civil Service Ethics Office
- Service Brigade

== Fleet ==
Between 2009-01-01 and 2019-12-31 the fleet racked up 75,746 flight hours over 56,366 sorties and effected 3,891 rescues.

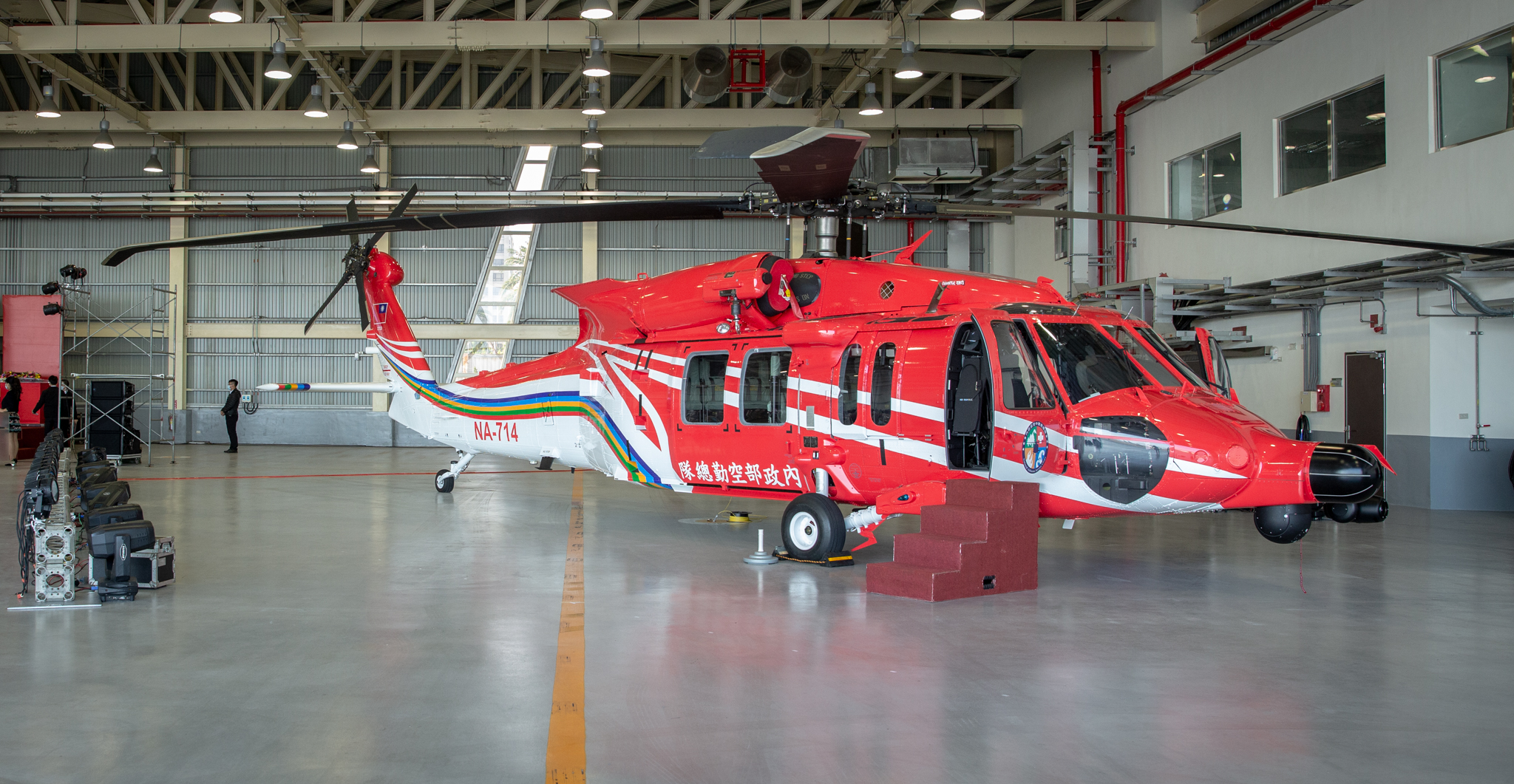
NASC UH-60M Black Hawk Helicopter

=== Current fleet ===
Aircraft	Origin	Type	Number	Remarks
AS365	France	medium-lift helicopter	8	8 in service; 4 crashed. For low-altitude missions.
Beech 200	United States	twin-turboprop aircraft	1	In active service. For aerial photograph and reconnaissance missions.
UH-60M	United States	medium-lift helicopter	14	14 in service; 1 crashed. For high-altitude missions. Transferred from the Armed Forces.

=== Retired Fleet ===
Aircraft	Origin	Type	Number	Remarks
BV234 MLR	United States	heavy-lift helicopter	0 (3)	All retired in 2015. For high-altitude missions.
S-76	United States	medium-lift helicopter	0 (12)	All retired. For low-altitude missions.
UH-1H	United States	medium-lift helicopter	0 (15)	All retired. For low-altitude missions.
Beech 350	United States	twin-turboprop aircraft	0 (1)	Retired in 2015. For aerial photograph and reconnaissance missions. The retirement is due to a belly landing accident in July 2015, rendering the aircraft too costly to repair.

== Fleet stations ==
=== North ===
- Taipei Songshan Airport (First Brigade)
- Hualien Airport (First Brigade)

=== Central ===
- Taichung Airport (Second Brigade)

=== South ===
- Tainan Airport (Third Brigade)
- Kaohsiung International Airport (Third Brigade)
- Taitung Airport (Third Brigade)

== Transportation ==
NASC headquarters office is accessible within walking distance North of Dapinglin MRT station of the Taipei Metro.

== See also ==
- Ministry of the Interior (Taiwan)
- Search and rescue
