= Central Emergency Operation Center =

Emergency operations center in Taiwan

- 中央災害應變中心
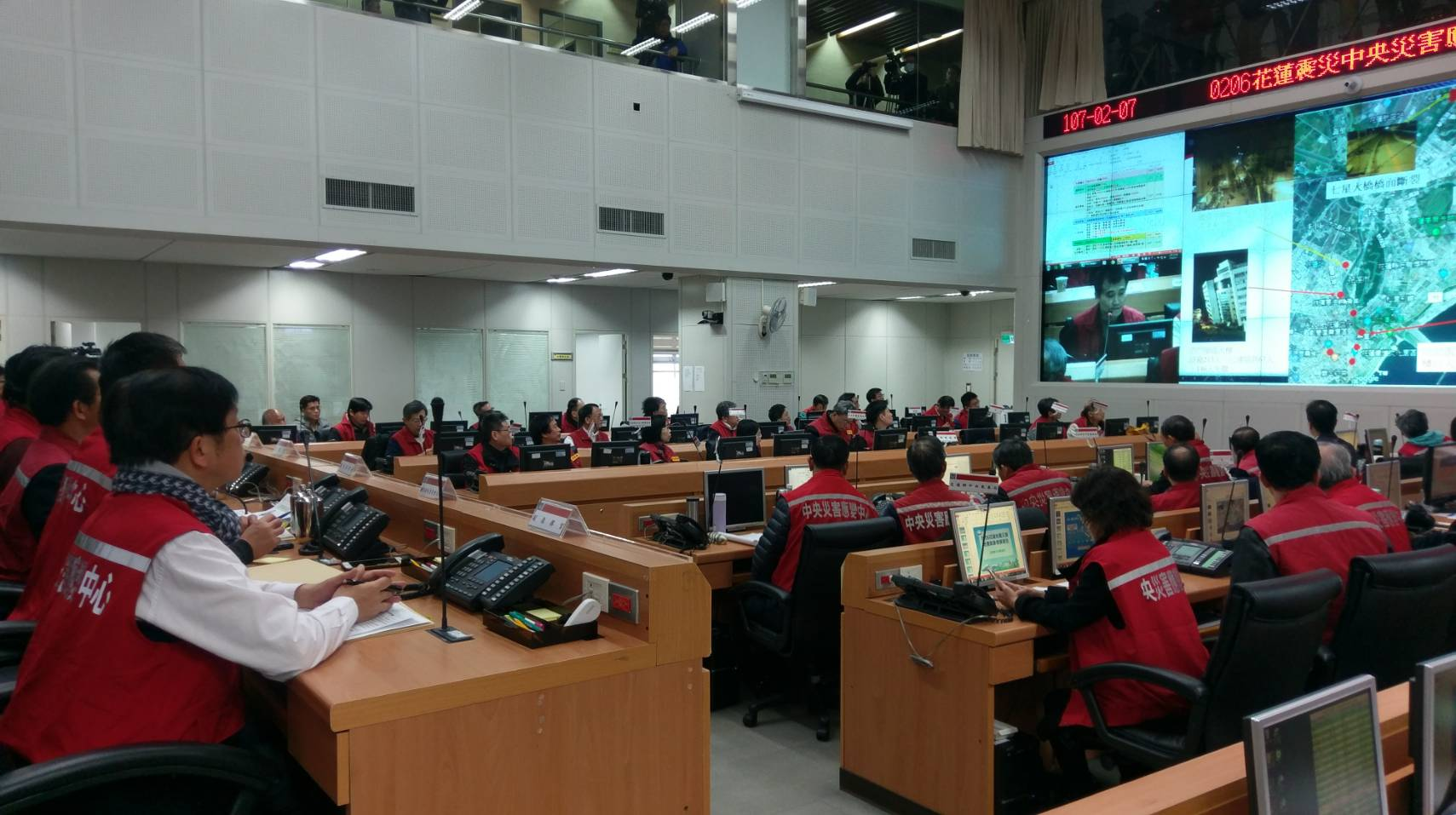

Agency overview
- Jurisdiction: Republic of China (Taiwan)
- Headquarters: New Taipei City
- Parent agency: National Fire Agency
- Website: Official website

The Central Emergency Operation Center (CEOC; traditional Chinese: 中央災害應變中心; simplified Chinese: 中央灾害应变中心; pinyin: Zhōngyāng Zāihài Yìngbiàn Zhōngxīn) is the emergency operations center of Taiwan which is activated in the event of an emergency. The center is operated by the National Fire Agency of the Ministry of the Interior.

== Levels ==
CEOC may be designated as a level-2 facility for lesser threats or as a level-1 facility for more severe threats.

== Types of disaster ==
The CEOC currently lists 14 types of disasters, which are typhoons, earthquakes/tsunamis, fires/explosions, floods, drought, oil and gas or power line breaks, extreme cold hazards, landslides, aviation disasters, disasters at sea, land traffic accidents, hazardous material disasters, mining disasters and forest fires.

== Backup centers ==
=== Northern Backup Center ===
Completed in February 2006, the center is located at Banqiao District, New Taipei.

=== Central Backup Center ===
Completed in December 2012, the center is located at Zhushan Township, Nantou County.

=== Southern Backup Center ===
Completed in December 2009, the center is located at Cianjhen District, Kaohsiung.

=== Official Southern Backup Center ===
Completed in December 2012, the center is located at Cianjhen District, Kaohsiung.

== See also ==
- National Fire Agency
