= Tainan City Fire Bureau Second Division =

Fire station in West Central, Tainan, Taiwan

- 台南市消防隊第二分隊
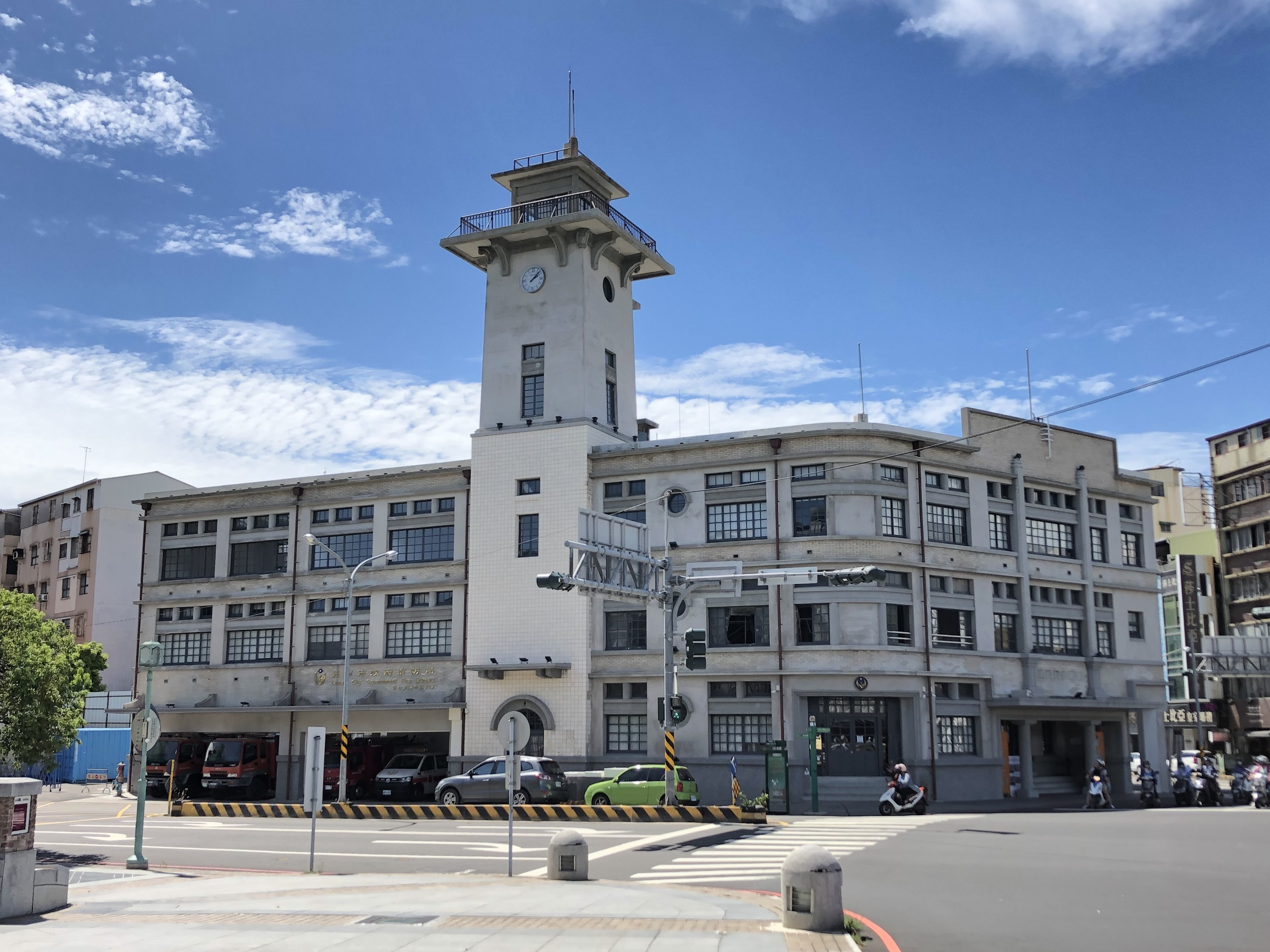
- Interactive map of the Tainan City Fire Bureau Second Division area

General information
- Type: fire station
- Location: West Central, Tainan, Taiwan
- Coordinates: 22°59′33.3″N 120°12′15.4″E
- Completed: 1938
- Client: National Fire Agency

Technical details
- Floor count: 3

The Tainan City Fire Bureau Second Division (traditional Chinese: 台南市消防隊第二分隊; simplified Chinese: 台南市消防队第二分队; pinyin: Táinán Shì Xiāofáng Duì Dìèr Fēnduì) is a fire station in West Central District, Tainan, Taiwan.

== History ==
The fire station building dates back to the time of Taiwan under Japanese rule. A fire lookout tower was built in 1930, as the tallest structure in Tainan city center at that time. Two wings were added in 1937-38, and the building was then renamed Tainan He Tong Building (Chinese: 台南合同廳舍), meaning Tainan Joint Government Offices: one wing housed the police headquarters and a kōban, while the other wing was (and still is) a fire station, with the oldest surviving fireman's pole in Taiwan. Since its inception, the building has undergone three renovations. The building was declared a historical monument in 1998.

== Architecture ==
The fire station building is an example of Japanese-Western Eclectic Architecture, consisting of a three-stories structure, with the fire lookout tower standing up to seven stories high.

== Transportation ==
The building is accessible within walking distance southwest of Tainan Station of Taiwan Railway.

== See also ==
- National Fire Agency
