= Sean Liao =

Taiwanese politician (born 1990)

Sean Liao Liao Wei-hsiang
- 廖偉翔
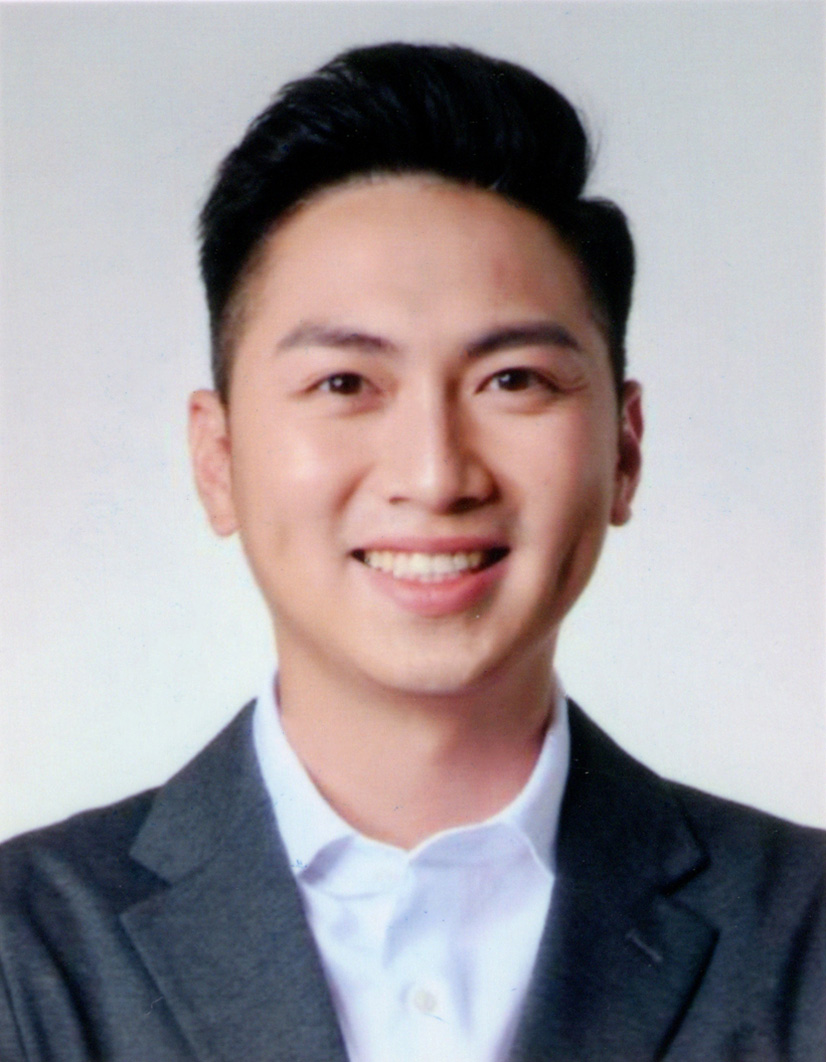
- Official portrait, 2024

Member of the Legislative Yuan
- Incumbent
- Assumed office 1 February 2024
- Preceded by: Chang Liao Wan-chien
- Constituency: Taichung 4

Spokesperson of the Kuomintang
- Incumbent
- Assumed office 27 July 2023
- Chairman: Eric Chu
- Preceded by: James Hsiao

Personal details
- Born: 6 July 1990 (age 36) Xitun, Taichung, Taiwan
- Party: Kuomintang
- Relations: Huang Hsien-chou (uncle)
- Parent: Huang Hsin-hui (mother)
- Education: Fu Jen Catholic University (BA)

Liao Wei-hsiang (Chinese: 廖偉翔; born 6 July 1990), also known by his English name Sean Liao, is a Taiwanese politician. He was elected to the Legislative Yuan in 2024.

== Early life and education ==
Liao was born on 6 July 1990 in Taichung, Taiwan. His mother, Huang Hsin-hui, is a Kuomintang politician who had served seven consecutive terms on the Taichung City Council by 2024. His maternal uncle, Huang Hsien-chou, also served as a KMT member of the Legislative Yuan.

Liao graduated from Fu Jen Catholic University with a bachelor's degree in business administration. As an undergraduate, he formed a band with classmates and served as its lead vocalist. He also performed publicly at the university's Zhongmei Hall.

== Political career ==
Liao began his political career as an aide to his mother, later worked for Jason Hu, then served the Kuomintang as a spokesperson.

Liao was endorsed by both the Kuomintang and Taiwan People's Party in the 2024 legislative election, and defeated the Democratic Progressive Party-affiliated incumbent Legislative Yuan member Chang Liao Wan-chien in Taichung.
