= Land Consolidation Engineering Bureau =

Republic of China government agency

- 土地重劃工程處; Tǔdì Zhònghuà Gōngchéng Chù (Mandarin); Thú-thi Chhùng-va̍k Kûng-chhàng Chhú (Hakka)
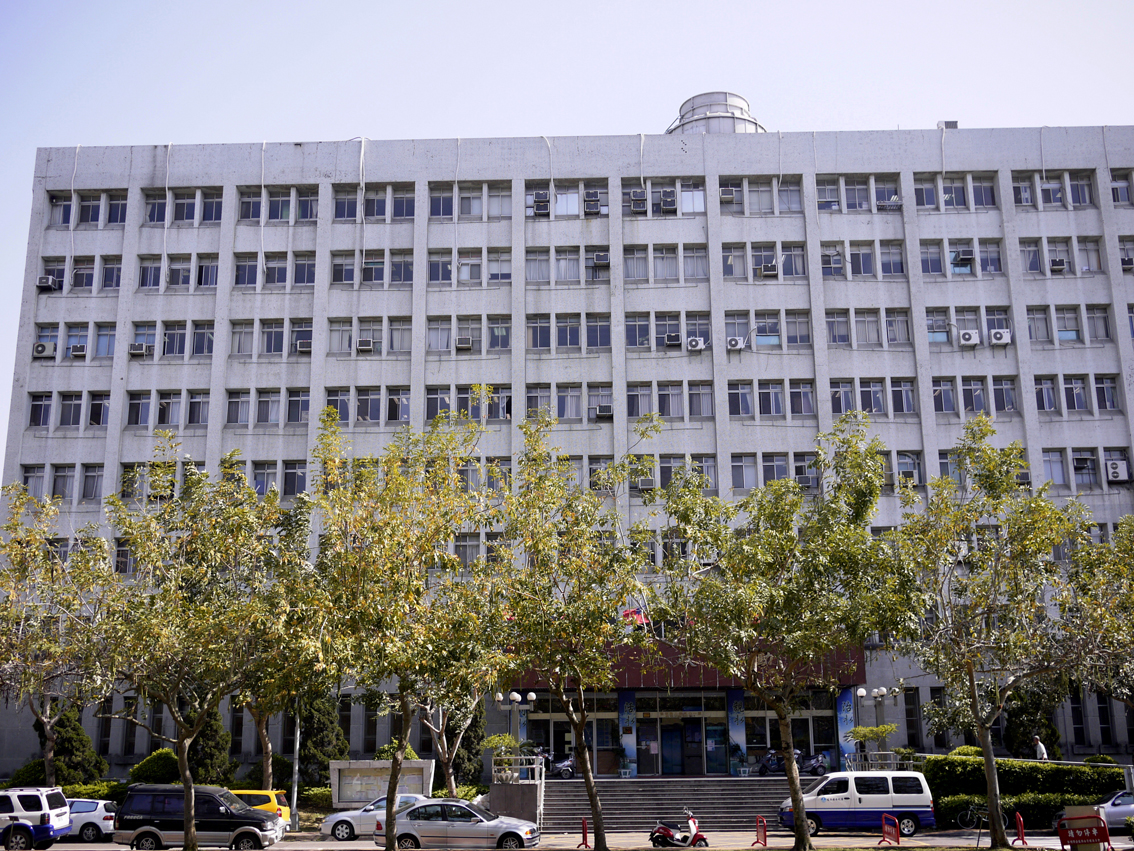

Agency overview
- Formed: 1 July 1999
- Preceding agencies: Taiwan Provincial Government Land Administration Department; Taiwan Province Land Administration Bureau, Land Consolidation Engineering Headquarter; Taiwan Province, Land Administration Bureau, Farmland Rezoning and Planning Headquarter
- Jurisdiction: Taiwan (Republic of China)
- Headquarters: Nantun, Taichung; 24.155229°N 120.634007°E
- Agency executive: Lee Chuen-ming, Director
- Parent agency: Ministry of the Interior
- Website: Official website

The Land Consolidation Engineering Bureau (LCEB; traditional Chinese: 內政部土地重劃工程處; simplified Chinese: 内政部土地重划工程处; pinyin: Nèizhèngbù Tǔdìchònghuà Gōngchéng Chù; Pe̍h-ōe-jī: Lāi-chèng-pō͘ Thó͘-tē Tiông-ōe Kang-têng Chhù) is the agency of the Ministry of the Interior of Taiwan (Republic of China) responsible for land rezoning.

== History ==
The bureau was originally established as a temporary government institution called the Taiwan Province, Land Administration Bureau, Farmland Rezoning and Planning Headquarter. On 1 January 1975, it was renamed to Taiwan Province Land Administration Bureau, Land Consolidation Engineering Headquarter by the instruction of Taiwan Provincial Government and became a permanent institution administering land consolidation affairs in Taiwan under the provincial government as level 4 provincial institute. On 1 July 1979. it was renamed to Taiwan Provincial Government Land Administration Department and promoted to level 2 provincial institute. On 1 July 1999, it was renamed to Land Consolidation Engineering Bureau.

== Organizational structure ==
- Urban Land Consolidation Engineering Section
- Farmland Consolidation Engineering Section
- Rural Renewal Construction Section
- Survey Engineering Section
- Secretary Office
- Accounting Office
- Personnel Office
- Ethics Office

== See also ==
- Ministry of the Interior (Taiwan)
