= Architecture and Building Research Institute =

Republic of China government agency

- 建築研究所; Jiànzhú Yánjiūsuǒ (Mandarin); Kien-chuk Ngiên-kiu-só (Hakka)

Agency overview
- Formed: 30 October 1995
- Jurisdiction: Taiwan (Republic of China)
- Headquarters: Xindian, New Taipei; 24.983296°N 121.541525°E
- Agency executive: Wang Rong-jing, Director-General
- Parent agency: Ministry of the Interior
- Website: Official website

The Architecture and Building Research Institute (ABRI; traditional Chinese: 建築研究所; simplified Chinese: 建筑研究所; pinyin: Jiànzhú Yánjiūsuǒ; Pe̍h-ōe-jī: Kiàn-tio̍k Gián-kiù-só͘) a leading national research agency in Taiwan under the supervision of the Ministry of the Interior of the Republic of China (Taiwan).

== Objectives ==
- Development of intelligent dwelling spaces
- Promotion of green building and environmental control technology
- Planning for safe housing and disaster prevention
- Establishment of fire safety regulation
- Development of innovative engineering technology
- Vitalization of the building industrial economy
- Establishment of holistic life care building spaces
- Preservation of historical and cultural buildings
- Establishment of building performance certification labels
- Improvement of experiment and testing capability

== Transportation ==
The agency is accessible within walking distance from Dapinglin Station of Taipei Metro.

== See also ==
- Ministry of the Interior (Taiwan)
