= Taichung City Constituency 4 =

Constituency of the Legislative Yuan of Taiwan

- Single-member constituency for the Legislative Yuan
- District(s): Xitun, Nantun
- Electorate: 329,203 (2024 election)

Current constituency
- Created: 2008 (as Taichung City Constituency 1); 2010 (current name)
- Party: KMT
- Member: Sean Liao

Taichung City Constituency 4 (Chinese: 臺中市第四選舉區) is one of the 73 regional constituencies represented in the Legislative Yuan, the national legislature of Taiwan. It was created in 2008 (as Taichung City Constituency 1) following a series of constitutional reforms, and elects one legislator, through first-past-the-post voting, to the Legislative Yuan. It has been represented by Sean Liao of the Kuomintang since 2024.

== Legislators ==
Election	Legislator	Party
2008 - 2016	Tsai Chin-lung	Kuomintang
2016 - 2024	Chang Liao Wan-chien	Democratic Progress Party
2024	Sean Liao	Kuomintang

== Election results ==

=== 2008 (Note: Named Taichung City Constituency 1, boundaries unchanged) ===
2008 Taiwanese legislative election: Taichung City 1
Candidate	Party	Votes	%
Tsai Chin-lung	Kuomintang	84,664	61.29
Tsai Ming-hsien	Democratic Progressive Party	53,471	38.71
Total		138,135	100.00
Valid votes		138,135	98.37
Invalid/blank votes		2,282	1.63
Total votes		140,417	100.00
Registered voters/turnout		237,813	59.05
Majority		31,193	22.58
Kuomintang win (new seat)			

=== 2012 ===
* denotes the incumbent legislator

2012 Taiwanese legislative election: Taichung 4
Candidate	Party	Votes	%	+/–
Tsai Chin-lung*	Kuomintang	101,702	51.11	▼10.18
Chang Liao Wan-chien	Democratic Progressive Party	92,213	46.34	▲7.63
Tsai Chih-hao	Green Party Taiwan	3,986	2.00	NEW
Yang Shu-ming	People Union Party	1,104	0.55	NEW
Total		199,005	100.00	–
Valid votes		199,005	98.60	
Invalid/blank votes		2,824	1.40	
Total votes		201,829	100.00	
Registered voters/turnout		263,073	76.72	
Majority		9,489	4.77	
Kuomintang hold				

=== 2016 ===
* denotes the incumbent legislator

2016 Taiwanese legislative election: Taichung 4
Candidate	Party	Votes	%	+/–
Chang Liao Wen-chien	Democratic Progressive Party	100,649	52.77	▲6.41
Tsai Chin-lung*	Kuomintang	70,124	36.77	▼14.34
Yeh Chun-hsing	Faith and Hope League	9,782	5.13	NEW
Wu Shu-hui	Minkuotang	5,616	2.94	NEW
Yen Hui-li	Independent	4,154	2.18	NEW
Yu Shou-yuan	Free Taiwan Party	391	0.21	NEW
Total		190,716	100.00	–
Valid votes		190,716	98.25	
Invalid/blank votes		3,406	1.75	
Total votes		194,122	100.00	
Registered voters/turnout		287,435	67.54	
Majority		30,525	16	
Democratic Progressive Party gain from Kuomintang				

=== 2020 ===
* denotes the incumbent legislator

2020 Taiwanese legislative election: Taichung 4
Candidate	Party	Votes	%	+/–
Chang Liao Wen-chien*	Democratic Progressive Party	119,886	50.90	▼1.87
Huang Hsin-hui	Kuomintang	96,460	40.95	▲4.18
Chang Yu-chiang	Taiwan People's Party	13,434	5.70	NEW
Chen Chih-pin	Independent	3,061	1.30	NEW
Lin Chin-lien	Independent	1,061	0.45	NEW
Li Chia-wei	Chinese Unification Promotion Party	712	0.30	NEW
Yang Shu-ming	Congress Party Alliance	482	0.20	NEW
Chi Ching-i	United Action Alliance	446	0.19	NEW
Total		235,542	100.00	–
Valid votes		235,542	98.58	
Invalid/blank votes		3,404	1.42	
Total votes		238,946	100.00	
Registered voters/turnout		310,726	76.90	
Majority		23,426	9.95	
Democratic Progressive Party hold				

=== 2024 ===
* denotes the incumbent legislator

2024 Taiwanese legislative election: Taichung 4
Candidate	Party	Votes	%	+/–
Sean Liao	Kuomintang	119,740	50.02	▲9.07
Chang Liao Wen-chien*	Democratic Progressive Party	113,350	47.35	▼3.55
Chen Chih-pin	Independent	3,824	1.60	▲0.30
Lin Chung-i	MiLinguall Party	1,661	0.69	NEW
Li Hai-shuo	MiLinguall Party	792	0.33	NEW
Total		239,367	100.00	–
Valid votes		239,367	98.00	
Invalid/blank votes		4,877	2.00	
Total votes		244,244	100.00	
Registered voters/turnout		329,203	74.19	
Majority		6,390	2.67	
Kuomintang gain from Democratic Progressive Party				
