= Department of Conscription Administration =

Government agency of the Republic of China

- 役政司; Yìzhèngshǔ (Mandarin); Yi̍t-chṳn Su (Hakka)
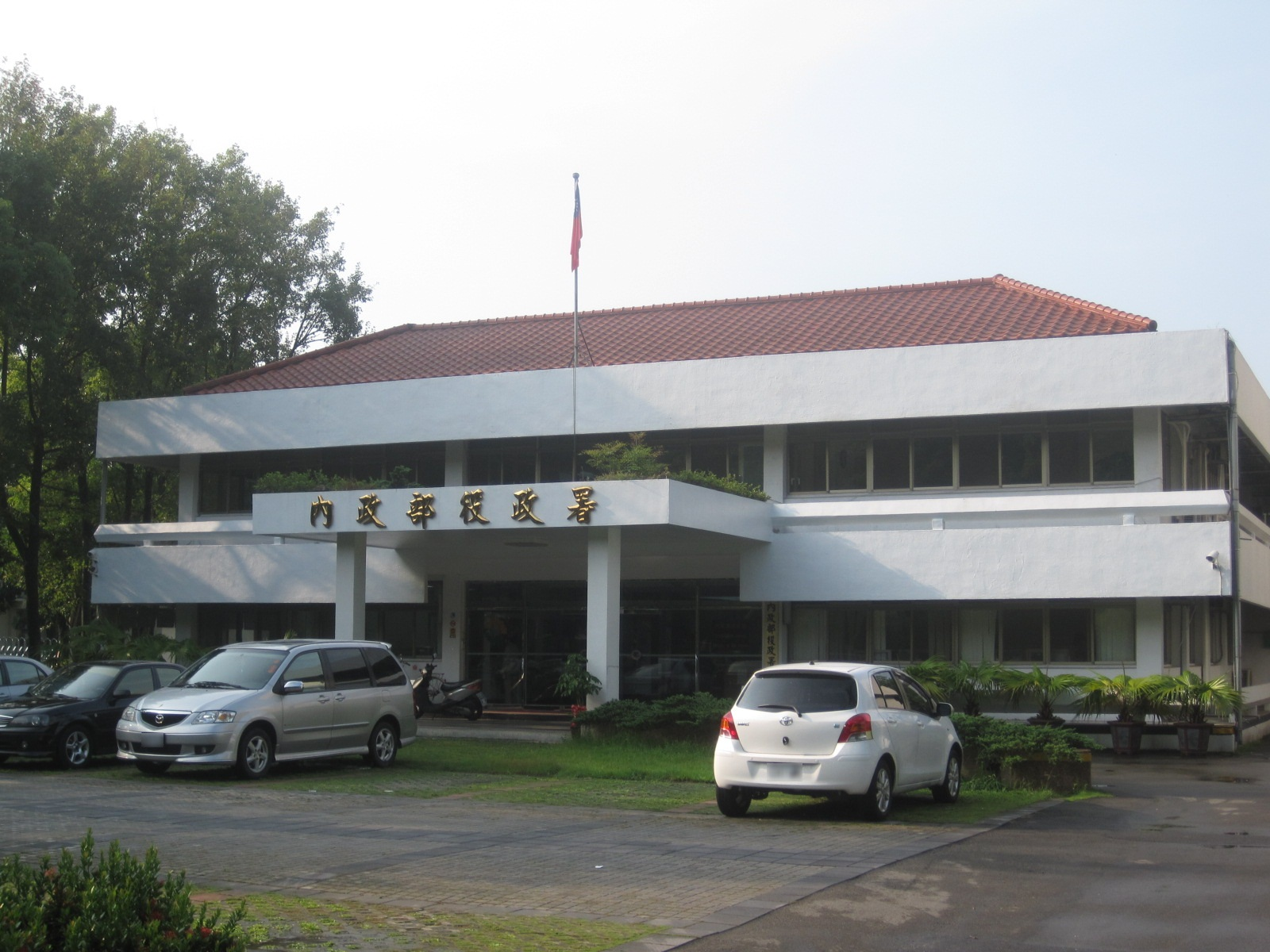

Agency overview
- Formed: March 2002
- Preceding agency: National Conscription Agency
- Headquarters: Zhongxing New Village, Nantou City, Nantou County, Taiwan; 23°56′19″N 120°41′57″E
- Agency executives: Lin Kou-enn, Director-General; Wu Shyun-yann, Deputy Director-General; Liang Kwo-huei, Deputy Director-General
- Parent agency: Ministry of the Interior
- Website: Official website

The Department of Conscription Administration (DCA; Chinese: 內政部役政司) is the agency of the Ministry of the Interior of the Republic of China (Taiwan) in charge of national conscription administration.

== History ==
The agency was established in 2002 as National Conscription Agency. It was later renamed as Department of Conscription Administration.

== Organizational structure ==
- Draft Division
- Selection and Training Division
- Administrative Division
- Interests Division
- Recruit Division
- Secretary Office
- Personnel Office
- Accounting Office
- Anti-Corruption Office

== See also ==
- Conscription in Taiwan
- Ministry of the Interior (Taiwan)
- Military Manpower Administration, in South Korea
