= National Land Surveying and Mapping Center =

National mapping agency from Taiwan

Coordinates: 24.153470°N 120.634462°E

- 內政部國土測繪中心

Agency overview
- Formed: 1947 (as Wasteland Survey Headquarter, Land Administrative Bureau, Department of Civil Affairs, Chief Executive Office, Taiwan Province); 16 November 2007 (as National Land Surveying and Mapping Center)
- Jurisdiction: Republic of China
- Headquarters: Nantun, Taichung, Taiwan
- Agency executives: Liu Jeng-lun, Director; Su Hui-chang, Cheng Tsai-Tang, Deputy Directors
- Parent agency: Ministry of the Interior
- Website: Official website

The National Land Surveying and Mapping Center (NLSC; traditional Chinese: 內政部國土測繪中心; simplified Chinese: 内政部国土测绘中心; pinyin: Nèizhèngbù Guótǔ Cèhuì Zhōngxīn) is the agency of the Ministry of the Interior of the Republic of China (Taiwan) responsible for survey and registration of land.

== History ==
The NLSC was originally established as Wasteland Survey Headquarter, Land Administrative Bureau, Department of Civil Affairs, Chief Executive Office, Taiwan Province in February 1947 of the Taiwan Provincial Government. It was then renamed to Survey Headquarter, Land Administrative Bureau, Department of Civil Affairs, Taiwan Provincial in 1953 and once more to Survey Headquarter, Land Administrative Bureau, Taiwan Provincial in February 1963. It was promoted to Survey Headquarter, Land Administrative Office, Taiwan Provincial in 1979 and reorganized to become Land Survey Bureau, Land Administrative Office, Taiwan Provincial on 3 July 1992.

With the streamlining of Taiwan Province, the bureau became the subordinate of the Ministry of the Interior and was renamed Land Survey Bureau on 1 July 1999 and reorganized into the National Land Surveying and Mapping Center on 16 November 2007.

== Organizational structures ==
- Planning and Technology Section
- Control Survey Section
- Cadastral Survey Section
- Topographic and Hydrographic Survey Section
- Survey Information Section
- Secretariat Office
- Civil Services Ethics Office
- Survey Team

== See also ==
- Ministry of the Interior (Taiwan)
