= National Land Management Agency =

Republic of China government agency

- 內政部國土管理署; Nèizhèng Bù Guótǔ Guǎnlǐ Shǔ (Mandarin); Lāi-tsìng Pōo Kok-thóo Kuán-lí Sú (Hokkien); Nui Ziin Phu Guedˋ Tuˋ Gonˋ LiˊSu (Hakka)

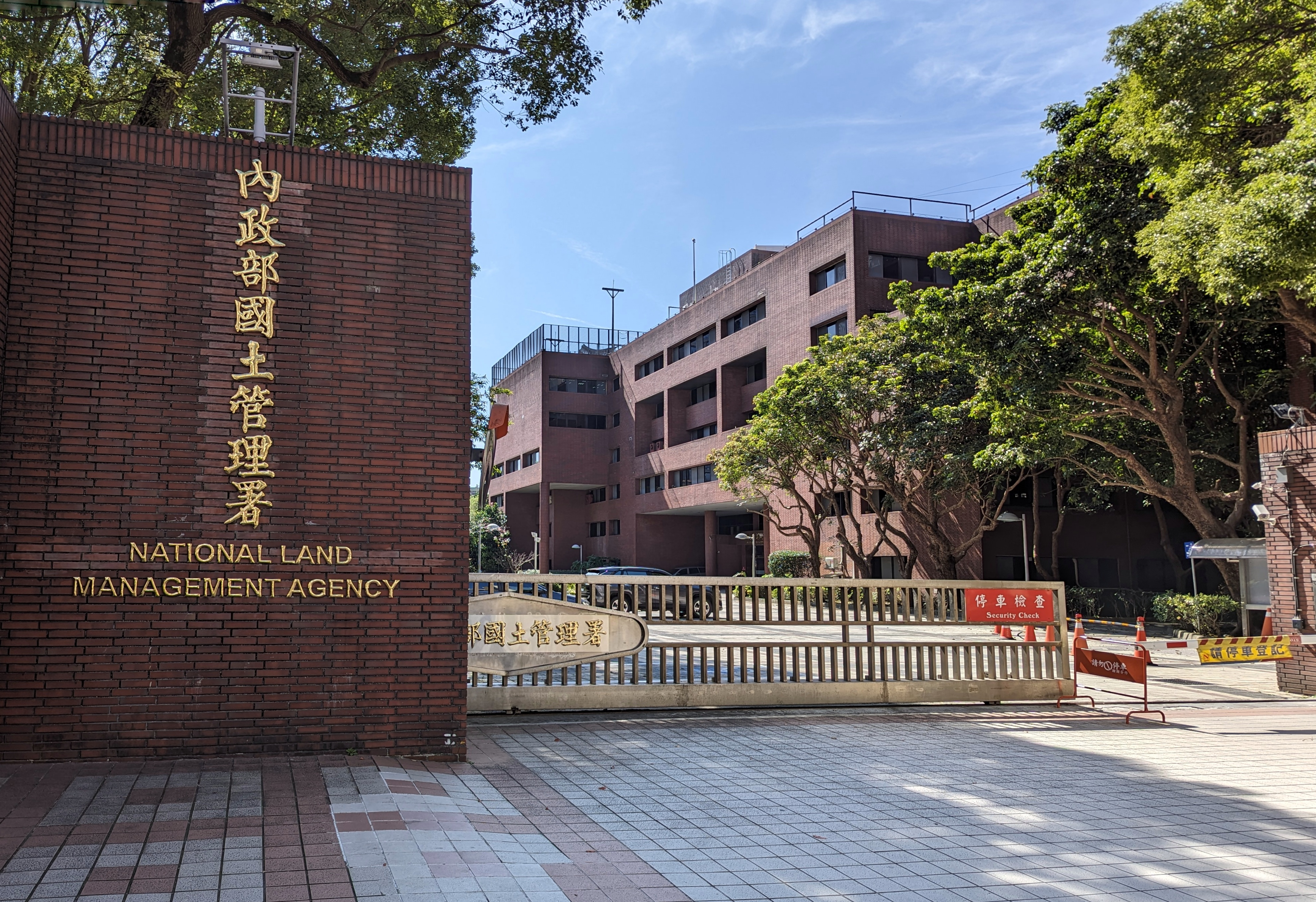
- National Land Management Agency building

Agency overview
- Formed: 2 March 1981
- Jurisdiction: Taiwan (Republic of China)
- Headquarters: Songshan, Taipei
- Agency executive: Director-General
- Parent agency: Ministry of the Interior
- Website: www.cpami.gov.tw

The National Land Management Agency (NLMA; Chinese: 內政部國土管理署) is a government agency responsible for construction and building codes, urban planning, public housing, local infrastructure, land use and management in the Republic of China (Taiwan).

== History ==
It was established on 2 March 1981 as the Construction and Planning Agency of the Ministry of the Interior. On 1 July 1999 in a government reform, the agency was amalgamated with some offices from Taiwan Provincial Government.

== Structure ==
The agency is grouped into the following divisions and offices.

=== Divisions ===
- Planning, Urban Planning
- Public Housing
- National Parks
- Building Administration
- Public Works
- Building Engineering
- Road Engineering
- Environmental Engineering
- Construction
- Planning Administration
- Management Administration
- Land Administration
- Finance Administration

=== Offices ===
- Secretariat
- Accounting
- Civil Service Ethics
- Personnel

== Transportation ==
The NLMA building is accessible South from Nanjing Fuxing Station of the Taipei Metro.

== See also ==
- Ministry of the Interior (Taiwan)
