= National Fire Agency =

Republic of China fire and rescue service

- 消防署; Xīaofángshǔ (Mandarin); Sêu-fòng-su (Hakka)

Agency overview
- Formed: 1 March 1995
- Jurisdiction: Taiwan (Republic of China)
- Headquarters: Dapinglin, Xindian, New Taipei
- Employees: Authorized strength 28,978 Establishment strength 16,933 Actual strength 13,313
- Agency executive: Hsiao Huan-chang, Director-General
- Parent agency: Ministry of the Interior
- Child agency: Local Fire Departments in Taiwan
- Website: www.nfa.gov.tw

The National Fire Agency of the Ministry of the Interior (NFA; Chinese: 內政部消防署; pinyin: Nèizhèngbù Xīaofángshǔ; Pe̍h-ōe-jī: Luē-chèng-pō͘ Siau-hông-sú) is a statutory agency under the Ministry of the Interior of the Republic of China (Taiwan) responsible for fire and rescue. The agency provides emergency medical, fire prevention, firefighting and disaster rescue services as well as protecting civilian lives, property and safety. The agency is administered by the Director General which reports to the Minister for Interior. The current Director General is Chi-Tang Yeh.

== History ==
The National Fire Agency was established in March 1995. Prior to that, fire departments in Taiwan were part of the National Police Agency.

== Departmental structure ==
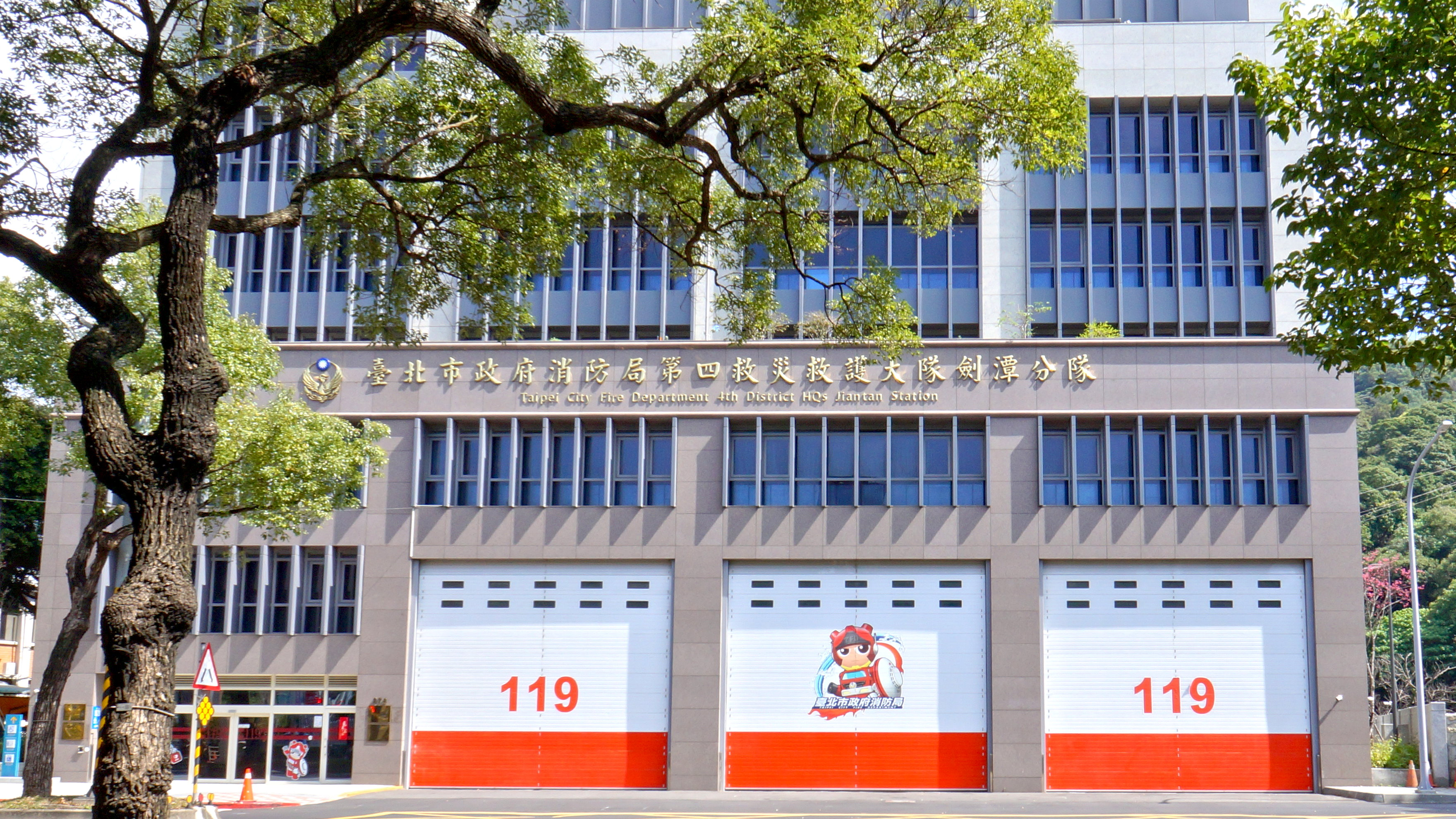
A Fire station in Taipei

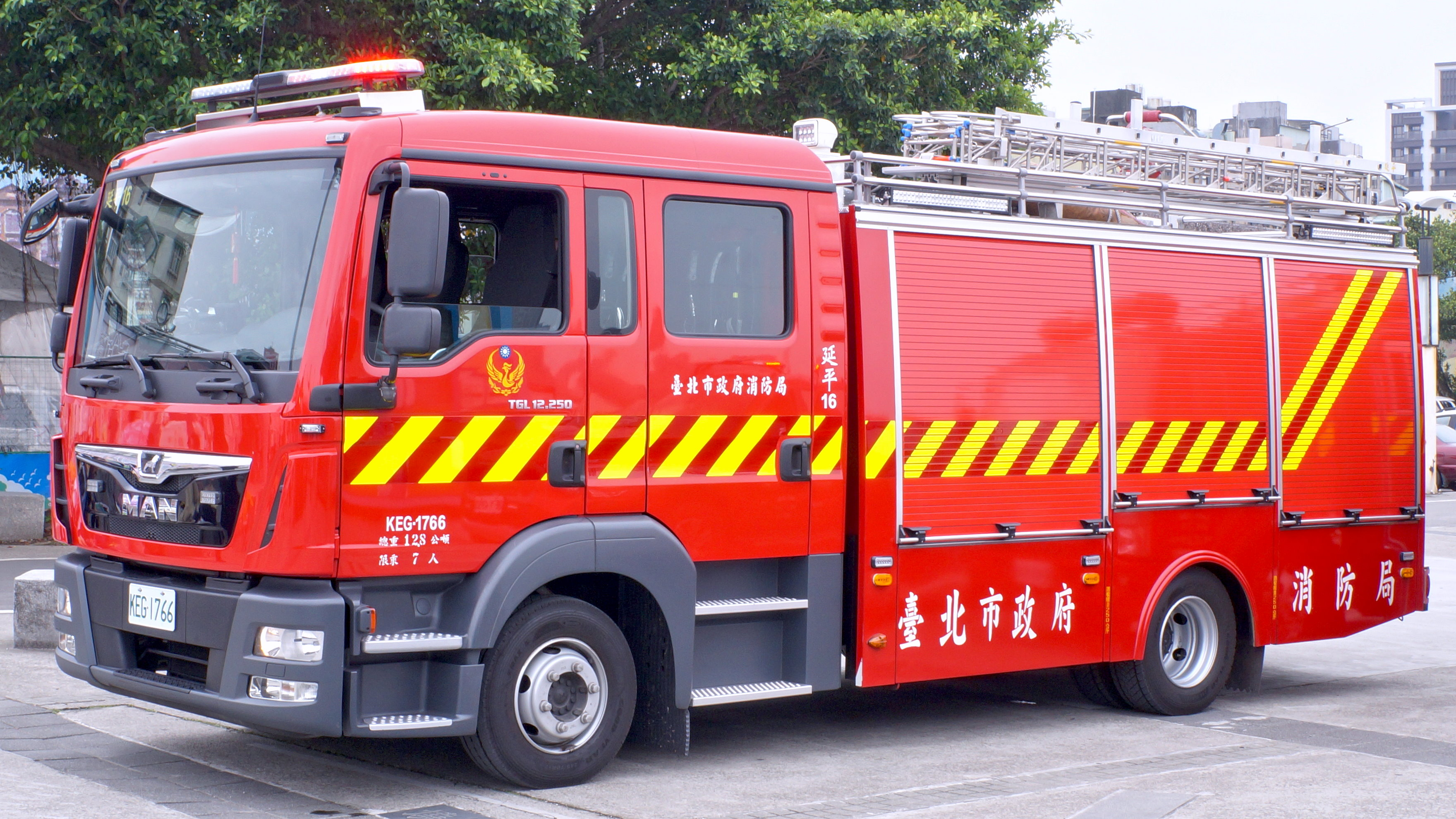
A Fire pumper from TCFD’s Yanping Station

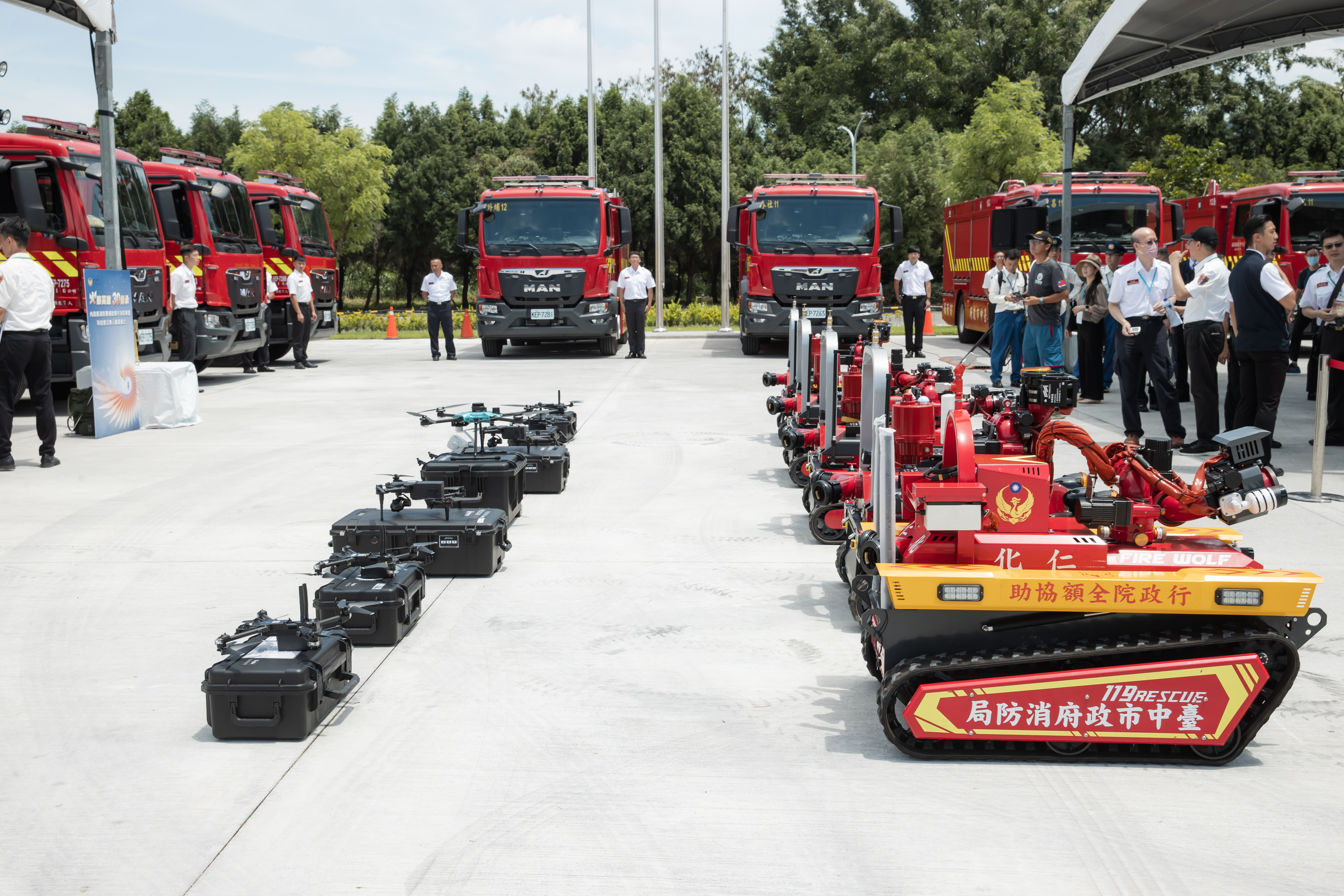
Fire-fighting Robots

The National Fire Agency is composed of the following divisions:

- Planning Division
- Disaster Management Division
- Fire Prevention Division
- Hazardous Aerial Management Division
- Disaster Rescue Division
- Emergency medical Service Division
- Fire Investigation Division
- Training & Education Division
- Civilian Coordination Division
- Rescue Command Center
- Secretariat
- Personnel Office
- Accounting Office
- Civil Service Ethics Office

=== Mission units ===
- Information Office
- Inspector Office

=== External Units ===
- Special Search and Rescue Team
- Training Center

=== Internal Units ===
- Keelung Harbor Fire Brigade
- Taichung Harbor Fire Brigade
- Kaohsiung Harbor Fire Brigade
- Hualien Harbor Fire Brigade

== Local Fire Departments in Taiwan ==
- Kaohsiung City Fire Department
- New Taipei City Fire Department
- Taichung City Fire Department
- Tainan City Fire Department
- Taipei City Fire Department
- Chiayi City Fire Department
- Hsinchu City Fire Department
- Keelung City Fire Department
- Changhua County Fire Department
- Chiayi County Fire Department
- Hsinchu County Fire Department
- Hualien County Fire Department
- Kinmen County Fire Department
- Lienchiang County Fire Department
- Miaoli County Fire Department
- Nantou County Fire Department
- Penghu County Fire Department
- Pingtung County Fire Department
- Taitung County Fire Department
- Taoyuan County Fire Department
- Yilan County Fire Department
- Yunlin County Fire Department

== Transportation ==
The agency headquarters is accessible within walking distance from Dapinglin Station of the Taipei Metro.

== Rank insignia ==
Level	1	2	3	4	5	6	7	8	9	10	11
	Director general	Deputy director general * Fire chief of metropolitan city	Level 3 positions	Level 4 positions	Level 5 positions	Level 6 positions	Level 7 positions	Level 8 positions	Team leader	Team member	Basic level

== See also ==
- Ministry of the Interior (Taiwan)
- Fire department
- List of fire departments
