= Ministry of the Interior (Taiwan) =

Government ministry of the Republic of China

- 內政部; Nèizhèng Bù (Mandarin); Nui-chṳn Phu (Hakka)
- Logo of the Ministry of the Interior

- Seal of the Ministry of the Interior (內政部印)

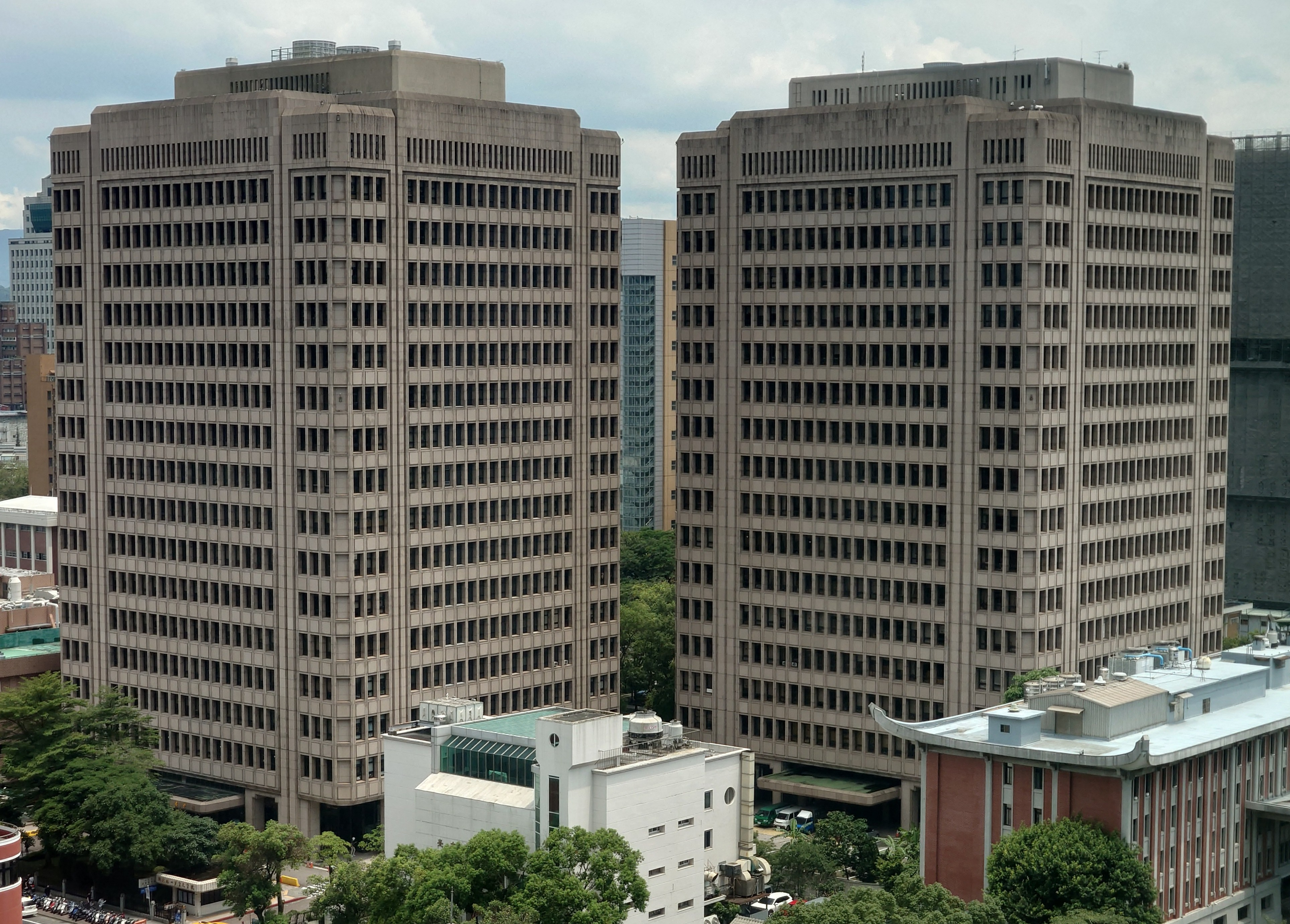
- Headquarters in Zhongzheng

Agency overview
- Jurisdiction: Taiwan
- Headquarters: Zhongzheng, Taipei
- Minister responsible: Liu Shyh-fang, Minister
- Deputy Ministers responsible: Ma Shih-yuan (Deputy Minister); Tung Chien-hung (Deputy Minister); Wu Tang-an (Vice Minister)
- Agency executive: Huang Jun-yi, Secretary-General
- Child agencies: Architecture and Building Research Institute; Central Police University; Construction and Planning Agency; Land Consolidation Engineering Bureau; National Airborne Service Corps; National Conscription Agency; National Fire Agency; National Immigration Agency; National Land Surveying and Mapping Center; National Police Agency; National Park Service
- Website: www.moi.gov.tw

The Ministry of the Interior (MOI; Chinese: 內政部; pinyin: Nèizhèngbù; Pe̍h-ōe-jī: Luē-chèng-pō͘) is a cabinet level ministry under the Executive Yuan of the Republic of China (Taiwan). It is the ministry responsible for home affairs and security throughout Taiwan, including population, land, construction, military service administration, national emergency services, local administration systems, law enforcement.

== Core functions ==
It closely monitors the rights of the residents and every aspect of national development to ensure steady progress of the nation, strengthen social peace and order, and upgrade the quality of citizens' lives.

The Ministry strives to achieve the following:

1. Accomplish government reform to boost government vitality;
2. Care for the minorities;
3. Promote a fair military service system;
4. Implement pragmatic growth management to promote sustainable development;
5. Reinforce police administration reform;
6. Strengthen crisis management to build a comprehensive disaster prevention system;
7. Manage the goals to rebuild the Nation into a beautiful hometown;
8. Implement walk-around management and close planning/control

== Duties ==
In accordance to the Ministry of Interior Organization Act, the Ministry is charged with the following:

- National internal affairs administration.
- The Ministry bears the responsibilities to direct and monitor the highest-ranking local officials in the execution of tasks charged by the Ministry.
- For direct administration affairs, the Ministry is charged with the authority to order or take disciplinary actions against the highest-ranking local officials. When an official is suspected of conducting illegal acts or overstepping his/her authority, this local official may be suspended or removed pending a resolution from an Executive Yuan meeting.

== Organization ==
The Ministry is organized into departments, one office, four sections, six committees, and one center to share the responsibilities.

=== Departments ===
- Department of Civil Affairs: in charge of local administration, local self-governing, border administration, public properties, political organizations, elections, religions, rites, funeral, rituals, and ceremonies, historical site investigation, maintenance, and registration, and other civil affairs.
- Department of Conscription Administration
- Department of Cooperative and Civil Associations
- Department of Household Registration Affairs: in charge of household registration administration, nationality administration, population policies, census, national identification cards, name-usage and registration, migration planning, and other population affairs.
- Department of Land Administration: in charge of land surveys and registrations, land value assessments, equalization of land rights, land entitlement investigations, land consolidation, land expropriation, land utilization, territorial administration, and other land administration affairs.
- Department of Religious and Ceremonial Affairs

Furthermore, the Ministry is also set up with sixteen social administration units and two land administration units, which are directly under the management of the Ministry as second level agencies.

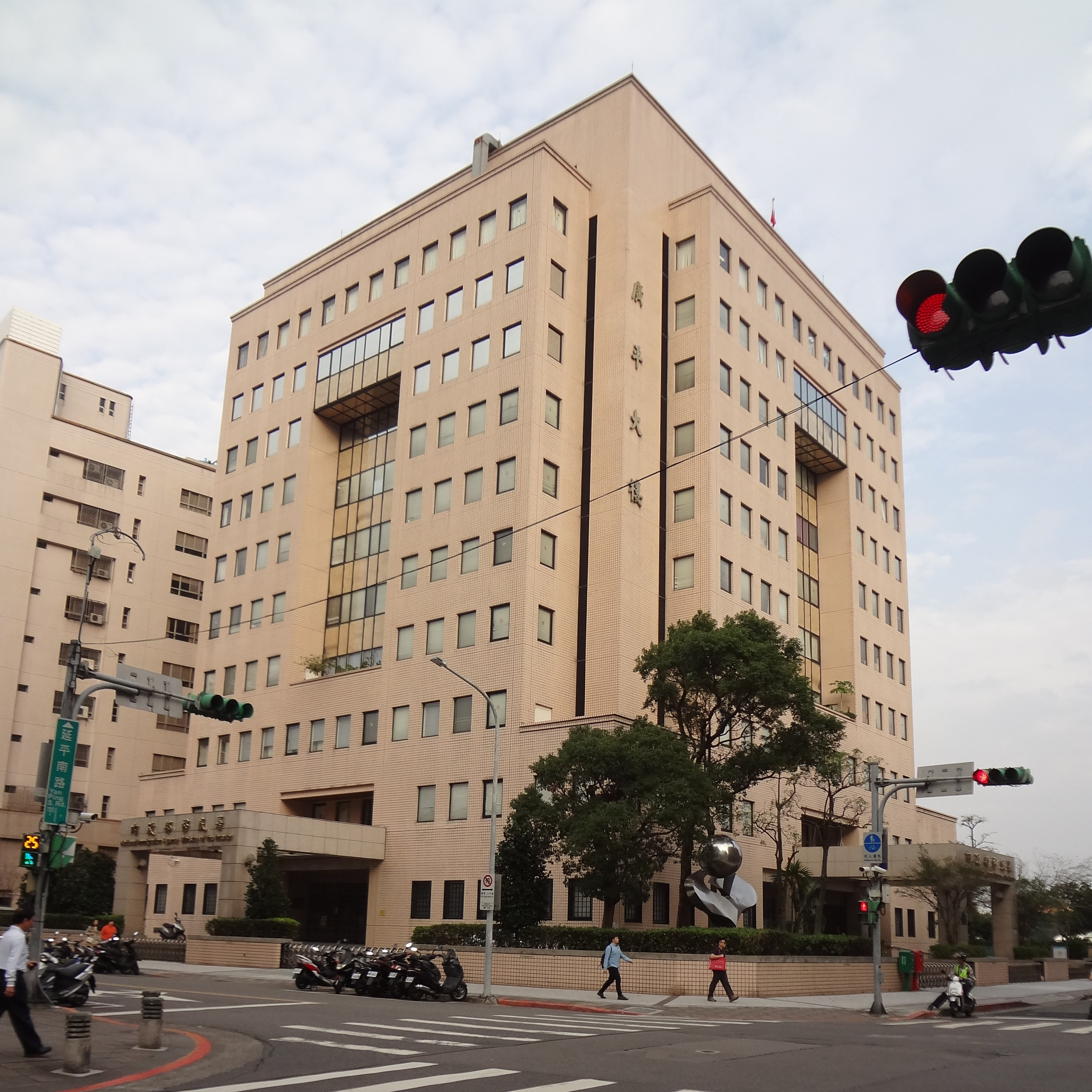
National Immigration Agency

=== Administrative agencies under the Ministry of Interior ===
- Architecture and Building Research Institute
- Central Police University
- Land Consolidation Engineering Bureau
- National Airborne Service Corps
- National Fire Agency
- National Immigration Agency
- National Land Management Agency
- National Land Surveying and Mapping Center
- National Park Service
- National Police Agency

== Ministers ==
Non-partisan/ unknown Kuomintang (Nationalist) Democratic Progressive Party People First Party

№	Name	Term of Office		Days	Political Party	Cabinet
1	Chang Li-sheng (張厲生)	11 June 1948	26 June 1948	15	Kuomintang	Weng Wenhao
2	Peng Chao-hsien (彭昭賢)	26 June 1948	27 December 1948	184	Independent	Weng Wenhao; Sun Fo
3	Hung Lan-yu (洪蘭友)	27 December 1948	1 April 1949	95	Kuomintang	Sun Fo; He Yingqin
4	Li Hanhun (李漢魂)	1 April 1949	6 February 1950	311	Kuomintang	He Yingqin; Yan Xishan
5	Ku Cheng-kang (谷正綱)	6 February 1950	16 March 1950	38	Kuomintang	Yan Xishan; Chen Cheng I
6	Yu Ching-tang (余井塘)	16 March 1950	25 April 1952	771	Kuomintang	Chen Cheng I
7	Huang Chi-lu (黃季陸)	25 April 1952	1 June 1954	767	Kuomintang	Chen Cheng I
8	Wang Teh-pu (王德溥)	1 June 1954	27 March 1958	1395	Kuomintang	Yu Hung-chun
9	Tien Chung-chin (田炯錦)	27 March 1958	1 June 1960	797	Kuomintang	Yu Hung-chun; Chen Cheng II
10	Lien Chen-tung (連震東)	1 June 1960	3 June 1966	2193	Kuomintang	Chen Cheng II; Yen Chia-kan
11	Hsu Ching-chung (徐慶鐘)	3 June 1966	1 June 1972	2190	Kuomintang	Yen Chia-kan
12	Lin Chin-sheng (林金生)	1 June 1972	11 June 1976	1471	Kuomintang	Chiang Ching-kuo
13	Chang Feng-hsu (張豐緒)	11 June 1976	1 June 1978	720	Kuomintang	Chiang Ching-kuo
14	Chiu Chuang-huan (邱創煥)	1 June 1978	1 December 1981	1279	Kuomintang	Sun Yun-suan
15	Lin Yang-kang (林洋港)	1 December 1981	1 June 1984	913	Kuomintang	Sun Yun-suan
16	Wu Po-hsiung (吳伯雄)	1 June 1984	22 July 1988	1512	Kuomintang	Yu Kuo-hua
17	Hsu Shui-teh (許水德)	22 July 1988	1 June 1991	1044	Kuomintang	Yu Kuo-hua; Lee Huan; Hau Pei-tsun
18	Wu Po-hsiung (吳伯雄)	1 June 1991	15 December 1994	1293	Kuomintang	Hau Pei-tsun; Lien Chan
19	Huang Kun-huei (黃昆輝)	15 December 1994	10 June 1996	543	Kuomintang	Lien Chan
20	Lin Fong-cheng (林豐正)	10 June 1996	15 May 1997	339	Kuomintang	Lien Chan
21	Yeh Chin-fong (葉金鳳)	15 May 1997	5 February 1998	266	Kuomintang	Lien Chan; Vincent Siew
22	Huang Chu-wen (黃主文)	5 February 1998	20 May 2000	835	Kuomintang	Vincent Siew
23	Chang Po-ya (張博雅)	20 May 2000	1 February 2002	622	Independent	Tang Fei; Chang Chun-hsiung
24	Yu Cheng-hsien (余政憲)	1 February 2002	9 April 2004	798	Democratic Progressive Party	Yu Shyi-kun
25	Su Jia-chyuan (蘇嘉全)	9 April 2004	25 January 2006	656	Democratic Progressive Party	Yu Shyi-kun; Frank Hsieh
26	Lee I-yang (李逸洋)	25 January 2006	20 May 2008	846	Democratic Progressive Party	Su Tseng-chang I Chang Chun-hsiung
27	Liao Liou-yi (廖了以)	20 May 2008	10 September 2009	478	Kuomintang	Liu Chao-shiuan
28	Jiang Yi-huah (江宜樺)	10 September 2009	6 February 2012	879	Independent →Kuomintang	Wu Den-yih
29	Lee Hong-yuan (李鴻源)	6 February 2012	3 March 2014	756	People First Party →Kuomintang	Sean Chen; Jiang Yi-huah
30	Chen Wei-zen (陳威仁)	3 March 2014	20 May 2016	809	Kuomintang	Jiang Yi-huah; Mao Chi-kuo; Chang San-cheng
31	Yeh Jiunn-rong (葉俊榮)	20 May 2016	15 July 2018	786	Democratic Progressive Party	Lin Chuan; William Lai
32	Hsu Kuo-yung (徐國勇)	16 July 2018	7 December 2022	1605	Democratic Progressive Party	William Lai; Su Tseng-chang II
—	Hua Ching-chun (花敬群)	7 December 2022	31 January 2023	55	Democratic Progressive Party	Su Tseng-chang II
33	Lin Yu-chang (林右昌)	31 January 2023	20 May 2024	475	Democratic Progressive Party	Chen Chien-jen
34	Liu Shyh-fang (劉世芳)	20 May 2024	Incumbent	819	Democratic Progressive Party	Cho Jung-tai

== Access ==
The MOI building is accessible by NTU Hospital Station of the Taipei Metro on the Red Line.

== See also ==
- Republic of China (1912–1949)
- Taiwan
- Cabinet (government)
